= 1561 in music =

List of years in music	(table)
- … 1551; 1552; 1553; 1554; 1555; 1556; 1557; 1558; 1559; 1560; 1561; 1562; 1563; 1564; 1565; 1566; 1567; 1568; 1569; 1570; 1571 …
- Art; Archaeology; Architecture; Literature; Music; Philosophy; Science; +...

== Events ==
- May – Luzzasco Luzzaschi is appointed assistant organist at the Este court in Ferrara.
- 20 December – Virtuoso bass-tenor Alessandro Merlo joins the Cappella Sistina in Rome
- date unknown –
  - Rodrigo de Ceballos succeeds Bernardino de Figueroa as maestro de capilla at the Royal Chapel of Granada.
  - Philibert Jambe de Fer sues the Lyonnais printer Jean d'Ogerelles for failing to give his name on the title page of a volume of his psalm settings.

== Publications ==
- Il terzo libro della muse, a collection of secular music
- Jacques Arcadelt – Quatorsième livre de chansons (Paris: Le Roy & Ballard)
- Jacquet de Berchem – Primo Secundo e Terzo Libro del Cappricio for four voices (Venice: Antonio Gardano), a madrigal cycle setting stanzas of Orlando Furioso, and the first musical work to be titled "Cappricio"
- Ippolito Chamaterò – First book of madrigals for four voices (Venice: Antonio Gardano)
- Ippolito Ciera – First book of madrigals for five voices (Venice: Antonio Gardano)
- Nicolao Dorati – Third book of madrigals for five voices (Venice: Antonio Gardano)
- Jacquet of Mantua
  - First book of messe del fiore for five voices (Venice: Girolamo Scotto), published posthumously
  - Second book of messe del fiore for five voices (Venice: Girolamo Scotto), published posthumously
- Jacobus de Kerle
  - Liber psalmorum ad vesperas (Book of Vespers Psalms) for four voices (Venice: Antonio Gardano)
  - First book of Magnificats for four voices (Venice: Antonio Gardano)
- Gerardus Mes – Souter liedekens (Antwerp: Tielman Susato), a collection of psalms
- Jan Nasco – Lamentations for four voices (Venice: Antonio Gardano)
- Christoph Praetorius – Melodia epithalamii for five voices (Wittenberg), a wedding motet

== Births ==
- January 24 – Camillo Cortellini, Italian composer, singer, and violinist (d. 1630)
- July 17 – Jacopo Corsi, Italian composer and patron of the arts (d. 1602)
- August – Sebastian Aguilera de Heredia, Spanish monk, organist and composer (d. 1627)
- August 20 – Jacopo Peri, Italian singer and composer of early opera (d. 1633)
- date unknown – Juan Blas de Castro, Spanish singer, musician, and composer (d. 1631)
- probable
  - Elias Mertel, German lutenist, composer and intabulator (d. 1626)
  - Peter Philips (c.1560/1561), eminent English composer, organist, and Catholic priest, the most published English composer in his time (d. 1628).
  - Philippe Rogier, Franco-Flemish composer at the Spanish court (d. 1596).

== Deaths ==
- February 15 – Cornelius Canis, Franco-Flemish composer, singer, and choir director (b. c. 1500/1510)
- date unknown – Jan Nasco, Franco-Flemish composer and writer on music (b. c. 1510)
- probable
  - Louis Bourgeois, French composer, famous for his Protestant hymn tunes (b. c. 1510)
  - Ippolito Ciera, Italian composer
  - Luis de Milán, Spanish Renaissance composer, vihuelist and writer on music (b. c. 1500)
  - Hendrik Niehoff, Dutch pipe organ builder (b. 1495)
