= 1554 in music =

List of years in music	(table)
- … 1544; 1545; 1546; 1547; 1548; 1549; 1550; 1551; 1552; 1553; 1554; 1555; 1556; 1557; 1558; 1559; 1560; 1561; 1562; 1563; 1564 …
- Art; Archaeology; Architecture; Literature; Music; Philosophy; Science; +...

This is a list of notable events in music that took place in 1554.

== Events ==
- Johann Walter is appointed court composer for Moritz, Duke of Saxony, in Dresden.
- Vigevano Cathedral's first organ is built by Gian Giacomo Antegnati.

== Publications ==
- Pierre Certon – First book of psalms in lute tablature (Paris: Michel Fezendat), arranged by Guillaume Morlaye
- Ippolito Ciera – Madrigali del laberinto (Madrigals of the Labyrinth), first book of madrigals for four voices (Venice: Girolamo Scotto)
- Pierre Clereau
  - 4 Masses for four voices (Paris: Nicolas Du Chemin)
  - Missa pro mortuis, cum duobus motetis (Requiem mass with two motets) (Paris: Nicolas Du Chemin)
- Costanzo Festa – Magnificat, tutti gli otto toni for four voices (Venice: Girolamo Scotto), published posthumously
- Giulio Fiesco – First book of madrigals for four voices (Venice: Antonio Gardano)
- Miguel de Fuenllana – Orphenica lyra (Sevilla: Martin de Montesdoca), arrangements for vihuela of works by various composers
- Hoste da Reggio
  - First book of madrigals for five voices (Venice: Girolamo Scotto)
  - Second book of madrigals for four voices (Venice: Girolamo Scotto)
  - Third book of madrigals for four voices (Venice: Girolamo Scotto)
  - First book of madrigals for three voices (Milan: Francesco & Simone Moscheni)
- Jacquet of Mantua – First book of masses for five voices (Venice: Girolamo Scotto)
- Jean de Latre – Lamentations for three, four, five, and six voices (Maastricht: Jacob Baethen)
- Philippe de Monte – First book of madrigals for five voices (Rome: Valerio & Luigi Dorico)
- Guillaume Morlaye – First book of psalms by Pierre Certon in lute tablature (Paris: Michel Fezendat)
- Jan Nasco – First book of madrigals for four voices (Venice: Antonio Gardano)
- Giovanni Pierluigi da Palestrina – First book of masses (Rome: Valerio & Luigi Dorico)
- Pierre Phalèse (ed.) – Ninth book of motets, for five and six voices (Leuven: Pierre Phalèse), contains only compositions by Pierre de Manchicourt
- Dominique Phinot – Second book of motets for five voices (Pesaro: Bartolomeo Cesano)
- Francesco Portinaro – Second book of madrigals for five voices (Venice: Antonio Gardano)

== Sacred music ==
- Thomas Tallis – Puer natus est nobis

== Births ==
- May 20 – Paolo Bellasio, composer (d. 1594)
- date unknown – Cosimo Bottegari, Italian lutenist and composer (d. 1620)
- probable – Emmanuel Adriaenssen, Dutch lutenist and composer (d. 1604)

== Deaths ==
- February 6 – Arnold von Bruck, composer (b. c. 1500)
- February 24 – Philip van Wilder, lutenist and composer (b. c. 1500)
- September 25 – Richard Sampson, composer
