= 1569 in music =

List of years in music	(table)
- … 1559; 1560; 1561; 1562; 1563; 1564; 1565; 1566; 1567; 1568; 1569; 1570; 1571; 1572; 1573; 1574; 1575; 1576; 1577; 1578; 1579 …
- Art; Archaeology; Architecture; Literature; Music; Philosophy; Science; +...

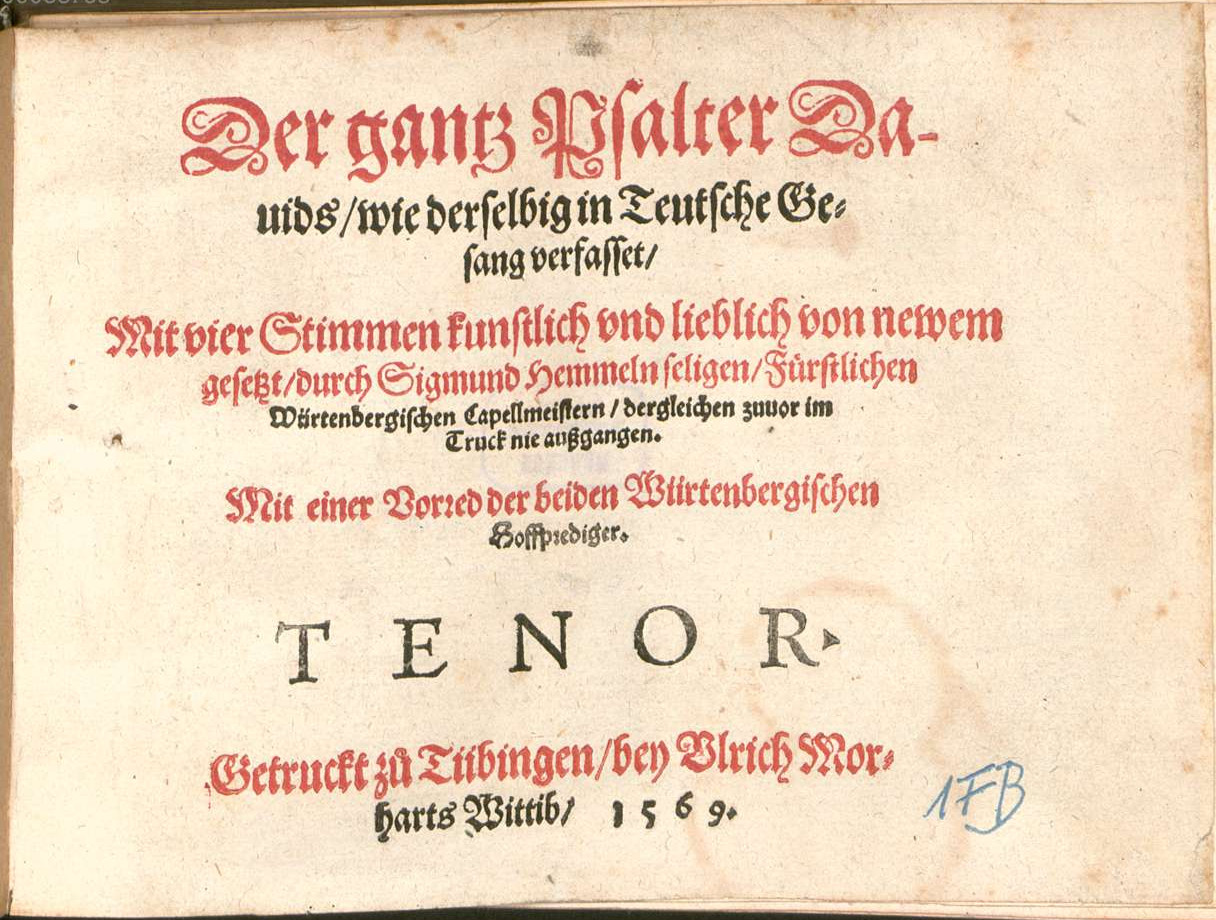
Title page of the psalter by Sigmund Hemmel

== Events ==
- January – Fabrizio Dentice entered the service of Ottavio Farnese, Duke of Parma as a lutenist
- July 22 – Lodovico Bassano is appointed to the London-based Bassano recorder consort, retrospectively effective to 29 September 1568.
- October – Valentin Bakfark, Hungarian lutenist, is arrested on suspicion of involvement in a Hungarian rebellion against his employer, Emperor Maximilian II, but he is quickly released.
- date unknown – A portrait of Josquin des Prez, possibly painted in his lifetime, is installed as a side panel of a triptych in the church of Ste Gudule, Brussels. It was destroyed a decade later, along with all the other images in the church, by Protestant iconoclasts.

== Publications ==
=== Secular music ===
- Jacques Arcadelt
  - Sixth book of chansons (Paris: Le Roy & Ballard), published posthumously
  - Ninth book of chansons (Paris: Le Roy & Ballard), published posthumously
- Filippo Azzaiolo – Il terzo libro delle villotte del fiore alla padoana con alcune napolitanae e bergamasche, for four voices (Venice: Antonio Gardano)
- Ippolito Chamaterò
  - Il secondo libro delli madrigali, for four voices (Venice: Girolamo Scotto)
  - Il secondo libro delli madrigali, for five voices (Venice: Girolamo Scotto)
  - Il terzo libro delli madrigali, for five voices (Venice: Girolamo Scotto)
  - Il quarto libro delli madrigali, for five voices (Venice: Girolamo Scotto)
- Giovanni Matteo Faà di Bruno – First book of madrigals for five voices (Venice: Antonio Gardano)
- Giovanni Ferretti – Second book of Canzoni alla napolitana for five voices (Venice: Girolamo Scotto)
- Giulio Fiesco – First book of Musica nova for five voices (Venice: Antonio Gardano), the first book to set the poetry of Giovanni Battista Guarini
- Tiburtio Massaino – First book of madrigals for four voices (Venice: Antonio Gardano)
- Philippe de Monte
  - First book of madrigals for six voices (Venice: Claudio da Correggio)
  - Second book of madrigals for six voices (Venice: Girolamo Scotto)
  - Second book of madrigals for four voices (Venice: Girolamo Scotto)
- Costanzo Porta – Second book of madrigals for five voices (Venice: Antonio Gardano)

=== Sacred music ===
- Paolo Aretino – Magnificat for five voices, book 1 (Venice: Claudio Correggio)
- Joachim a Burck – Symbolum apostolicum, nicenum, et canticum symbolum sanctorum Augustinii et Ambrosii for four voices (Mühlhausen: Georg Hantzsch)
- Ippolito Chamaterò – First book of masses for five and seven voices (Venice: Girolamo Scotto)
- Sigmund Hemmel – Der ganz Psalter Davids for four voices (Tubingen: Ulrich Morharts), a German-language psalter, published posthumously
- Paolo Isnardi
  - Psalmi omnes ad vesperas per totum annum for four voices (Venice: Antonio Gardano)
  - Psalmi omnes qui ad vesperas for five voices (Venice: heirs of Girolamo Scotto)
- Orlande de Lassus – Cantiones aliquot for five voices (Munich: Adam Berg), a collection of motets
- Giovanni Pierluigi da Palestrina – Liber primus motettorum, for five to seven voices, published in Rome

== Births ==
- 16 November – Paul Sartorius, composer and organist (d. 1609)
- probable – Tobias Hume, viol player and composer (d. 1645)

== Deaths ==
- 11 September – Vincenza Armani, Italian opera singer, musician and composer (b. c. 1530).
- 20 September – Agostino Agostini, Italian composer and singer
- date unknown – Hoste da Reggio, composer (b. c. 1520)
