= 1557 in music =

== Events ==
- August 10 – A precursor of the Royal Artillery Mounted Band makes its first recorded appearance at the Battle of St. Quentin with "drumme and phife".
- Hoste da Reggio replaces Simon Boyleau as maestro di cappella at Milan Cathedral.

== Publications ==
- Martin Agricola – Melodiae scholasticae sub horarum intervallis decantandae (Wittenberg: Georg Rhau), music used at the Protestant school in Magdeburg, published posthumously
- Jacques Arcadelt – 3 Masses (Paris: Le Roy & Ballard)
- Filippo Azzaiolo (published anonymously) – Villotte del fiore: il primo libro de villotte alla padoana con alcune napolitane, for four voices (Venice: Antonio Gardano)
- Jacob Clemens non Papa
  - Second book of masses: Missa Virtute magna for four voices (Leuven: Pierre Phalèse), published posthumously
  - Third book of masses: Missa En espoir for four voices (Leuven: Pierre Phalèse), published posthumously
  - Fourth book of masses: Missa Ecce quam bonum for five voices (Leuven: Pierre Phalèse), published posthumously
  - Fifth book of masses: Missa Gaude lux donatione for five voices (Leuven: Pierre Phalèse), published posthumously
  - Sixth book of masses: Missa Caro mea for five voices (Leuven: Pierre Phalèse), published posthumously
  - Souterliedekens IIII for three voices (Antwerp: Tielman Susato), settings of Psalms and other hymns in Dutch, published posthumously
- Pierre Clereau – Missa Virginis Mariae for four voices (Paris: Nicolas Du Chemin)
- Claude Goudimel – Third book of psalms for four and five voices (Paris: Le Roy & Ballard)
- Jacobus de Kerle – Motets for four and five voices (Rome: Valerio Dorico)
- Orlande de Lassus – Second book of madrigals for five voices (Rome: Antoine Barré)
- Jean Maillard
  - Patrem for eight voices (Paris: Le Roy & Ballard), a setting of the Credo
  - Missa Virginis Mariae for five voices (Paris: Le Roy & Ballard)
- Jan Nasco
  - Canzonas and madrigals for six voices (Venice: Antonio Gardano)
  - Second book of madrigals for five voices (Venice: Antonio Gardano)
- Dominique Phinot – Missa Si bona suscepimus for four voices (Paris: Nicolas du Chemin)
- Francesco Portinaro – Third book of madrigals for five and six voices (Venice: Antonio Gardano), also includes dialogs for seven and eight voices
- Cipriano de Rore
  - Second Book of Madrigals in Four Parts
  - Fourth Book of Madrigals in Five Parts

== Births ==
- February 15 – Alfonso Fontanelli, composer, writer and nobleman (d. 1622)
- September 16 – Jacques Mauduit, composer (d. 1627)
- date unknown – Giovanni Croce, composer (d. 1609)
- probable – Thomas Morley, composer, theorist, editor and organist (d. 1602)

== Deaths ==
- April 21 – Girolamo Parabosco, composer, organist and poet (b. 1524)
- probable
  - Thomas Crecquillon, Franco-Flemish composer (b. 1505; possibly plague)
  - Nicholas Ludford, composer of masses (b. c. 1485; possibly influenza)
