= 1558 in music =

== Events ==
- April – Clemens Stephani is appointed Kantor at the Lateinschule in Eger.
- 9 August – Annibale Zoilo joins the Cappella Giulia in Rome
- October – Nicolas de La Grotte marries Marie Cipran de St. Cloud
- Orlande de Lassus marries Regina Wäckinger, the daughter of a Bavarian court official, in Munich.

== Bands formed ==
- Messina Cathedral cappella

== Publications ==
=== Music ===
- Paolo Aretino – Li madrigali for five to eight voices (Venice: Girolamo Scotto)
- Cyprian Bazylik
  - Nabożna piosnka a obiecna modlitwa człowieka krześciańskiego do Syna Bożego for four voices (Kraków: Matthäus Siebeneicher)
  - Pieśń nowa w ktorej jest dziękowanie Panu Bogu wszechmogącemu ze malutkim i prostakom raczył objawić tajemnice Krolestwa swego for four voices (Kraków: Matthäus Siebeneicher)
  - Pieśń o niebezpieczeństwie żywota csłowieczego (Wspominając początek żywota naszego) for four voices (Kraków: Matthäus Siebeneicher)
  - Psalm 79. Deus venerunt gentes in haereditatem tuam for four voices (Kraków: Matthäus Siebeneicher)
  - Psalm 127. Beati omnes qui timent Dominum for four voices (Kraków: Matthäus Siebeneicher)
  - Psalm 129. De profundis clamavi ad te Domine for four voices (Kraków: Matthäus Siebeneicher)
- Simon Boyleau – Second book of madrigals and canzonas for four voices (Milan: Francesco Moscheni & Cesare Pozzo)
- Pierre Cadéac – 3 Masses for four voices (Paris: Le Roy & Ballard)
- Pierre Certon
  - Missa pro defunctis (Requiem mass) for four voices (Paris: Le Roy & Ballard)
  - Missa Le temps qui court for four voices (Paris: Le Roy & Ballard)
  - 3 Masses for four voices (Paris: Le Roy & Ballard)
- Jacob Clemens non Papa – Seventh book of masses: Missa Languir my fault for five voices (Leuven: Pierre Phalèse), published posthumously
- Giovanni Battista Conforti – First book of ricercars for four voices (Rome: Valerio Dorico)
- Claude Goudimel – 3 Masses for four voices (Paris: Le Roy & Ballard)
- Clément Janequin – Proverbes de Salomon for four voices (Paris: Le Roy & Ballard)
- Jacobus de Kerle – Hymni totius anni secundum ritum Sanctae Rom. Eccl. et Magnificat (Hymns for the whole year following the rite of the Holy Roman Church, and a Magnificat) for four and five voices (Rome: Antoine Barré)
- Jean Maillard – Missa super M'amie un jour for four voices (Paris: Le Roy & Ballard)
- Jan Nasco – First book of canzon villanesce alla Napolitana for four voices (Venice: Angelo Gardano)
- Giaches de Wert – Il secondo libro delle muse

=== Theory ===
- Jan Blahoslav – Musica: to gest knjžka zpěwákům, published in Olomouc, the first book on music theory in Czech
- Gioseffo Zarlino – Le istitutioni harmoniche (Harmonic Foundations)

== Births ==
- date unknown – Blasius Ammon, Franciscan friar, singer and composer (d. 1590)
- probable – Giovanni Bassano, Italian composer and cornettist (d. 1617)

== Deaths ==
- July – Georgius Macropedius, dramatist and composer (b. c. 1475; possibly plague)
- November – Hugh Aston, composer (b. c. 1485)
- December – John Sheppard, singer and composer (b. c. 1515; possibly influenza)
- December 29 – Hermann Finck, composer (b. 1527)
- date unknown – Clément Janequin, composer (b. c. 1485)
