= 1552 in music =

This is a list of notable events in music that took place in 1552.

== Events ==
- Injunctions of Robert Holgate, Archbishop of York, silence the organs of York Minster.

== Publications ==
=== Music ===
- Martin Agricola – Hymns, collected by Georg Thym
- Giovanni Animuccia – First book of motets for five voices (Rome: Valerio & Aloisio Dorico)
- Bálint Bakfark – Intabulatura Valentini Bacfarc transilvani coronensis liber primus (Lyon: Jacques Moderne), a collection of lute intabulations of works by various composers
- Pierre Certon – First book of chansons for four voices (Paris: Le Roy & Ballard)
- Adrianus Petit Coclico – Musica reservata for four voices (Nuremberg: Johann vom Berg & Ulrich Neuber), a collection of psalm settings
- Hans Gerle – Ein Newes sehr Künstlichs Lautenbuch (Nuremberg: Hieronymous Formschneider), a collection of pieces by various Italian lutenists in German lute tablature
- Claude Goudimel – Missa Il ne se treuve en amitié for four voices (Paris: Nicolas du Chemin)
- Jean de Latre – Chansons for four voices (Leuven: Pierre Phalèse & Martin Rotaire)
- Claude Le Jeune – 4 chansons
- Guillaume de Morlaye
  - First book of lute tablature (Paris: Michel Fezendat)
  - Fourth book of guitar tablature (Paris: Michel Fezendat)
- Diego Pisador – Libro de música de vihuela (Salamanca: Diego Pisador), a collection of transcriptions for the vihuela of songs by various composers

=== Theory ===
- Adrianus Petit Coclico – Compendium musices (Musical compendium)

== Births ==
- December 21 – Richard Day, music printer (d. before 1607)
- date unknown – Girolamo Belli, Italian composer and music teacher (d. c. 1620)

== Deaths ==
- January 8 – Eustorg de Beaulieu, French poet and composer (b. c. 1495).
- January 10 – Johann Cochlaeus, humanist and music theorist (b. 1479)
- February 26 – Heinrich Faber, German music theorist, composer, and Kantor (b. c. 1500)
