= 1567 in music =

== Events ==
- none listed

== Published music ==
- Lodovico Agostini - Musica di... sopra le rime bizarre di M. Andrea Calmo, & altri autori for four voices (Milan: Cesare Pozzo)
- Giovanni Animuccia – First book of masses (Rome: Valerio Dorico & Luigi Dorico)
- Jacques Arcadelt
  - Third book of chansons (Paris: Le Roy & Ballard)
  - Fourth book of chansons (Paris: Le Roy & Ballard)
  - Fifth book of chansons (Paris: Le Roy & Ballard)
- Joachim a Burck – Decades IIII. Sententiosorum versuum celebrium virorum germaniae (Mühlhausen: Georg Hantzsch)
- Giovanni Battista Conforti – First book of madrigals for five voices (Venice), edited by Claudio Merulo
- Nicolao Dorati – Fourth book of madrigals for five voices (Venice: Antonio Gardano)
- Giovanni Ferretti – Canzone alla napolitana for five voices (Venice: Girolamo Scotto)
- Giulio Fiesco – Second book of madrigals for five voices (Venice)
- Jacquet of Mantua – Orationes complures ad officium Hebdomadae sanctae pertinentes for four and five voices (Venice, 1567), a collection of sacred music for Holy Week, published posthumously
- Orlande de Lassus
  - Magnificat octo tonorum for six, five, and four voices (Nuremberg: Theodor Gerlach)
  - Fourth book of madrigals for five voices (Venice: Antonio Gardano)
  - Neue teütsche Liedlein for five voices (Munich: Adam Berg)
- Claudio Merulo – Ricercari d’Intavolatura d’Organo, Libro primo
- Philippe de Monte – Second book of madrigals for five voices (Venice: Antonio Gardano)
- Giovanni Domenico da Nola – Il primo libro delle villanelle alla napolitana (The First Book of Neapolitan style villanellas) for three and four voices (Venice: Claudio Merulo & Fausto Betanio)
- Annibale Padovano – First book of motets for five and six voices (Venice: Antonio Gardano)
- Giovanni Pierluigi da Palestrina – Second book of masses (Rome: heirs of Valerio & Luigi Dorico)

== Births ==
- February 12 – Thomas Campion, English composer, poet and physician (d. 1620)
- May 15 (baptised) – Claudio Monteverdi, Italian composer (d. 1643)
- December 15 – Christoph Demantius, composer and music theorist (d. 1643)

== Deaths ==
- January 8 – Jacobus Vaet, Franco-Flemish composer (b. c. 1529)
- date unknown – Bartolomeo Trosylho, Portuguese composer (b. 1500)
