= 1565 in music =

== Events ==
- Costanzo Porta is employed in Padua.
- 5 July – Gioseffo Zarlino succeeds Cipriano de Rore as maestro di cappella at St Mark's Basilica, Venice.
- Pietro Taglia is recorded as maestro di cappella at Santa Maria presso San Celso, Milan.
- Girolamo Cavazzoni supervises the building of the organ at the court church of St Barbara in Mantua.

== Publications ==
=== Secular ===
- Giovanni Animuccia – First book of madrigals for three voices (Rome: Valerio Dorico), also includes some motets and spiritual madrigals
- Bálint Bakfark – Harmoniarum musicarum in usum testudinis factarum, book 1 (Kraków: Lazarus Andrea), a collection of lute tablature
- Gioseffo Guami – First book of madrigals for five voices (Venice: Antonio Gardano)
- Cipriano de Rore – Le vive fiamme
- Pietro Taglia – First book of madrigals

=== Sacred ===
- Francesco Cellavenia – First book of motets for five voices (Milan: Francesco Moscheni)
- Paolo Ferrarese – Passiones, Lamentationes, Responsoria, Benedictus, Miserere, multaque alia devotissima cantica ad offitium Hebdomadae Sanctae pertinentia (Venice: Girolamo Scotto)
- Andrea Gabrieli – First book of sacrae cantiones for five voices or instruments (Venice: Antonio Gardano)
- Claude Goudimel – Sixth book of psalms in the form of motets for four voices (Paris: Le Roy & Ballard)
- Orlande de Lassus
  - Modulorum for four, five, six, seven, eight, and ten voices, vol. 2 (Paris: Le Roy & Ballard), a collection of motets
  - Second book of Sacrae cantiones perornatae for five and six voices (Venice: Girolamo Scotto)
  - Sacrae lectiones novem ex propheta Iob for four voices (Venice: Antonio Gardano)
- Jean Maillard – Motets for four, five, six, and seven voices, volumes 1 & 2 (Paris: Le Roy & Ballard)
- Paulus Melissus – Historia de navicula vehente Christum et periclitante in mari for four voices
- Diego Ortiz – Musices liber primus hymnos, Magnificas, Salves, motecta, psalmos, Venice

== Births ==
- August 5 – Paola Massarenghi, Italian composer
- date unknown
  - Antonio il Verso, Italian composer (d. 1641)
  - Erasmo Marotta, Sicilian Jesuit composer (d. 1621)
  - Pedro Ruimonte, Spanish composer and musician (d. 1627)
- probable
  - Gregor Aichinger, German composer (d. 1628)
  - Michael Cavendish, English court composer (d. 1628)
  - Carlo Gesualdo (c.1565/1566), Prince of Venosa, madrigalist, composer of church music (d. 1613)
  - Sir William Leighton, composer and publisher (d. 1622)
  - Duarte Lobo, Portuguese composer (d. 1646)
  - Francis Pilkington, composer, lutenist and singer (d. 1638)

== Deaths ==
- August – Jacques Buus, organist and composer (b. 1500)
- mid-September – Cipriano de Rore, Flemish composer, primarily of Italian madrigals (b. 1515/1516)
- date unknown – David Köler, German composer (b. c. 1532)
