= 1559 in music =

== Events ==
- Cipriano de Rore leaves his post as maestro di cappella in Ferrara when Alfonso II becomes duke.

== Publications ==
- Filippo Azzaiolo – Il secondo libro de villotte del fiore alla padoana con alcune napolitanae e madrigali, for four voices (Venice: Antonio Gardano)
- Jacob Clemens non Papa
  - Eighth book of masses: Missa Pastores quidnam vidistis for five voices (Leuven: Pierre Phalèse), published posthumously
  - Ninth book of masses: Missa A la fontaine du prez for six voices (Leuven: Pierre Phalèse), published posthumously
  - First through sixth books of motets for four voices (Leuven: Pierre Phalèse), published posthumously
- Pierre Clereau
  - First book of chansons tant françoises qu'italiennes for three voices (Paris: Le Roy & Ballard)
  - Tenth book of chansons tant françoises qu'italiennes for four voices (Paris: Le Roy & Ballard)
- Johannes de Cleve
  - First book of motets for four, five, and six voices (Augsburg: Philipp Ulhard)
  - Second book of motets for four, five, and six voices (Augsburg: Philipp Ulhard)
- Thomas Crecquillon – Seventh book of motets for four voices (Leuven: Pierre Phalèse), published posthumously
- Nicolao Dorati – Second book of madrigals for five, six, seven, and eight voices (Venice: Girolamo Scotto)
- Philibert Jambe de Fer – Psalmodie de quarante et un pseaumes royaux (Lyon: Michel Du Bois)
- Clément Janequin – Octante deux pseaumes de David traduits en rithme françoise par Cl. Marot et autres avec plusieurs cantiques (Paris: Le Roy & Ballard), published posthumously
- Mattheus Le Maistre – Catechesis numeris musicis inclusa for three voices (Nuremberg: Johann Berg & Ulrich Neuber)
- Costanzo Porta
  - First book of madrigals for five voices (Venice: Antonio Gardano)
  - First book of motets for four voices (Venice: Antonio Gardano)
- Adrian Willaert – Musica Nova

== Births ==
- date unknown - Adam Gumpelzhaimer, Bavarian composer and music theorist (d. 1625)

== Deaths ==
- October 2 – Jacquet of Mantua, composer (b. 1483)
- date unknown
  - Nicolas Payen, choirmaster and composer (b. c. 1512)
