= 1566 in music =

== Events ==
- none listed

== Publications ==
- Simon Boyleau – Modulationes in Magnificat ad omnes tropos for four, five, and six voices (Milan: Cesare Pozzo)
- Joachim a Burck
  - Harmoniae sacrae for five voices (Nuremberg: Ulrich Neuber & Johann vom Berg, Erben)
  - Song in honor of the wedding of Johann Gunther and Anna Antonia (Mühlhausen: Georg Hantzsch)
- Pierre Clereau – First and second books of odes de Ronsard for three voices (Paris: Le Roy & Ballard), settings of poems by Pierre de Ronsard, later reprinted in one volume
- Andrea Gabrieli – First book of madrigals for five voices (Venice: Antonio Gardano)
- Claude Goudimel
  - Seventh book of psalms in the form of motets for four voices (Paris: Le Roy & Ballard)
  - Eighth book of psalms in the form of motets for four voices (Paris: Le Roy & Ballard)
- Francisco Guerrero – First book of masses for four and five voices (Paris: Nicolas du Chemin)
- Jacquet of Mantua – Himni vesperorum totius anni for four and five voices (Venice: Girolamo Scotto), a collection of Vesper hymns, published posthumously
- Orlande de Lassus
  - Fourth book of motets for six and eight voices (Venice: Antonio Gardano)
  - Nouvelles chansons for four voices (Antwerp: Jean Laet)
- Mattheus Le Maistre – Geistliche und Weltliche Teutsche Geseng (Sacred and Secular German Songs) for four and five voices (Wittenberg: Johann Schwertel)
- Francisco Leontaritis – First book of motets for five voices (Venice: Antonio Gardano)
- Claudio Merulo – First book of madrigals for five voices (Venice: Claudio da Correggio & Fausto Bethanio)
- Melchior Neusidler – Il primo libro intabolatura di liuto (two volumes)
- Giovanni Pierluigi da Palestrina – Il desiderio secondo libro
- Costanzo Porta
  - Musica in introitus missarum quae in diebus dominicis toto anno celebrantur for five voices (Venice: Claudio da Correggio & Fausto Betanio)
  - Musica in introitus missarum quae in solemnitatibus sanctorum omnium toto anno celebrantur for five voices (Venice: Claudio da Correggio & Fausto Betanio)

== Births ==
- March 30 – Carlo Gesualdo, Prince of Venosa, madrigalist, composer of church music (d. 1613)
- date unknown – Lucia Quinciani, Italian composer.

== Deaths ==
- March 26 – Antonio de Cabezón, Spanish composer and organist of the Renaissance (b. 1510)
- October 31 – Richard Edwardes, English choral musician, playwright and poet (b. 1525)
