= 1568 in music =

== Events ==
- Philippe de Monte becomes Kapellmeister for the Habsburg Emperor Maximilian II.
- Second recorded Eisteddfod, at Caerwys in Wales.
- Antonio Scandello becomes Kapellmeister at the court of the Electors of Saxony in Dresden.
- Girolamo Dalla Casa and his two brothers are hired as musicians at St Mark's Basilica, Venice.

== Publications ==
- Giovanni Animuccia – Canticum Beatae Mariae Virginis (Rome: Valerio and Luigi Dorico)
- Joachim a Burck – Die deutsche Passion (Wittenberg: Johann Schwertel)
- Maddalena Casulana – First book of madrigals for four voices (Venice: Girolamo Scotto), the first printed book of music by a woman in history.
- Pierre Certon – Missa Christus resurgens for four voices (Paris: Nicolas Du Chemin)
- Baldassare Donato – Second book of madrigals for four voices (Venice: Antonio Gardano)
- Vincenzo Galilei – Fronimo Dialogo (Venice: Girolamo Scotto), an instructional book for playing, composing and arranging vocal music for lute.
- Paolo Isnardi
  - Masses for five voices (Venice: Angelo Gardano)
  - First book of madrigals for five voices (Venice: Antonio Gardano)
- Orlande de Lassus – Selectissimae cantiones for four, five, six, and more voices (Nuremberg: Theodor Gerlach)
- Claudio Merulo – Messe d'intavolatura d'organo, book four (Venice), a collection of masses arranged for organ
- Francesco Portinaro
  - Le vergine for six voices (Venice: Girolamo Scotto)
  - Second book of motets for six, seven, and eight voices (Venice: Antonio Gardano)
- Cipriano de Rore
  - Gli amorosi concenti, a posthumous collection of madrigals
  - Il quinto libro de madrigali, posthumous second, expanded edition (first edition: 1566)

== Births ==
- February 29 – Juan Bautista Comes, composer (d. 1643)
- September 3 – Adriano Banchieri, Italian composer (d. 1634)
- date unknown – Christian Erbach, organist and composer (d. 1635)

== Deaths ==
- June 5 – Lamoral, Count of Egmont, subject of Goethe's play and Beethoven's overture (b. 1522; executed)
- October 14 – Jacques Arcadelt, Flemish composer (b. 1514/1515)
- November 12 – Georg Forster, composer (b. 1510)
