= 1563 in music =

== Events ==
- Mikołaj Gomółka leaves the Polish royal court for Kraków.
- Orlande de Lassus succeeding Ludwig Daser as maestro di cappella to Albrecht V, Duke of Bavaria.
- Nicola Vicentino becomes maestro di cappella at Vicenza Cathedral.

== Publications ==
- Giovanni Animuccia – First book of laudi (Rome: Valerio Dorico)
- Severin Cornet – Canzoni napolitane for four voices (Antwerp: Jean Laet)
- Gallus Dressler – Praecepta musicae poeticae (MS)
- Giulio Fiesco – Madrigals for four and five voices (Venice: Girolamo Scotto), also includes four dialogues, two for seven voice and two for eight voices
- Vincenzo Galilei – First book of intavolature de lauto (Rome: Valerio Dorico), a collection of lute music, including madrigals and ricercars, by various composers
- Francisco Guerrero – Magnificats in all eight tones (Leuven: Pierre Phalèse)
- Orlande de Lassus – Third book of madrigals for five voices (Rome: Antonio Barré)
- Nicolaus Listenius – Rudimenta Musicae Planae
- Francesco Portinaro – First book of madrigals for four voices (Venice: Girolamo Scotto)

== Classical music ==
- Antonino Barges – Two motets

== Births ==
- date unknown
  - John Dowland, English Renaissance composer, singer and lutenist (d. 1626)
  - Cornelis Verdonck, Flemish composer of madrigals (d. 1625)
- approximate date
  - Giles Farnaby, English composer, perhaps from Truro, Cornwall (d. 1640)
  - Andreas Raselius, German composer (d. 1602)

== Deaths ==
- February 2 – Hans Neusidler, composer (b. c. 1508)
- August 11 – Bartolomé de Escobedo, composer (b. c. 1515)
- date unknown
  - Thomas Appleby, church musician and composer (b. c. 1488)
  - Francesco Cellavenia, composer
  - Francisco de Soto, organist and composer (b. c. 1500)
  - Thomas Preston, organist and composer
