= 1555 in music =

This is a list of notable events in music that took place in 1555.

== Events ==
- January 17 – Italian viol player and composer Peter Lupo joins the musicians' guild in London.
- January – Giovanni Animuccia succeeds Palestrina as maestro di cappella of the Cappella Giulia
- Palestrina succeeds Orlande de Lassus as maestro di cappella of the Basilica of Saint John Lateran in Rome.
- Composer Thomas Whythorne returns to England from travels in Italy and the rest of Europe. The book he writes about his travels is now lost.
- Lorenzo de' Medici orders a violin from Andrea Amati of Cremona.

== Music ==
- Hermann Finck – Two wedding motets:
  - Amore flagrantissimo, for five voices
  - Pectus ut in sponso, for four voices

== Publications ==
- Jacquet de Berchem – First book of madrigals for four voices (Venice: Girolamo Scotto)
- Pierre Cadéac – First book of motets for four, five, and six voices (Paris: Le Roy & Ballard)
- Pierre Certon – 50 Psalms for four voices (Paris: Le Roy & Ballard)
- Jhan Gero – Two books of motets (Venice: Girolamo Scotto)
- Claude Gervaise, ed. – Sixth book of dances for four instruments (Paris: Pierre Attaignant's widow)
- Claude Goudimel – Second book of psalms for four, five, and six voices (Paris)
- Francisco Guerrero – Motets for four and five voices (Seville: Martin de Montesdoca)
- Clément Janequin
  - First book of inventions musicales for five voices (Paris: Nicolas du Chemin)
  - Second book of inventions musicales (Paris: Nicolas du Chemin)
  - Second book of chansons et cantiques spirituels for four voices (Paris: Nicolas du Chemin)
- Orlande de Lassus
  - Fourth book for four voices (Antwerp: Tielman Susato), contains chansons, madrigals, villanelle, and motets, published in Italian and French
  - First book of madrigals for five voices (Venice: Antonio Gardano)
- Jean de Latre – Sixth book of chansons for four voices (Leuven: Pierre Phalèse)
- Jean l'Héritier – Motetti de la Fama for four voices (Venice: Girolamo Scotto)
- Vicente Lusitano – First book of motets for five, six, and eight voices (Rome: Valerio & Luigi Dorico)
- Jean Maillard – First book of motets for four, five, and six voices (Paris: Le Roy & Ballard)
- Giovanni Pierluigi da Palestrina – First book of secular madrigals for four voices
- Martin Peudargent
  - First book of motets for five voices (Dusseldorf: Jacob Bathenius)
  - Second book of motets for five voices (Dusseldorf: Jacob Bathenius for Arnold Birckmann)
- Dominique Phinot – First book of psalms for four voices (Venice: Antonio Gardano)
- Costanzo Porta
  - First book of madrigals for four voices (Venice: Antonio Gardano)
  - First book of motets for five voices (Venice: Antonio Gardano)
- Nicola Vicentino – L'antica musica ridotta alla moderna prattica ("Ancient Music Adapted to Modern Practice"), a treatise aimed at revising the chromatic and enharmonic genera of the ancient Greeks.
- Adrian Willaert – 'I sacri e santi salmi (Venice: Antonio Gardano), the first printed collection by a single composer of complete polyphonic office settings

== Births ==
- February 25 – Alonso Lobo, Spanish composer (d. 1617)
- June 11 – Lodovico Zacconi, composer and music theorist (d. 1627)
- probable – Paolo Quagliati, composer of the Roman school (d. 1628)

== Deaths ==
- date unknown – Mads Hak, Danish composer
- probable – Jacob Clemens non Papa, Flemish composer (b. c. 1510)
