= 1602 in music =

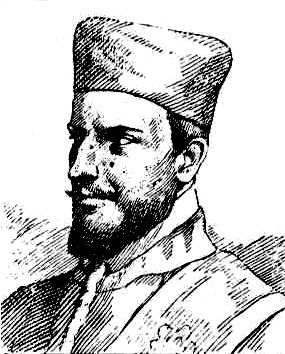
Francesco Cavalli (born Pietro Francesco Caletti-Bruni 14 February 1602 – 14 January 1676) was an Italian composer of the early Baroque period. He took the name "Cavalli" from his patron, Venetian nobleman Federico Cavalli.

== Events ==
- Asprilio Pacelli is appointed maestro di capella of St Peter's Basilica

== Publications ==
- February – Giulio Caccini – Le nuove musiche (The New Music), published in Florence
- Agostino Agazzari – Sacrae cantiones, book 1 (Rome: Aloysio Zannetti)
- Gregor Aichinger – Divinae laudes ex floridis Jacobi Pontani potissimum decerptae (Augsburg: Officina Praetoriana), settings of selections from the Floridorum of Jacobus Pontanus, for three voices
- Felice Anerio
  - Second book of Sacri hymni et cantica (Rome: Aloysio Zannetti)
  - Second book of madrigals for six voices (Rome: Luigi Zannetti)
- Giammateo Asola
  - Psalmi ad vespertinas omnium solemnitatum horas (Vespertine psalms for all solemnities) for three voices (Venice: Ricciardo Amadino), also includes a Magnificat, Salve Regina, and Regina caeli
  - Hymnodia vespertina in maioribus anni solemnitatibus... (Vespertine hymns for the major solemnities of the year) for eight voices (two choirs) (Venice: Ricciardo Amadino)
  - Lamentations for six voices (Venice: Ricciardo Amadino)
- Ippolito Baccusi – Psalmi qui diebus festivus a Sancta Romana Ecclesia in vesperis decantari solent for five voices (Venice: Ricciardo Amadino)
- Giovanni Bassano – First book of madrigals and canzonettas for soprano or bass voice with lute or other plucked instrument (Venice: Giacomo Vincenti)
- Lodovico Bellanda – First book of madrigals for five voices (Venice: Ricciardo Amadino)
- Aurelio Bonelli – First book of ricercars and canzonas for four voices (Venice: Angelo Gardano)
- Christoph Demantius – Trias precum vespertinarum for four, five, and six voices and instruments (Nuremberg: Catharina Dieterich for Konrad Agricola), a collection of music for Vespers
- Scipione Dentice – Fourth book of madrigals for five voices (Naples: Antonio Pace)
- Stefano Felis – Ninth book of madrigals for five voices (Venice: Giacomo Vincenti)
- Melchior Franck
  - Musicalischer Bergkreyen for four voices (Nuremberg: Konrad Baur), a collection of secular partsongs
  - Farrago for six voices (Nuremberg: Katharina Dieterich), a collection of secular partsongs
  - Contrapuncti composti for four voices (Nurember: Konrad Baur), a collection of psalms and other church songs in German
- Marco da Gagliano – First book of madrigals for five voices (Venice: Angelo Gardano)
- Bartholomäus Gesius – Ein Gesang Vom Lob und Preiß der Edlenfreyen Kunst Musica for six voices (Frankfurt an der Oder: Friedrich Hartmann), a song in praise of Music
- Pierre Guédron – Airs de cours for four and five voices (Paris: Ballard)
- Claude Le Jeune – First book of psalms for three voices (Paris: widow of R. Ballard)
- Alonso Lobo – First book of masses (Madrid: Joannes Flandre)
- Duarte Lobo – Opuscula Natalitiae noctis responsoria for four and eight voices (Antwerp: Plantin), a collection of liturgical music
- Tomaso Pecci – Madrigals for five voices (Venice: Angelo Gardano), also contains two pieces by Mariano Tantucci
- Andreas Pevernage – Masses for five, six, and seven voices (Antwerp: Pierre Phalèse), published posthumously
- Costanzo Porta – Hymnodia sacra for four voices (Venice: Angelo Gardano), a collection of hymns for the whole year
- Hieronymus Praetorius – Magnificats for eight voices (Hamburg: Philip von Ohr)
- Orfeo Vecchi
  - Third book of masses for five voices (Milan: Agostino Tradate)
  - La Donna vestita di sole, coronata di stelle, calcante la luna (Milan: the heirs of Simon Tini & Giovanni Francesco Besozzi), a madrigal cycle
- Lodovico Grossi da Viadana – Cento concerti ecclesiastici (One Hundred Church Concertos), the first major publication to make extensive use of figured bass

== Opera ==
- Giulio Caccini – Euridice (not the same as the 1600 opera of the same name by Jacopo Peri, to which Caccini contributed some of the music)

== Births ==
- February 14 – Francesco Cavalli, Italian composer (died 1676)
- April – William Lawes, English composer (died 1645)
- probable – Chiara Margarita Cozzolani, Italian composer (died 1678)

== Deaths ==
- January 6 – Andreas Raselius, German composer (born c. 1563)
- March 11 – Emilio de' Cavalieri, Italian composer (born c. 1563)
- October – Thomas Morley, English composer, music theorist and publisher (born c. 1557)
- November 29 – Anthony Holborne, English composer (born c. 1545)
