= 1562 in music =

== Events ==
- January 1 – Ippolito Chamaterò is appointed maestro di cappella of the Accademia Filarmonica of Verona.
- January 18 – The Council of Trent begins a new session, in the course of which it considers decrees relating to sacred music.
- Cristofano Malvezzi enters the service of the Medici in Florence.
- Alfonso Ferrabosco the elder arrives in England and is employed at the court of Queen Elizabeth I of England.
- Rinaldo del Mel begins his musical studies at the Cathedral of St. Rombaut.

== Publications ==
- Pietro Aron – Thoscanello de la musica, fourth edition
- Claude Goudimel – Fifth book of psalms for four and five voices (Paris: Le Roy & Ballard)
- Jacobus de Kerle
  - Preces Speciales Pro Salubri Generalis Concilii Successu (Special Prayers for the Health and Success of the General Council) for four voices (Venice: Antonio Gardano), setting of texts by Pedro de Soto for the Council of Trent
  - First book of six masses for four and five voices (Venice: Antonio Gardano)
- Orlande de Lassus – Sacrae cantiones for five voices (Nuremberg: Johann vom Berg & Ulrich Neuber)
- Philippe de Monte – First book of madrigal for four voices (Venice: Angelo Gardano)

== Births ==
- January 20 – Ottavio Rinuccini, Italian librettist (d. 1621)
- April/May – Jan Pieterszoon Sweelinck, Dutch organist and composer (d. 1621)
- John Milton, English amateur composer (d. 1647)
- probable – John Bull, English composer and organ builder (d. 1628)

== Deaths ==
- February 15 – Cornelius Canis, Flemish composer (b. c. 1500–1510)
- October 13 – Claudin de Sermisy, French composer (b. c. 1490)
- December 7 – Adrian Willaert, Flemish composer (b. c. 1490)
- probable – Perissone Cambio, Franco-Flemish composer and singer (b. c. 1520)
