= 1556 in music =

== Events ==
- June – At a Corpus Christi procession in Pátzcuaro, Morelia, Mexico, the earliest extant zarabanda was sung.
- Orlande de Lassus joins the court of Albrecht V, Duke of Bavaria.

== Publications ==
- Julien Belin – Premier livre contenant Plusieurs motets, chansons, et Fantasies (Paris: Nicolas du Chemin), a collection of intabulations for the lute
- Pierre Cadéac – Mass for four voices (Paris: Nicolas du Chemin)
- Jacob Clemens non Papa
  - First book of masses: Missa Misericorde for four voices (Leuven: Pierre Phalèse), possibly published posthumously
  - Fifth book of motets for five voices (Paris: Simon du Bosc), possibly published posthumously
  - Souterliedekens I, II, & III for three voices (Antwerp: Tielman Susato), settings of Psalms in Dutch, possibly published posthumously
- Jhan Gero – Second book of madrigals for three voices (Venice: Antonio Gardano)
- Claude Gervaise, ed. – Third book of dances for four instruments (Paris: widow of Pierre Attaingnant)
- Philibert Jambe de Fer – Epitome musical, des tons, sons, et accordz...Violes & violons
- Clément Janequin – Premier livre contenant plusieurs chansons spirituelles (Paris: Le Roy & Ballard)
- Orlande de Lassus – First book of motets for five and six voices (Antwerp: Johann Laet)
- Pierre de Manchicourt – Missa Quo abiit dilectus tuus for four voices (Paris: Nicolas du Chemin)
- Annibale Padovano – First book of ricercars for four voices (Venice: Antonio Gardano), a collection of vocal partsongs

== Births ==
- February 21 – Sethus Calvisius, German theorist and composer (d. 1615)
- June – Pomponio Nenna, Neapolitan Italian composer (d. 1608)
- August 10 – Philipp Nicolai, German pastor and composer (d. 1608)
- December 17 – Abdul Rahim Khan-I-Khana, composer and a minister of the Mughal emperor Akbar (d. 1627)

== Deaths ==
- March 4 – Leonhard Kleber, German organist (b. 1495)
- May 7 – Hieronymus Andreae (alias Formschneider), German printer of music, amongst other things
- June 10 – Martin Agricola, German theorist and composer (b. 1486)
