= 1617 in music =

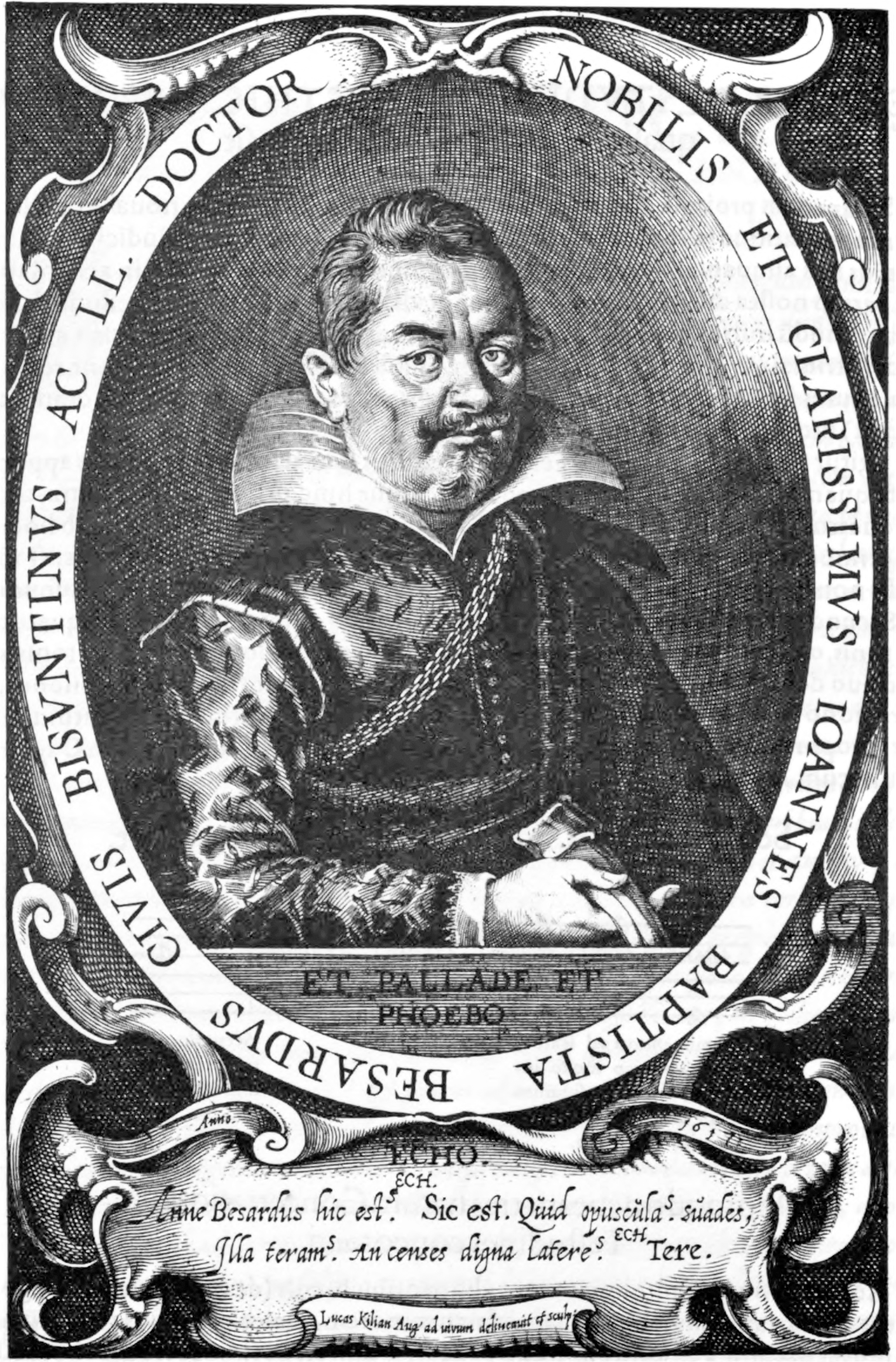
A portrait of Jean Baptiste Besard created during his lifetime in the 17th century

The year 1617 in music involved some significant events.

== Events ==
- January 6 – The Vision of Delight, a masque written by Ben Jonson and designed by Inigo Jones, is performed at Whitehall Palace, probably for the first time on this date, with a second performance of January 19. The work features music by Nicholas Lanier.
- January 16 – Thomas Weelkes, organist at Chichester Cathedral, is dismissed for being drunk and disorderly.
- February 22 – Lovers Made Men, another masque by Jonson, Jones, and Lanier, is performed. (Lanier's music for the masque may have featured recitatives throughout; if so, it would have been a significant precursor of English opera, but this cannot be certain as the music has not survived.)
- August 30 – Alessandro Grandi is appointed singer at San Marco, Venice, at a salary of 80 ducats per annum, under choirmaster Claudio Monteverdi.
- December 29 – John Bull is appointed cathedral organist in Antwerp, with a salary of 80 florins a year plus a special supplement of 20 florins.
- Lutenist and composer Jacques Gaultier flees to England from France after being involved in a murder.

== Publications ==
- Agostino Agresta – First book of madrigals for six voices (Naples: Costantino Vitale)
- Gregor Aichinger
  - Encomium verbo incarnato (Ingolstadt, Gregor Haenlin) for four voices and basso continuo.
  - Officium angeli custodis (Dillingen, Gregor Haenlin) for four voices and basso continuo, dedicated to Maximilian Fugger.
- Giovanni Andreini, Claudio Monteverdi, Salamone Rossi, Muzio Effrem, Alessandro Ghivizzani – Musiche de alcuni eccellentissimi Musici composte per la Maddalena (Venice, Bartolomeo Magni) "Sacra Rappresentazione" (i.e. an oratorio).
- Giovanni Francesco Anerio
  - Fourth book of Sacri concentus (Rome: Giovanni Battista Robletti)
  - Diporti musicali, madrigals for 1, 2, 3, and 4 voices (Rome: Giovanni Battista Robletti)
  - Selva armonica (Rome: Giovanni Battista Robletti), a collection of motets, madrigals, canzonettas, dialogues, and arias
- Bartolomeo Barbarino – Madrigals for three voices and theorbo or harpsichord (Venice: Ricciardo Amadino), also includes some madrigals for solo voice
- Girolamo Belli – Ninth book of madrigals for five voices, Op. 22 (Venice: Bartolomeo Magni for Gardano)
- Jean Baptiste Besard – Novus Partus, sive Concertationes Musicae (Augsburg, D. Franck), collection of lute music.
- Bernardino Borlasca – First book of Ardori spirituali for two, three, and four voices, Op. 7 (Munich: Anna Berg)
- William Brade – Newe Außerlesene liebliche Branden, Intraden, Mascharaden, Balletten, All'manden, Couranten, Volten, Auffzuege und fremde Taentze for five instruments (Hamburg: Michael Hering), a collection of dance music
- Antonio Brunelli – Sacra cantica for one, two, three, and four voices, Op. 13 (Venice: Giacomo Vincenti)
- Thomas Campion – The Third and Fourth Booke of Ayres (London, Thomas Snodham), "so as they may be expressed by one voyce, with a violl, lute, or orpharion".
- Antonio Cifra
  - Fifth book of Li diversi scherzi for one, two, three, and four voices, Op. 23 (Rome: Giovanni Battista Robletti)
  - Fourth book of madrigals for five voices (Rome: Giovanni Battista Robletti)
- Camillo Cortellini – Masses for eight voices (Venice: Giacomo Vincenti)
- Richard Dering – Cantiones sacrae for five voices with basso continuo (Antwerp: Pierre Phalèse)
- Melchior Franck
  - Musicalischer Frewdenschall for twelve voices (Coburg: Justus Coburg), a festival motet
  - Neues Hochzeit Gesang (Drey schöne ding sind), Auss dem 25. Capitel Syrachs for twelve voices in three choirs (Coburg: Justus Hauck), a wedding motet
  - Echus (Quaenam praesentas) for eight voices (Coburg: Justus Hauck), a wedding motet
  - Christliche Musicalische Glückwünschunge zu dem neuen Officio (Coburg: Justus Hauck)
- Marco da Gagliano – Sixth book of madrigals for five voices (Venice: Bartolomeo Magni)
- Pierre Guédron – Third book of airs de cours for four and five voices (Paris: Pierre Ballard)
- Andreas Hakenberger – Harmonia Sacra for six, seven, eight, nine, ten, and twelve voices with organ bass (Frankfurt: Gottfried Tampach)
- Biagio Marini – Affetti musicali (Musical Affections), Op. 1 (Venice)
- Pietro Pace
  - Il secondo libro de scherzi, et arie spirituali..., Op. 14 (Venice: Giacomo Vincenti)
  - Madrigali a quattro et a cinque voci..., Op. 15 (Venice: Giacomo Vincenti)
- Vincenzo Pace - Sacrorum concentuum..., 3 books, Op. 1–3 (Venice: Bartolomeo Magni for Gardano)
- Giovanni Palazzotto e Tagliavia — First book of madrigals to five voices (Naples: Costantino Vitale)
- Francesco Pasquali – Sacrae cantiones..., Op. 2 (Venice: Giacomo Vincenti)
- Enrico Antonio Radesca – Fifth book of canzonettas, madrigals and arias for one and two voices (Venice: Giacomo Vincenti)
- Johann Hermann Schein – Banchetto musicale, newer ... Padouanen, Gagliarden, Courenten und Allemanden à 5, auff allerley Instrumenten (Leipzig).

== Opera ==
- Giordano Giacobbi – Il Reno sacrificante

== Births ==
- April 3 – Antimo Liberati, Italian music theorist, composer, and contralto singer (d. 1692)

== Deaths ==
- February 16 – Kaspar Ulenberg, German theologian, poet, and composer (born 1549)
- April 5 – Alonso Lobo, Spanish composer (born 1555)
- August 8 – Tarquinia Molza, Italian singer (born 1542)
- August 16 – Giovanni Bassano, cornet player and composer (born c. 1560)
- date unknown
  - Cesare Bendinelli, Italian trumpet player (born c. 1542)
  - Robert Jones, lutenist and composer (born c. 1577)
