= 1553 in music =

This is a list of notable events in music that took place in 1553.

== Publications ==
- Francesco Bendusi – Opera nova di balli for four (Venice: Antonio Gardano), a collection of dance music
- Baldassare Donato – First book of madrigals for five and six voices (Venice: Antonio Gardano)
- Jhan Gero – 40 Madrigals for three voices (Venice: Antonio Gardano)
- Jacquet of Mantua – Motets for five voices (Venice: Antonio Gardano)
- Vicente Lusitano – Introduttione facilissima, et novissima, di canto fermo, figurato, contraponto semplice, et in concerto, con regole generali per far fughe differenti sopra il canto fermo, a 2, 3, et 4 voci, et compositioni, proportioni, generi. s. diatonico, cromatico, enarmonico (Rome)
- Guillaume de Morlaye
  - first collection for lute
  - Second book of guitar tablature (Paris: Michel Fezendat)
- Diego Ortiz
  - Trattado de glossas sobre clausulas y otros generos de puntos en la musica de violones nuevamente puestos en luz, 10 December, Rome (Spanish edition)
  - Glose sopra le cadenze et altre sorte de punti in la musica del violone, 10 December, Rome (Italian edition of Trattado de glossas)

== Births ==
- October 18? – Luca Marenzio (c.1553), Italian composer (d. 1599)
- date unknown – Johannes Eccard, German composer and kapellmeister (d. 1611)
- probable – Leonhard Lechner, German composer (d. 1606)

== Deaths ==
- February 4 – Caspar Othmayr, German Protestant pastor, theologian and composer (b. 1515)
- October 7 – Cristóbal de Morales, Spanish composer (b. 1500)
- date unknown
  - Mateo Flecha, Catalan composer (b. 1481)
  - Mattio Rampollini, Italian composer (b. 1497)
