= 1551 in music =

This is a list of notable events in music that took place in 1551.

== Events ==
- Pope Julius III brings his protégé Palestrina to Rome as maestro di cappella of the Cappella Giulia at St. Peter's Basilica.
- Famous confrontation between Nicola Vicentino and Vicente Lusitano about Greek diatonic, chromatic and enharmonic genera.
- Giralamo Parabosco elected first organist at St Mark's, Venice
- The music printing and publishing company Le Roy & Ballard was founded in Paris by cousins Adrian Le Roy and Robert Ballard
  - August 14 – Le Roy & Ballard obtain royal privilege to print music from Henry II
- Francisco Guerrero appointed voce-maestro de capilla at Seville Cathedral
- Cristobal Morales appointed maestro di capilla at Malaga Cathedral
- Loys Bourgeois imprisoned in Geneva for changing psalm tunes without a license. He was released following John Calvin's personal intervention

== Publications ==
- Giovanni Animuccia – Second book of madrigals for five voices (Rome: Antonio Blado)
- Constanzo Festa – First book of madrigals for three voices, published posthumously
- Claude Goudimel – First book of psalms for three, four, and five voices (Paris: Nicolas du Chemin)
- Adrian Le Roy – Book of lute arrangements Premier Livre de Tablature de Luth (Paris: Le Roy and Ballard)
- Tielman Susato – Collection of dance music Het derde musyck boexken alderhande dansyerye was published in Antwerp

== Sacred music ==
- Johann Walter – Gelobet seist du, Jesu Christ

== Births ==
- October 8 – Giulio Caccini, Italian composer (d. 1618)
- probable – Benedetto Pallavicino, Italian organist and composer (d. 1601)
- approx. year – Paolo Virchi, Italian composer, viol player and organist (d. 1610)
- approx. year – Sebastian de Vivanco, Spanish composer, priest and teacher (d. 1622)

== Deaths ==
- date unknown – Albert de Rippe, Italian lutenist and composer (b. c. 1500)
- Johannes Wannenmacher, German composer
- August 12 – Paul Speratus, theologian and hymn writer (b. 1484).
- November – Juan Alvarez de Almorox, died in Segovia
- approx. year – Jean L'Heritier, composer and singer, died probably in northern Italy (b. c. 1480).
