= Georg Thym =

German poet

Georg Thym (c.1520, Zwickau – 21 December 1560, Wittenberg) was a German teacher, poet and writer.

== Life ==
Thym attended school in his home town and then, from 1540, attended the University of Wittenberg, where he met (among others) Martin Luther and Philipp Melanchthon, who remained his lifelong friends. After graduating from his "Grundstudium", in 1544 Thym took up a post as under-teacher in Magdeburg, where he was a colleague of Martin Agricola.

He soon moved to a school in Zerbst and – after acquiring his master's degree in Wittenberg – became rector of the school in his hometown in 1548. He did not remain there for long, however, since in 1551 he was summoned to Goslar and then in 1554 appointed to be a schoolmaster in Wernigerode. In 1555 he returned to Wittenberg, and in October that year was admitted to the philosophy faculty of the Wittenberger Akademie.

Here he held private lectures, pursued his own studies further and established a private school. Thym was above all an author of school books, grammatical writings, and an author of German and Latin poems. Besides a handbook of the Christian teaching in verse form, he related the Henry the Lion saga in verse form.

== Works ==
- Zwölff Heuptartikel des Bekendtnis unseres christlichen Glaubens,
- Thedel von Wallmoden, Magdeburg 1558, Straßburg 1559, Wolfenbüttel 1563
- Exempla syntaxeos

== Bibliography ==
- (in German) Walther Killy: Killy Literaturlexikon. Autoren und Werke deutscher Sprache (15 volumes. Gütersloh, München: Bertelsmann-Lexikon-Verl., 1988-1991 (CD-ROM: Berlin 1998, ISBN 3-932544-13-7)
- (in German) Paul Zimmermann: Georg Thym. In: Allgemeine Deutsche Biographie (ADB). Vol. 38, Leipzig 1894, S. 234 f.
- (in German) Christian Friedrich Kesslin: Nachrichten von Schriftstellern und Künstlern der Grafschaft Wernigerode. Vom Jahre 1074 bis 1855. Wernigerode [u. a.] 1856
