= Bartolomeo Trosylho =

Portuguese composer (1500–1567)

Bartolomeo Trosylho (1500–1567) was a Portuguese composer of the Renaissance. He was a singer in the Royal Chapel of Dom João III of Portugal and became master of the chapel in 1548. mestre de capela (choirmaster) at Lisbon Cathedral beginning in 1551.

One of his surviving works is the motet Circumdederunt me. Although the heading of the ms. containing Circumdederunt me (My enemies have surrounded me) is "pro defunctis trosylho" (for the dead, Trosylho), the text is, in fact, for the Indroit for Septuagesima Sunday.
