= Pedro de Soto =

Spanish Dominican theologian

Pedro de Soto (1493-1563) was a Spanish Dominican theologian.

== Biography ==
De Soto (in Latin Petrus a Soto) was confessor to Holy Roman Emperor Charles V. Later, for six years, he served as senior chair of theology at the University of Dillingen, where he disputed with Protestants and worked with the Bishop of Augsburg to establish a Catholic academic stronghold. In May 1555 he was sent to London to take part in the late stages of the persecutions that led to the executions of the Oxford Martyrs, and was more generally involved in Reginald Pole's efforts to solidify England's return to Catholicism under Mary I. He served as theology professor at the University of Oxford from October 1555 to August 1556, teaching a course on the Sentences of Peter Lombard, with the Regius Professorship of Hebrew being temporarily appropriated to give him a position.

He was first theologian of Pope Pius IV at the third convocation of the Council of Trent (1559), but was accused in 1560 by the Inquisition in Valladolid of being influenced by Lutheranism, largely on the basis of having urged approval of Bartolomé Carranza's Catechism, and comments he made at the Council. During the Council he wrote scripture-based poems that were set to music by the Flemish composer Jacobus de Kerle which reportedly influenced the deliberations of the Council Fathers on sacred music. He died in Trent in 1563 while the trial was still in its early stages.
