= Adrianus Petit Coclico =

Netherlandish composer

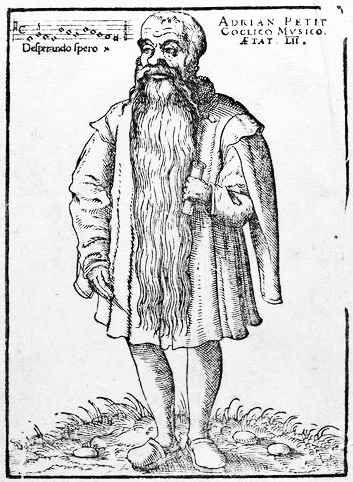
Adrianus Petit Coclico. Anonymous woodcut, 1552.

Adrianus Petit Coclico (1499 in Flanders – after September 1562 in Copenhagen) was a Netherlandish composer of the Renaissance.

== Biography ==
Like many Renaissance composers, very little is known about Coclico's early life. He was raised Catholic but became a Protestant and left Flanders for Germany. The earliest known reference to him in official documents is at Wittenberg University in 1545, and though he later claimed to have been a pupil of Josquin des Prez and to have worked for Henry VIII, the French royal court, and the Pope, scholarship has not been able to substantiate any of these claims.

In 1546, Coclico applied for a position as chair of music at Wittenberg, composing a lost piece on a text by Philipp Melanchthon, and was denied the position. He married around this time, though his wife soon left him, and his attempts to have the union dissolved failed.

He then moved to Frankfurt an der Oder and founded a musicians' society with members of the circle of humanist Jodocus Willich. In poor financial straits, Coclico left Frankfurt for Stettin in 1547, where he was again denied a position; in September of that year he graduated from Königsberg University and entered into the service of the Duke of Prussia. Coclico was involved in religious disputes with Lutherans there and claimed to have been imprisoned on account of his religion. Nevertheless, he retained his post until 1550, at which time he was found to have sired a child with his housekeeper.

Coclico then moved to Nuremberg, where he taught students and had a collection of his motets, Consolationes piae, and a music theory treatise, Compendium musices, published by Johannes Berg in 1552. Nothing is known of his subsequent whereabouts until 1555, when records show he was in Schwerin; he had little luck finding work there and moved on to Wismar, where he held a position as a choirmaster for a short time. He lost this position after demanding too high a salary and moved to Copenhagen, where he became a singer and musician at the courts of Christian III and Marcellus Amersfortius. After the death of his wife, he remarried and disappears from the court record books in September 1562; it is assumed he died soon thereafter.

== Works ==
- Consolationes piae: musica reservata (41 motets, Nuremberg, 1552)
- Disc bone clerices (4vv)
- Nulla quidem virtus (5vv)
- Si consurrexistis (8vv)
- Venite exultemus Domino (5vv)
