= Gerardus Mes =

Franco-Flemish composer

Gerardus Mes or Gherardus (fl. c. 1561) was a Franco-Flemish composer.

== Life and work ==
Little of his work has survived, except the settings for four voices of the Souterliedekens, 150 Dutch Psalm Songs and canticles, possibly written by nobleman Willem van Zuylen van Nijevelt and published in 1540 with a notation of the melody for one voice. Mes's settings appeared in Antwerp in 1561 as the eighth up to the eleventh volume of the Musijck Boexkens, a collection of Dutch songs edited by Tielman Susato. In this series, Susato had already published Jacobus Clemens non-Papa's Psalm settings for three voices in 1556-57.

As was already the case with the Dutch secular songs from Susato's Ierste and Tweetste Musijck Boexken (first and second Music Book), performance with human voices as well as with instruments is suggested in the edition of Mes's Psalm settings. On the title page of the Souterliedekens, Mes is also mentioned as a pupil of Clemens non-Papa, which is the only fact we know about his life. Of his Souterliedekens, no complete copy has survived; the bass voice is missing.

In his Souterliedekens, Mes made use of several writing techniques: sometimes, he used the original tune of a Psalm Song from the collection published in 1540 in the soprano voice (while Clemens used the tunes in the tenor voice); sometimes he wrote an entirely new composition, in which now and then was initially borrowed from the original tune whereupon the composition goes its own way. In a number of cases, Mes used an existing tune, but another one as Clemens did. Mes's Souterliedekens were apparently still popular in the seventeenth century; some of them were used by the Delft priest and poet Stalpart van der Wiele. An attempt to reconstruct the Souterliedekens's missing bass voice, was undertaken by Louis Peter Grijp.

Apart from his Souterliedekens, only one other piece of music by Mes has survived; a motet.

== Sources ==
- Louis Peter Grijp, The Souterliedekens by Gherardus Mes (1561), in From Ciconia to Sweelinck, Donum natalicum Willem Elders, Amsterdam, 1994
- Louis Peter Grijp, in the booklet of the cd Souterliedekens, sixteenth century secular songs and psalm settings from the Netherlands, Camerata Trajectina, directed by Louis Peter Grijp.
