= Albert de Rippe =

Italian lutenist and composer

Albert de Rippe (Alberto da Ripa da Mantova) (c. 1500–1551) was an Italian lutenist and composer. He was born in Mantua and worked there before 1528, when he left for France. There, he joined the court of Francis I in 1529. De Rippe was evidently held in great esteem at the court, as his annual salary was double that of any other lutenist, and he also frequently received gifts of land, money, wine, etc., and various other benefits. Francis I granted Rippe a letter of naturalization, guaranteeing his descendants an inheritance. At Rippe's death, Pierre de Ronsard wrote a eulogy that claimed Rippe's lute continued to create music from his tomb.

His earliest known compositions date from 1536. He only published three works during his lifetime, but six volumes of his music were published posthumously by his pupil, Guillaume de Morlaye. That edition was titled, and is now sometimes referred to as, tab[u]lature de leut.

De Rippe's oeuvre consists of 26 fantasias, 59 intabulations (46 chansons, 10 motets and 3 madrigals) and 10 dances, all for six-course lute, and 2 fantasias for four-course Renaissance guitar. The lute fantasias are now considered his most important works: they represent a novel type for the time, of purely instrumental composition. Their dense polyphony and complex architecture (some evolve for several hundred bars), as well as the skill required to play them, make the fantasias some of the most important works in the repertoire.

== References and further reading ==
- R.W. Bruggart. Alberto da Ripa: Lutenist and Composer (diss., U. of Michigan, 1956)
- Coelho, Victor Anand (2001). "Alberto da Ripa (da Mantova)". In Sadie, Stanley; Tyrrell, John (eds.). The New Grove Dictionary of Music and Musicians (2nd ed.). London: Macmillan. ISBN 978-1-56159-239-5.
