= 1613 in music =

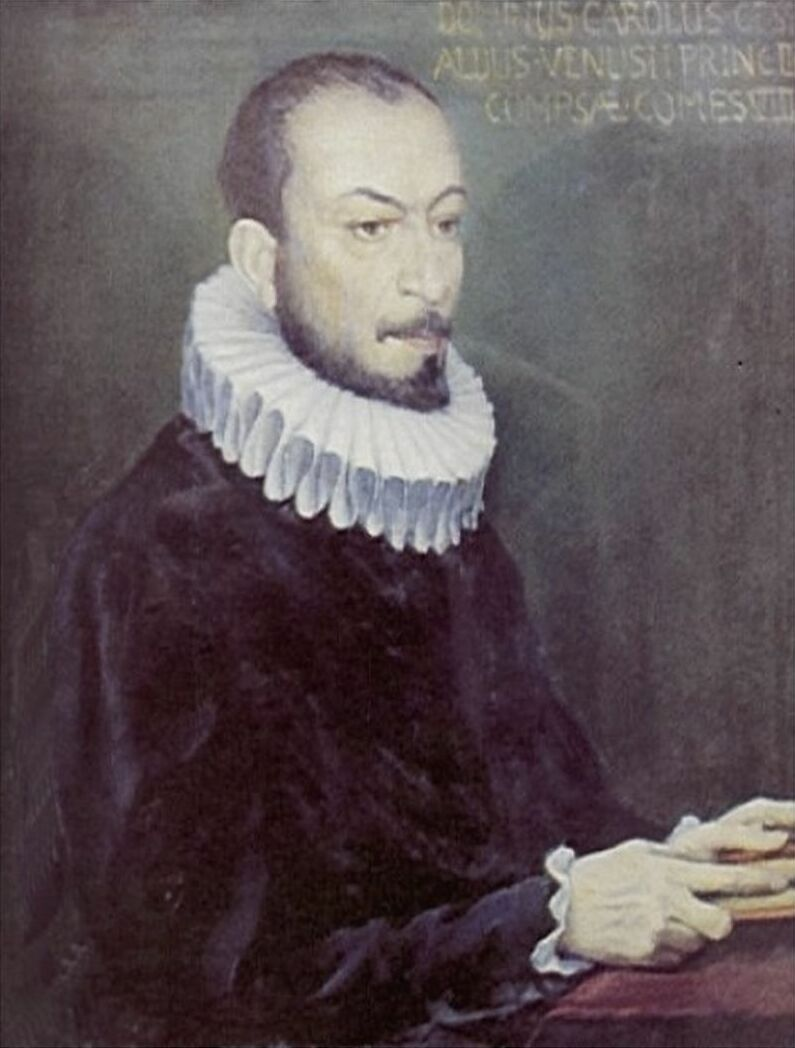

The year 1613 in music involved some significant events.

== Events ==
- February 15 – The Memorable Masque of the Middle Temple and Lincoln's Inn, written by George Chapman and designed by Inigo Jones, is performed at Whitehall Palace. The masque features music by Robert Johnson.
- February 20 – Francis Beaumont's The Masque of the Inner Temple and Gray's Inn is performed at Whitehall Palace. The work features music by John Coprario.
- December 26 – The Maske of Flowers by Thomas Campion and John Coprario is performed for the wedding of Robert Carr, 1st Earl of Somerset and Frances Howard at Whitehall Palace.
- Monteverdi becomes maestro di cappella at St Mark's Basilica, Venice.
- date unknown – Michael Praetorius joins the court of John George I, Elector of Saxony.

== Publications ==
- Agostino Agazzari – Dialogici concentus..., Op. 16 (Venice: Ricciardo Amadino)
- Gregor Aichinger – Zwey Klaglieder vom Tod und letzten Gericht (Dillingen: Gregor Hänlin)
- Giovanni Francesco Anerio
  - Third book of motets (Rome: Giovanni Battista Robletti)
  - Antiphons (Rome: Giovanni Battista Robletti)
  - First book of Sacri concentus (Rome: Giovanni Battista Robletti)
- Adriano Banchieri
  - Salmi festivi intieri, coristi, allegri, et moderni, Op. 33 (Venice: Ricciardo Amadino), a collection of psalms for four voices
  - Third book of nuovi pensieri ecclesiastici, Op. 35 (Bologna: Giovanni Rossi), a Vespers collection for one and two voices, harpsichord, theorbo, archlute, and organ
  - Duo in contrapunto sopra ut, re, mi, fa, sol, la, utile a gli figliuoli, & principianti, che desiderano praticare le note cantabili, con le reali mutationi semplicemente, & con il maestro (Venice: Giacomo Vincenti), a collection of musical exercises for aspiring singers
  - Duo spartiti al contrapunto in corrispondenza tra gli dodeci modi & otto toni... (Venice: Giacomo Vincenti), a collection of musical exercises for instrumentalists
  - Canoni musicali for four voices (Venice: Giacomo Vincenti)
- Lodovico Bellanda – Sacre laudi for solo voice with organ, theorbo, or similar instrument (Venice: Bartolomeo Magni)
- Giulio Belli – Concerti ecclesiastici for two and three voices (Venice: Bartolomeo Magni)
- Severo Bonini – Lamento d'Arianna in stile recitativo (Venice: Bartolomeo Magni for Gardano)
- Antonio Brunelli – Arie, scherzi, canzonette, madrigali for one, two, and three voices, Op. 9 (Venice: Giacomo Vincenti)
- Giulio Caccini – Fuggilotio musicale, Op. 2 (Venice: Giacomo Vincenti), a collection of madrigals, sonnets, arias, canzonas, and scherzi for one and two voices with archlute, harpsichord or other instrument
- Manuel Cardoso – Cantica Beatae Mariae Virgins for four and five voices (Lisbon: Pedro Craesbeck)
- Antonio Cifra
  - First book of Li diversi scherzi for one, two, and three voices, Op. 12 (Rome: Giovanni Battista Robletti)
  - Sixth book of motets for two, three, and four voices, Op. 13 (Rome: Giovanni Battista Robletti)
  - Second book of Li diversi scherzi for one, two, and three voices, Op. 14 (Rome: Giovanni Battista Robletti)
  - Litaniae Deiparae Virginis for eight and twelve voices, Op. 15 (Rome: Giovanni Battista Robletti)
- John Coprario – Songs of Mourning: Bewailing the Untimely Death of Prince Henry for one voice with lute or viol (London: John Browne), lyrics by Thomas Campion, commemorating the death of Henry Frederick, Prince of Wales, on the previous November 6
- Christoph Demantius – Fasciculus chorodiarum for five voices and instruments (Nuremberg: Balthasar Scherff for David Kauffmann), a collection of German and Polish dances
- Giacomo Finetti
  - Third book of cantiones for two voices with organ bass (Venice: Bartolomeo Magni)
  - Fourth book of sacrae cantiones for three voices with organ bass (Venice: Bartolomeo Magni for Gardano), also includes litanies of the Blessed Virgin Mary for four voices without organ
- Melchior Franck
  - Viridarium musicum (Musical Garden) for five, six, seven, eight, nine, and ten voices (Nuremberg: Georg Fuhrmann), a collection of motets
  - Concentus musicales for six and eight voices (Coburg: Justus Hauck), a collection of wedding songs
  - Ferculum Quodlibeticum for four voices (Coburg: Justus Hauck), a collection of quodlibets
- Pierre Guédron – Second book of airs de cours for four and five voices (Paris: Pierre Ballard)
- Luzzasco Luzzaschi – Seconda scelta delli madrigale a5, published posthumously
- Giovanni de Macque – Sixth book of madrigals for five voices (Venice: Bartolomeo Magni)
- Pomponio Nenna – First book of madrigals for four voices (Naples: Giovanni Battista Gargano & Lucretio Nucci)
- Pietro Pace
  - The first book of motets for 1. 2. 3. & 4. voices..., Op. 5 (Venice: Giacomo Vincenti)
  - The first book of madrigals for solo voice... (Venice: Giacomo Vincenti)
- Serafino Patta – Second book of sacred songs (Venice: Giacomo Vincenti)
- Peter Philips
  - Cantiones sacrae, octonis vocibus (Antwerp: Pierre Phalèse)
  - Gemmulae sacrae (Sacred Little Gems) for two and three voices with organ bass (Antwerp: Pierre Phalèse)
- Francis Pilkington – The first set of madrigals and pastorals of 3. 4. and 5. parts (London: William Barley for M. Lownes, J. Browne and Thomas Snodham)
- Salamone Rossi – a collection of sinfonie and gagliarde
- John Ward – The First Set of English Madrigals To 3. 4. 5. and 6. parts apt both for Viols and Voyces

== Classical music ==
- John Bull – God the father, God the son (performed at the wedding of Princess Elizabeth to Frederick V, Elector Palatine).
- Nicholas Lanier – Maske... at the Marriage of... The Earl of Somerset

== Opera ==
- Giordano Giacobbi – Proserpina rapita

== Births ==
- April 19 – Christoph Bach, court musician, grandfather of Johann Sebastian Bach (d. 1661)
- August 20 – Sophie Elisabeth, Duchess of Brunswick-Lüneburg, poet and composer (d. 1676)

== Deaths ==
- July 10 – Giulio Cesare Martinengo, composer and teacher (born c.1564)
- August 18 – Giovanni Artusi, music theorist and composer (born c. 1540)
- September 8 – Carlo Gesualdo, lutenist and composer (born 1560)
- ?October – Pomponio Nenna, composer of madrigals (born 1556)
