= Cosimo Bottegari =

Italian lutenist and composer

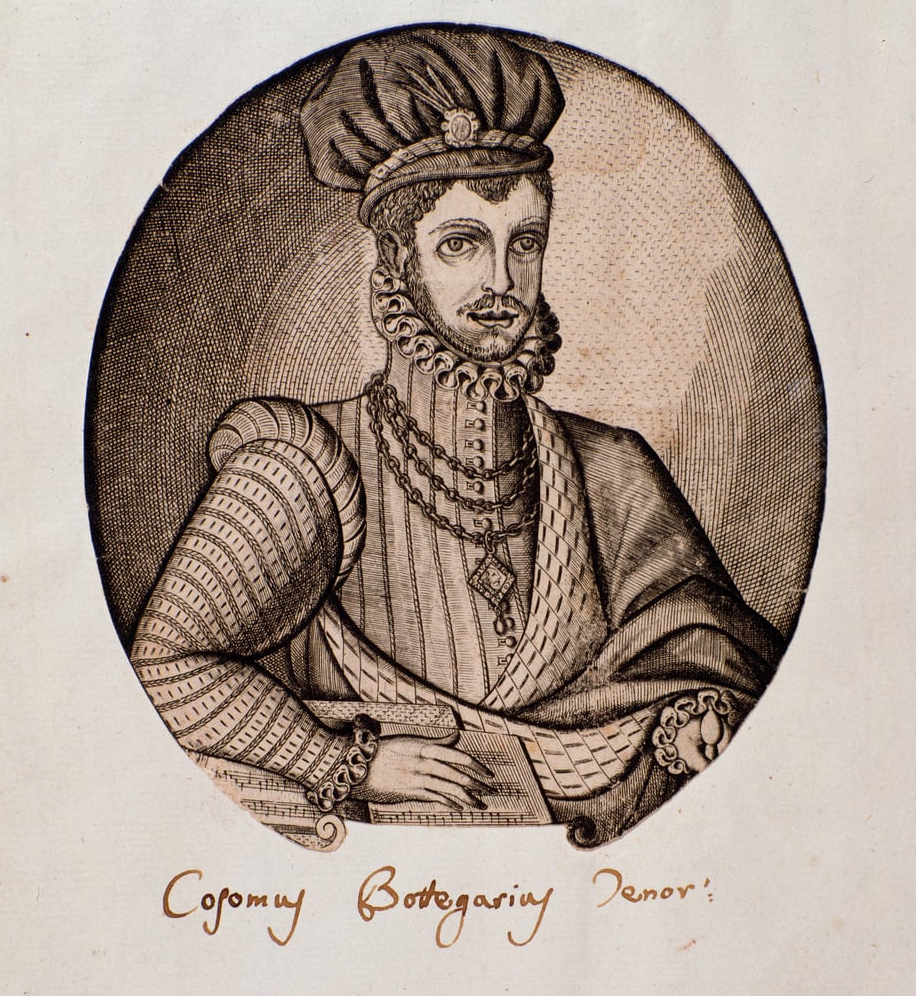
Cosimo Bottegari

Cosimo Bottegari (1554—1620) was an Italian lutenist and composer of the Late Renaissance era. He was born in Florence and in 1573 became a gentleman of the chamber of the Duke, at the court of Albert V, Duke of Bavaria in Munich, granted of the hereditary equestrian nobility of Bavaria in 1574, with the Heraldic chief of Bavaria and created a Knight of the Order of Saint Stephen 1577, by Francesco I de' Medici, Grand Duke of Tuscany. He left a manuscript of compositions titled Il Libro di canto e liuto which is an important source for Italian songs of the period.
