= Guillaume de Morlaye =

French Renaissance era lutenist, composer and music publisher

Guillaume de Morlaye (c.1510 – c.1558) was a French Renaissance era lutenist, composer, and music publisher. He was a pupil of Albert de Rippe and lived and worked in Paris. In 1552, he received a ten-year license to publish music from Henry II, and between 1553 and 1558, published four lute collections in cooperation with Michel Fezandat and six lute collections compiled by Albert de Rippe. He also published three books of his own four-course Renaissance guitar compositions during 1552–53, including fantasies and dances, and also lute arrangements of Pierre Certon and Claudin de Sermisy.
