= Lodovico Bellanda =

Italian composer and organist

Lodovico Bellanda (c. 1575 – after 1613) was an Italian composer and organist who lived in the transition period between the Renaissance and Baroque eras. He was born and worked most of his life in Verona, for which reason he was also known as Lodovico Veronese.

== Works ==
His earliest known volume, Canzonette (1593), contains 19 brief pieces in two repeated sections. Canzonette spirituali (1599) includes eight duets for soprano and tenor and two organ compositions. Il primo libro de madrigali (1602) contains 14 madrigals for five voices and one for eight; one copy of it has been in the Accademia Filarmonica di Verona since his lifetime. Sacrae cantiones (1604) contains 19 motets by Bellanda and one by Giuliano Corsini. One of the motets, O gloriosa domina is noteworthy for its dynamic markings for echo effects.

Bellanda's last three publications are primarily for solo voice and continuo, in line with the newest developments in Italian music. The two volumes of Musiche (1607 and 1610) comprise 30 madrigals, five arias and four dialogues. The madrigals include some striking harmonic and melodic progressions in response to emotive texts. One of the dialogues, Anima mia che pensi, uses a segment of text from Cavalieri's Rappresentatione di Anima, et di Corpo (Act 1 scene iv). Lastly, Sacre laudi (1613) contains 23 monodies with Latin texts.

== Publications ==
- Canzonette, 3vv (1593)
- Canzonette spirituali, 2vv, insts (1599)
- Il primo libro de madrigali, 5, 8vv (1602)
- Sacrae cantiones, 3–5vv (1604)
- Musiche … per cantare, 1, 2vv, chit, hpd (1607)
- Le musiche … per cantarsi, libro secondo, 1, 2vv, lute, hpd, other insts (1610)
- Sacre laudi, 1v, org/chit/other inst (1613)

== Bibliography ==
- G. Turrini: L'Accademia Filarmonica di Verona dalla Fondazione (maggio 1543) al 1600 e il suo patrimonio musicale antico (Verona, 1941), esp. 179, 197, 204, 210
- A. Gajoni-Berti: Dizionario dei musicisti e cantanti veronesi (1400–1966) (Verona, 1966)
- E. Paganuzzi: ‘Documenti veronesi su musicisti del XVI e XVII secolo’, Scritti in onore di Mons. Giuseppe Turrini (Verona, 1973), 547–75, esp. 547
- E. Paganuzzi and others: La musica a Verona (Verona, 1976)
