= Giovanni Battista Conforti =

Italian composer

Giovanni Battista Conforti (fl. 1550–1570) was an Italian composer, born either in Bologna or Parma. In the dedication to his Primo libro de ricercari a quattro voci (Valerio Dorico, Rome, 1558) he says that he "owes much" to Cardinal Niccolò Caetani of Sermoneta, for whom he had probably worked in Rome.

Conforti's Madrigali, libro primo (Venice, 1567), which Claudio Merulo supposedly edited, printed, and published, is dedicated to Anselmo Dandino, the abbot of San Bartolomeo in Ferrara. This work includes a piece, S'hoggi son senz 'honor, written in honor of Adrian Willaert, suggesting that Conforti was connected with Venice and the musicians of St Mark's Basilica. Conforti's ricercari are well respected for their use of idiomatic writing for a number of instruments.
