= Girolamo Belli =

Italian composer

Girolamo Belli (1552 – c. 1620) was an Italian composer and music teacher of the late Renaissance. He was closely associated with the Ferrara School in the 1580s, having previously studied with Luzzasco Luzzaschi, and was noted for his composition of both madrigals and sacred music.

== Life ==
Belli was born in Argenta, a town southeast of Ferrara, between Ferrara and Ravenna, and received some of his early music instruction from Luzzaschi. In his youth he went to Mantua, to sing in the Duke's private court establishment, and later he went to Rome. Sometime around 1580 he went to Ferrara, which contained, at the court of the Este family, one of the most progressive musical establishments of the late 16th century, and there he began to write madrigals in the pre-Baroque, monodic style of Luzzaschi.

Evidently Belli attempted to secure permanent employment at the Ferrara court, but he seems to have been unsuccessful. During the late 1580s he may have worked again for the Gonzagas in Mantua, but if so, the dates are not known. For most of the remainder of his life he worked in Argenta as maestro di cappella and music teacher, but since Argenta was a relative backwater compared to Ferrara, Venice, and the other cities in the region, Belli's fame never attained that of many of his contemporaries. Belli remained connected with Ferrara until his death, as a member of the Accademia degli Intrepidi; however after Ferrara was annexed by the Papal States in 1597, the music scene there declined, and its avant-garde character was extinguished. Belli probably died at Argenta around 1620.

== Music ==
Belli wrote both sacred and secular music. In general, his sacred music is in a conservative style in keeping with the years he spent in Rome, and influenced by the music of the Roman School there; his secular music, especially the madrigals, are in the progressive Ferrarese style which foreshadowed the musical Baroque. Much of his music, both sacred and secular, is lost. All of his music was published at either Ferrara or Venice.

Belli's sacred music includes psalm settings, Magnificats, Sacrae cantiones (sacred songs, similar to madrigali spirituali, but in Belli's case for up to 10 voices), and a lost book of masses. Stylistically these are both contrapuntal, in the manner of Palestrina, and occasionally polychoral, in the manner of the Venetian School, though without the opulent use of instrumental color and echo effects characteristic of the music of the Venetians.

More famous than his sacred music, however, is his output of madrigals in the virtuoso Ferrarese style of his teacher, Luzzaschi. He published five books of madrigals for five and six voices which have survived, as well as a book of canzonette for four voices; however at least seven books of madrigals or similar compositions have been lost. These compositions span the time from the early 1580s (his first publication was in Ferrara in 1583) to late in his life: his last publication was the ninth book of madrigals, for five voices (or instruments), in 1617, in Venice. In this last book his debt to Luzzaschi is most apparent, as four of the compositions contain extensive, and acknowledged, borrowings from his teacher.

Several madrigals from the lost books of Belli were copied by Francis Tregian the Younger, the supposed copyist of the Fitzwilliam Virginal Book, while in prison in England; they survive in a manuscript kept in the British Library (GB-Lbl)

== References and further reading ==
- Iain Fenlon: "Girolamo Belli", Grove Music Online, ed. L. Macy (Accessed April 16, 2006), (subscription access)
- Gustave Reese, Music in the Renaissance. New York, W.W. Norton & Co., 1954. ISBN 978-0-393-09530-2
