= Ippolito Ciera =

Italian composer

Ippolito Ciera (fl. 1546–1561) was an Italian composer of the Renaissance, active at Treviso and Venice.

Little is yet known about his life, for neither his biography nor his works have yet been the subject of a scholarly study. He was a Dominican friar and sang at Treviso Cathedral: the earliest documentary record of his life is a payment in 1546 for his salary there. In addition to singing, he taught music to the novices at the convent of San Nicolò. By 1561, he had become maestro di cappella, the choirmaster, at the church of San Giovanni e Paolo in Venice, a much more prestigious position, and incidentally in one of the musical centers of Europe. He probably knew Adrian Willaert, the founder of the Venetian School, and may have studied with him, as did many of the musicians in Venice at that time; his veneration for the elder master is shown in a laudatory sonnet he wrote and set to music for him. It is No. 12 in his first book of madrigals.

All of Ciera's known music is vocal. His complete surviving output amounts to a single setting of the mass, four motets, and two published collections of madrigals. Dates of the works range from 1554 to 1561, with the two books of madrigals – the first for four voices, and the second for five – published in 1554 and 1561, respectively. Ciera's style in his sacred music (the motets and mass) was akin to that of the Netherlanders, with dense pervading imitation. His madrigals, on the other hand, use chordal harmonies, and occasionally what was referred to as the "note nere" technique ("black note" for "filled in notes" – i.e. quick note values, running passages, alternating with other textures). Some of the madrigals are antiphonal in places, reminiscent of the polychoral style of the Venetian School.
