= Philibert Jambe de Fer =

French Renaissance composer of religious music

Philibert Jambe de Fer (fl. 1548–1564) was a French Renaissance composer of religious music.

This composer is only known from his publications. The first known publication is a chanson for 4 voices (a motet), which dates from 1548. It appeared in print in Lyon, just like his last known composition (1564). In 1564 he composed the music for the 'Arrival' of King Charles IX, to whom he also dedicated his psalms. In his theoretical work Epitome musical, des tons, sons, et accordz...Violes & violons (1556) the instrument we now call a violin is described for the first time in musical history.

== Works ==
- 1555 Les Psaumes du royal Prophète David traduits... par Clément Marot, J.Poitevin, M. Scève, Lyon
- 1561 Les 22 Octonaires du Psaumes 119, par Jean Poitevin, Lyon
- 1564 Les 150 Psaumes de David à 4 et 5 voix, Lyon
