= Pierre Clereau =

French composer, choirmaster and possibly organist

Pierre Clereau (died before 11 January 1570) was a French composer, choirmaster and possibly organist of the Renaissance, active in several towns in Lorraine, including Toul and Nancy. He wrote both sacred and secular vocal music, in Latin, French, and Italian. Among his many compositions is a Requiem mass, as well as some sacred songs influenced by the Huguenot psalm style; he is not known, however, to have converted to Protestantism.

== Life ==
Little is known about his life but what can be read on the title pages of his publications, and found in a few records in cathedral archives in Lorraine. In 1554, he was in Toul working as a choirmaster, as stated on the title page of two volumes of sacred music published by Parisian Nicolas Du Chemin. However, he had a considerably earlier start as a composer, since some of his secular music had been published already in Lyon in 1539. One of these same songs was also published simultaneously in Paris, and attributed to the young Pierre Certon, a composer with a similar musical style as well as a similar name.

Two other possible posts are known for Clereau: he is mentioned as an organist in Toul in 1558, and he also held a post at the church of St. George's in Nancy from some time in the 1550s until his death, which occurred between 1567 and 1570. René, Marquis of Elbeuf, was a patron and supporter of Clereau, and assisted in the publication of his work by the prestigious, and monopolistic, royal printers of Le Roy & Ballard in Paris.

== Music and influence ==
Clereau wrote only vocal music, or perhaps only vocal music has survived. He wrote both sacred and secular music, including mass settings, a Requiem mass, motets, Cantiques spirituels (spiritual songs: chansons with sacred texts), and numerous chansons. Unusually for a French composer, he also composed Italian madrigals.

Clereau wrote his masses in an imitative style. These works are all parody masses, and are based on motets by Pierre Certon, Thomas Crecquillon and Jean Maillard. His other sacred music, particularly the Cantiques spirituels, shows the influence of the Huguenots, the French Protestant composers of the 16th century, with their simple homophonic textures and melodic line in the topmost voice; in addition, one of them uses a tune taken from the Genevan Psalter, an extremely unusual thing for a Roman Catholic composer to do during the Wars of Religion. Some of these may have been written before the outbreak of the war in 1562.

His secular music either uses the imitative style of the first generation of Parisian chanson writers, especially for older texts, or the more current homophonic style for settings of more recent verse. As with many of the chanson composers of the time, he liked setting the poetry of Pierre de Ronsard. Most of his secular chansons are for three voices; his Cantiques spirituels are for four.

Clereau's music was published both in Lyons and Paris.
