= Simon Boyleau =

French composer

Simon Boyleau (fl. 1544–1586) was a French composer of the Renaissance, active in northern Italy. A prolific composer of madrigals as well as sacred music, he was closely connected with the court of Marguerite of Savoy. He was also the earliest documented choirmaster at the church of Santa Maria presso San Celso in Milan.

== Biography ==
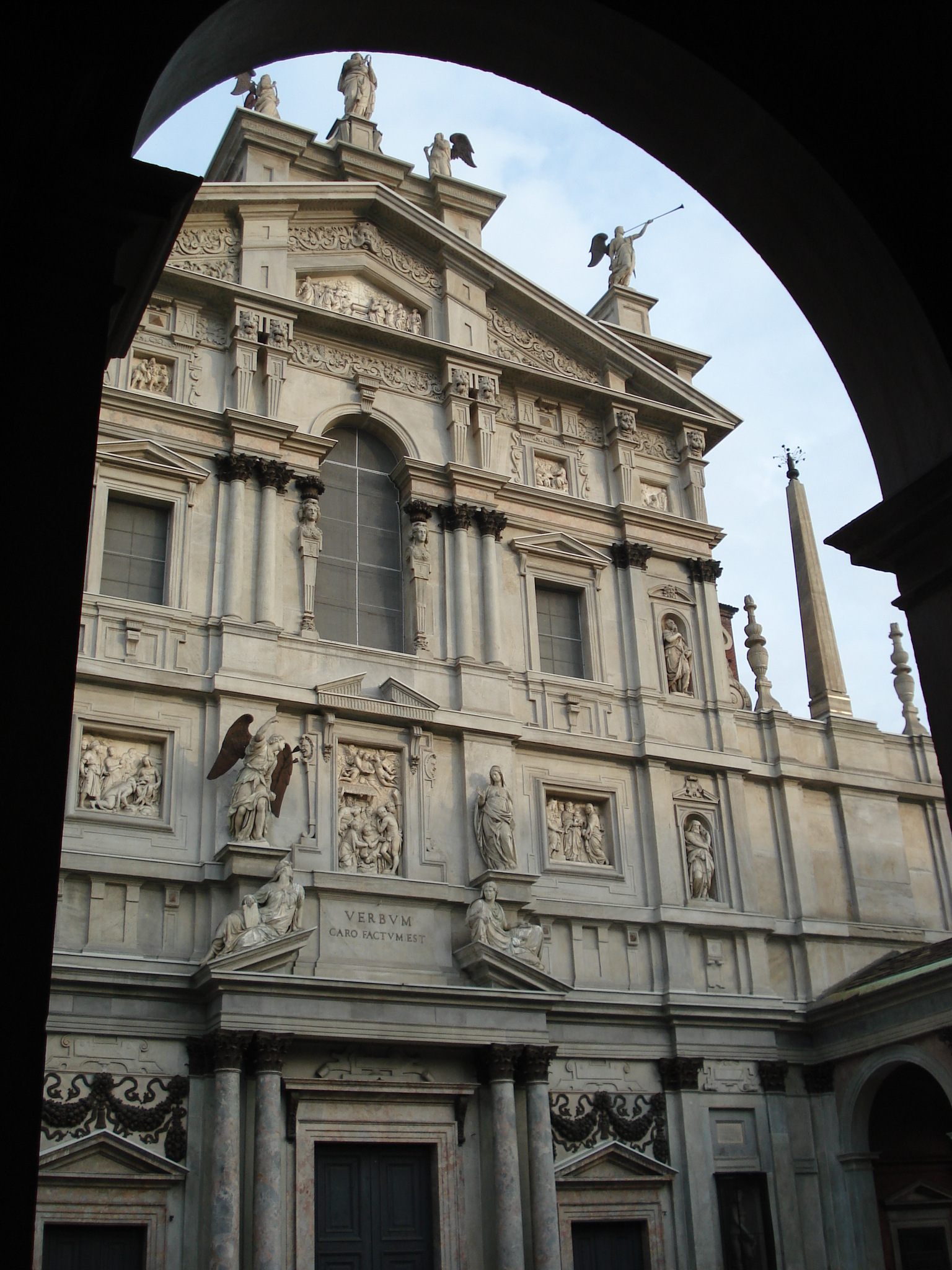
Façade of Santa Maria presso San Celso. Boyleau, in 1558, was the earliest documented choirmaster at this church.

Nothing is known of his early life. A French origin is indicated by three bits of evidence: his name, a dedication he left in a manuscript book of madrigals, in which he said he was of French nationality, and a comment by the Paduan publisher of his 1546 collection of madrigals for four voices that he was French. During this period many musicians from France and the Low Countries came to Italy after receiving their early musical training in the north; employment and patronage prospects were greater in Italy throughout most of the 16th century.

Although the exact events are not documented, scholars have inferred that Boyleau probably spent his first Italian years in Venice, due to musical influences seen in his work as well as their publication history. In 1551 he became maestro di cappella (choirmaster) at Milan Cathedral, his earliest documented post; he held this position until 1557, at which time he was replaced by Hoste da Reggio. Boyleau's next position was as maestro di cappella at the church of Santa Maria presso San Celso, also in Milan; he was the first documented maestro di cappella at this institution, and he stayed there until around 1569. In 1572 Milan Cathedral hired him again, first as assistant to Vincenzo Ruffo, and then as maestro di cappella, the job he had left (or been dismissed from) fifteen years before. The Cathedral dismissed him again in 1577.

Boyleau had long had close ties with the court of Marguerite of Savoy, as evident from music he dedicated to Marguerite and her husband, Emanuele Filiberto, many years earlier; these ties helped him gain a post at Turin Cathedral in 1582. Turin was then the capital of the Duchy of Savoy, thanks to the terms of the Peace of Cateau Cambrésis which ended the Italian War of 1551–1559. Boyleau kept this post until 1585, but it is not known how long he lived after dismissal, or if he stayed in Turin. A payment record from the Savoy court in 1586 indicates he was still alive in that year.

== Music and influence ==
Boyleau wrote both sacred and secular music. Everything which has survived is vocal, although some of his compositions were later intabulated for instruments.

His sacred music was conservative and tended to be modest, as could be expected for a musician working in Milan, the home of Cardinal Carlo Borromeo, the principal force behind the musical reforms during the Council of Trent (complex polyphony, unclarity of diction, and "immodesty" were among the qualities for which contemporary musicians were criticized by the Council). He wrote a book of motets which he dedicated to Giovanni da Legge, the procurator at St. Mark's in Venice in 1544; he may have been seeking a job there, the most prestigious musical institution in northern Italy. After moving to Milan he wrote a series of settings of the Magnificat which he dedicated to Borromeo. Stylistically these works are in conformance with the dictates of the Council of Trent in their scope, declamation, and overall.

Boyleau's secular music consists of madrigals and canzoni, published or copied in six books, only three of which have survived. His style spans the period from the late 1530s or early 1540s, the early history of the madrigal, as it was practiced in Venice, to the 1560s, at which time composers were experimenting with chromaticism and greater textural contrast; Boyleau showed in his work that he kept current with prevailing trends.
