= Filippo Azzaiolo =

16th-century Italian composer

Filippo Azzaiolo (Sometimes spelled: Assaiuolo) was a 16th-century Italian composer. His surviving compositions were published in three collections issued between 1557 and 1569. The dedicatees each have links to Bologna, so it seems likely that Azzaiolo himself had connections to that city.

Azzaiolo's Chi passa per 'sta strada was adapted by English composer William Byrd. The contemporary composer Panayiotis Demopoulos has also written a set of variations for woodwind quintet on the same violetta, issued by Dunelm Records and published by anaeresis.
