= Jacobus de Kerle =

Flemish composer and organist

Jacobus de Kerle (Ypres 1531/1532 - Prague 7 January 1591) was a Flemish composer and organist of the late Renaissance.

== Life ==
De Kerle was trained at the monastery of St. Martin in Ypres, and held positions as a singer in Cambrai and choirmaster in Orvieto, where he also became organist and carillonneur. After entering the priesthood, he began having his music printed, including a 1561 collection of psalms and Magnificat settings in Venice. He was commissioned to write Preces Speciales set to texts by the Dominican Pedro de Soto for the Council of Trent, which he completed by 1562, and visited the city during the time of the Council in his travels with Otto Truchsess von Waldburg, cardinal of Augsburg. Although he did not take part in their discussions, the performance of the Preces Speciales reportedly influenced the deliberations of the Council Fathers on sacred music.

In 1565, he was appointed director of music at Ypres Cathedral, though he would lose this position after being excommunicated on March 30, 1567, due to a dispute with another priest and thus lost his office. After performing the imposed penances in Rome, he was received again in the church.

From there he moved to Rome and then to Augsburg, where he was offered a position in 1568 as vicar-choral and organist at the Augsburg Cathedral by Cardinal Otto Truchsess von Waldburg. He stayed there until 1574, when he was passed over for the open Kapellmeister position at Augsburg. After leaving Augsburg in 1575, his whereabouts are unknown until 1579, when he appears in the registers of the Cambrai Cathedral; he continued to move often late in his life, accepting positions in Mons, Cologne, Augsburg again, Vienna, and finally Prague, where he lived from 1583 until his death in 1591.

== Works ==
All of de Kerle's extant music is vocal polyphony, and it combines the stylistic elements of the Franco-Flemish school of the generation after Josquin (exemplified by composers such as Adrian Willaert and Nicolas Gombert) with that of late Renaissance Italian composers such as Palestrina. De Kerle did not make as much use of simple homophony and direct text-setting as did many of his post-Tridentine contemporaries, such as Palestrina and Vincenzo Ruffo, nor did he often employ the heavy chromaticism of the late 16th-century madrigal, and his compositions display a measure of restraint and clarity that mark them as heavily indebted to Northern contrapuntal practice.

His surviving works include masses for four and five voices (he is known to have composed six-voice masses, but these have been lost), motets, psalms, hymns, and sacred songs. Very little of his secular vocal music has survived; a print of madrigals and one of settings of Petrarch are both lost, though one book of six-voice secular songs is extant, as well as a number of pieces in surviving print and manuscript collections.

== Recording ==
- Kerle, Jacobus de. Vocal music. Paul Van Nevel/Huelgas Ensemble. Harmonia Mundi 901866
