= Giulio Fiesco =

Italian composer

Giulio Fiesco (possibly born ?1519, fl. 1550–1570) was an Italian composer of the Renaissance, active in Ferrara, known for his madrigals. He was the first composer to set the poetry of Giovanni Battista Guarini, the most often-set poet by madrigalists of the late 16th century, and was an important court composer for the rich musical establishment of the Este family in Ferrara.

== Life ==
Details of Fiesco's life are sketchy. He was probably born in Ferrara and seems to have spent most of his life there. François-Joseph Fétis, the 19th-century French musicologist, claimed dates of 1519 to 1586 for Fiesco, but as he did not give his sources, it is not known if he had access to some documentation no longer extant. Alfred Einstein also reports these dates in The Italian Madrigal, with the additional detail that Fiesco was likely a lutenist. Fiesco was connected to the Estense court as indicated by the dedications in his madrigal collections, and may have been employed at the church of San Francesco, since he is buried there. It is also possible that he was employed personally by Cardinal Ippolito II d'Este.

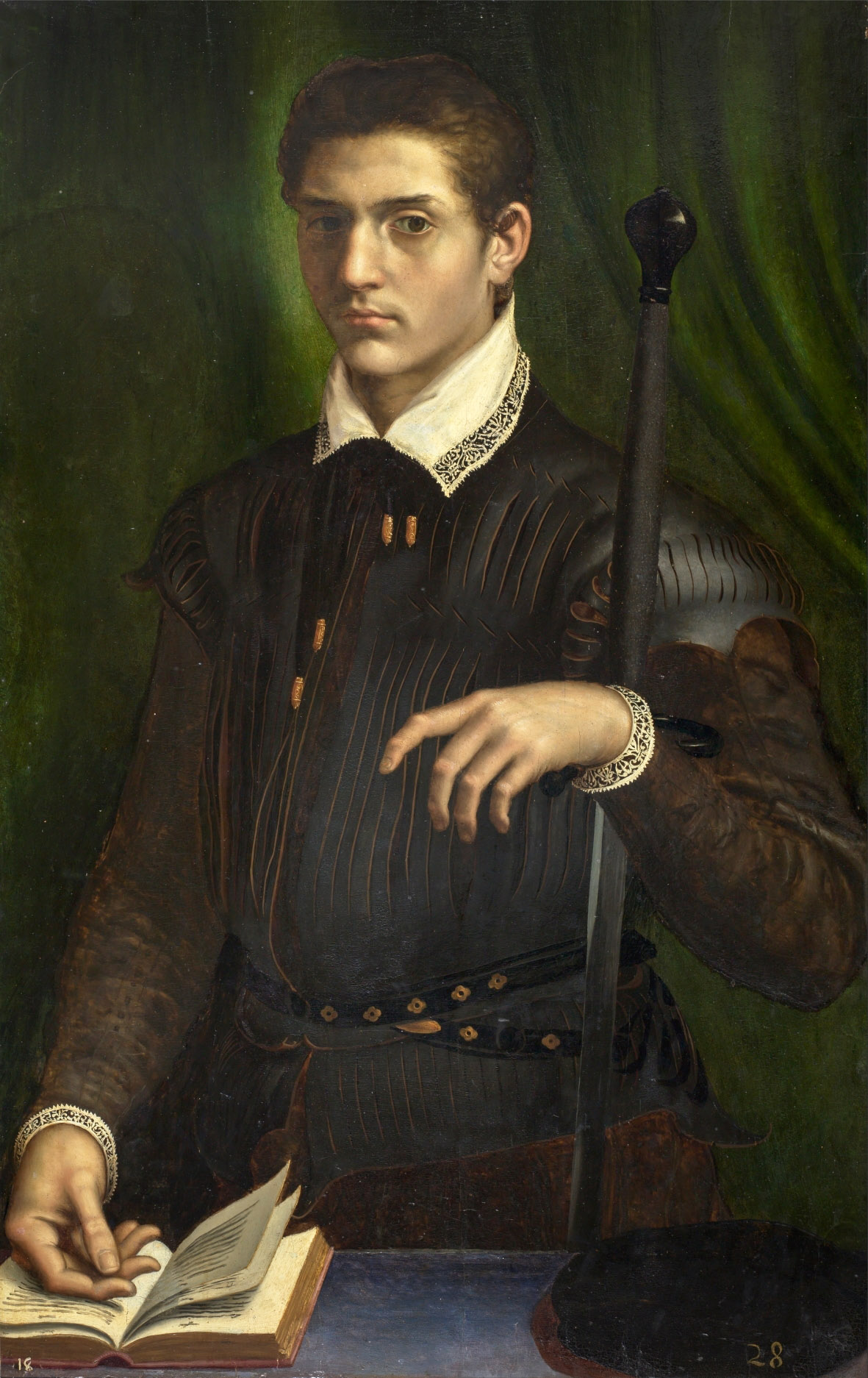
Alfonso II d'Este, Fiesco's patron

In 1567 the poet Giovanni Battista Guarini entered into the service of Alfonso II d'Este, Duke of Ferrara. No poet was more influential on music history in the late Renaissance than Guarini, whose works were set more often by madrigal composers than those of any other poet; Fiesco was significant as the first composer ever to set Guarini's poetry to music. Not only did he set poetry by Guarini, but in the dedication to the madrigal book he claimed he wrote it at the poet's request: and he dedicated the entire group of compositions to Lucrezia and Leonora d'Este.

Fiesco is not mentioned in any known payment records from Ferrara, a useful source of information on musicians, and he vanishes completely from written record around 1570. The publication dates of his madrigal collections range from 1554 to 1569.

== Works and influence ==
All of Fiesco's surviving works are secular and vocal. He published four books of madrigals, in 1554, 1563, 1567, and 1569, dedicating all four to members of the Este family. Of these four books, the first and last have gotten the most attention. His compositions in the first book of 1554 show most directly the influence of Cipriano de Rore, the most renowned mid-century composer of madrigals, who was then the maestro di cappella in Ferrara for Duke Ercole II d'Este. Fiesco's compositions in this book are for four voices, and include madrigals in the classic style, chromatically experimental works (for example Bacio soave, which shows also the influence of Nicola Vicentino, who actively encouraged such experiments), as well as music likely intended for performance at dramatic events staged for the Este family. His poetry settings include works by Boccaccio, Giovanni Batista Strozzi, Bernardo Tasso, Sannazaro, Ludovico Ariosto, and Petrarch.

Fiesco's last book of madrigals, the Musica nuova, for five voices, is his most famous, for it is the first appearance of the poetry of Guarini set to music. Fourteen out of the fifteen poems in the collection are sonnets, and the style matches the elegance of the language, attaining considerable virtuosity in text setting. Some of the settings are innovative harmonically and rhythmically, with one madrigal, S'armi pur d'ira disdegnoso ed empio, foreshadowing the Baroque stile concitato of rapid declamation over a homophonic texture.

Not all of Fiesco's works are madrigals. He published a few secular songs in lighter current forms such as the greghesca and the napolitane, forms of Venetian and Neapolitan origin respectively.
