= Martin Agricola =

German Renaissance composer and music theorist (1486–1556)

Martin Agricola (6 January 1486 – 10 June 1556) was a German composer of Renaissance music and a music theorist. (Note: Four other Agricolas (Alexander, died 1506; Johann, flor. 1600; Wolfgang Christoph, flor. 1630; and Georg Ludwig, 1643–1676) are known as composers between the end of the 15th century and the middle of the 17th. In the 18th century Charles Burney, in the course of his tour in Germany (1772), was much impressed by Johann Friedrich Agricola (1720–1774), court composer and director of the royal chapel to Frederick the Great (Chisholm 1911).)

== Biography ==
Agricola was born in Świebodzin, a town in Western Poland, and took the name Agricola later in life, a common practice among Lutherans often meant to emphasize humble, peasant origins. From 1524 until his death, he lived in the German city of Magdeburg, where he was a teacher or cantor in the Protestant school. Georg Rhau, a publisher and senator in Wittenberg, was Agricola's close friend and publisher.

Agricola's theoretical writing was valuable in expounding the change from the old to the new system of musical notation. His Musica instrumentalis deudsch (English: German Instrumental Music), published in 1528, 1530, 1532 and 1542, and then heavily revised in 1545, was one of the most important early works in organology and on the elements of music.

Agricola was the first to harmonize in four parts Martin Luther's famous chorale, "Ein feste Burg ist unser Gott" (English: "A Mighty Fortress Is Our God".
