= Francesco Portinaro =

Italian composer

Francesco Portinaro (c. 1520 – ?1578) was an Italian composer and humanist of the Renaissance, active both in northern Italy and in Rome. He was closely associated with the Ferrarese Este family, worked for several humanistic Renaissance academies, and was well known as a composer of madrigals and dialogues.

== Life ==
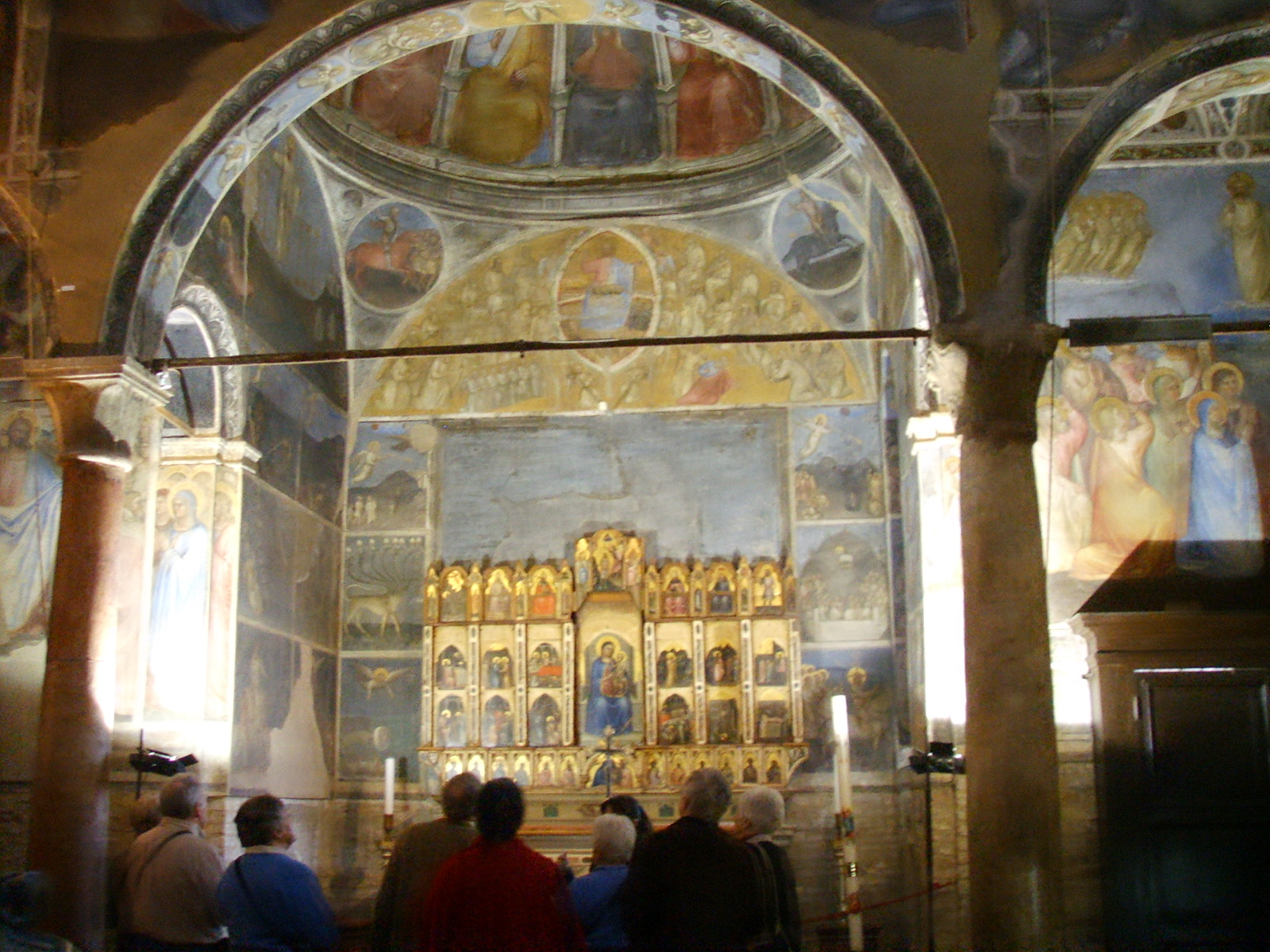
Interior of the baptistry at Padua Cathedral. Portinaro worked at the cathedral as maestro di cappella in the 1570s

He was born in Padua around 1520. While he published a book of motets in Venice in 1548, no biographical details are available for the period before 1550. He was the son of a Paduan official, was married to Laura d'Este, and was resident in the Este palace in Padua. In 1555 he applied unsuccessfully for the post of maestro di cappella, music director, at the city's cathedral, and failing in this enterprise, spent the rest of the decade in humanistic as well as musical pursuits. In particular, he had an active life working for four secular groups: a group of musicians in Padua, and three humanistic academies in Vicenza, Padua, and Verona. One of his master was Lorenzo Barozzi. Such academies were becoming common in the late 16th century, as a part of the Renaissance rebirth of humanistic thought; in music they were the location of the first experiments with monody and multi-voice dramatic vocal forms, the strands of which would eventually coalesce into opera.

The first of Portinaro's associations was an unnamed group he founded himself, which existed to further the musical careers of its members, which he created on 21 June 1555. Upon the dissolution of this fraternity he moved to Vicenza, where he joined the Accademia dei Costanti in that city, a society of humanists to which he dedicated his 1557 book of madrigals. In March 1557 he was back in Padua, for the newly formed Accademia degli Elevati. Of this group, some records survive of its specific activities, and his role in them. There were approximately forty members of the academy; unlike the original Accademia Filarmonica in Verona, the members themselves did not seem to do most of the music-making. Portinaro was hired as maestro, and he was to find professional assistants to perform for the academy members. Their sessions, which involved lectures, speeches, and discussions about secular and Latin poetry and other humanistic topics, frequently began and ended with musical performances by Portinaro and his group. In addition, Portinaro and his assistants, of which there were three listed in the records, were required by the terms of his employment to teach singing, instrumental performance, and other aspects of music to any of the members who wished it. The organization did not survive long – in 1560 it dissolved, for reasons unknown. Portinaro dedicated a book of madrigals for them that year.

Next he went to Verona, where the Accademia Filarmonica hired him for a year beginning in 1561. At the end of the year he was replaced by Ippolito Chamaterò, who held the post for the next two years. Scipione Gonzaga was the recipient of a madrigal book of Portinaro's in 1563, in Padua; Gonzaga himself founded an academy in that city, the Accademia degli Eterei, though Portinaro is not known to have been associated with them directly. From 1564 to 1566 or 1568 Portinaro was in Rome, in the service of Cardinal Ippolito II d'Este as music director for his considerable musical establishment – he had a group of 15 singers, with instrumentalists and an organist. Ippolito was a prominent patron of the arts, and brought much of the sumptuousness of the Ferrara Este court with him to the Holy City; he was also a patron of Giovanni Pierluigi da Palestrina around the same time that Portinaro was there. Portinaro probably wrote much of his sacred music, mostly motets, during his tenure in Rome.

There is some dispute over whether he remained in Rome after 1566: he may have moved to the service of Cardinal Luigi d'Este, but no documentation survives other than the suggestive dedication to Luigi d'Este of some motets that Portinaro published in 1568. Musicologist Alfred Einstein believed that Portinaro was in Venice sometime around 1567 as a printer and publisher, not of music but poetry, including verse by Pietro Bembo and others. Whether he went to Venice or not, in 1568 Portinaro moved back to Padua, and then later that same year went to Vienna, most likely to apply for the vacant post of choirmaster at the court of Maximilian II. Unsuccessful in this endeavor, he returned to Padua sometime before March 1569, and he seems to have spent the rest of his life in his native city.

In 1573 a new academy in Padua, the Accademia degli Rinascenti, hired him as music-master with duties similar to those he had held at the previous academy of the Elevati; he even hired as assistants some of the same people who had helped him before. Different this time was the existence of a rival academy in Padua, the Accademia degli Animosi, but neither academy lasted for long. Competition from nearby Venice, one of the major musical centers of Europe at the time, was too intense to allow for multiple such institutions in Padua, and just three years later, in 1576, an outbreak of bubonic plague killed 12,000 in the city and ended most of the significant musical activity there for years. Portinaro himself survived the plague, and was hired as maestro di cappella at Padua Cathedral in December 1576, staying there at least through August 1577, from which month a payment record survives. Cathedral archives indicate that he was dead in by January 1579, at which time the administration was searching for his replacement; however the date and circumstances of his death are not known.

== Music and influence ==
Portinaro wrote both sacred and secular vocal music, and also left a handful of lute intabulations, his only known instrumental music. His secular vocal music, which consisted of madrigals and dramatic dialogues, was the best-known portion of his output. He published six books of madrigals and dialogues in all, for between four and eight voices, as well as three books of motets. A few madrigals and motets were published separately, and an unpublished setting of the mass, Missa Surge Petre for 6 voices, survives in the Munich Bayerische Staatsbibliothek BSB-Hss Mus.ms. 45.

Most of his secular vocal music he seems to have written for the academies of which he was the maestro. He periodically gathered the pieces, madrigals and dramatic dialogues, into sets to publish and to dedicate to the academies and his aristocratic patrons. The madrigals show the influence of the Venetian School composers such as Adrian Willaert; in musical style they are polyphonic, reserved, and avoid the manneristic and experimental style of some of the mid-century composers such as Cipriano de Rore also working in the Venetian orbit. However Portinaro was innovative in developing dramatic characterization in his dialogues, an important predecessor to opera. An example composition was one he wrote for Maximilian II in Vienna, the first piece in the 1568 Vergini collection. This work, for seven voices, features the Seven Muses, who have been exiled and seek a peaceful new home: the home they find is the imperial court in Vienna. Unlike the Muses, Portinaro failed to find a home there, but the piece shows the contemporary trend towards dramatic characterization, with single voices representing single characters, and it also demonstrates the era's increasing use of secular stories, largely drawn from classical antiquity.

Portinaro likely wrote most of his motets both while in Rome in the service of Cardinal Ippolito II d'Este, and some date from his earliest, undocumented years. These works also show the influence of Netherlandish polyphony such as practiced by Willaert in nearby Venice.

The only instrumental music assigned to Portinaro is a series of lute intabulations which he published in Venice within the book on lute-playing by Florentine humanist, music theorist, lutenist, and composer Vincenzo Galilei (the father of the astronomer). Galilei likely made the intabulations himself, as Portinaro is not known to have been a lutenist. The publication was called Fronimo dialogo di Vincentio Galilei fiorentino, nel quale si contengono le vere et necessarie regole del intavolare la musica nel liuto, and appeared in several editions in 1568, 1569 and 1584.
