= Jacquet of Mantua =

French composer

Jacquet of Mantua (Jacques Colebault, dit Jachet de Mantoue) (1483 – October 2, 1559) was a French composer of the Renaissance, who spent almost his entire life in Italy. He was an influential member of the composers between Josquin and Palestrina, and represents well the developments in polyphonic style between those two composers.

== Life ==
Jacquet was born in Vitré (Ille-et-Vilaine) and probably went to Italy at an early age. He was in Modena in 1519, working for the Rangoni family, and in 1525 was in Ferrara at the Este court, where he formed a close friendship with Adrian Willaert, the founder of the Venetian School. The next year he moved to Mantua, where he spent the rest of his life. He became maestro di cappella at the cathedral of Saint Peter, where his employer was Cardinal Ercole Gonzaga, the Bishop of Mantua. Cardinal Ercole Gonzaga was fond of Jacquet, and the relationship was mutually beneficial; when Gonzaga became the president of the Council of Trent, and the most enthusiastic supporter of the Counter-Reformation, he was a forceful advocate for the music of his favorite composer.

In addition to being recognized by his employer, the Medici popes Leo X and Clement VII also praised his music. Much of Jacquet's music circulated widely, especially his motet Aspice Domine which appeared in over 30 contemporary sources.

Jacquet seems to have died in debt, a strange occurrence for one so well-connected and esteemed, especially by the Medici; however his family received a pension from Cardinal Ercole.

== Music ==
Jacquet wrote almost exclusively sacred vocal music. He was attentive to the trends of the time, and his music shows a clear stylistic progression from an early reliance on late 15th century practices to a later grasp of the pervasive imitation used by the generation of composers after Josquin. His craftsmanship is careful, and his counterpoint is fluid and graceful; parts are well-balanced, and occasional homophonic sections break the prevailing polyphonic texture. Most of his music is full-textured, with all voices singing.

He wrote 23 masses which have survived, and well over 100 motets. Many of the motets are for state occasions: arrivals of dignitaries, marriages, tributes, laments and so forth. Only three secular works have survived, and those are most likely early compositions; the more zealous leaders of the Counter-Reformation had a low opinion of secular music, and Jacquet seems to have obliged them.

In his later years, his music was simpler, and he wrote many hymns. The tendency of the Council of Trent at this time was to encourage relatively simple music in which the words could be clearly understood; Jacquet was both following this trend, and showing the natural development of a style which had embraced complex polyphony early, and which later sought simplicity and clarity.

== Recordings ==
- 2025 - Jacquet of Mantua: Motets and Secular Songs. The Choir of Sidney Sussex College, Cambridge, Kirsty Whatley (Harp), David Skinner (Conductor). Resonus Limited.
- 2015 - Jacquet of Mantua: Missa Surge Petre & motets. The Brabant Ensemble, Stephen Rice (Conductor). Hyperion CDA68088.
- 2003 - Jachet de Mantoue: Lamentations de Jérémie. Ensemble Jachet de Mantoue. Calliope CAL 9340.
