= Pierre Certon =

French composer

Pierre Certon (ca. 1510–1520 – 23 February 1572) was a French composer of the Renaissance. He was a representative of the generation after Josquin and Mouton, and was influential in the late development of the French chanson.

== Life ==
Most likely he was born in Melun, but he lived most of his life in Paris. The earliest records of his life date from 1527, when he was in the service of the king. In 1530 he was charged with playing ball at Notre Dame Cathedral as well as refusing to go to a service, both dangerous irreverences that almost cost him prison time—but he was young enough to be forgiven. From this event a birthdate between 1510 and 1520 can be inferred. In 1536 he became a master of choristers at the Sainte-Chapelle (choir), and he remained at this post, with a few additional benefices, for the rest of his life.

Another post he held late in his life – concurrently with his activity in Paris – was as canon at the cathedral in Melun. He seems to have helped organize many grand entertainments, and doubtless composed many of his works for them. Most likely he was a close friend of the more famous composer Claudin de Sermisy, as evidenced by his dedications, notes, and the poignant lament he wrote for his death in 1562, which was closely modeled on the similar work by Josquin for the death of Johannes Ockeghem.

== Music and influence ==
Certon wrote eight masses that survive, motets, psalm settings, chansons spirituelle (chansons with religious texts, related to the Italian madrigali spirituali), and numerous secular chansons. His style is relatively typical of mid-century composers, except that he was unusually attentive to large-scale form, for example framing longer masses (such as his Requiem) with very simple movements, with the inner movements showing greater tension and complexity. In addition he was skilled at varying texture between homophonic and polyphonic passages, and often changing the number and register of voices singing at any time.

His chanson settings were famous, and influential in assisting the transformation of the chanson from the previous light, dance-like, four-part texture to the late-century style of careful text setting, emotionalism, greater vocal range, and larger number of voices. Cross-influence with the contemporary Italian form of the madrigal was obvious, but chansons such as those by Certon retained a lightness and a rhythmic element characteristic of the French language itself.

== Bibliography ==
- Article "Pierre Certon", in The New Grove Dictionary of Music and Musicians, ed. Stanley Sadie (London: Macmillan, 1980), ISBN 1-56159-174-2
- Gustave Reese, Music in the Renaissance (New York: W. W. Norton & Co., 1954), ISBN 0-393-09530-4
- Harold Gleason and Warren Becker, Music in the Middle Ages and Renaissance (= Music Literature Outlines Series I) (Bloomington, Indiana: Frangipani Press, 1986), ISBN 0-89917-034-X
