= Claude Goudimel =

French composer, music editor and publisher

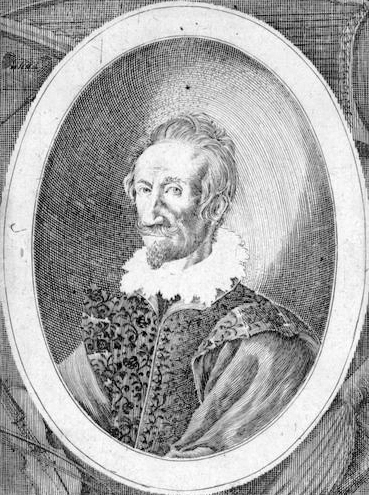
Claude Goudimel

Claude Goudimel (c. 1514 to 1520 – between 28 August and 31 August 1572) was a French composer, music editor and publisher, and music theorist of the High Renaissance.

== Biography ==
Claude Goudimel was born in Besançon, modern-day France, which at that time was a French-speaking imperial city of the Holy Roman Empire. Few details of his life are known until he is documented in Paris in 1549, where he was studying at the University of Paris; in that year he also published a book of chansons. In the early 1550s he worked with printer Nicolas Du Chemin, and may have still been studying at the University of Paris until 1555; by 1555 he was also Du Chemin's partner in the publishing business.

Goudimel moved to Metz in 1557, converting to Protestantism, and is known to have been associated with the Huguenot cause there; however he left Metz due to the increasing hostility of the city authorities to Protestants during the Wars of Religion. First he settled in his native town of Besançon, and later moved to Lyon.

It is thought that Goudimel was murdered in Lyon in August 1572, during the St. Bartholomew's Day Massacre, along with much of the Huguenot population of the city. However, his last letter to his close friend and poet Melissus, showing Goudimel sick with fever on 23 August 1572, allowed M. Weckerlin to suggest that instead of dying in the massacre of Saint Barthelemy, the master could simply have died in his bed; but there is no definitive evidence either way.

The death of Goudimel inspired among the versifiers of this time a respectable number of epitaphs, sonnets and other famous pieces in French, Latin and Greek. That by J. Posthius begins with these lines:

Claudius, the sweet,
was preferred above the song of the swans,
and [was] the Orpheus of our time.

== Music and influence ==
Goudimel is most famous for his four-part settings of the psalms of the Genevan Psalter, in the French versions of Clément Marot. In one of his four complete editions he puts - unlike other settings at the time - the melody in the topmost voice, the method which has prevailed in hymnody to the present day. Jean-Jacques Rousseau, quoted by Woodward, admired these settings, writing 'The harmony is certainly the most majestic and sonorous that can be possibly heard'.

In addition he composed masses, motets, and a considerable body of secular chansons, almost all of which date from before his conversion to Protestantism (probably around 1560).

In 1554, he became the editor of a large collection of masses, motets and Magnificat of several composers, a collection printed by Nicolas Duchemin, and in which Goudimel appeared as the author of seven Latin and Catholic works. In the year following, Goudimel, still at Duchemin's, brought out a book of pieces for four voices of his composition on the Odes of Horace. However, he felt some contrition about setting work of the pagan poet, and in 1557 he wrote: "To Monsieur de La Bloctière, Mr. Claude Belot, Angevin, advocate in the court of Parliament of Paris, C. Goudimel, his good friend, wishes good health. Sir, ... [I] present to you this third book of Music of mine on the divine verses of the divine and royal Prophet. Also in no way could I choose the man, who seems to me to favor this little work of better heart than you, who alone amiably forced me to change, even quit, the profane lyre of the profane poet Horace, to memorize in hand and boldly undertake to touch and wield the sacred harp of our great David."

Goudimel's stay in Metz lasted several years. It was there that he addressed, in 1564, the dedication of his first complete psalter to "Mgr Roger de Bellegarde, ordinary gentleman of the king's room," and, in 1565, that of the second psalter to "Mgr d'Auzances, knight of the Order and lieutenant general of the king." On 18 March 1565 he was named godfather of a child at the reformed church of this city. In 1566, he published his seventh book of psalms in the form of motets. It was, therefore, after his departure from Paris that the celebrities Adrien le Roy and Robert Ballard published his masses in 1558; and it was also during his time in Metz that Goudimel began to concentrate all of his artistic ability in the various musical interpretations of the French translation of the psalms by Clément Marot and Théodore de Bèze. He worked on the continuation of his large collection of motet-shaped psalms, and wrote almost simultaneously two different versions of the complete psalter, each containing one hundred and fifty psalms.

Goudimel's style tends to be homophonic, with an intriguing use of syncopated rhythm and melisma and staggered voice entries to bring out inner parts, especially in the chansons. His Psalm settings, however, are more polyphonic, characteristic of the moderate contrapuntal style exemplified by the chansons of Jacques Arcadelt, an approximate contemporary.

The widespread claim that he taught Palestrina is now regarded as untenable. His Opera Omnia extends to 14 volumes, though several of his works are fragmentary, missing one or more voices.

== References and further reading ==
- Michel Brenet, Claude Goudimel: Essai Bio-bibliographique. Besançon, Imprimerie et Lithographie de Paul Jaquin, 1898.
- Gustave Reese, Music in the Renaissance. New York, W.W. Norton & Co., 1954. ISBN 0-393-09530-4
- The Concise Edition of Baker's Biographical Dictionary of Musicians, 8th ed. Revised by Nicolas Slonimsky. New York, Schirmer Books, 1993. ISBN 0-02-872416-X

== Discography ==
- Psalms de la Réforme (Psalms of the French Reformation), Ensemble Claude Goudimel: Naxos, 1995.
- Psaumes et Chansons de la Réforme (Psalms and Anthems of the Reformation), Dominique Visse, Ensemble Clement Janequin: Harmonia Mundi, 2000.
- Claude Goudimel (1514–1572): Six Psaumes; Mass (Missa) 'Le Bien Que J'Ay': Erato, 2017.
