= Valerio Dorico =

Italian typographer

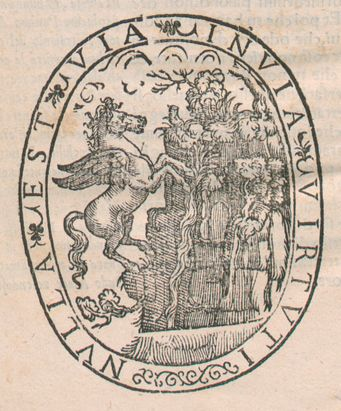
Dorico's mark (BEIC)

Valerio Dorico (Brescia, sixteenth century - Rome, late sixteenth century) was an Italian typographer. Over a period of sixteen years (1539–1555) he printed numerous editions, pioneering the use of a single impression printing process first developed in England and France. He worked primarily for the Roman Academy with his brother Ludovico Dorico. Dorico printed first editions of sacred music by Giovanni Pierluigi da Palestrina and Giovanni Animuccia.

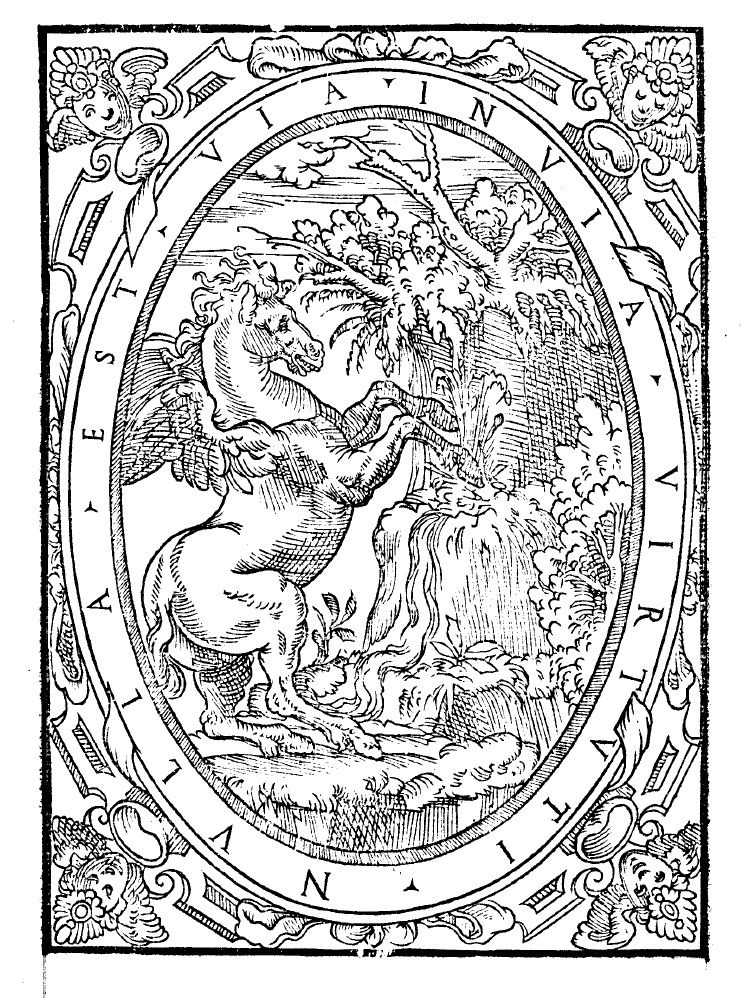
Dorico's mark

The scorewriter Dorico is named in his honor.
