= Girolamo Scotto =

Italian composer

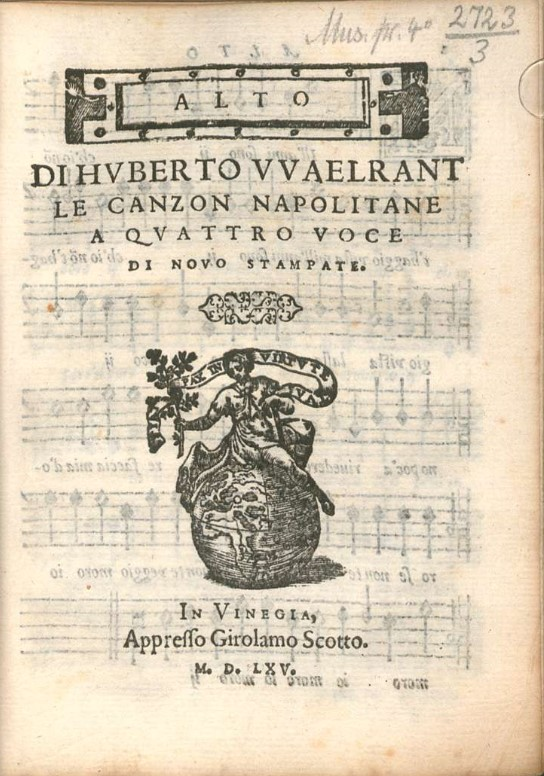
Title page of 'Di Hvberto Vvaelrant le canzon napolitane a qvattro voce' by Hubert Waelrant, published by Girolamo Scotto in 1565

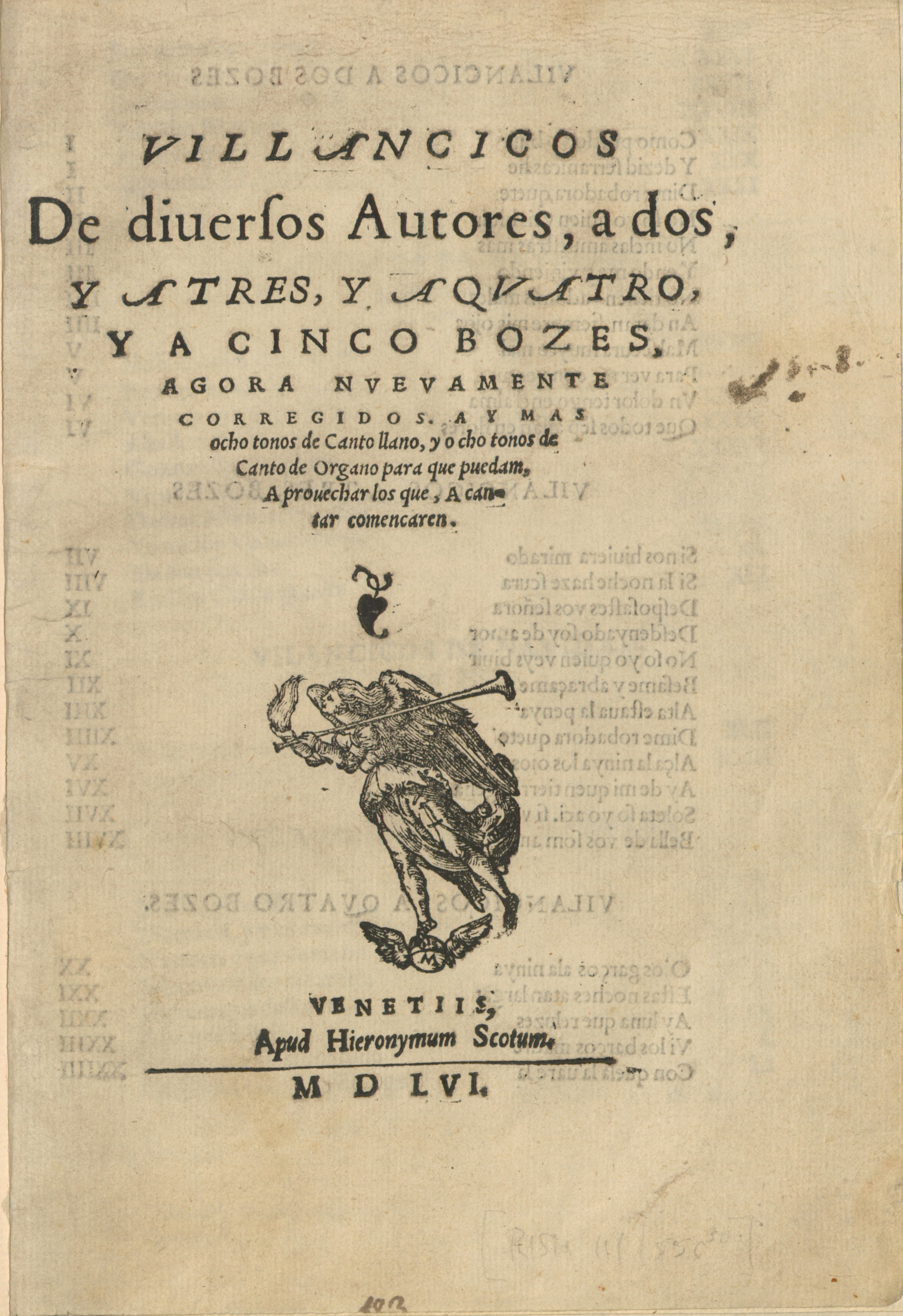
Title page of 'Cancionero de Upsala', published by Scotto in 1556 using his Latinized name

Girolamo Scotto (Hieronymus Scotus; also Gerolamo) (c.1505 – 3 September 1572) was an Italian printer, composer, businessman and bookseller of the Renaissance, active mainly in Venice. He was the most influential member of the firm of Venetian printers, the House of Scotto, which existed from the late 15th century until 1615. At its peak in the 1560s, the Scotto firm under Girolamo was one of the preeminent publishing firms of Europe, producing volumes on law, scholasticism, philosophy, medicine, theology, and ancient literature in addition to music. Only the firm of Gardano produced more books of music in the 16th century than the House of Scotto under Girolamo; over half of Scotto's publications, 409 out of approximately 800 in total, were books of music.

== Life and work ==
Girolamo was one of six children of Bernardino Scotto, of Milan (1447–1537). Born in Milan, his early life is undocumented, and prior to the first appearance of his name on a Scotto-published book in 1539, his name appears only once in the historical record: in a petition to the Venetian Senate dated 1536 requesting a printing privilege for a work of scholastic philosophy by Marcantonio Zimara on Averroes' commentaries on Aristotle. He married Cesaria Sinistri, who survived him, as she was the executor of his will; they probably had no children. Most likely he was involved in the firm during the 1530s, learning both the craft and the trade. Some Scotto-published books of madrigals of Philippe Verdelot – dated 1536 and 1538 – show idiosyncrasies associated with Girolamo's later work, and may have been typeset by him.

In 1539 Girolamo took over operation of the family business from his brother Ottaviano II. While Ottaviano lived until at least 1566, he seems to have had little further control over the firm, although he continued to publish. In her book on the Scotto firm, Jane Bernstein suggests that Ottaviano may have been ill, since he made two separate wills in the 1540s; he also may have preferred to devote his time to his other interests, such as philosophy and medicine, happily giving over the business aspect of the publishing house to his younger brother. Girolamo acquired control of the publishing house at a singularly opportune time. Venice was entering into a several-decade-long period of peace and prosperity, and capitalist, commercial enterprises were doing well. There was an enormous demand for madrigals, a relatively new musical form proving immensely popular in Italy, and through the technological advance of single-impression music printing – in which blocks of type imprinted a portion of staff along with a note – Girolamo was able to mass-produce music to meet the market demand. In addition to producing music books he also continued the firm's tradition of publishing other subjects, such as philosophy, medicine, law, theology, and other matters, and all the while composing and publishing his own music.

The Scotto and Gardano firms together formed an effective monopoly on the publishing industry not only in Venice, but in all of Italy. Gardano, unlike Scotto, published only music. Rather than compete fiercely, as Gardano did with a small firm in Ferrara, the two houses worked together more often than not, often borrowing from each other, seemingly having worked out an understanding that both houses could profit from their arrangement. In the 33 years of their domination of the Italian market, Scotto produced over 800 publications – approximately a complete print run of a new book or set of music parts every two weeks.

Having the monopoly, a healthy market for his products, and a network of booksellers throughout Italy and Sicily, Scotto acquired considerable wealth during the middle decades of the 16th century. Tax records, and his will, mention his ownership of numerous rental properties and cultivated fields, many in the vicinity of Padua. In 1571 he was elected as priore to the Venetian Guild of Printers and Booksellers, which included in its membership all of the notable figures in the business in Venice. Girolamo died on 23 September 1573, and was buried in the monastic church of San Francesco della Vigna in Venice.

On Girolamo's death in 1572, the Scotto firm passed to Girolamo's heir, his nephew Melchiorre Scotto. On Melchiorre's death in 1613, it was dissolved and its assets put up for public auction since Melchiorre's designated heir was considered by the Venetian authorities to be illegitimate.

== Music ==
Scotto's music, all secular and vocal, was written for his market, and was largely didactic. He wrote 220 compositions which he published himself, many of them madrigals for two or three voices. Two-voice madrigals were a relative rarity at the time, but useful for teaching, and for amateurs; most madrigals were for four or five voices. Stylistically they kept up with current trends, and he probably learned from the composers whose works he published; in fact he sometimes paraphrased their work in his own. One of his compositions was a setting of Petrarch's sonnet Padre del ciel, doppo i perduti giorni. This serious work, a sonnet of contrition and renunciation emblematic of the Counter-Reformation, was set by only one other composer: the renowned Cipriano de Rore.
