= 1540s in music =

- 1530s
- 1540s in music

Music timeline

The decade of the 1540s in music (years 1540–1549) involved some significant events.

== Events ==
- 1540
  - 4 April – Cristobal Morales leaves the position of master of the choristers at the Chapel of the Papal Basilica in St. Peter's, Rome
  - 23 April – Thomas Tallis loses his job at Waltham Abbey due to the Dissolution of the Monasteries
  - 27 April – Gioseffo Zarlino is elected capellini and mansionario of the Scuola di San Francesco in Chioggia
  - 1 May – Ambrose Lupo is taken on as a musician and composer at the court of Henry VIII
  - 30 December – Jacques Arcadelt is appointed maestro di cappella at the Sistine chapel in Rome
  - December – Nicolas Gombert dismissed from his position at the court chapel of the Emperor, Charles V
- 1541
  - 25 May – Cristobal Morales re-joined the Papal choir at St. Peter's, Rome
  - 15 July – Jacques Buus appointed second organist at the basilica of S Marco, Venice
- 1542
  - 3 April – Francisco Guerrero joined the Seville Cathedral choir as a contralto
- 1543: Thomas Tallis becomes a Gentleman of the Chapel Royal in England.
  - 20 July Tielman Susato is granted a three-year privilege to print music in the Netherlands.
- 1544
  - 28 October Giovanni Pierluigi Da Palestrina appointed organist at San Agapito Church, Palestrina
- 1545
  - 1 May Bartolomeo de Escobedo appointed maestro di cappella at the chapel of the Papal Basilica at St Peter's in Rome.
  - 1 May Cristobal Morales was granted 10 months leave from the Papal Chapel in Rome. He never returned.
  - 31 August Cristobal Morales succeeded Andres de Torrentes as maestro di capilla at Toledo Cathedral.
- 1547
  - 6 May Waclaw of Szamotuly joined the Chapel Royal of Sigismund II Augustus of Poland in Vilnius.
  - 28 May Jacques Arcadelt reappointed maestro di cappella at the Sistine chapel.
  - 12 June Giovanni Pierluigi da Palestrina marries Lucrezia de Goris in his home town of Palestrina, Lazio
  - 9 August Cristobal Morales leaves the position of maestro di cappella at Toledo Cathedral.
  - Bologna's first public theatre, the Teatro Della Sala, was opened. It burned down in 1623.
- 1548 François Roussel appointed maestro di cappella at St. Peter's, Rome
- 1549 Juan Francisco de Penalosa succeeded Francisca Sacedo as principal organist of Toledo Cathedral
  - Balint Bakfark appointed court lutenist to King Sigismund Augustus of Poland

== Bands formed ==
- 1548: Staatskapelle Dresden formed in Saxony.

== Publications ==
=== 1540 ===
- Sebald Heyden – De arte canendi, third installment, important treatise on singing
- Francesco de Layolle – 25 canzoni for five voices (Lyon: Jacques Moderne)
- Hubert Naich – Exercitium Seraficum for four and five voices (Rome: Antonio Blado), a collection of madrigals
- Hans Neusidler – Ein newes Lautenbüchlein (Nuremberg: Hans Guldenmundt), a collection of lute music
- Alfonso dalla Viola – Il secondo libro di madrigali for four voices (Ferrara: Henrico De Campis)
- Claudio Veggio – Madrigali a quattro voci, published in Venice

=== 1541 ===
- Martin Agricola – Book of Protestant hymns Sangbuchlein, published in Wittenberg.
- Jhan Gero – Il Primo Libro de Madrigali Italiani et Canzoni Francese a due voci (Venice: Antonio Gardano)
- Nicolas Gombert
  - Second book of motets for five voices (Venice: Girolamo Scotto)
  - Second book of motets for four voices (Venice: Girolamo Scotto)
- Giovanni Domenico da Nola – Canzone villanesche, books 1 and 2, for three voices (Venice: Girolamo Scotto)
- Giordano Passetto – Madrigali nuovi a voce pare, book 1 (Venice: Antonio Gardano)

=== 1542 ===
- Benedictus Appenzeller – Des Chansons a Quattre Parties (Antwerp: Henry Loys & Jehan de Buys), a collection of chansons for 4 voices
- Jacques Arcadelt – First book of madrigals for three voices (Venice: Antonio Gardano), "together with some madrigals by Costanzo Festa along with twelve French chansons and six new motets"
- Pierre Certon
  - Second book of motets for four voices (Paris: Pierre Attaingnant & Hubert Jullet)
  - Third book of motets for four voices (Paris: Pierre Attaingnant & Hubert Jullet)
- Domenico Ferrabosco – First book of madrigals for four voices (Venice: Antonio Gardano)
- Silvestro Ganassi dal Fontego – Regola rubertina, Venice
- Johannes Lupi – Third book of motets for four voices (Paris: Pierre Attaingnant & Hubert Jullet), published posthumously
- Cipriano de Rore – First book of madrigals a5.

=== 1543 ===
- Jacques Buus – First book of French chansons for six voices (Venice: Antonio Gardano)
- Sebastian z Felsztyna – Directiones musicae ad cathedralis ecclesia premislensis usum, Kraków
- Silvestro Ganassi dal Fontego – Lettione seconda [=second book of Regola rubertina], Venice
- Balthasar Resinarius – Responsorium numero orctoginta de tempore et festis...libri duo
- First known songs by Ebran are published by Pierre Attaingnant

=== 1544 ===
- Jacques Arcadelt – Il Quinto Libro di Madrigali for 4 voices (Venice: Antonio Gardano)
- Paolo Aretino – Sacra responsoria (Venice: Gerolamo Scotto)
- Jacquet de Berchem – "Ala Dolc'ombra de le Belle Frondi" published by Antonio Gardano in Venice.
- Simon Boyleau – Motets for four voices (Venice: Girolamo Scotto)
- Francesco Corteccia – First book of madrigals for four voices (Venice: Girolamo Scotto)
- Cristóbal de Morales
  - First book of masses, for four and five voices (Rome: Valerio and Luigi Dorico)
  - Second book of masses, for four, five, and six voices (Rome: Valerio and Luigi Dorico)
- Hans Neusidler – three books of lute music: Das erst Buch: ein newes Lautenbüchlein, Das ander Buch: ein new künstlich Lautten Buch, and Das dritt Buch: ein new künstlich Lauten Buch.
- Georg Rhau – Newe Deudsche Geistliche Gesenge published in Wittemberg.
- Cipriano de Rore – Il secondo libro de madrigali for 5 voices published in Venice.
- Tielman Susato (ed.)
  - Third book of chansons, for four voices (Antwerp: Tielman Susato), contains only compositions by Thomas Crecquillon
  - Fifth book of chansons, for five and six voices (Antwerp: Tielman Susato), contains mostly compositions by Nicolas Gombert

=== 1545 ===
- Perissone Cambio
  - Madrigals for five voices (Venice: Antonio Gardano)
  - Canzone villanesche alla napolitana for four voices (Venice: Antonio Gardano)
- Vincenzo Fontana – First book of canzone villanesche alla napolitana for three voices (Venice: Antonio Gardano)
- Guillaume Le Heurteur – 12 Motets (Paris: Pierre Attaingnant)
- Pierre de Manchicourt – Modulorum musicalium, tome one, for four voices (Paris: Pierre Attaingnant), a collection of motets
- Gian Domenico del Giovane da Nola – Madrigali for four voices (Venice)
- Cipriano de Rore – Motets for five voices
- Vincenzo Ruffo – Li madrigali a notte negre for four voices published in Venice
- Tielman Susato (ed.)
  - Ninth book of chansons, for four voices (Antwerp: Tielman Susato), contains only compositions by Pierre de Manchicourt
- The Lutheran hymnal Geistliche Lieder published by Valentin Babst in Leipzig

=== 1546 ===
- Giovan Thomaso di Maio – Canzone villanesche a3, book 1.

=== 1547 ===
- Giovanni Animuccia – First book of madrigals for 4, 5, and 6 voices (Venice: Antonio Gardano)
- Loys Bourgeois – First book of four-part psalms (Lyon: Godfroy & Marcelin Beringen frères), published for the Calvinists of Geneva using the French translations by Clément Marot.
- Jacques Buus – First book of ricercars for four voices or instruments (Venice: Antonio Gardano)
- Perissone Cambio – First book of madrigals for four voices (Venice: Antonio Gardano), also includes a few madrigals by Cipriano de Rore
- Francesco Corteccia
  - New expanded edition of the first book of madrigals for four voices, including pieces composed for intermedii for the comedy Il furto by Francesco d'Ambra (Venice: Antonio Gardano)
  - Second book of madrigals for four voices (Venice: Antonio Gardano)
  - First book of madrigals for five and six voices (Venice: Antonio Gardano)
- Claude Gervaise, ed. – Second book of dances for four instruments (Paris: Pierre Attaingnant)
- Heinrich Glarean – Dodecachordon published in Basel.
- Hoste da Reggio – First book of madrigals for four voices (Venice: Antonio Gardano)
- Hans Neusidler – Das erst Buch: ein newes Lautenbüchlein
- Caspar Othmayr
  - Bicinia sacra (Nuremberg: Johann Berg and Ulrich Neuber)
  - Symbola for five voices (Nuremberg: Johann Berg and Ulrich Neuber), a collection of motets
- Dominique Phinot – First book of motets for five voices (Lyon: Godefroy & Marcellin Beringen)
- Enriquez de Valderrabano – Book of vihuela music Libra de musica de vihuela intitulado Silva de Sirenas published in Valladolid

=== 1548 ===
- Benedictus Appenzeller – A collection of sacred songs without a title (Augsburg: Philip Ulhart)
- Arnold Caussin – First book of motets for five voices (Venice: Antonio Gardano)
- Heinrich Faber – Beginner's music textbook Compendium Musicae published in Nuremberg.
- Didier Lupi Second
  - First book of spiritual chansons for four voices (Lyon: Beringen & Beringen), all texts by Guillaume Guéroult
  - Third Book, containing 35 chansons for four voices (Lyon: Beringen & Beringen)
- Tugdual Menon – Madrigali d'amore for four voices (Ferrara: Giovanni de Buglhat & Antonio Hucher)
- Jan Nasco – Madrigals for five voices (Venice: Antonio Gardano)
- Dominique Phinot
  - Second book of motets for six, seven, and eight voices (Lyon: Godefroy & Marcellin Beringer)
  - First book of thirty-seven chansons (Lyon: Godefroy & Marcellin Beringer)
  - Second book containing thirty-six chansons (Lyon: Godefroy & Marcellin Beringer)
- Francesco Portinaro – Primi frutti de motetti for five voices (Venice: Antonio Gardano)
- Cipriano de Rore – Il terzo libro de madrigali a cinque voci (Third Book of Madrigals for Five Voices) published in Venice.

=== 1549 ===
- Gasparo Alberti – First book of masses (Venice: Girolamo Scotto), the first printed book of masses dedicated to a single Italian composer
- Paolo Aretino – Libro primo delli madrigali cromati (Venice: Girolamo Scotto)
- Jacques Buus
  - Second book of ricercars (Venice: Antonio Gardano)
  - First book of Intabolatura d'organo di recercari (Venice: Antonio Gardano), a collection of ricercars in organ tablature
  - First book of motets for five voices (Venice: Antonio Gardano)
- Ghiselin Danckerts – Canons for four voices (Augsburg: Melchior Kriesstein)
- Nicolao Dorati – First book of madrigals for five voices (Venice: Antonio Gardano)
- Jhan Gero
  - Libro primo delli madrigali a quatro voci (Venice: Girolamo Scotto)
  - Libro secondo delli madrigali a quatro voce (Venice: Girolamo Scotto)
- Claude Goudimel – book of chansons.
- Clement Janequin – XXX chansons nouvelles
- Didier Lupi Second – 30 Psalms for four voices (Lyon: Beringen & Beringen), French translations by Gilles D'Aurigny
- Hans Neusidler – Das ander Buch: ein new künstlich Lauten Buch
- Giovanni Domenico da Nola – First book of motets for five voices (Venice: Girolamo Scotto)
- Caspar Othmayr
  - Tricinia (Nuremberg: Johann Berg & Ulrich Neuber)
  - Reutterische unnd Jegerische Liedlein for four voices (Nuremberg: Johann Berg & Ulrich Neuber)
- Robert Wedderburn (probable) – The Complaynt of Scotland, including the earliest known references (in Middle Scots) to a number of Border ballads
- Gioseffo Zarlino – Moduli motecta vulga noncupata liber primus – book of motets for 5 voices

== Sacred music ==
=== 1541 ===
- Gasparo Alberti – Magnificat

=== 1542 ===
- Gasparo Alberti – Magnificat

=== 1547 ===
- Louis Bourgeois – published his first 4-voice psalms

== Births ==
=== 1540 ===
- date unknown – Giovanni Maria Artusi, Italian composer and theorist (d. 1613)
- probable – William Byrd, English composer (d. 1623)
- probable – Jakob Regnart, Franco-Flemish composer (d. 1599)
- probable – Girolamo Dalla Casa, Italian composer, cornetist and writer (d. 1601)
- probable – William Daman, Flemish recorder player, organist and composer (d. 1591)
- probable – Giovanni Dragoni, Italian composer (d. 1598)
- probable – Noel Fagnient, Flemish composer and shopkeeper (d. c. 1600)
- probable – Johannes de Fossa, Flemish composer and choirmaster (d, 1603)
- probable – Marcin Leopolita, Polish composer and musician (d. c. 1585)
- probable – Francesco Rovigo, Italian composer and organist (d. 1597)
- probable – Alexander Utendal, Flemish singer, composer and choirmaster (d. 1581)
- probable – Matthaus Waissel, German lutenist, composer, Lutheran theologian, publisher, schoolteacher and writer (d. 1602)

=== 1541 ===
- September 7 – Hernando de Cabezon, Spanish composer, publisher and editor (d. 1602)
- probable – Vincenzo Bellavere, Italian composer and organist (d. 1587)

=== 1542 ===
- January 27 – Gioseffo Guami, Italian composer, organist, singer and teacher (d. 1611)
- February 22 – Santino Garsi da Parma, lutenist and composer (d. 1604)
- May 20 – Gasparo da Salo, Italian violin maker and double bass player (d. 1609)
- November 1 – Tarquinia Molza, Italian singer (d. 1617)
- probable – Cesare Bendinelli, Italian trumpeter (d. 1617)
- probable – Jakob Meiland, German composer, organist and choirmaster (d. 1577)

=== 1543 ===
- Alfonso Ferrabosco the elder, Anglo-Italian composer (d. 1588)
- Andreas Pevernage, Flemish composer and choirmaster (d. 1591)
- Giovanni Maria Nanino, Italian composer, teacher, tenor and choirmaster (d. 1607)

=== 1544 ===
- Maddelena Casulana, Italian composer, lutenist and singer. First female composer of the period to have her music printed and published.
- Ivo de Vento, Flemish composer and organist (d. 1575).

=== 1545 ===
- October 19 – Giovenale Ancina – Italian priest and composer (d. 1604)
- probable
  - Gioseppe Caimo, Italian composer and organist (d. post 1584)
  - Luzzasco Luzzaschi, Ferrarese composer (d. 1607)
  - Lodovico Balbi, Italian composer, singer, choirmaster and Minorite friar (d. 1604)
  - Antoine Barbe II, Flemish organist and choirmaster (d. 1604)
  - Gioseppe Caimo, Italian composer and organist (d. 1584)
  - Bernardo Clavijo del Castillo, Spanish composer, organist, harpsichord player and teacher (d. 1626)
  - Anthony Holborne, English composer (d. 1602)

=== 1546 ===
- date unknown – Luca Bati, Italian composer (d. 1608)

=== 1547 ===
- April 8 – Lucrezia Bendidio, Italian noblewoman and singer (d. c. 1584)
- George de la Hele, Flemish composer (d. 1586).
- Manuel Mendes, Portuguese composer (d. 1605).

=== 1548 ===
- Gines Perez De La Parra, Spanish composer (d. 1600).
- Lambert de Sayve, Flemish singer and composer (d. 1614).
- Tomas Luis de Victoria, Spanish composer, singer, organist, priest and choirmaster (d. 1611).

=== 1549 ===
- December 9 – Costanzo Antegnati – Italian organ builder, organist, and composer (d. 1624).
- December 24 – Kaspar Ulenberg, German theologian, poet, and composer (d. 1617)
- Eustache du Caurroy, French composer and singer (d. 1609)
- Giovanni de Macque, French composer, singer, organist and choirmaster (d. 1614)

== Deaths ==
- 1540: Francesco De Layolle, Italian composer and organist (b. 1492)
- 1541:
  - Lupus Hellinck, Flemish composer (b. c. 1493/1494)
  - Hans Kotter, Organist and composer (b. 1480)
- 1542: Lodovico Fogliano, theorist and composer (c. 66)
- 1543: probable
  - Ludwig Senfl, Swiss composer (b. c. 1486)
  - Francesco Canova da Milano, composer and lutenist (b. 1497)
- Avery Burton, composer (c.73) died in England
- 1544:
  - Balthasar Resinarius, (b. c. 1483)
  - Benedictus Dulcis, (c. 52)
- 1545: April 10 – Constanzo Festa, Italian composer (b. c.1485–1490)
  - July 7 – William Crane, English composer, musician and merchant.
  - Pietro Aaron, Italian composer, theorist and priest (b. c. 1480)
  - Sebastian z Felsztyna, Polish composer and theorist (b. c. 1480–1490)
- 1546: October 18 – John Taverner, English composer (b. c. 1490)
- 1547: October or November – John Redford, English composer, poet and playwright (b. c. 1500)
- 1548: June 14 – Elzéar Genet de Carpentras, French composer (b. c. 1470)
  - January 23 – Bernardo Pisano, Italian composer and singer (b. 1490).
  - April 10 – Giacomo Fogliano, Italian composer, organist and teacher (b. c. 1468)
  - August 16 – Georg Rhau, printer, publisher and composer, died in Wittenberg (b. 1488)
  - October 21 – Sixt Dietrich, composer and teacher, died in St Gallen, Switzerland (c. 55)
  - Vincenzo Capirola, lutenist and composer, died in Brescia (b. 1474).
- 1549
  - Richard Pygott, English composer and choirmaster
  - Antonio Rotta, Italian lutenist and composer (b. c. 1495)
