= 1575 in music =

List of years in music	(table)
- … 1565; 1566; 1567; 1568; 1569; 1570; 1571; 1572; 1573; 1574; 1575; 1576; 1577; 1578; 1579; 1580; 1581; 1582; 1583; 1584; 1585 …
- Art; Archaeology; Architecture; Literature; Music; Philosophy; Science; +...

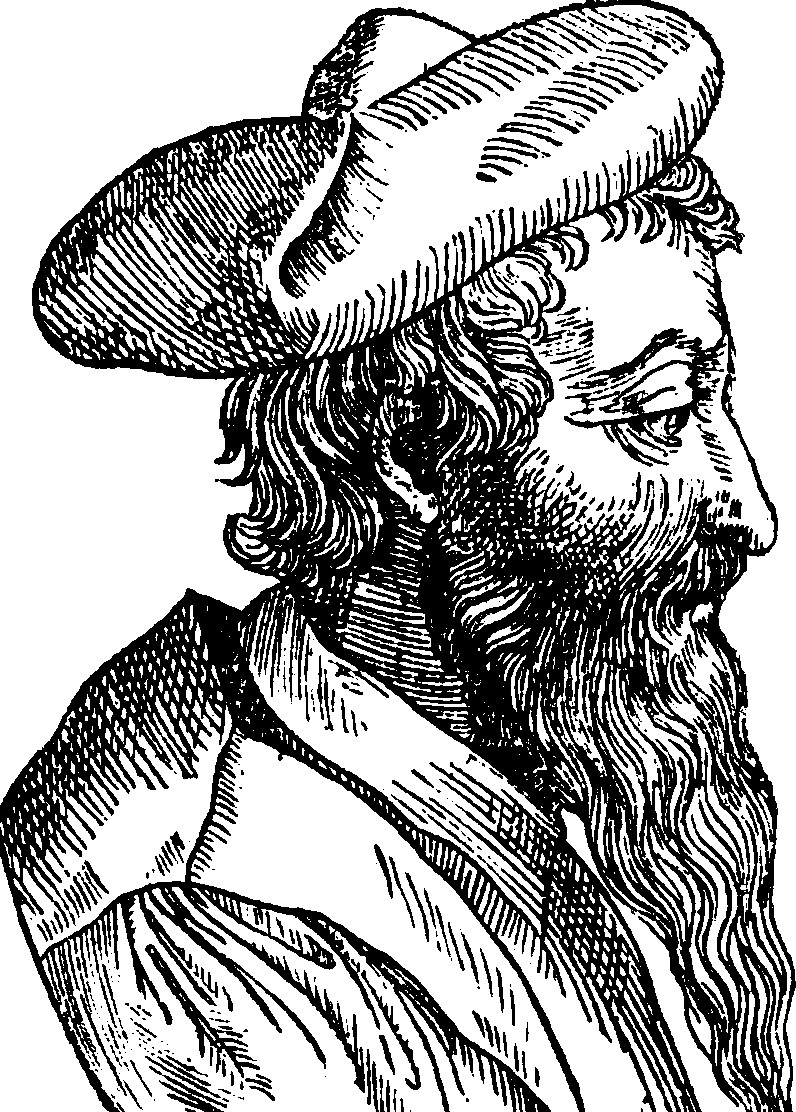
Retrato de Vicentino

== Events ==
- January 22 – Thomas Tallis and William Byrd are granted a 25-year monopoly for printing and selling part-music and manuscript paper by Queen Elizabeth I of England.
- The first performance of a mixed consort takes place in the court of Queen Elizabeth I of England.
- First appearance of the dulcian in Nuremberg.
- Tomás Luis de Victoria is ordained a priest.

== Publications ==
- Elias Nicolaus Ammerbach – Ein new künstlich Tabulaturbuch (Leipzig: Johann Beyer for Dietrich Gerlach), a book of 40 motet intabulations and one praeambulum by various composers.
- Costanzo Antegnati – First book of sacrae cantiones (motets) for five voices (Venice: sons of Antonio Gardano)
- Jean d'Arras publishes a chanson.
- Giammateo Asola – Falsi bordoni per cantar salmi for four voices (Venice: sons of Antonio Gardano)
- Vincenzo Bellavere – Second book of madrigals for five voices (Venice: heirs of Girolamo Scotto)
- Joachim a Burck – Zwantzig deutsche Liedlein for four voices (Erfurt: Georg Baumann)
- William Byrd & Thomas Tallis – Cantiones quae ab argumento sacrae vocantur
- Ippolito Chamaterò – Magnificats for 8, 9, and 12 voices (Venice: heirs of Girolamo Scotto)
- Giovanni Dragoni
  - First book of madrigals for five voices (Venice: heirs of Girolamo Scotto)
  - Second book of madrigals for five voices (Venice: heirs of Girolamo Scotto)
- Placido Falconio – Introitus et Alleluia per omnes festivitates totius anni for five voices (Venice: Antonio Gardano, sons), including the first appearance of basso seguente
- Giovanni Ferretti – Second book of canzoni alla napolitana for six voices (Venice: heirs of Girolamo Scotto)
- Andrea Gabrieli – First book of madrigals for three voices (Venice: Antonio Gardano, figliuoli)
- Jacobus de Kerle – Motets for five and six voices (Munich: Adam Berg), also includes hymns
- Orlande de Lassus
  - Patrocinium musices, Part 4 (Munich: Adam Berg), a collection of sacred music for four and five voices
  - Motets for three voices (Munich: Adam Berg)
- Philippe de Monte
  - Fourth book of motets for five voices (Venice: sons of Antonio Gardano)
  - Sixth book of madrigals for five voices (Venice: Angelo Gardano)
  - Sonetz de Pierre de Ronsard for five, six, and seven voices (Leuven: Pierre Phalèse & Antwerp: Jean Bellère)
- Giovanni Domenico da Nola – Motets for six voices
- Antonio Pace – First and second book of madrigals for six voices published in Venice by Giuseppe Guglielmo
- Giovanni Pierluigi da Palestrina – Motettorum liber tertius (Third Book of Motets)
- Giovanni Battista Pinello di Ghirardi – Fourth book of napolitane for three voices (Venice: heirs of Girolamo Scotto)
- Costanzo Porta – Litaniae Deiparae Virginis Mariae for eight voices (Venice: Giorgio Angelieri)
- Antonio Scandello – Newe schöne ausserlesene geistliche deudsche Lieder, published in Dresden.
- Il secondo libro de madrigali a cinque voci de floridi virtuosi del Serenissimo Ducca di Baviera, an anthology of music by court composers from Munich, is published.
- Kurtzer Ausszug der Christlichen und Catholischen Geseng, a defense of conservative music during the Reformation, is published.

== Births ==
- December 18 – Michelagnolo Galilei, lutenist and composer (d. 1631)
- date unknown
  - John Bennet, English composer (d. c. 1614).
  - Estêvão de Brito, Portuguese composer (d. 1641)
  - Christoph Strauss, cantor, organist and composer (d. 1631)
- probable
  - Vittoria Aleotti, Italian composer (d. c. 1620)
  - Alfonso Ferrabosco the younger, viol player and composer (d. 1628)
  - Ennemond Gaultier, French lutenist and composer (d. 1651)
  - Giovanni Priuli, composer (d. 1626)
  - Giovanni Maria Trabaci, composer (d. 1647)

== Deaths ==
- March 15 – Annibale Padovano, Venetian organist and composer (b. 1527)
- April 17 – Johann Bertram, German composer, kantor, and theologian
- July 14 – Richard Taverner, writer, translator, politician and composer of church music (b. 1505)
- August 16 – Francesco Adriani, Italian composer
- probable – Giacomo Gorzanis, Italian lutenist
- possible (alternatively 1576) – Nicola Vicentino, Italian music theorist and composer (b. 1511; possibly plague)
