= 1578 in music =

List of years in music	(table)
- … 1568; 1569; 1570; 1571; 1572; 1573; 1574; 1575; 1576; 1577; 1578; 1579; 1580; 1581; 1582; 1583; 1584; 1585; 1586; 1587; 1588 …
- Art; Archaeology; Architecture; Literature; Music; Philosophy; Science; +...

== Events ==
- Autumn – Pope Gregory XIII's plans for a corrected edition of the Graduale Romanum is abandoned due to lack of funds.
- Bernardino Bertolotti becomes a court musician of the Este family at Ferrara.

== Publications ==
- Costanzo Antegnati – First book of masses for six and eight voices (Venice: Angleo Gardano)
- Giammateo Asola – Vespertina omnium solemnitatum psalmodia (Venice: Angelo Gardano), also includes two Magnificats
- Lodovico Balbi – Ecclesiasticarum cantionum for four voices (Venice: Angelo Gardano)
- Paolo Bellasio – First book of madrigals for five voices (Venice: heirs of Girolamo Scotto)
- Antoine de Bertrand
  - First book of Les Amours de Pierre Ronsard for four voices (Paris: Le Roy & Ballard), a chanson cycle setting texts by Ronsard
  - Second book of Les Amours de Pierre Ronsard for three voices (Paris: Le Roy & Ballard)
  - Third book of chansons for four voices (Paris: Le Roy & Ballard)
- Joachim a Burck
  - Crepundia sacra for four voices (Mühlhausen: Georg Hantzsch), settings of hymns by Ludwig Helmbold
  - Sacrarum odarum, Ludovici Helmboldi Mulhusini (Sacred odes of Ludwig Helmbold of Mühlhausen), book two (Mühlhausen: Georg Hantzsch), a collection of hymn settings
- Antonio de Cabezón – Obras de música para tecla, arpa y vihuela (Madrid: Francisco Sanchez), a collection of instrumental arrangements of pieces by various composers, published posthumously by his son Hernando
- Fabrice Caietain – Second book of airs, chansons, villanelles, napolitaines & espagnolles for four voices (Paris: Le Roy & Ballard)
- Ludwig Daser – Patrocinium musices for four voices (Munich: Adam Berg), a setting of the Passion
- Johannes Eccard – Neue deutzsche Lieder (New German Songs) for four and five voices (Mühlhausen: Georg Hantzsch)
- George de la Hèle – 8 Masses for five, six, and seven voices (Antwerp: Christophe Plantin)
- Fernando de las Infantas
  - Sacrarum varii styli cantionum tituli Spiritus sancti, book one, for four voices (Venice: Angelo Gardano)
  - Sacrarum varii styli cantionum tituli Spiritus sancti, book two, for five voices (Venice: heirs of Girolamo Scotto)
- Giorgio Mainerio – Il primo libro de' balli for four voices (Venice: Angelo Gardano)
- Tiburtio Massaino
  - First book of masses for five and six voices (Venice: Angelo Gardano)
  - Second book of madrigals for five voices (Venice: heirs of Girolamo Scotto)
- Claudio Merulo
  - First book of motets for five voices (Venice: Angelo Gardano)
  - Second book of motets for five voices (Venice: Angelo Gardano)
- Philippe de Monte – Seventh book of madrigals for five voices (Venice: Angelo Gardano)
- Andreas Pevernage – Cantiones aliquot sacrae for six, seven, and eight voices (Douai: Jean Bogard)
- Costanzo Porta – First book of masses for four, five, and six voices (Venice: Angelo Gardano)

== Classical music ==
- Jan Trojan Turnovský – Missa super Jerusalem cito veniet

== Births ==
- December 2 – Agostino Agazzari, Sienese composer (d. 1640)

== Deaths ==
- probable – Francesco Portinaro, composer and humanist (b. c. 1520)
