= 1580 in music =

List of years in music	(table)
- … 1570; 1571; 1572; 1573; 1574; 1575; 1576; 1577; 1578; 1579; 1580; 1581; 1582; 1583; 1584; 1585; 1586; 1587; 1588; 1589; 1590 …
- Art; Archaeology; Architecture; Literature; Music; Philosophy; Science; +...

== Events ==
- Giovanni Pierluigi da Palestrina loses his wife in an outbreak of plague.

== Bands formed ==
- The Concerto delle donne is founded by Alfonso II, Duke of Ferrara.

== Popular music ==
- First recorded appearance of the English ballad Greensleeves.

== Publications ==
- Giammateo Asola – Second book of masses for four voices (Venice: Angelo Gardano), also includes a Requiem mass for two choirs
- Lodovico Balbi – Masses for four and five voices (Venice: Angelo Gardano)
- Anthoine de Bertrand
  - First book of sonets chrestiens mis en musique for four voices (Senlis: Simon Goulart; Lyon: Charles Pesnot)
  - Second book of sonets chrestiens mis en musique for four voices (Senlis: Simon Goulart; Lyon: Charles Pesnot)
- Joachim a Burck
  - Officium Sacrosanctae Coenae Dominicae, super cantiunculam: Quam mirabilis ex primo libro odarum compositum for four voices (Erfurt: Georg Baumann)
  - Hebdomas divinitus instituta for four voices (Mühlhausen: Georg Hantzsch)
- Girolamo Diruta – Il primo libro de contrapunti, sopra il canto fermo delle antifone delle feste principali de tutto l'anno for five voices (Venice: Angelo Gardano)
- Placido Falconio
  - Turbarum voces (Voices of the crowd) for four voices (Brescia: Vincenzo Sabbio), a collection of motets
  - Voces Christi (Voices of Christ) for three voices (Brescia: Vincenzo Sabbio), a collection of motets
  - Sacra Responsoria Hebdomadae Sanctae for four voices (Brescia: Vincenzo Sabbio), a collection of responsories for Holy Week
  - Threni Hieremiae prophetae, una cum psalmis, Benedictus et Miserere for four voices (Brescia: Vincenzo Sabbio), a setting of Lamentations
- Andrea Gabrieli – Second book of madrigals for six voices (Venice: Angelo Gardano)
- Jacobus Gallus
  - First book of masses for seven and eight voices (Prague: Georg Nigrinus)
  - First book of masses for six voices (Prague: Georg Nigrinus)
  - First book of masses for five voices (Prague: Georg Nigrinus)
  - First book of masses for four voice (Prague: Georg Nigrinus)
- Mikołaj Gomółka – Melodiae ná psałterz polski for four voices (Kraków: Lazarus), a Polish psalter
- Eucharius Hoffmann – Geistlicher Lieder in irer gewöhnlichen Melodey auff Villanellen art for four voices, part one (Rostock: Augustin Ferber)
- Marc'Antonio Ingegneri – Third book of madrigals for five voices (Venice: Angelo Gardano)
- Giorgio Mainerio – Sacra cantica Beatissimae Mariae Virginis omnitonum for six voices (Venice: Angelo Gardano), a collection of Magnificats
- Luca Marenzio – First book of madrigals for five voices (Venice: Angelo Gardano)
- Tiburtio Massaino – Second book of motets for five voices (Venice: Angelo Gardano)
- Claudio Merulo – First book of madrigals for three voices (Venice: Angelo Gardano)
- Philippe de Monte
  - Fourth book of madrigals for six voices (Venice: Angelo Gardano)
  - Eighth book of madrigals for five voices (Venice: heirs of Girolamo Scotto)
  - Ninth book of madrigals for five voices (Venice: hiers of Girolamo Scotto)
- Leonhard Päminger – Quartus tomus cantionem ecclestiacarum..., published posthumously in Nuremberg
- Costanzo Porta – Liber quinquaginta duorum motectorum (Book of Fifty-two Motets) for four, five, six, seven, and eight voices (Venice: Angelo Gardano)
- Johann Wanning – Sacrae Cantiones quinque, sex, septem et octo voces compositae, et tum vivae voces, tum musicis instrumentis aptatae (first part of first cycle of sacred de tempore motets)

== Births ==
- July 6 – Johann Stobäus, German composer (d. 1646)
- date unknown – Giovanni Girolamo Kapsperger, German-Italian performer and composer of lute, theorbo and chitarrone music (d. 1651)
- probable
  - Michael East, English organist and composer (d. 1648)
  - Thomas Ford, English composer (d. 1648)
  - Adriana Basile, Italian composer (d. 1640)

== Deaths ==
- January 18 – Antonio Scandello, Italian composer (b. 1517)
- April 1 – Alonso Mudarra, Spanish composer and vihuelist (b. c.1510)
- September 15 – Geert van Turnhout, Flemish composer (b. c.1530)
- November 30 – Richard Farrant, English composer of church music, choirmaster, playwright and theatrical producer (b. c.1530)
