= 1587 in music =

List of years in music	(table)
- … 1577; 1578; 1579; 1580; 1581; 1582; 1583; 1584; 1585; 1586; 1587; 1588; 1589; 1590; 1591; 1592; 1593; 1594; 1595; 1596; 1597 …
- Art; Archaeology; Architecture; Literature; Music; Philosophy; Science; +...

== Events ==
- January 31 – Pedro Bermúdez is dismissed from the position of maestro de capilla of the collegiate church at Antequera and briefly imprisoned, for gross negligence and a fight with one of his tenors.
- November 15 – Tobias Kühn is appointed to a musical post as a singer but also as a lutenist at the court in Wolfenbüttel.

== Publications ==
- Felice Anerio – First book of madrigals for five voices (Venice: Giacomo Vincenti)
- Giammateo Asola
  - Nova vespertina omnium solemnitatum psalmodia for eight voices (Venice: Ricciardo Amadino), also includes a Magnificat
  - Le Vergini for three voices, book 2 (Venice: Giacomo Vincenti), a madrigal cycle, setting Petrarch's Vergine bella
  - Madrigals for two voices (Venice: Giacomo Vincenti)
- Ippolito Baccusi – Fourth book of madrigals for six voices (Venice: Angelo Gardano)
- Ludovico Balbi – Ecclesiasticarum cantionum in sacris totius anni Sanctorum sollemnitatibus for four voices (Venice: Angelo Gardano)
- Giovanni Bassano – Canzonettas for four voices (Venice: Giacomo Vincenti)
- Johannes Eccard – Epithalamion nuptiis (Sponsa decora veni) for five voices (Königsberg: Georg Osterberger), a wedding song
- Alfonso Ferrabosco the elder
  - First book of madrigals for five voices (Venice: Angelo Gardano)
  - Second book of madrigals for five voices (Venice: Angelo Gardano)
- Andrea Gabrieli & Giovanni Gabrieli – Concerti (Venice: Angelo Gardano), the majority of the pieces are by Andrea, published posthumously
- Vincenzo Galilei – Second book of madrigals for four and five voices (Venice: Angelo Gardano)
- Jacobus Gallus – Opus musicum, volumes 2 & 3 (Prague: Georg Nigrinus)
- Marc'Antonio Ingegneri
  - Second book of masses for five voices (Venice: Ricciardo Amadino)
  - Fifth book of madrigals for five voices (Venice: Angelo Gardano)
- Orlande de Lassus – Madrigals for four, five, and six voices (Nuremberg: Catharina Gerlach), his seventh and final book of only madrigals
- Carolus Luython – Popularis anni jubilus for six voices (Prague: Georg Nigrinus), a collection of motets
- Giovanni de Macque – Second book of madrigals for five voices (Venice: Giacomo Vincenti)
- Luca Marenzio
  - Fourth book of madrigals for six voices (Venice: Giacomo Vincenti)
  - Fourth book of villanelle for three voices (Venice: Giacomo Vincenti)
  - Fifth book of villanelle for three voices (Venice: heirs of Girolamo Scotto)
- Tiburtio Massaino
  - Psalmi omnes ad vesperas per totum annum for four voices (Venice: Angelo Gardano)
  - Second book of masses for five voices (Venice: Angelo Gardano)
  - Third book of madrigals for five voices (Venice: Angelo Gardano)
- Rinaldo del Mel – Third book of madrigals for five voices (Venice: Angelo Gardano)
- Philippe de Monte
  - First book of masses (Antwerp: Christophe Plantin)
  - Second book of motets for six voices (Venice: Angelo Gardano)
  - Twelfth book of madrigals for five voices (Venice: Angelo Gardano)
- Claudio Monteverdi – Madrigali a cinque voci di Claudio Monteverde Cremonese discepolo del Sig.r Marc'Antonio Ingegnieri... Libro primo (Venice: Angelo Gardano), a book of madrigals
- Jakob Paix – Parodia mottetae Domine da nobis auxilium, Thomae Crequilonis, senis vocibus, ad Dorium (Lauingen, Leonhard Reinmichel)
- Giovanni Pierluigi da Palestrina – Second book of motets for four voices
- Benedetto Pallavicino – First book of madrigals for six voices (Venice: Giacomo Vincenti)

== Compositions ==
- Adam Puschmann, Wachtelweise, a Meisterton, collected in his manuscript Singebuch (1588)

== Births ==
- February 26 (baptized) – Stefano Landi, Roman composer and teacher (died 1639)
- September 18 – Francesca Caccini, Florentine composer and lutenist (died after 1641)
- November 3 (baptized) – Samuel Scheidt, German composer (died 1654)
- date unknown – Francesco Lambardi, Neapolitan composer (died 1642)

== Deaths ==
- February 9 – Vincenzo Ruffo, Veronese composer (born 1508)
- June 15 – Giovanni Battista Pinello di Ghirardi, Italian composer and singer (born c.1544)
- August 29 – Vincenzo Bellavere, Venetian composer (born c.1540/1541)
