= 1572 in music =

List of years in music	(table)
- … 1562; 1563; 1564; 1565; 1566; 1567; 1568; 1569; 1570; 1571; 1572; 1573; 1574; 1575; 1576; 1577; 1578; 1579; 1580; 1581; 1582 …
- Art; Archaeology; Architecture; Literature; Music; Philosophy; Science; +...

== Events ==
- 20 February – John of Austria, through the agency of Girolamo Dalla Casa in Venice, purchases a large number of wind instruments and printed editions of music for his court, paying the considerable sum of 154 scudi, 3 lire, and 20 soldi in gold.
- William Byrd becomes a Gentleman of the Chapel Royal.

== Publications ==
- Lodovico Agostini
  - Enigmi musicali... il primo libro a sei... (Venice: Antonio Gardano and sons)
  - Second book of madrigals for four voices (Venice: Antonio Gardano and sons)
  - First book of canons and echo for six voices (Venice: Antonio Gardano and sons)
- Ippolito Baccusi
  - Second book of madrigals for five voices (Venice: Girolamo Scotto)
  - Second book of madrigals for six voices (Venice: Girolamo Scotto)
- Joachim a Burck
  - First book of sacrae odae for four voices (Erfurt: Georg Baumann), settings of hymns by Ludwig Helmbold
  - A Birthday song for the firstborn son of William IV, Landgrave of Hesse-Kassel for five voices (Mühlhausen: Georg Hantzsch)
- Girolamo Conversi – First book of canzoni alla Napolitana for five voices (Venice: Girolamo Scotto)
- Andrea Gabrieli – First book of masses for six voices (Venice: Antonio Gardano and sons)
- Marc'Antonio Ingegneri – Second book of madrigals for five voices (Venice: Antonio Gardano, figliuoli)
- Paolo Isnardi – Lamentations for five voices (Venice: Antonio Gardano, figliuoli)
- Jacobus de Kerle
  - Liber modulorum for four, five, and six voices (Paris: Le Roy & Ballard)
  - Liber modulorum sacrorum for five and six voices (Munich: Adam Berg)
- Orlande de Lassus
  - Moduli for four and eight voices (Paris: Le Roy & Ballard)
  - Der ander Theil teutscher Lieder for five voices (Munich: Adam Berg)
- Paulus Melissus – Di Psalmen Davids for four voices (Heidelberg: Michael Schirat), a German translation of Clément Marot and Théodore de Bèze's French psalms
- Philippe de Monte – First book of motets for five voices (Venice: Girolamo Scotto)
- Giovanni Pierluigi da Palestrina – Motettorum Liber Secundus (Second Book of Motets) for five, six, and eight voices
- Giovanni Battista Pinello di Ghirardi – Third book of canzoni napolitane for three voices (Venice: Girolamo Scotto)
- Francesco Portinaro – Third book of motets for five, six, seven, and eight voices (Venice: sons of Antonio Gardano)
- Johann Rasch published in Munich:
  - Cantiunculae Paschales (Little Easter Songs)
  - Cantiones Ecclesiast. de Nativ. Christi, 4 voc.
  - In Monte Olivarum
  - Salve Regina, 6 voc.
- Giulio Zacchini – Motetta a 4 vocum

== Births ==
- February 14 – Hans Christoph Haiden, German composer, organist and poet
- March 16 (baptized) – Daniel Bacheler, English lutenist and composer (d. c. 1619).
- May 25 – Maurice, Landgrave of Hesse-Kassel (or Hesse-Cassel), German music patron and composer (d. 1632).
- September 15 (baptized) – Erasmus Widmann, German composer, teacher, instrumentalist, organist, and poet (d. 1634)
- October 19 (baptized) – Paolo Fonghetto, Italian composer
- December 27 – Johannes Vodnianus Campanus, Czech composer, pedagogue and humanist (d. 1622)
- date unknown
  - Martin Peerson, English composer, organist and virginalist (d. 1650 or 1651).
  - Thomas Tomkins, Welsh composer (d. 1656)
  - Alessandro Ghivizzani, Italian composer

== Deaths ==
- January – Robert Parsons, composer (b. c. 1535; drowned)
- February 23 – Pierre Certon, French composer (b. c. 1510)
- August 28? – Claude Goudimel, French composer, murdered in the St. Bartholomew's Day Massacre. (b. c. 1514)
- date unknown
  - Melchior Kreisstein, German music printer
  - Francesco Londariti (Frankiskos Leontaritis), Cretan composer, active in Venice and Munich
  - Christopher Tye, English composer (b. c. 1571-1573)
