= 1564 in music =

== Events ==
- Claude Le Jeune comes to Paris and begins to associate with Huguenots.
- Richard Farrant is appointed master of the children of St. George's Chapel, Windsor.

== Publications ==
- Paolo Aretino – First and second books of responsories for Holy Week (Venice: Francesco Rampazetto)
- Bálint Bakfark – First book of lute tablature (Paris: Le Roy & Ballard), contains "several fantasies, motets, chansons, and madrigals" by various composers
- Simon Boyleau – Madrigals for four, five, six, seven, and eight voices (Milan: Francesco Moscheni)
- Gioseppe Caimo – First book of madrigals for four voices (Milan: Francesco Moscheni)
- Claude Goudimel – Les cent cinquante pseaumes de David nouvellement mis en musique for four voices (Paris: Le Roy & Ballard), homophonic harmonizations of the melodies from the 1551 edition of the Genevan Psalter
- Philibert Jambe de Fer – Les 150 Psaumes de David à 4 et 5 voix (Lyon: Antoine de Cercia & Pierre de Mia)
- Orlande de Lassus
  - First book of motets for five and six voices (Paris: Le Roy & Ballard)
  - Fourth book of chansons for four and five voices (Louvain: Pierre Phalèse)
- Claude Le Jeune – 10 pseaumes de David for four voices (Paris: Le Roy & Ballard)
- Francisco Leontaritis – First book of motets for six voices (Venice: Francesco Rampazetto)
- Giovanni Domenico da Nola – Second book of madrigals for five voices (Rome: Valerio Salviano & fratelli)
- Johannes Pacoloni – Tribus testudinibus ludenda carmina
- Annibale Padovano – First book of madrigals for five voices (Venice: Antonio Gardano)
- Gioan Paien – First book of madrigals for two voices (Venice: Antonio Gardano)
- Giovanni Pierluigi da Palestrina — First book of Motets for four voices (Venice: Antonio Gardano)

== Classical music ==
- Philibert Jambe de Fer – Music for the arrival of King Charles IX of France

== Births ==
- October 26 – Hans Leo Hassler, German composer (d. 1612)
- date unknown – Kryštof Harant, nobleman, traveller, humanist, soldier, writer and composer (d. 1621)

== Deaths ==
- October 5 – Pierre de Manchicourt, composer of the Franco-Flemish School (b. c. 1510)
- date unknown
  - Jacques Brunel, organist and composer
  - Purandara Dasa, composer of Carnatic music (b. 1484)
