= 1604 in music =

The year 1604 in music involved some significant events.

== Events ==
- Robert Johnson becomes a royal lutenist in King James I of England's "Private Musick".

== Publications ==
- Gregor Aichinger – Lacrimae D. Virginis et Ioannis in Christum à cruce depositum... (Augsburg: Johannes Praetorius)
- Adriano Banchieri – Il Zabaione musicale inventione boscareccia, first book of madrigals for five voices (Milan: Simon Tini & Filippo Lomazzo)
- Thomas Bateson – The first set of English Madrigales: to 3. 4. 5. and 6. voices
- Lodovico Bellanda – Sacrae cantiones for three, four, and five voices (Venice: Ricciardo Amadino)
- Joachim a Burck – Ein schön geistlich Lied, genommen aus dem 19. Capitel des Buchs Jobs, von der Aufferstehung Jesu Christi (A beautiful sacred song, taken from the 19th chapter of the book of Job, of the resurrection of Jesus Christ) for four voices (Erfurt: Johann Beck)
- Christoph Demantius – Nuptiis Dn. Iohannis Salvelderi cum matrona Anna Hornia for six voices (Dresden: Johann Bergen), an epithalamium
- John Dowland – Lachrimae, or Seaven Teares figured in seaven passionate pavans, with divers other pavans, galliards and allemands, set forth for the lute, viols or violins, in five parts (London: John Windet)
- Johannes Eccard – Liedlein (Gar offt thut mancher klagen) for five voices (Königsberg: Georg Neykken), an epithalamium
- Christian Erbach
  - Modorum sacrorum sive cantionum, liber secundus for four, five, six, seven, eight, and more voices (Augsburg: Johann Praetorius)
  - Modorum sacrorum tripertitorum, part 1, for five voices (Dillingen: Adam Meltzer), a collection of introits, alleluias and post-communion songs for holy days from Pentecost to Christmas
- Alfonso Fontanelli – Second book of madrigals for five voices (Venice: Angelo Gardano), published anonymously
- Melchior Franck
  - Second book of sacrae melodiae for four, five, six, seven, eight, nine, ten, eleven, and twelve voices (Nuremberg: Konrad Baur)
  - Third book of sacrae melodiae for three and four voices (Coburg: Justus Hauck)
  - Deutsche Weltliche Gesäng und Täntze (German Secular Songs and Dances) for four, five, six, and eight voices (Coburg: Justus Hauck)
- Marco da Gagliano – Second book of madrigals for five voices (Venice: Angelo Gardano)
- Ruggiero Giovannelli – Second book of motets for five voices (Venice: Angelo Gardano)
- Thomas Greaves – Songs of Sundrie kinds ... Madrigalles, for five voyces
- Cesario Gussago – First book of sacrae cantiones for eight voices (Venice: Ricciardo Amadino)
- Konrad Hagius – Neue Deutsche Tricinien for three voices or instruments (Frankfurt: Wolfgang Richter for Johann Spiess)
- Giovanni Girolamo Kapsberger – Libro primo d'intavolatura di chitarrone (Venice)
- Carolus Luython – Lamentations for six voices (Prague: Georg Nigrinus)
- Luzzasco Luzzaschi – Seventh book of madrigals for five voices (Venice: Giacomo Vincenti)
- Tiburtio Massaino
  - First book of madrigals for six voices (Venice: Angelo Gardano)
  - Second book of madrigals for six voices (Venice: Giacomo Vincenti)
- Ascanio Mayone – First book of madrigals for five voices (Naples: Giovanni Battista Sottile)
- Claudio Merulo
  - Second book of madrigals for five voices (Venice: Angelo Gardano)
  - Second book of Toccate d'Intavolatura d'Organo (Rome: Simone Verovio)
- Simone Molinaro – First book of motets for five voices (Milan: Agostino Tradate)
- Annibale Padovano – Toccate et ricercari d'organo (Venice: Angelo Gardano), published posthumously
- Benedetto Pallavicino – Seventh book of madrigals for five voices (Venice: Ricciardo Amadino), published posthumously
- Enrico Antonio Radesca - First book of masses for four voices (Milan: Simon Tini & Filippo Lomazzo)
- Orfeo Vecchi – Scielta de madrigali (A collection of madrigals) for five voices (Milan: heirs of Simon Tini & Francesco Lomazzo), a collection of sacred contrafacts of madrigals by other composers, published posthumously

== Births ==
- July 8 – Heinrich Albert, German composer and poet (died 1651)
- November 15 – Davis Mell, English violinist (died 1662)
- November 26 – Johannes Bach, member of the Bach musical dynasty (died 1673)
- date unknown – Francesco Foggia, composer (died 1688)

== Deaths ==
- January 17 – Santino Garsi da Parma, lutenist and composer (born 1542)
- February – Emmanuel Adriaenssen, Dutch lutenist and music theorist (born c. 1554)
- May 4 – Claudio Merulo, Italian organist and composer (born 1533)
- August 30 – Giovenale Ancina, Italian priest, scholar and composer (born 1545)
- date unknown
  - Ludovico Balbi, Venetian singer and composer
  - Sebastian Raval, Spanish composer (born c. 1550)
