= 1591 in music =

== Events ==
- Alonso Lobo, Spanish composer, is appointed maestro de capilla by Seville Cathedral.
- Ruggiero Giovannelli, Italian composer and successor to Giovanni Pierluigi da Palestrina at St. Peter's, acquires post at Collegio Germanico in Rome.
- Giulio Belli, Italian composer, is appointed maestro di cappella at cathedral in Carpi, Italy.
- Giovanni Bernardino Nanino, Italian composer of the Roman School, is appointed maestro di cappella at S Luigi dei Francesi in Rome.
- John Bull becomes organist for Elizabeth I at the Chapel Royal.
- Emilio de' Cavalieri serves as a papal spy, engaging in several secret vote-buying missions to Florence.

== Publications ==
- Giammateo Asola
  - Second book of masses for five voices (Venice: Ricciardo Amadino)
  - 3 Masses for six voices (Venice: Ricciardo Amadino)
- John Baldwin completes My Ladye Nevells Booke, a manuscript anthology of keyboard music by William Byrd
- Paolo Bellasio – Madrigals for three, four, five, six, seven, and eight voices (Venice: Ricciardo Amadino)
- William Byrd, Catholic composer in England, publishes his Cantiones sacrae, Book 2, for five and six voices (London: Thomas East for William Byrd)
- Giovanni Croce – Compietta for eight voices (Venice: Giacomo Vincenti), music for Compline, his first publication
- Scipione Dentice – First book of madrigals for five voices (Naples: Matteo Cancer)
- John Farmer – Divers and sundrie waies of two parts in one (London: Thomas East), a collection of vocal canons
- Stefano Felis
  - Third book of motets for five voices (Venice: Girolamo Scotto)
  - Sixth book of madrigals for five voices (Venice: Scipione Rizzo for Girolamo Scotto)
- Giovanni Giacomo Gastoldi – Balletti a5, published in Venice
- Gioseffo Guami – Fourth book of madrigals for five and six voices (Venice: Angelo Gardano)
- Adam Gumpelzhaimer
  - Compendium musicae (Augsburg: Valentin Schönigk), a music theory textbook in Latin and German
  - Neue Teutsche Geistliche Lieder for three voices (Augsburg: Valentin Schönigk)
- Hans Leo Hassler – Cantiones sacrae de festis praecipuis totius anni for four, five, six, seven, eight, and more voices (Augsburg: Valentin Schönigk), a large collection of motets
- Marc'Antonio Ingegneri – First book of motets for six voices (Venice: Angelo Gardano)
- Luca Marenzio – Fifth book of madrigals for six voices (Venice: Angelo Gardano)
- Philippe de Monte – Sixth book of madrigals for six voices (Venice: Angelo Gardano)
- Johannes Nucius – Modulationes sacrae modis musicis for five and six voices (Prague: Georg Nigrinus)
- Pietro Paolo Paciotto has his first book of masses published in Venice by Alessandro Gardano
- Giovanni Pierluigi da Palestrina, Italian composer, publishes a group of Magnificat settings, in Rome
- Andreas Pevernage – Fourth book of chansons for five voices (Antwerp: widow of Plantin & Jean Mourentorf)
- Giaches de Wert, Franco-Flemish composer, publishes his tenth book of madrigals

== Births ==
- October 6 – Settimia Caccini, Italian composer and singer, younger daughter of Giulio Caccini and sister of Francesca Caccini (died 1638)
- date unknown
  - Joseph Solomon Delmedigo, Cretan music theorist, in Candia (Iraklion) (died 1655)
  - Robert Dowland, lutenist and composer (died 1641)

== Deaths ==
- January 7 – Jacobus de Kerle, Netherlandish composer
- February 10 – Ambrose Lupo, court musician and composer to Tudor monarchs (date of birth unknown)
- May 23 – John Blitheman, organist and composer (born 1525)
- July 2 – Vincenzo Galilei, Italian composer, lutenist and music theorist, father of Galileo (born 1520)
- July 18 – Jacobus Gallus (Jakob Handl), German-Austrian composer (born 1550)
- July 30 – Andreas Pevernage, Flemish composer (born 1542/43)
- date unknown
  - Joan Brudieu, composer (born 1520)
  - William Mundy, composer of sacred music (born 1529)
