= Passio (disambiguation) =

Passio or Passio Domini Nostri is the Latin for a passion oratorio.

Passio may also refer to:

- Passio (Pärt), a passion cantata by Arvo Pärt
- Passio, Luis de Pablo (1930–2021)
- Passio Christi, Johann Balthasar Christian Freisslich (1687–1764)
- Passio Jesu Christi, Johann Friedrich Fasch (1688–1758)
- Passio Caeciliae, by Marco Frisina (born 1954)
- Passio, Krzysztof Penderecki
- Passio, Sergio Rendine
- Passio, Carlo Sturla

== See also ==
- Passion (disambiguation)
