= 1584 in music =

== Publications ==
- Emmanuel Adriaenssen – Pratum musicum, a collection of lute music for solo and ensemble, published in Antwerp
- Giammateo Asola
  - Secundum pars continens officium hebdomadae sanctae... (Venice: Angelo Gardano)
  - Sacrae cantiones in totius anni solennitatibus... (Venice: Giacomo Vincenti & Ricciardo Amadino)
- Girolamo Belli – I furti amorosi (The Loving Thefts), second book of madrigals for six voices (Venice: Angelo Gardano), contains compositions based on quotes from famous madrigals
- Giulio Belli – Canzonettas for four voices (Venice: Angelo Gardano)
- Giuseppe Caimo – Second book of canzonette for four voices (Milan: Pietro Tini)
- Girolamo Conversi – First book of madrigals for six voices (Venice: heirs of Girolamo Scotto)
- Camillo Cortellini – Second book of madrigals for five voices (Bologna: Giovanni Rossi)
- Girolamo Dalla Casa – Il vero modo di diminuir con tutte le sorti di stromenti di fiato, & corda, & di voce humana, 2 vols. (Venice: Angelo Gardano)
- Giovanni Dragoni – First book of madrigals for six voices (Venice: heirs of Girolamo Scotto)
- Vincenzo Galilei
  - Fronimo Dialogo, revised edition (Venice: heirs of Girolamo Scotto)
  - Contrapunti for two voices or instruments (Florence: Giorgio Marescotti)
- Francisco Guerrero – Vespers (Rome: Domenico Basa)
- Marc'Antonio Ingegneri – Fourth book of madrigals for five voices (Venice: Angelo Gardano)
- Paolo Isnardi – Lamentations and Benedictus for four voices (Venice: heirs of Girolamo Scotto)
- Orlande de Lassus
  - Psalmi Davidis poenitentiales for five voices (Munich: Adam Berg), a setting of the penitential psalms
  - Continuation du mellange for three, four, five, six, and ten voices (Paris: Le Roy & Ballard), a collection of chansons and madrigals
- Cristofano Malvezzi – First book of madrigals for six voices (Venice: heirs of Girolamo Scotto)
- Luca Marenzio
  - Second book of madrigals for six voices (Venice: Angelo Gardano)
  - First book of madrigali spirituali for five voices (Rome: Alessandro Gardano)
  - Fourth book of madrigals for five voices (Venice: Giacomo Vincenti & Ricciardo Amadino)
  - First book of villanelle for three voices (Venice: Giacomo Vincenti & Ricciardo Amadino)
- Rinaldo del Mel
  - First book of madrigals for six voices (Venice: Angelo Gardano)
  - First book of madrigals for five voices (Venice: heirs of Girolamo Scotto)
- Claudio Merulo – First book of motets for four voices (Venice: Angelo Gardano)
- Philippe de Monte – Fifth book of madrigals for six voices (Venice: Angelo Gardano)
- Claudio Monteverdi – First book of canzonettas for three voices (Venice: Giacomo Vincenti & Ricciardo Amadino)
- Jakob Paix – Missa ad imitationem mottetae in illo tempore Joan Moutonis for four voices (Lauingen, Leonhard Reinmichel)
- Giovanni Pierluigi da Palestrina – Fifth book of motets for five voices (Rome: Alessandro Gardano)
- Benedetto Pallavicino – Second book of madrigals for five voices (Venice: Angelo Gardano)
- Giovanni Battista Pinello di Ghirardi
  - Cantiones for five, eight, ten, and more voices (Dresden: Matthäus Stöckel)
  - Nawe Kurtzweilige Deutsche Lieder (New Entertaining German Songs) for five voices (Dresden: Matthäus Stöckel)

== Classical music ==
- Paschal de l'Estocart – Ecce quam bonum et quam jucundum

== Births ==
- May 27 – Michael Altenburg, German baroque composer (died 1640)
- date unknown
  - Francisco Correa de Arauxo, Spanish organist, composer, and theorist (died 1654)
  - Andreas Berger, German composer (died 1656)
  - Daniel Friderici, German cantor, conductor, and composer (died 1638)

== Deaths ==
- September/October – Gioseppe Caimo, Italian organist and composer (born 1545)
- date unknown
  - Paolo Aretino, Venetian sacred music composer and choirmaster (born 1508)
  - Pietro Vinci, composer (born 1535)
- probable
  - Lucrezia Bendidio, Italian singer and noblewoman (born 1547)
  - Marcin Leopolita, Polish composer (born c.1540)
