= 1570 in music =

== Events ==
- 5 July – Annibale Zoilo joins the Sistine Chapel Choir in Rome as an alto.
- Luzzasco Luzzaschi becomes master of Duke Alfonso of Ferrara's private musica da camera, which was soon to become one of the most distinguished in Europe
- Orlande de Lassus is made a nobleman by Emperor Maximilian II, and knighted by Pope Gregory XIII
- Formation in Paris of Antoine de Baïf's Académie de Poésie et Musique, and consequent development of musique mesurée by composers such as Claude Le Jeune and Guillaume Costeley
- First appearance of the air de cour, a ubiquitous type of popular secular music in France until around 1650
- Lázaro del Álamo leaves his post as maestro di capilla in Mexico City
- Approximate date of the "Son de la Má Teodora", the earliest surviving example of son montuno from Cuba

== Publications ==
- Lodovico Agostini – First book of madrigals for five voices (Venice: Antonio Gardano and sons)
- Giovanni Animuccia – Second book of laudi (Rome: Camerali for Antonio Blado)
- Giammateo Asola – First book of masses for five voices (Venice: Antonio Gardano and sons)
- Ippolito Baccusi
  - First book of masses, for five and six voices (Venice: Girolamo Scotto)
  - First book of madrigals for five and six voices (Venice: Antonio Gardano and sons)
- Lodovico Balbi – First book of madrigals for four voices (Venice: Antonio Gardano and sons)
- Vincenzo Bellavere – First book of Giustiniane
- Maddalena Casulana – Second book of madrigals for four voices (Venice: Girolamo Scotto), the second printed collection of music by a woman in European history
- Pierre Certon – Les meslanges (Paris: Nicolas Du Chemin), a collection of sacred songs for five, six, seven, and eight voices with one for nine and one for thirteen
- Francesco Corteccia – Responsories for four voices (Venice: the sons of Antonio Gardano)
- Guillaume Costeley – Musique de Guillaume Costeley (Paris: Le Roy & Ballard), a collection of French chansons for five voices
- Nicolao Dorati – Le Stanze della Signora Vittoria Colonna Marchesana di Pescara Illustrissima for four voices (Venice: Girolamo Scotto), containing settings of poems by Vittoria Colonna
- Giovanni Ferretti – Third book of canzoni alla napolitana for five voices (Venice: Girolamo Scotto)
- Andrea Gabrieli – Second book of madrigals for five voices (Venice: Antonio Gardano, figliuoli), also includes two for six voices and a dialogue for eight voices
- Francisco Guerrero – Motets for four, five, six, and eight voices (Venice: Antonio Gardano, figliuoli)
- Marc'Antonio Ingegneri – First book of madrigals for four voices (Venice)
- Nicolas de La Grotte – Chansons de P. de Ronsard, Ph. Desportes, et autres (Paris: Le Roy & Ballard)
- Orlande de Lassus
  - 5 Masses suavissimis modulationibus refertae (filled with sweet melodies) for four and five voices, book 2 (Venice: Claudio Correggio)
  - Selectiorum aliquot cantionum sacrarum for six voices (Munich: Adam Berg)
- Mattheus Le Maistre – First book of motets for five voices (Dresden: Gimel Bergen)
- Philippe de Monte – Third book of madrigals for five voices (Venice: Girolamo Scotto)
- Giovanni Pierluigi da Palestrina – Third book of masses, for four to six voices (Rome: heirs of Valerio & Luigi Dorico)

== Classical music ==
- Geert van Turnhout – Missa ‘O Maria vernans rosa’ a 5
- Approximate date – Thomas Tallis – Spem in alium

== Births ==
- June 13 (baptized) – Paul Peuerl, German composer and organist (d. c. after 1625).
- June 18 (baptized) – Juan Pujol, Catalan composer (d. 1626)
- August 19 – Salamone Rossi, Italian composer (d. 1630)
- October 21 – Wolfgang Schonsleder, German composer and music theorist
- probable
  - Giovanni Paolo Cima, Italian composer (d. 1622)
  - John Cooper (Coprario), English composer (d. 1626)
  - Ignazio Donati, Italian composer (d. 1638)
  - John Farmer, English madrigal composer (d. 1605)
  - Claudia Sessa, Italian composer (d. c. 1617-19)

== Deaths ==
- January – Pierre Clereau, composer and choirmaster
- March 25 – Johann Walter, German composer (b. 1496)
- September – Jean de Bonmarché, composer (b. c. 1525)
- date unknown – Tomás de Santa María, Spanish music theorist, organist and composer (b. c. 1510).
- probable
  - Jean Maillard, French composer (approximate date) (b. c. 1515)
  - Diego Ortiz, Spanish music theorist and composer (approximate date) (b. c. 1510)
