= Vincenzo Fontana =

Vincenzo Fontana may refer to:

- Vincenzo Fontana (composer) (fl. 1550), Italian composer mainly known for his canzoni villanesche
- Vincenzo Fontana (politician) (born 1952), Italian politician and deputy for Agrigento
