= Perissone Cambio =

Italian composer

Perissone Cambio (c.1520 – c.1562) was a Franco-Flemish composer and singer of the Renaissance, active in Venice. He was one of the most prominent students and colleagues of Adrian Willaert during the formative years of the Venetian School, and published several books of madrigals in the 1540s.

== Life ==
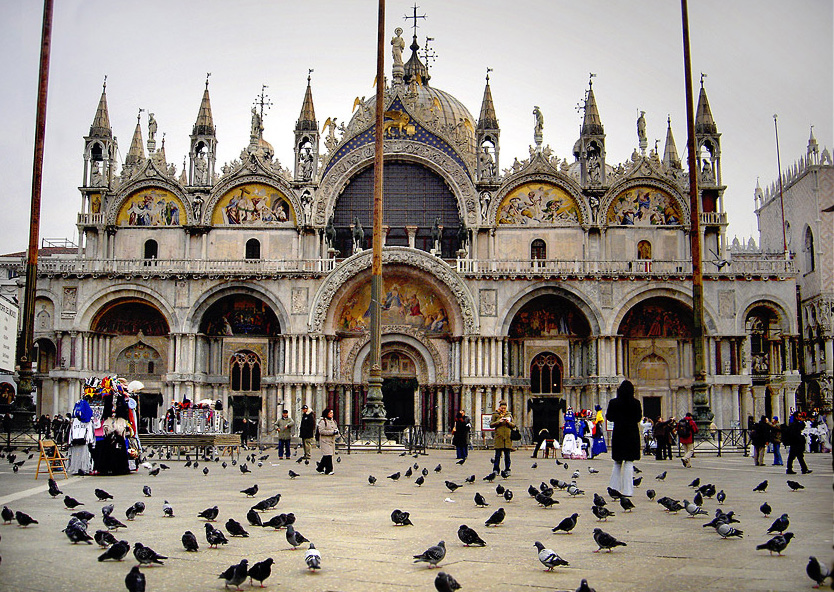
Perissone was one of the singers at San Marco di Venezia in the 1540s and 1550s, in the early years of the Venetian School.

Nothing is known about his early life except that he was either from Flanders or the immediately adjacent French-speaking areas. Two competing mentions of his origin exist in the historical record, one naming him as French and one as Flemish, with the Flemish mention coming from the Venetian Senate; the latter is considered more reliable. By the early 1540s he had come from his homeland to Venice, probably to study with Willaert, who was renowned as a teacher. This was near the end of the period during which musicians who received their early training in the Netherlands and adjacent areas left their homelands, going to Italy and other locations where demand for composers and singers was greatest. Perissone became one of Willaert's students, and part of a close group which included Girolamo Parabosco, Baldassare Donato, Jacques Buus, Jacques Du Pont, and Cipriano de Rore; in addition he acquired a reputation as an excellent singer, most likely of high vocal parts.

During the late 1540s he was the most prolific composer of the group around Willaert, publishing a total of four separate collections of secular music. In 1548 he finally became a member of the chapel of San Marco di Venezia, on an unpaid basis, which was an extraordinary event; presumably this occurred because his singing was highly desired, but there were no formal job openings. The doge of Venice, Francesco Donà, intervened on his behalf and made him a paid member of the chapel shortly thereafter.

While Perissone's last solo publication was in 1550, he continued as a singer at San Marco and presumably a composer throughout the decade. He also sang in the Compagnia di San Marco, a group of musicians associated with San Marco who performed in other locations in Venice. In 1557 he joined the brotherhood of the Scuola di San Marco. Nothing specific is known about his further career, and he is believed to have died around 1562; after his death, poet Domenico Veniero wrote a sonnet indicating that he had died young, but the date is not known.

== Music and influence ==
Perissone was one of the followers of Willaert in the early time of development of the Italian madrigal, the period referred to by Alfred Einstein as the "madrigal's age of innocence". Even though he was a personal friend, he was not significantly influenced by fellow Willaert student Cipriano de Rore, the principal figure in madrigal composition in the 1550s, and whose style marked an extraordinary increase in expressive intensity of the secular vocal form.

In all, Perissone published four books of secular music by himself: a book of villanellas for four voices in 1545, a book of madrigals for four voices in 1547, and two books of madrigals for five voices, in 1545 and 1550. Some other individual madrigals appear in collections by others, particularly Cipriano de Rore, and Perissone wrote a dedicatory letter for one of Rore's books, but only in the alto part-book (Perissone was probably an alto). If he wrote any sacred music aside from a single five-voice motet setting of Ad Te, Domine (1549), it has not survived. While most of the composers who worked at San Marco in the 16th century left a substantial body of sacred music, Perissone was one of the few who did not.

Perissone was a versatile stylist, and wrote both light and serious madrigals, with a texture varying from the smooth polyphony of the Netherlanders to bright, largely chordal textures. Sometimes he anticipated harmonic developments of the 17th century, such as when he used the bass voice as a harmonic support rather than as an equal participant in the motivic interplay of a composition. He was also fond of false relations, as in his setting of Gottifredi's Deh, perchè com'è il vostro al nome mio, a madrigal which also contains deliberately mis-accented text setting, a characteristic which distinguishes him from his teacher Willaert, who was more inclined to follow Pietro Bembo's strict advice on text setting.
