= Antonio Rotta (lutenist) =

Antonio Rotta, sometimes given as Antonio Rota, (c. 1495 – 1549) was an Italian lutenist and composer.

== Biography ==
Rotta was most likely born in Padua in c. 1495, although this is not certain. A contemporary of Francesco Canova da Milano, he made important contributions to early Italian lute music. In 1560 Bernardino Scardeone wrote that Rotta's skills as a lutenist were unrivaled on the Italian peninsula and that he had become wealthy as a teacher of the lute. He was the author of instructional texts on lute performance, and was the composer of dance suites for the lute; including galliard, paduana, and passamezzo in triple meter. Some of his music was published by Petrus Phalesius the Elder. He died in Padua in 1549.
