= Samuel Besler =

German-Polish composer

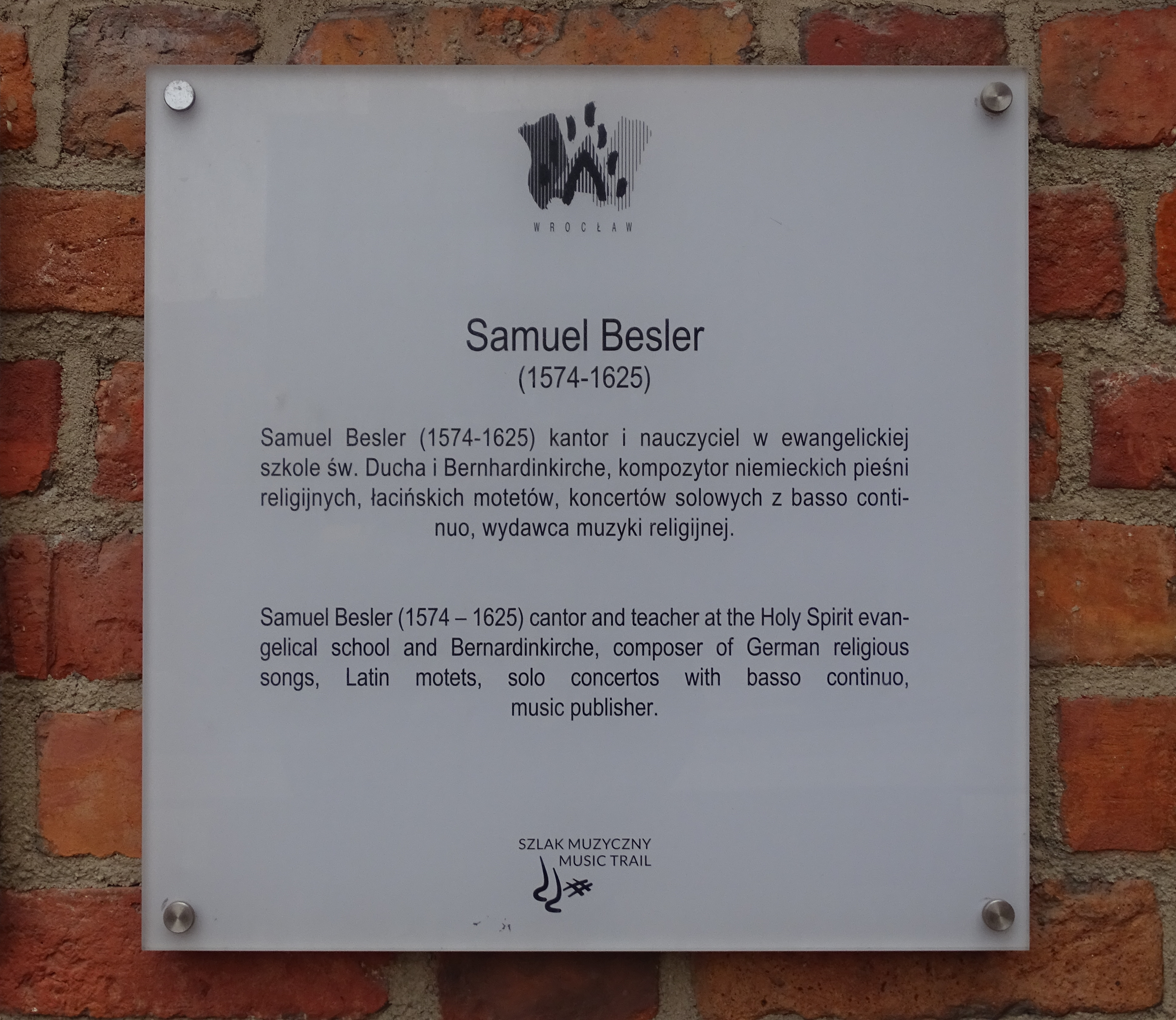
Plaque in tribute to Samuel Besler in Wrocław

Samuel Besler (15 December 1574, in Brieg – 19 July 1625) was a German composer. He was cantor at St. Bernhardinus, Breslau, in 1602, then rector of the Gymnasium from 1605. As with Jakob Meiland in the generation before him, and Melchior Vulpius in his own generation, his St. Matthew Passion follows the model of Johann Walter's Lutheran historia, but with more elaborate choral numbers.

== Works ==
- St Marcus Passion 1612
- St Matthew Passion
- St John Passion
