= Passion (music) =

Type of Christian music

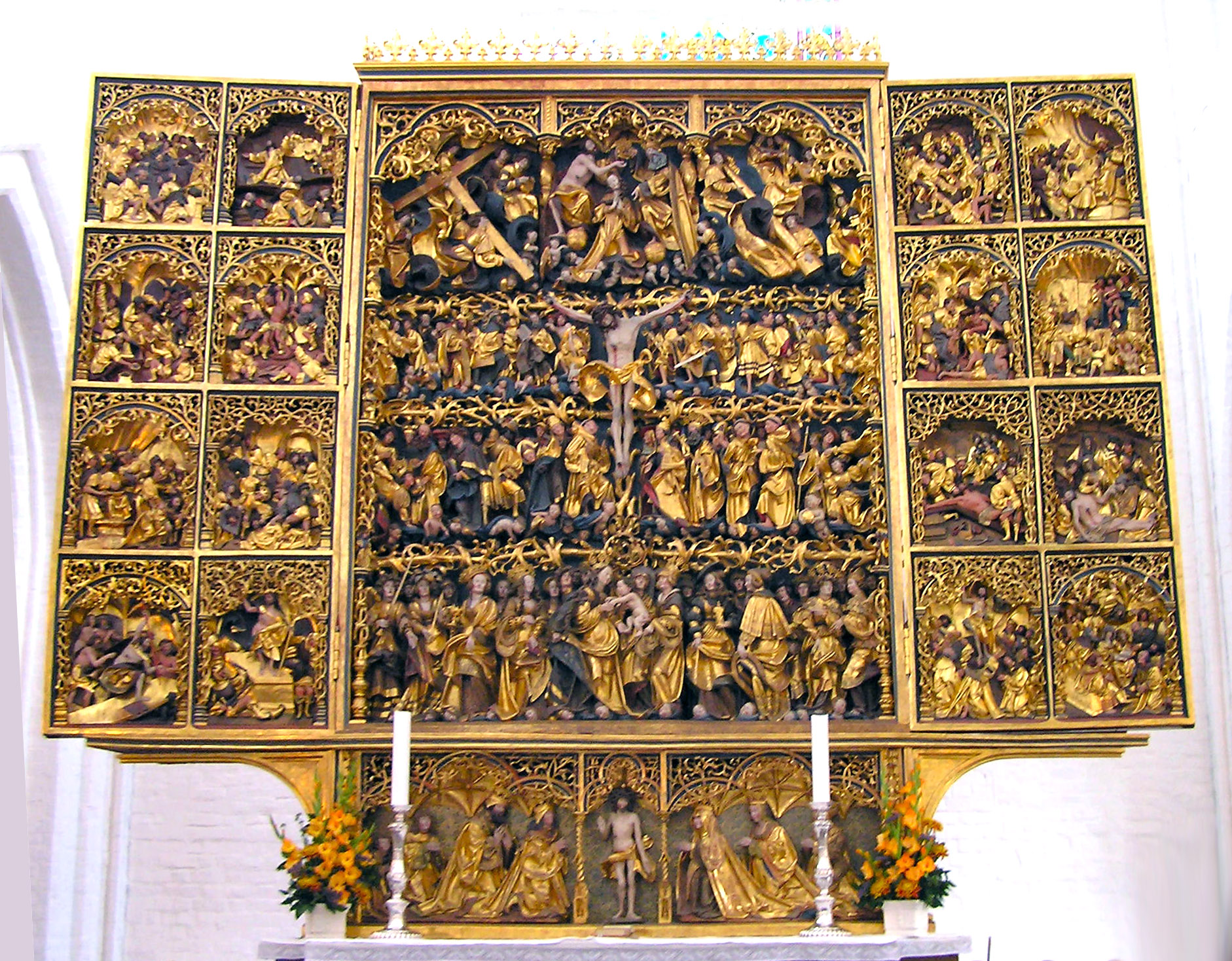
Carved wood Passion altarpiece, Odense Cathedral

In Christian music, a Passion is a setting of the Passion of Christ. Liturgically, most Passions were intended to be performed as part of church services in the Holy Week.

Passion settings developed from medieval intoned readings of the Gospel texts relating Christ's Passion, to which later polyphonic settings were added. Passion Plays, another tradition that originated in the Middle Ages, could be provided with music such as hymns, contributing to Passion as a genre in music.

While Passion music in Catholic countries had to compete with other devotions such as the Stations of the Cross, the Improperia and Tenebrae, in Protestant Germany settings of the Gospels became a focal point of Passiontide services, with Passion cantatas (and later Passions in oratorio format) performed on Passion Sunday, Palm Sunday and Good Friday. Its best known examples, the Bach Passions, date from the first half of the 18th century.

Later musical settings of the Passion of Christ, such as the Jesus Christ Superstar rock opera, or Arvo Pärt's Passio refer to these earlier Christian traditions to varying degrees.

== History ==
The reading of the Passion from one of the Gospels during Holy Week dates back at least to the 4th century and is described by Egeria. In the 5th century Pope Leo the Great specified that the gospel of Matthew be used on Palm Sunday and the following Wednesday and that of John on Good Friday; by the 10th century Luke replaced Matthew on Wednesday and Mark was added on Tuesday.

The passion began to be intoned (rather than just spoken) in the Middle Ages, at least as early at the 8th century. 9th-century manuscripts have "litterae significativae" indicating interpretive chant, and later manuscript begin to specify exact notes to be sung. By the 13th century different singers were used for different characters in the narrative, a practice which became fairly universal by the 15th century, when polyphonic settings of the turba passages began to appear also (Turba, while literally meaning "crowd," is used in this case to mean any passage in which more than one speaker speaks simultaneously). The formula of the present Graduale Romanum was the most widespread, with Christ singing in the lowest register and Synagogus (denoting not only the high priest but all characters besides Christ) singing higher than the evangelist/narrator. In Spain a Toledan tone with the evangelist's part recto tono (on a monotone) was used in Castile and a Saragossan tone with a bass evangelist and a florid tenor Christus was used in much of Aragon, where the Roman tone also had a foothold in Valencia.

Testimony – in parallel fifths – of the false witnesses from Guerrero's responsorial Matthew's Passion (1585).

In the later 15th century a number of new styles began to emerge:

- 'Responsorial Passions in which the narration is chanted but the turba parts and sometimes Christ's words are set polyphonically.
- Through-composed Passions, also called motet Passions, in which all text is set polyphonically. The earliest extant example of this type is sometimes attributed to Jacob Obrecht .
- Summa Passionis settings, drawing on all four Gospels. These were never incorporated into the liturgy of the church use but circulated widely nonetheless. The Seven Last Words (a text later set by Haydn and Théodore Dubois) are included in this category.

== Roman Catholic music ==
In the 16th century many settings, chiefly of the responsorial type, were written by William Byrd (St. John, 3vv), Jacobus Gallus, Francisco Guerrero (five including second St. John, mostly 5vv), Orlando di Lasso (all four, 4vv), Cypriano de Rore (St John) and Victoria.

In Roman Catholicism settings of (parts of) the Tenebrae service however became the leading format for music to commemorate Christ's Passion and death during Holy Week, with for example Leçons de ténèbres, Tenebrae responsories, and settings of the Miserere psalm. Notable examples of such music, like Gesualdo's Tenebrae Responsoria, are sometimes characterized as "a Passion in all but name".

A later development of the Catholic passion was the reflective passion-oratorio such as Metastasio's Italian libretto La passione di Gesù Cristo set by Caldara, Salieri and many other composers between 1730 and 1812.

Latin passions continued in parallel with the style of Metastasio, often set by minor composers such as little known Carlo Sturla, music master at the Convent of Santa Brigida, who also set a Latin passion in 18th Century operatic style, Passio di Venerdì Santo, for the Oratory of St Philip Neri in Genoa in 1736.

== Protestant music ==
Martin Luther wrote, "The Passion of Christ should not be acted out in words and pretense, but in real life." Luther felt that elaborate polyphony would distract from the importance of the sacred passion text. Despite this, sung Passion performances were common in Lutheran churches right from the start, in both Latin and German, beginning as early as Laetare Sunday (three weeks before Easter) and continuing through Holy Week. Luther's friend and collaborator Johann Walther wrote responsorial Passions which were used as models by Lutheran composers for centuries, and “summa Passionis” versions continued to circulate, despite Luther's express disapproval. Later sixteenth-century passions by G.M. Asola, Samuel Besler, William Byrd, Leonard Lechner, and Jakob Meiland included choral “exordium” (introduction) and “conclusio” sections with additional secular texts.

Thomas Strutz wrote a passion (1664) with arias for Jesus himself, pointing to the standard oratorio tradition of Schütz and Carissimi. The practice of using recitative for the Evangelist (rather than plainsong) was a development of court composers in northern Germany, such as Johann Meder and Schütz, and only crept into church compositions at the end of the 17th century. The recitative was used for dramatic expression.

In the 17th century came the development of “oratorio” passions which led to J.S. Bach’s passions, accompanied by instruments, with interpolated instrumental interludes (often called "sinfonias" or "sonatas") or with interpolated texts (then called “madrigal” movements) such as other Scripture passages, Latin motets, chorale arias, and more. Such settings were created by Bartholomäus Gesius and Heinrich Schütz.

The best known Protestant musical settings of the Passion are by Johann Sebastian Bach, who, according to his obituary, wrote five Passions in his lifetime. Two have survived to the present day: one based on the Gospel of John (the St John Passion), the other on the Gospel of Matthew (the St Matthew Passion). Additionally, a libretto for the St Mark Passion survives. Although Bach's settings are now among the most popular Passions today, they were rarely performed during his lifetime.

The Passion continued to be very popular in Protestant Germany in the 18th century, with Bach's second son Carl Philipp Emanuel composing over twenty settings. Major composers of passions included Graun, Telemann, Keiser, Stölzel, Mattheson and Handel - these last five also composing Brockes-Passions after the text of Barthold Heinrich Brockes.

== Romantic and Modern music ==
In the 19th century, Passion settings were less popular. Some examples of such works are the Oratorio Christus (Op. 97, 1847) by Felix Mendelssohn, Das Suhnopfer des neuen Bundes (1847) and Kleine Passionsmusik (?) of Carl Loewe, Les sept paroles du Christ (?) of Cesar Franck, John Stainer's The Crucifixion (1887), Die Passion (Op. 93, 1896) of Heinrich von Herzogenberg, and Christus. Mysterium in a Prelude and Three Oratorios (Opp. 70–73, 1899) by Felix Draeseke. However, in the 20th century, they have again come into fashion. Two notable settings are the St. Luke Passion (1965) by Polish composer Krzysztof Penderecki and the Passio (1982) by Estonian composer Arvo Pärt. Another is the Passionsmusik nach dem Lukasevangelium of Rudolf Mauersberger.

In 2000 Helmuth Rilling and the Internationale Bachakademie commissioned four modern composers to compose passions on the four Gospels; Matthew was allocated to Tan Dun - Water Passion After St Matthew, Mark to Osvaldo Golijov - La Pasión Según San Marcos, Luke to Wolfgang Rihm - Deus Passus, and John to Sofia Gubaidulina - St John Passion (Страсти по Иоанну).

== Examples ==
A relative of the musical Passion is the custom of setting the text of Stabat Mater to music.

=== English ===
In the English repertoire, the two classics are The Crucifixion (1887) by Sir John Stainer and Olivet to Calvary (1904) by John Henry Maunder. Other works include Sir Arthur Somervell's The Passion of Christ (1914), Charles Wood's St Mark Passion (1921) and Eric Thiman's The Last Supper (1930).

More recent examples include James MacMillan's Seven Last Words from the Cross (1993), the Passion According to St. Matthew (1997) by Mark Alburger, The Passion According to the Four Evangelists by Scott King The Passion and Resurrection According To St. Mark (2015/2017) by Christian Asplund, and St. Mark Passion (2024) by Douglas Balliett.

Andrew Lloyd Webber's Jesus Christ Superstar (book and lyrics by Tim Rice), and Stephen Schwartz's Godspell both contain elements of the traditional passion accounts. Another modern version is by Adrian Snell (1980). Peter Gabriel's score to Martin Scorsese's 1988 film the Last Temptation of Christ was released as an album under the title Passion: Music for The Last Temptation of Christ.

=== German ===
German Passion cantatas include Der Tod Jesu (1755), with text by Karl Wilhelm Ramler and music by Georg Philipp Telemann, Carl Philipp Emanuel Bach, and by Carl Heinrich Graun, and the Passion Cantatas Die letzten Leiden des Erlösers (1770), with text by various people and music by Carl Philipp Emanuel Bach (taken largely from his St Matthew Passion of 1769) and Gottfried August Homilius's cantata Ein Lämmlein geht und trägt die Schuld HoWV 12 (1775). A later example is Das Sühnopfer des neuen Bundes by Carl Loewe (1847). In Danish there are also passion cantatas with music by the Bach critic Johann Adolf Scheibe to the text, Vor Harpe er bleven til Sorrig by Johannes Ewald, and the Sørge-Cantata ved Christi Grav Herrens Salvede, som var vor Næses Aand by the same librettist and composer.

=== Latin ===
Stanzas of the medieval hymn Salve mundi salutare – also known as the Rhythmica oratio –, a poem formerly ascribed to St. Bonaventure or Bernard of Clairvaux, but now thought more likely to have been written by medieval poet Arnulf of Leuven (died 1250) was arranged as a cycle of seven cantatas in 1680 by Dieterich Buxtehude, Membra Jesu Nostri. Franz Liszt included an arrangement of Paul Gerhardt's O Haupt voll Blut und Wunden in the sixth station of his Via crucis (Stations of the Cross), Saint Veronica wipes the Holy Face.

A notable work in Latin is Arvo Pärt's Passio Domini Nostri Jesu Christi secundum Joannem (The Passion of Our Lord Jesus Christ according to John) of 1982.

=== Other ===
- St. Luke Passion (1966) of Penderecki
- Passion Cantata "Vor Harpe er bleven til Sorrig" with text by Johannes Ewald and music by the Bach critic Johann Adolf Scheibe,
- Sørge-Cantata ved Christi Grav "Herrens Salvede, som var vor Næstes Aand" by the same librettist and composer.
