= Bernardo Clavijo del Castillo =

Spanish Composer

Bernardo Clavijo del Castillo (1545 – February 1, 1626) was a Spanish composer, organist, harpsichordist, and teacher.

He served as master of chapel and organist to Philip III of Spain as well as the organist at the Royal Chapel in Madrid.

His Tiento de 2° Tono por Jesolreut is the earliest known example of a tiento de falsas.

== Personal life ==
Little is known about Clavijo's early life, though through the accounts of acquaintances and his early education choices, it's believed that he is from the far north of Spain.

He married María Carrión on December 12, 1594 and they had three children together: Antonio (b. 1595, an organist), Bernardina (b. 1598; a composer and performer), and Francisco (b. 1605; a composer and organist). After the death of his first wife, he remarried on August 3, 1618, to Ana del Valle and they had a daughter, Ana Maria.

He died on February 1, 1626, in Madrid.

== Career ==
After having followed the Spanish military to Italy, he became employed as a musician at the R. Chiesa di San Pietro at Palermo c. December 6, 1569.

c. 1588 he worked as an organist in the service of the Duke of Alba at the vice-royal court at Naples.

He attended the University of Oñati from 1588 to 1595, where he received both Bachelor and master's degrees, and while doing so was the organist at the Palencia Cathedral from 1589 to 1592.

On April 3, 1593, he was hired as the chair of music at the University of Salamanca, considered one of the most prestigious positions in Spain during the late Renaissance. By January 10, 1603, he had vacated his position in Salamanca and began his time as Philip III of Spain's master of chapel and organist, in Valladolid when it was the capitol and then in Madrid, succeeding both his brother Diego del Castillo (d. May 11, 1601) as well as Hernando de Cabezón. In 1619 he would go on to be the organist of the Royal Chapel in Madrid. His son, Francisco Clavijo del Castillo, would go on to inherit the position from his father after having served as his assistant.

== Works ==
In Rome in 1588, he published a book of 19 motets, "suitable for instruments as well as voices"; 6 each a 4-, a 5-, a 6-, and one an 8-part motet.

A fire in Royal Palace of Madrid destroyed a collection of his works in 1731, but the aforementioned book of motets and his Organ Tiento (Tiento de 2° Tono por Jesolreut) from El Escorial, survives. This tiento is the earliest known example of a tiento de falsas, a model consisting of a section of imitation followed by a section of counterpoint.
