= Giovan Tomaso di Maio =

Italian composer

Giovan Tomaso di Maio (also Majo, Mayo; c. 1490 – after 1548) was an Italian composer. His villanelle, like those of Giovanni Domenico da Nola, were popular throughout Italy.
