= Balthasar Resinarius =

16th-century German composer

- Born: Balthasar Harzer c. 1483; Tetschen
- Died: 12 April 1544; Leipa
- Education: University of Leipzig
- Occupations: Composer; Lutheran bishop

Balthasar Resinarius (born Balthasar Harzer; c. 1483 – 12 April 1544) was a German composer, and a Lutheran bishop, one of the first Lutherans in Bohemia.

== Life and career ==
It is regarded as proven the Resinarius, listed by the music publisher Georg Rhau, is identical with the composer Balthasar Harzer, also listed by Rhau. Harzer was born in Tetschen, Bohemia. He received his musical education as a choir boy in the court chapel of King Maximilian I in Munich. He was also a pupil of Heinrich Isaac there. In 1515, he was enrolled as Baldassar Harczer to study at the University of Leipzig. From 1523, he worked on the initiative of Johann VI. von Saalhausen as a Catholic priest in his home town. He got into a fierce dispute with a Lutheran preacher, in the course of which he turned to the Bohemian king for help while the other party sought help from Martin Luther himself. It is not known whether this early and intense confrontation with the new faith led him to convert to Lutheranism. From 1534, he was active, under his Latin name Resinarius as Lutheran pastor. He was bishop in Leipa from c. 1544 until his death.

He died in Leipa.

After Resinarius' death, the Renaissance humanist Georg Hansch, who lived in Leipa, published several commemorative publications ("Epitaphs") in memory of him; these present him as a kind and friendly, also helpful and with a beautiful voice talented person. In particular, Hansch repeatedly praises his striking, outstanding gift as a speaker and his theological scholarship and persuasiveness – with which he had won many followers for the Protestant teaching.

== Importance ==
As a composer, Resinarius is regarded as one of the most important representatives of the first Protestant generation. His works are only known through the publications of Georg Rhau. He was directly inspired to write these works by the latter, who also introduced him, in the preface to his Responsories, as an aged and hitherto unknown master. In his publication Encomion Musicae (1551), the author Johannes Holtheuser counted the composer among the most famous masters of his time. Especially noteworthy from the series of publications by Georg Rhau is the individual print of 1543 with compositions by Resinarius; this is, apart from a publication of the works of Sixt Dietrich, the only publication Rhaus with works by only one composer (individual print). These pieces by the master found a wide distribution due to the publication of Georg Rhau in relevant manuscripts of the 16th century.

The works of Resinarius correspond in content and composition in an excellent way to the efforts to provide music for the services of the early Lutheran church. The composer's stylistic means are rather conservative: a clear and concise declamation oriented to the cantus firmus, a rhythmic and melodic balance, a frequently encountered parallel course of the voices among themselves and the absence of any articial counterpoint. These lead to an always clearly understandable text presentation with sometimes confessional forcefulness. Typical of his writing style are also numerous archaic elements (Landini cadence, cadences with double leading-tone, also empty sounds etc.). The Johannespassion by Resinarius is one of the few through-composed passions from the first half of the 16th century that is strictly based on the liturgical Passion tone. It also betrays both lyrically and musically, as does the St. Mark Passion by Johannes Galliculus, the model for the through-composed Passions by Jacob Obrecht and Antoine de Longueval. (around 1498 – 1525). If one compares them with the Passions of Longueval, for example, one notices the numerous internal cadenzas, which partly override the structure of the text.

== Work ==
The works of Resinarius are exclusively vocal music and are based, with one exception, on publications by Georg Rhau in Wittenberg:

- 4 hymns for four voices: "Caeduntur gladiis", "Deus tuorum militum", "Jesus corona virginum" and "Urbs beata Jerusalem", 1542, as Balthasar Hartzer
- collection Responsoriorum numero octoginta de tempore et festis iuxta seriem totius anni, Libri duo. Primus de Christo, & regno eius, Doctrina, Vita, Passione, Resurrectione & Ascensione. Alter, de Sanctis, & illorum in Christum fide & Cruce for four voices, 1543, 2nd edition 1544
- 30 chorale settings for four voices, 1544, including "Ach Gott, vom Himmel sieh darein", "Gelobet seist du, Jesu Christ" and "Nun komm, der Heiden Heiland"
- Introit "Deus misericordiam" for four voices, 1545
- 3 motets for four voices: Factum est autem, In principio erat verbum and Liber generationis, 1545
- 3 verses for two voices: Eya inquit Paulus, Tradiderunt and Vigilia te ergo, 1545 (not published by Georg Rhau)
- Hymn Beatus author saeculi for four voices
- 4 other hymns for four voices.
