= Das Sühnopfer des neuen Bundes =

Das Sühnopfer des neuen Bundes ("The expiatory sacrifice of the New Covenant") is an 1847 passion oratorio by Carl Loewe after a libretto by Wilhelm Telschow (1809–1872). The libretto contains poetic-dramatic paraphrasing of the biblical Passion stories.

== Recordings ==
- Das Sühnopfer des neuen Bundes, Chor der St. Nikolauskirche Frauenfeld; Collegium Musicum St. Gallen; Mario Schwarz, 2CD FSM 1991
- Das Sühnopfer des neuen Bundes, Nathalie Gaudefroy (soprano), Christianne Stotjin (contralto), Jacky da Cunha (tenor), Henk Neven (bass), Edwin Crossley-Mercer (bass), Ensemble Instrumental des Heures Romantiques, Ensemble Vocal des Heures Romantiques, Udo Reinemann 2CD Naxos
- Das Sühnopfer des neuen Bundes, Arcis-Vocalisten München, Monika Mauch (soprano), Ulrike Malotta (mezzo-soprano), Georg Poplutz (tenor), Andreas Burkhart (bass), Barockorchester L'arpa festante, Thomas Gropper; 2CD Oehms 2019
