= Bernardino Scardeone =

Italian priest and historian (died 1574)

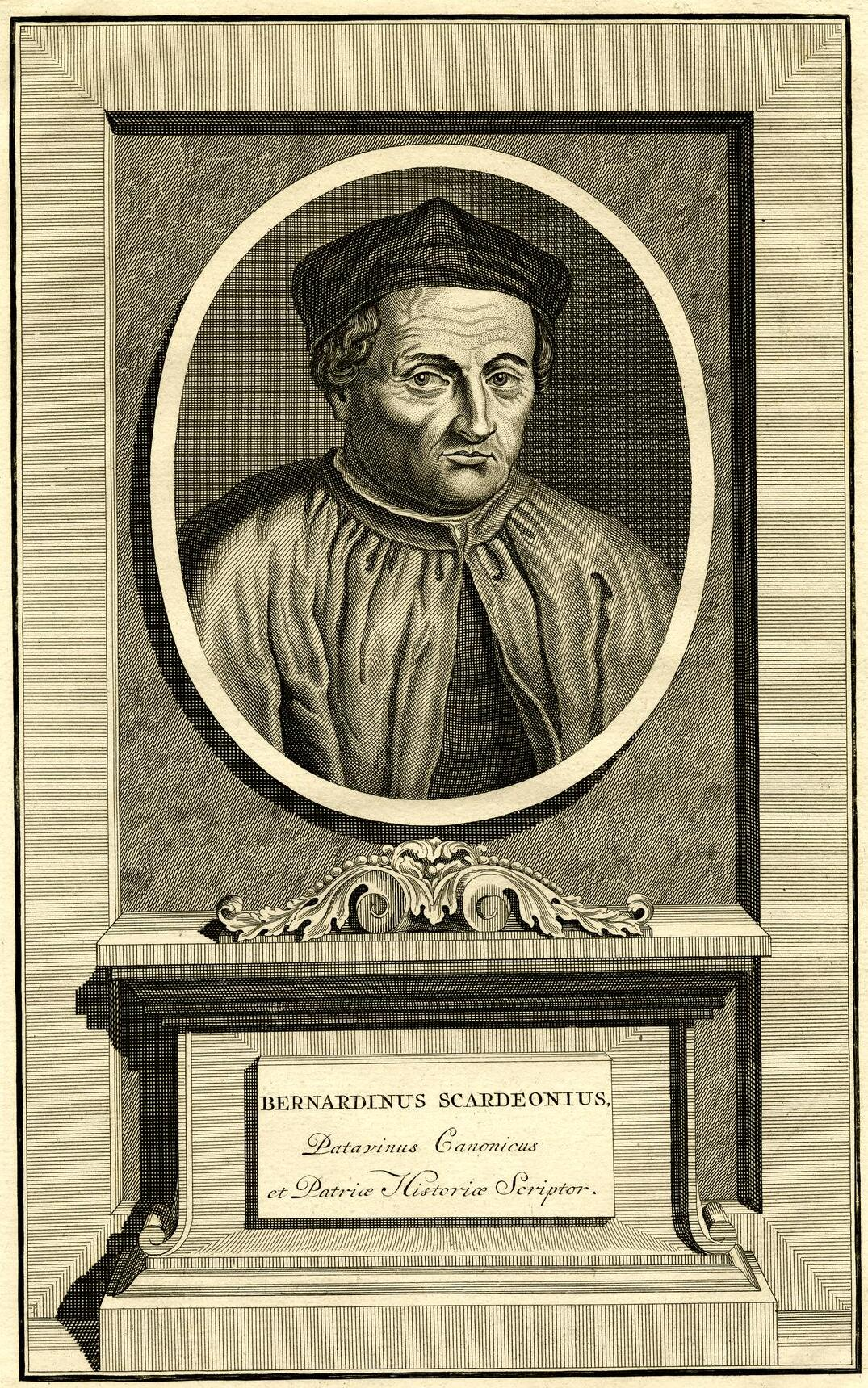
- Bernardino Scardeone
- Born: 1478 or 1482; Padua, Italy
- Died: May 29, 1574; Italy
- Occupations: Historian, Cleric

Bernardino Scardeone (Padua, 1478 or 1482 – 29 May 1574) was an Italian historian, writer, and cleric, known for his scholarly works on the history of Padua.

== Life ==
Scardeone was born in Padua in 1482 to the artisan Angelo Scardeone and his wife Giacoma (born Nardini). (The descent that he later claimed from the noble da Carturo family was his own invention). He was the second child in a family of seven, of whom one brother became an Olivetan monk and two others became a doctor and a surgeon.

Scardeone was ordained a priest in December 1505 and on 1 June 1506 the bishop of Padua Pietro Barozzi appointed him rector of the church of S. Maria di Murelle.

In 1538, Scardeone completed the seven books of De castitate ("Of chastity"), the most demanding of his religious works. In 1540, Scardeone had obtained the position, which he held until his death, of confessor of the Benedictine nuns of S. Stefano.

Having reached the peak of his ecclesiastical career in 1556, Scardeone shortly thereafter also set about publishing his major work, De antiquitate urbis Patavii et claris civibus Patavinis libri tres, in quindecim classes distincti, a biographical dictionary of illustrious Paduans, from the Roman age to 1559.

== Works ==
- De castitate libri septem, 1542.
- Nave evangelica esposizione per la religione, 1551.
- De antiquitate urbis Patavii, & claris civibus Patavinis libri tres, in quindecim classes distincti, 1560.
