= Gasparo Alberti =

Italian composer

Gasparo Alberti (also: Gaspar de Albertis; Gaspare Albertus; Gaspar bergomensis; Gaspar de padua; c. 1485 – c. 1560) was an Italian composer.

He was born in Padua, and worked through the ranks at the basilica of Santa Maria Maggiore, in Bergamo, starting as a cleric in 1503, he becoming choir master in 1508 and magister cappellae by 1525. He was forced to retire in 1550, but was reappointed and worked there until 1559. Alberti was one of the first composers to use a number of new techniques, including the use of cori spezzati and salmi spezzati, especially within the Passion, where he used it for both the turba and the words of Jesus, or vox Christi. Alberti's Passions were the first to set Jesus' words polyphonically. Although he was an early user of these techniques, he is not believed to have originated them or disseminated them significantly. Despite this, he was an important force in Italian sacred music, especially in the period before Palestrina. His book of masses was the first to be published by a single Italian composer. Alberti's works were rediscovered by Danish musicologist Knud Jeppesen in the 1960s.
