= Vincenzo Fontana (composer) =

Italian composer

Vincenzo Fontana (fl. 1550) was an Italian composer. He was mainly known for his canzoni villanesche.
