= Cesario Gussago =

Italian composer

Cesario Gussago (1550-1612) was an Italian priest, musician and composer of the late Renaissance era. He studied philosophy and theology at the University of Pavia and served as church organist in Brescia at Santa Maria della Grazia. In 1599 he was Vicar-General of the Order of S. Gerolamo in Brescia. In 1608 he published a collection of sonatas in the canzona style of the late 16th century, titled Sonate a quattro sei et otto.

== Works ==
Selected works include:

- 1. La Cornala a4
- 2. La Fontana a4
- 3. La Faustinella a4
- 4. La Rizza a4
- 5. La Schilina a4
- 6. La Mallonia a4
- 7. La Squizzerotta a4
- 8. La Bottana a4
- 9. La Zonta a4
- 10. La Nicolina a4
- 11. La Marina a6
- 12. L'Angioletta a6
- 13. La Badina a6
- 14. La Facca a6
- 15. L'Onofria a8
- 16. La Tonina a8
- 17. La Terza a8
- 18. La Porcelaga a8
- 19. La Leona a8
- 20. La Luzzara a8
- 21. Anima mea liquefacta est a 8
- 22. Fili ego Salomon a 8
- 23. Ad te Domine levavi a 8
- 24. Confitebor tibi Domine a 8
- 25. Exultavit cor meum in Domino a 8
- 26. Cantemus Domino a 8
- 27. Salvum me fac Deus a 8
- 28. Confitemini Domino a 8
