= Christoph Straus =

Austrian composer (1575–1631)

Christoph Straus (1575–1631) was an Austrian composer, cantor and organist. His church music includes polyphonic pieces and polychoral Masses, including a notable Requiem for high and low choirs. Although his textures were, by current standards, old-fashioned at the time, his word painting proves his acquaintance with the newest Italian music. He was employed as Court composer by Emperor Ferdinand II from 1616 to 1620 and rose to the post of Kapellmeister in St Stephen's Cathedral. He wrote 36 motets (published in 1613) and 16 surviving masses (1631). His later compositions require a wide variety of orchestral colours.
