= Cesare Bendinelli =

Italian trumpeter (c.1542–1617)

Cesare Bendinelli (c.1542–1617) was an Italian trumpeter who was the principal trumpet player of the Viennese court from 1567 to 1580.

Bendinelli was born in Verona, Italy. From 1580 till his death he played for the court of Munich, Bavaria (now part of Germany), where he died.

Bendinelli was also the author of the first known course of published trumpet lessons, Tutta L'arte Della Trombetta (c. 1614) which gathered together the earliest known pieces for the clarino register, dating from 1584 to 1588. He also authored Rotta Ò Sonata (probably his most famous piece). A version of this piece, arranged by Michael Curran and orchestrated by Geoff Knorr was used in Sid Meier's Civilization V: Brave New World as the theme for Enrico Dandolo, leader of Venice.
