= Girolamo Conversi =

Italian composer

Girolamo Conversi (fl. 1572–1575) was an Italian composer of the late Renaissance. His music, which was popular from the 1570s through the 1590s, was noted for its combination of the light canzone alla napolitana with the literary and musical sophistication of the madrigal. He appears to have written only secular vocal music.

== Life ==
Little is known of his life but what can be inferred from the dedications to his madrigal books. He was born in Correggio in Reggio Emilia. In 1575 he dedicated a book of madrigals to Antoine Perrenot de Granvelle, the Spanish Viceroy of Naples, and described himself as being in that man's service. Whether he lived in Naples at the time, or elsewhere in the Spanish Kingdom of Naples, is not known. Since his only publications after 1575 are reprints – in copious quantity – he may have died around that year. Unusually for a popular composer of the time, he seems to have held no positions either in aristocratic courts or religious institutions for which records have been kept.

== Music and influence ==
Conversi's music is distinguished by its marriage of the lightness of the Neapolitan villanella, also known as the canzone alla napolitana, with the more serious and literary character of the madrigal. The combination was successful, and Conversi's music was reprinted often during the late 16th century; his music appeared in anthologies as far away as England. His first collection, a book of canzoni alla napoletana for five voices originally published in 1572, went through no less than seven reprints before 1589. Another publication of Conversi's, possibly posthumous, is a volume of madrigals for six voices which appeared in 1584, but which was probably a reprint of an earlier volume, the original for which has been lost. Yet another book of madrigals, for five voices, is mentioned in a 1604 catalogue of publications by the Florentine Giunti firm of booksellers and printers, but no copy of it has yet been found.

Conversi rarely (if ever) set verse by living poets, preferring writers such as Petrarch, Pietro Bembo, Castiglione, and Luca Contile. Nowhere is his tendency to use sharp contrasts to underline and enhance his texts more apparent than in his setting of Petrarch's Zefiro torna, a setting which was evidently known to Claudio Monteverdi, whose own version in his Sixth Book of Madrigals is considerably more famous. The form of the poem is a Petrarchan sonnet, and Conversi sets the octave, which celebrates the return of springtime, with a quick and light patter of notes drawn from the pastoral Neapolitan canzona; and the sestet, in which the lover mourns the loss of his beloved, arrives in a sombre and slow G minor.

Some of Conversi's vocal textures show the influence of instrumental music, as they have homophonic and dancelike sections easily playable on instruments without changing a note. Orazio Vecchi was likely familiar with these works, as is evident from his own compositions in the style. While Vecchi held a post in Correggio in the 1580s, it is not known if the two men were acquaintances.

== Links ==
- Free scores by Girolamo Conversi in the Choral Public Domain Library (ChoralWiki)
