= Lambert de Sayve =

Flemish composer

Lambert de Sayve, also Saive or Seave (1548 or 1549 in Saive, near Liège – 1614 in Linz), was a Flemish composer.

== Life ==
He was a choirboy in his youth at St. Lambert's Cathedral, Liège. As early as 1562 he sang in the Imperial Chapel in Vienna. In 1569 he was master at Melk Abbey. In the years 1570 to 1571 we find him at the court of Archduchess Anna Maria for her wedding to the King of Spain Philip II. From 1577 to 1582 Sayve served the Archduke Charles in Graz. From 1583 he was Kapellmeister at the court of the Archduke Matthias.

His brother Mathias de Sayve (before 1550–1619) was also active in the Viennese court chapel.

== Works ==
- 3 Motets (in Giovanelli Book, 1568)
- Primo libro delle canzoni napolitana (Vienna 1582)
- Missa super Dominus regnavit, 16v
- Missa super Omnes gentes, 16v
- Missa super Lyram pulset, 5v
- De confessoribus, Adorans Daniel Deum
- Teutsche Liedlein (1602)
- Maria rein mit dein Sohn gmein, 5v (1604)
- Crucifixus (1605)
- The collection Sacrae symphoniae (Klosterbruck 1612) 4–16 voices

== Sources ==
- Richard Marlow's article in [New Grove Dictionary of Music]
