= Jacques Buus =

Franco-Flemish composer

Jacques Buus (also Jakob Buus, Jachet de Buus) (c. 1500 – late August, 1565) was a Franco-Flemish composer and organist of the Renaissance, and an early member of the Venetian School. He was one of the earliest composers of the ricercar, the predecessor to the fugue, and he was also a skilled composer of chansons.

== Life ==
Buus was probably born in Ghent around 1500, though details of his early life, as is the case with most Renaissance composers, are scanty. Possibly he either studied or had his early career in France, and he maintained some connections there throughout his life. In 1538, he published his first chansons, in Lyon by the printer Jacques Moderne.

Three years later, he went to Venice and auditioned for the post of second organist at St. Mark's, winning the job and working alongside the existing organist, Giovanni Armonio. This was during the tenure of Adrian Willaert, who built the musical forces at St. Mark's into one of the most impressive in Europe, second only in quality to the papal chapel in Rome. Buus stayed at St. Mark's until 1550, when he departed for France, ostensibly because he was unable to pay his debts; however it has been suggested that he left because he had become a Protestant. In 1543, he had dedicated a volume of chansons to the Calvinist Duchess of Ferrara and, in 1550, he sent a book of Protestant chansons spirituelles to the Protestant Archduke Ferdinand II in Vienna. Late in 1550, he went to Vienna to work at the Habsburg court and he remained there for the rest of his life, ignoring entreaties from Venice to return.

== Music and influence ==
Buus was influential in the development of the instrumental ricercar; he wrote the longest ever composed, one of which has no less than 98 points of imitation. Another has 358 breves (equivalent to 716 bars of 4/4; at the typical tactus of the time — 60 to 80 minims, i.e. half-notes, to the minute — the piece would take 15–20 minutes to play). They are elaborately contrapuntal, making use of all the standard devices of Franco-Flemish polyphony, including augmentation, diminution, inversion, and so forth.

He also wrote sacred vocal music, including motets and chansons spirituelles, a specifically Protestant form, although these were not for performance in Catholic Venice. The motets are similar in style to those of Nicolas Gombert, with dense textures, pervasive imitation, and free treatment of the source material.

== References and further reading ==
- Sadie, Stanley, ed. (1980). The New Grove Dictionary of Music and Musicians. Vol. 3. London: Macmillan Publishers Ltd. ISBN 978-0-33323-111-1. OCLC 819672161.
- Reese, Gustave (1959). Music in the Renaissance (Revised ed.). New York City: W.W. Norton & Co. ISBN 0-393-09530-4. LCCN 59012879. OL 18078215M – via Internet Archive.
- Selfridge-Field, Eleanor (1994). Venetian Instrumental Music, from Gabrieli to Vivaldi (3rd revised ed.). New York City: Dover Publications. ISBN 978-0-486-28151-3. LCCN 94008060. OL 1084342M – via Internet Archive.
