= Bálint Bakfark =

Hungarian musician (16th century)

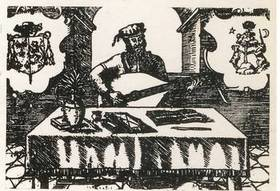
- Bálint Bakfark
- Born: Valentin Bakfark c. 1507; Brassó, Kingdom of Hungary (today Brașov, Romania)
- Died: 15 or 22 August 1576; Padua, Republic of Venice
- Other names: Valentin Bakfark; Bacfarc; Bakfarc; Bakfarkh; Bakffark; Backuart

Bálint Bakfark (Hungarian: [ˈbaːlint ˈbɒkfɒrk]; in contemporary sources Valentin Bakfark or (from 1565 onward) Valentin Greff alias Bakfark, his name is variously spelled as Bacfarc, Bakfarc, Bakfarkh, Bakffark, Backuart) (c. 1507 – 15 or 22 August 1576) was a Hungarian composer of Transylvanian Saxon origin, and lutenist of the Renaissance. He was enormously influential as a lutenist in his time, and renowned as a virtuoso on the instrument.

== Life ==
He was born in Brassó, Transylvania, Kingdom of Hungary (today Brașov in Romania), into a family of Transylvanian Saxon origin. An orphan, he was brought up by the Greff family and was educated in Buda at the court of John Zápolya. Bakfark remained there until 1540, though he possibly traveled to Italy once during this time.

Sometime in the 1540s he traveled to Paris, but, finding the position of lutenist to the king filled, he left for Jagiellon Poland in 1549, where he was employed as a court lutenist by Sigismund II Augustus. From then until 1566, he traveled extensively around Europe, with his renown increasing, but remained faithful to his employer in spite of numerous efforts by other monarchs to win him away; the riches bestowed on him by Sigismund may have affected his decision to remain attached to the court of Palace of the Grand Dukes of Lithuania in Vilnius.

What happened to him in 1566 is not precisely known, but he clearly did something to provoke the wrath of the king, and scarcely had time to flee before Polish army troops ransacked his house and destroyed his possessions. After this, he lived for a while in Vienna and then returned to Transylvania, but not for long; in 1571 he moved to Padua in Italy, where he remained until his death during the plague of 1576.

As was common practice at the time, all the possessions of plague victims were destroyed by fire, so most of his manuscript music was lost.

== Music and influence ==
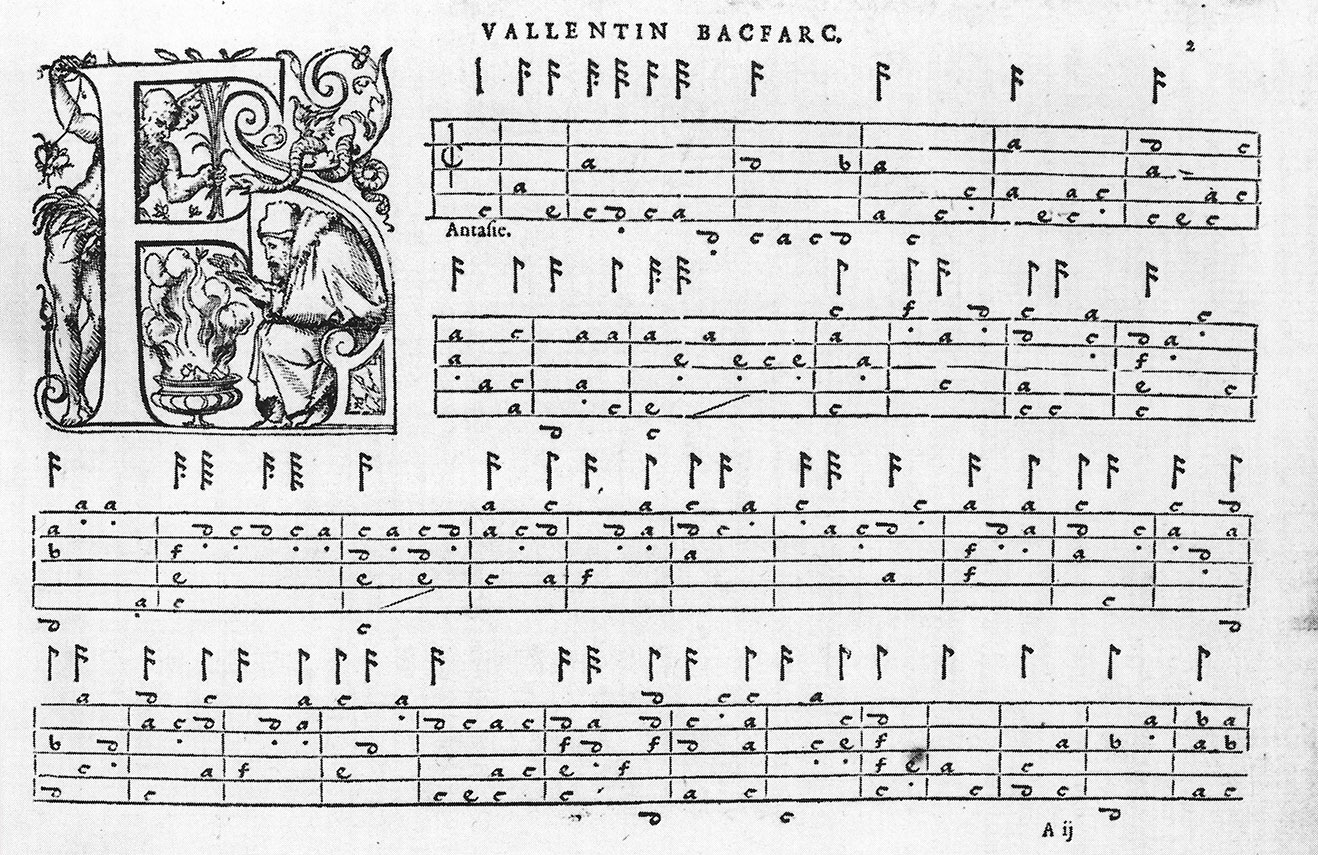
Music sheet by Bakfark with French tablature

While Bakfark almost certainly wrote an enormous amount of music, very little was printed: a commonly given reason was that it was simply too difficult for others to play. His surviving works include ten fantasies, seven madrigals, eight chansons, and fourteen motets—all in amazingly faithful polyphonic arrangements for lute alone. Additionally, he transcribed vocal motets by contemporary composers such as Josquin des Prez, Clemens non Papa, Nicolas Gombert, and Orlando di Lasso into arrangements for the lute.
