= Carlo Sturla =

Italian composer

Carlo Sturla (active 1730s) was an Italian composer. He was music master for the nuns at the Convent of Santa Brigida, Genoa, where a century earlier Andrea Falconieri had also worked. He is known solely for his Passio di Venerdi Santo, a Latin passion in 18th century operatic style, composed for the local Oratory of San Filippo Neri in 1736. This was recorded for Brilliant Classics by Luca Franco Ferrari in 2010. Performing editions of his Pastorale, Taedet animam, Kyrie 1° e 2°, Christe, Gloria, were prepared for performance in Genoan by Adelchi Amisano in 1971.
