= Nicolao Dorati =

Italian composer

Nicolao Dorati (c. 1513 – February 1593) was an Italian composer and trombone player of the Renaissance, active in Lucca. Although he was primarily an instrumentalist, all of his published music is vocal, and consists mainly of madrigals.

A few details are known of his life. He was part of a family of musicians, many of whom were trombonists in Lucca, and he was born in that town. A younger brother, Bartolomeo, also played the trombone. Nicolao was hired as a trombonist by the city when it created the Cappella di Palazzo in 1543, and in 1557 he became director of that ensemble, a position he kept for the rest of his life.

Most of Dorati's surviving music was published in Venice. He produced three collections of madrigals for five voices (1549, 1561, 1567); a book of madrigals for from five to eight voices (1551); a collection of madrigals for four voices entitled Le stanze della signora Vittoria Colonna (1570); and a book of madrigals for six voices (1579). In addition to this considerable output of secular music, he wrote at least three motets, two of which were for six voices and published in 1585, and one of which survives incomplete. Additionally, a few works appear in publications primarily devoted to the music of others. As is usual with composers of the time, much of his music may not have been published and could be lost. Even though he was a professional trombonist, he is not known to have written any instrumental music.

His madrigals often use the new time signature (C – the misura cromatica) rather than the increasingly archaic, the misura comune. Some of them use a declamatory and chordal style related to that concurrently being developed in Florence by Francesco Corteccia and others. Other innovative features include the use of five or more voices, including division of the ensemble into two groups for the madrigals for six to eight voices (polychoral music was in its infancy in the mid-16th century, and even then was a relative rarity outside of Venice).

One of his madrigals, a setting of the several stanzas of Ariosto's romantic epic Orlando Furioso describing the charms of the sorceress Alcina, appears in a collection by Cipriano de Rore, indicating the esteem in which the composer was held, either by Rore or his Venetian publisher. These same stanzas were set by numerous other composers of the same era, including a young Orlande de Lassus.
