= Placido Falconio =

Italian composer

Placido Falconio, also called Falconi in some sources, was an Italian composer of the 16th century. His birth and death dates are unknown; his first publication dates from 1575, his last from 1588.

In 1549, he entered a Benedictine monastery, and the title pages of his published works indicate that he was a monk in the abbey of Monte Cassino at the time of their printing. According to the dedication of Falconio's Psalmodia vespertina (Vespers psalms), the composer was part of a group or consortium that helped introduce Venetian music printing methods into his native Brescia.

Falconio's works are all of the sacred vocal category, and include introits, alleluias, magnificats, psalm settings, and works relating to the Passion. He seems to have taken pains in many cases to make his works readily performable even for less-trained forces in smaller parishes. This is illustrated in that, despite the prevailing atmosphere of polychoral works, or at least works for five or more voices, Falconio wrote often for but four voices, and even for three on one occasion, a Voces Christi. Contributing also to this accessibility is the simple, homophonic nature shared by many of his works, though of course such an idiom had begun to dominate in the post-Tridentine era of the 1570s and 1580s. Perhaps more telling, then, of Falconio's practicality is that, when he did compose in a more contrapuntal fashion, in his collection Introitus et Alleluia per omnes festivitates totius anni, he included an explicit part for organ accompaniment in the publication. While Falconio almost surely did not invent the technique, and this work of 1575 is very probably pre-dated by the presence of other such organ parts in manuscript, it contains the first known published example of basso seguente. This technique, in which a line for organ simply provides the lowest note being sounded in the vocal parts at any given time, is the precursor of the basso continuo (for further explanation of this, see Figured bass).
