= Santino Garsi da Parma =

Italian lutenist and composer

- Born: February 22, 1542
- Died: January 17, 1604 (aged 61)
- Occupation(s): Lutenist, Composer

Santino Garsi da Parma (February 22, 1542 – January 17, 1604) was an Italian lutenist and composer of the late Renaissance period.

His music was used as a basis for part of the Ancient Airs and Dances Suite No. 3 by Ottorino Respighi.
