= Adam Berg (publisher) =

German printer and publisher (1540–1610)

Adam Berg (1540–1610) was a German printer and publisher who is best remembered for his work as a music publisher and for his publication of Catholic religious texts. His publishing company was based in Munich, and he actively published music there from 1567 to 1597. His most notable music publication was Patrocinium musicum which was published in ten volumes from 1573 to 1580, five of which were devoted to music by composer Orlande de Lassus.

== Sources ==
- Bibliographie des chants populaires français by Paul de Beaurepaire-Froment
- Ecrits de musiciens by Jacques-Gabriel Prod’homme
