= Jakob Meiland =

German composer (1542–1577)

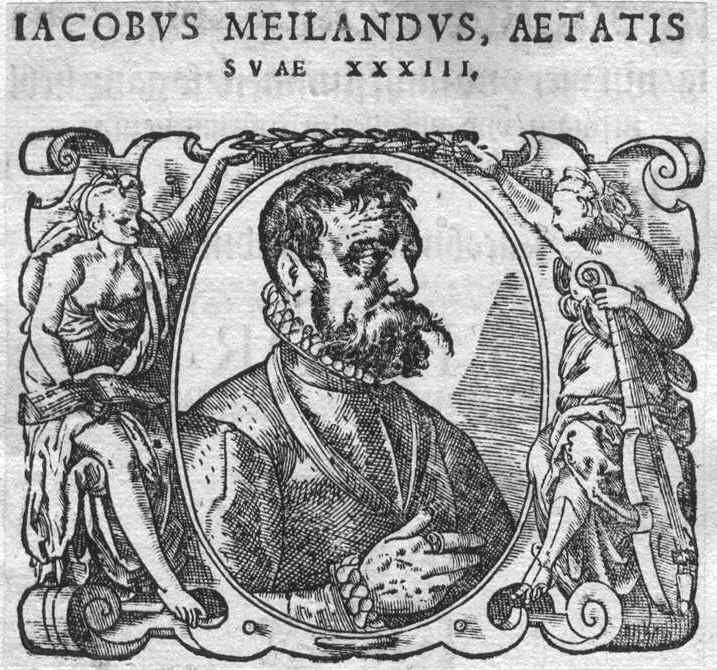
Jakob Meiland (1575)

Jakob Meiland (Senftenberg, 1542 – Hechingen, 31 December 1577) was a German composer. His St. Matthew Passion follows the model of Johann Walter's first Lutheran passion historia (c. 1530) but has more elaborate choral numbers.

== Works ==
- St Matthew Passion
- Sacrae aliquot cantiones latinae et germanicae, quinqué et quatuor vocum Frankfurt 1575
