= Gioseppe Caimo =

Italian composer

Gioseppe Caimo (also Giuseppe) (c. 1545 – between September 6, 1584 and October 31, 1584) was an Italian composer and organist of the Renaissance, mainly active in Milan. He was a prolific composer of madrigals and other secular vocal music, and was one of the most prominent musicians in Milan in the 1570s and early 1580s.

== Life ==
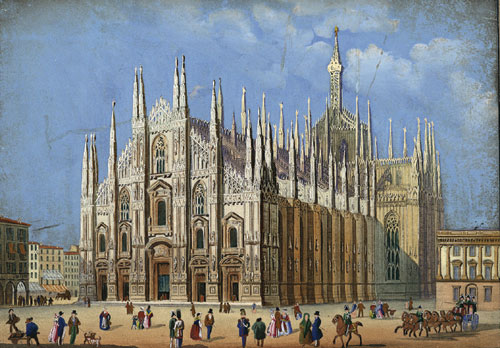
The Duomo di Milano in 1856. Caimo was organist here between 1580 and 1584.

He was born in Milan. No biographical details about his early life are known, but he was evidently a precocious composer, for his first publication was a book of four voice madrigals in 1564, written when he was probably in his late teens, and one of his compositions was probably performed for Emperor Maximilian when he was in Milan in 1563. This piece, Alli figliuoli del Sereniss. Re Massimigliano d'Austria Eccelsa e generosa prole degna, No. 5 in his 1564 publication, is taken by Alfred Einstein as evidence he was already renowned in his home city at this young age. Einstein called it "a fine, sonorous music to be played in the open."

Caimo was organist at the church of San Ambrogio Maggiore in Milan from 1564, as indicated on the title page of his madrigal book of that year, probably until 1580 when he became the organist at Milan Cathedral. During the 1570s he acquired a connection with Wilhelm V's ducal court in Bavaria, which had one of the most distinguished musical establishments north of the Alps, but they never succeeded in persuading Caimo to leave Milan. Caimo died young and evidently suddenly: Pietro Tini, the publisher of Caimo's second book of canzonettas (Venice, 1584) wrote that it was an "acerba et impensata morte" (bitter and unexpected death).

== Music and influence ==
Caimo published four books of music which have survived, and six which are lost. The four surviving collections are two books of madrigals, for four and five voices respectively (Milan, 1564 and Venice, 1584), a book of Neapolitan canzoni (villanelle) for three voices (Milan, 1566), and a second book of canzonette, this one for four voices (Venice, 1584). The lost publications include madrigals, canzonette and motets, published in Brescia and Venice.

His style represents the shift from the popular villanella for three voices to the later canzonetta which was much like a madrigal. His early music shows the influence of the French chanson, as well as the native tradition of popular song. Musically, his canzonettas are light, graceful, and unpretentious; Einstein said that he is "fresher and more naive than the poets whose texts he uses." Other music of his is more adventurous, such as three chromatic madrigals in terza rima, referred to by musicologist Iain Fenlon as "gloomy ... [and] entirely appropriate texts for a city suffering from exorbitant taxation, economic depression and violence caused by Spanish oppression."

Caimo's chromaticism is most extreme in his fourth book of madrigals, which was for five voices and published the year of his death (1584). He includes passages with chromatic mediants – chords with roots a third apart – as well as circle-of-fifths passages that reach harmonically remote regions, such as G-flat, something done rarely even during this experimental time, the decades prior to the development of functional tonality.

Other composers who influenced Caimo included Vincenzo Ruffo and Nicola Vicentino. Ruffo was one of the most prominent of the northern Italian musicians who followed the suggested reforms of the Council of Trent, and Nicola Vicentino was one of the most experimental musicians and music theorists of mid-century. Caimo himself seems to have had little influence outside of Milan, with his name only appearing a handful of times in literature of the era. Milan, under Spanish rule during Caimo's time, was not the musical center it had been under the Sforza dynasty a century earlier, having lost its place to Venice as the musical center of northern Italy.
