= Giovanni Domenico da Nola =

Italian composer

- Born: c. 1510–c. 1520; Nola, Kingdom of Naples
- Died: May 1592; Naples, Kingdom of Naples
- Occupations: Composer, poet
- Era: Renaissance
- Known for: Canzoni villanesche, madrigals
- Notable work: Canzoni villanesche (1541), Madrigali (1545)

Giovanni Domenico da Nola (also Nolla) (c. 1510–1520 – May 1592) was an Italian composer and poet of the Renaissance.

He was born in the town of Nola, Italy. He was a founding member of the Accademia dei Sereni in 1546–1547, where he knew Luigi Dentice and Marchese della Terza, who was a patron of Orlando di Lasso. Nola was appointed maestro di cappella at the SS Annunziata in Naples on 1 February 1563, a position he held up to his death 29 years later. He also taught singing to the women of the ospedali at the Annunziata and to seminary deacons.

Nola's first publication consisted of two books of Canzoni villanesche in 1541, which contained 31 villanescas and 11 mascheratas. They were held in high esteem by Nola's contemporaries; arrangements of these works were made by Lasso, Hubert Waelrant, Adrian Willaert, Baldassare Donato, Perissone Cambio, and Antonio Scandello. Lyrically, the works are often humorous and draw on local dialects and sayings; musically, the works make skillful use of imitation and intentional parallel fifths.

Nola published a book of madrigals in 1545; of the 29 works in the book, 22 are settings of Petrarch, including one madrigal, six canzoni and fifteen sonnets. The works show a balance of imitative and homophonic textures, and make use of strategic accidentals to heighten musical tension. Nola often uses the note nere style common in his day. He later published a second book of madrigals for five voices; two further books of madrigals have been lost. Nola also contributed madrigals to anthologies, and some of his poems were published without music.

The entire corpus of Nola's surviving works was edited by L. Cammarota and published in 1973.

== Works ==
Sacred

- Liber primus motectorum (Venice, 1549, 5 voices) – survives incomplete
- Cantiones vulgo motecta appellatae (Venice, 1575, 6 voices) – lost

Secular

- Canzoni villanesche (Venice, 1541) – only surviving copy in a Polish library
- Madrigali (Venice, 1545, 4 voices)
- Il secondo libro de madrigali (Rome, 1564, 5 voices) – survives incomplete
- Il primo libro delle villanelle alla napolitana (Venice, 1567, 3 and 4 voices)
- Il quarto libro di madrigali (5 and 6 voices) – lost
- 5 napolitane, three intabulated for lute
- 15 madrigals published or copied elsewhere
