= Villanella =

Form of light Neapolitan secular vocal music

In music, a villanella (Italian pronunciation: [villaˈnɛlla]; plural villanelle) is a form of light Neapolitan secular vocal music which originated in the Kingdom of Naples just before the middle of the 16th century. It first appeared in Naples, and influenced the later canzonetta, and from there also influenced the madrigal.

The subject matter is generally rustic, comic, and often satirical; frequently the mannerisms of art music, such as the madrigal, are a subject of parody. The rhyme scheme of the verse in the earlier Neapolitan forms of the villanelle is usually abR abR abR ccR, where "R" is a refrain repeated exactly. The villanella became one of the most popular forms of song in Italy around mid-century.

The music of the early villanella (known as the canzone villanesca) is invariably for three unaccompanied voices. The first composers of villanelle were the Neapolitans Giovanni Domenico da Nola and Giovan Tomaso di Maio; later composers, no longer from Naples, included Adrian Willaert, Luca Marenzio, Adriano Banchieri, Orlande de Lassus, and others.

== See also ==
- Air de cour
- La Pléiade
