= Hernando de Cabezón =

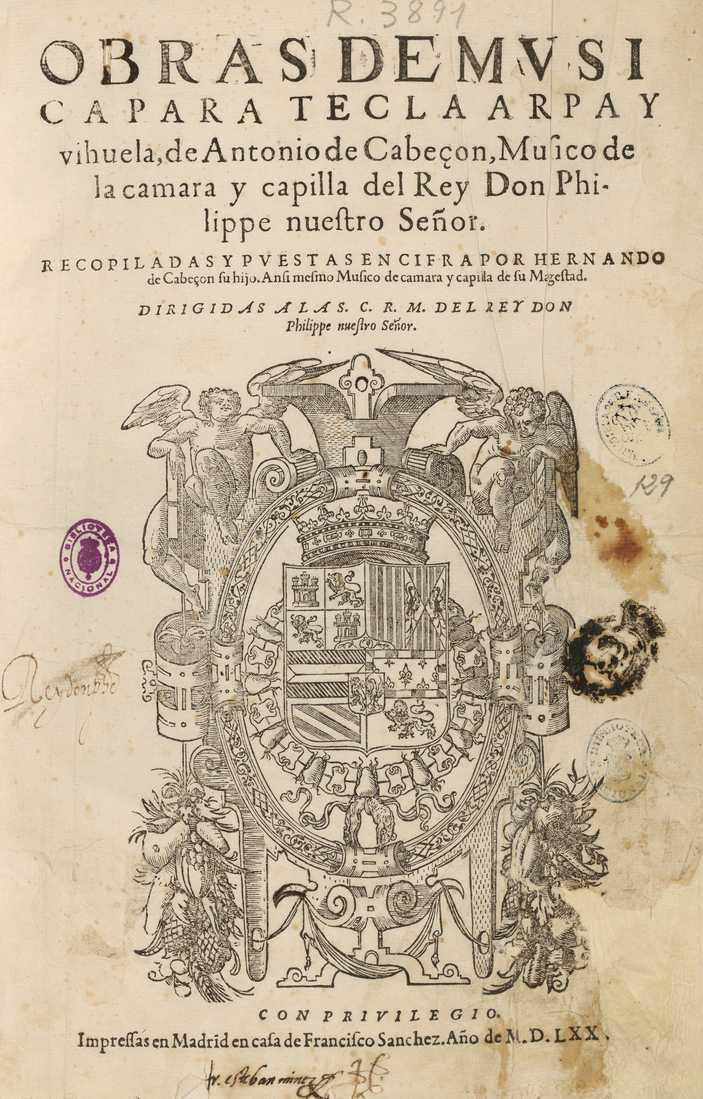
Las obras de música para tecla, arpa y vihuela de Antonio de Cabezón, published in 1578 by his son Hernando de Cabezón

Hernando de Cabezón, (baptized 7 September 1541 – 1 October 1602) was a Spanish composer and organist, son of Antonio de Cabezón. Only a few of his works are extant today, and he is chiefly remembered for publishing the bulk of his father's work.

== Biography ==
He was born in Madrid and probably studied music with his father. From January to December 1559 he was employed at the royal chapel, where his father worked, as a substitute organist. He was appointed organist of the Sigüenza Cathedral in 1563, and when his father died in 1566, he succeeded him as royal organist. Like his father, he accompanied the court on its travels; this brought him to Portugal, among other places, where he lived in 1580–1581. In 1598, when Philip II of Spain died, Cabezón went on as royal organist with his son Philip III of Spain. He drafted his will in 1598 and died four years later in Valladolid.

Only a few of Cabezón's compositions survive. He is chiefly remembered for Obras de música para tecla, arpa y vihuela (Madrid, 1578), a large collection of music by his father (also including five pieces by Hernando). The Obras constitute the single most important source for Antonio de Cabezón's work. Hernando's own works include an organ setting of Ave maris stella and several keyboard intabulations. All of these pieces are of very high quality, and the intabulations are notable for their rather radical departures from the vocal originals.
