= Giovanni Battista Pinello di Ghirardi =

Italian composer

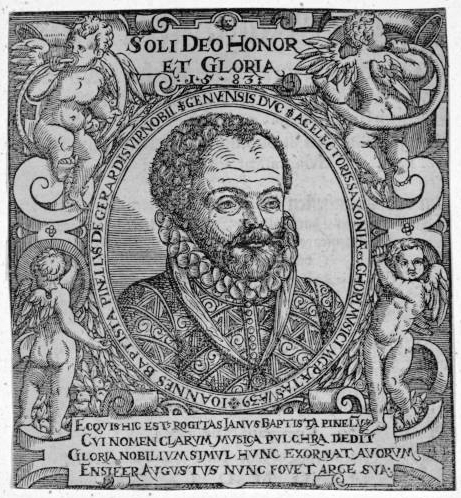
Giovanni Battista Pinello di Ghirardi

Giovanni Battista Pinello di Ghirardi (c. 1544 – 15 June 1587 in Prague) was an Italian music composer and Kapellmeister of the Italian Renaissance.

== Life and career ==
Giovanni Battista Pinello was born in Genoa in c. 1544. He came from a noble Genoese family. The earliest known record of Pinello dates to 1569 when he was serving as a musician in Landshut in the chapel of William V, Duke of Bavaria. Financial woes in the Bavarian court, caused that chapel to close in 1570 and at this point Pinello returned to Italy. He settled in maestro di cappella at the Vicenza Cathedral. He remained in that post for several years during which time his first compositions were published in Venice. These included three "Neapolitan song" anthologies: Il secondo libro delle canzone napolitane (1571), Il terzo libro delle canzone napolitane (1572), and El quarto libro delle canzone napolitane (1575).

By 1576 (possibly earlier) Pinello had left his post at the Vicenza Cathedral and was working as a singer at the Court Church in Innsbruck in the service of the House of Habsburg. By 1580 (possibly earlier) he had left that post and was in Prague where he was a singer in the court of Rudolf II, Holy Roman Emperor. He was appointed Kapellmeister of the Staatskapelle Dresden in November 1580; succeeding Antonio Scandello after the post was turned down by first Orlando di Lasso and then Jacob Regnart. His work in the Dresden Court made him one of the composers who brought the Italian style into the German-speaking world.

While his time in Dresden was positively marked by a prolific compositional output, this was a difficult period for Pinello who had difficulty assimilating into the Dresden court. Vice-Kapellmeister, Georg Forster, who had previously served as interim Kapellmeister before Pinello arrived, did not get along with Pinello and made his life difficult. Likewise, the choir was equally mutinous, possibly in loyalty to Forster due to the unpopularity of appointing a foreigner to the post of Kapellmeister. Additionally, it is speculated that Pinello may have been a spy for Rudolf II and this could have contributed to his negative position in the Dresden court. Ultimately his unpopularity at court led to his dismissal in 1584.

Pinello returned to Prague where he served the court as Knabenpräceptor from 1584 until his death on June 15, 1587.

Johann Gottfried Walther mentioned in his Musicalisches Lexicon published in 1732 the following compositions by Pinello:

== Compositions ==
- A four-part mass (1583)
- Ein deutsches Magnificat in den acht Kirchentönen (1584) – a German Magnificat in the eight church tones *Cantiones Sacrae and madrigals for eight, ten and fifteen voices (Dresden, 1584)
- Neue deutsche Lieder zu fünf Stimmen (Dresden, 1585) – New German songs to five voices held in the style of the Neapolitan villanella transferred from the Italian
- Napolitane a cinque voci (Dresden, 1585) – in five voices
- Motetii quinque vocum (1588)
- 18 five-part Motets (Prague 1588)
