= Paolo Aretino =

Italian composer

Paolo Aretino (1508–1584) or Paolo Antonio del Bivi was a Renaissance era composer from Arezzo principally known for his sacred music, whose surviving works include two books of madrigals, a book of hymns, a book of settings of the Magnificat, and three books dedicated to Holy Week. He was choirmaster of Arezzo Cathedral, and canon and head of music at S. Maria della Pieve in Arezzo. He also wrote profane works, publishing two books of madrigals, and was reported to have set sestinas by Petrarch.

== Works ==
Works include:

- Libro primo della madrigali cromati a 4
- Deh dolce pastorella (no. 29)
- Lamentationii

== Selected recordings ==
- Paolo Aretino: Sabbato Sancto - Lamentationes et Responsoria Odhecaton (early music ensemble), Paolo da Col, Arcana 2023
