= Ludovico Balbi =

Italian composer

Ludovico Balbi (c. 1545 – 1604) was a Venetian singer and composer, and conductor. He was a pupil of Costanzo Porta and a choirmaster at Padua. Among his compositions are masses, motets, canzoni, madrigals, and others. Surviving compositions date as early as 1570.

== Biography ==
Balbi was born in Venice around 1545. In 1565, he became a student of the great Italian composer Costanzo Porta. From 1570 to 1578, Balbi sang at St. Mark's Cathedral and was appointed maestro di cappella at the monastery S. Maria Glorioso del Frari. In 1582, Balbi declined an offer to be maestro at Milan Cathedral and instead referred one of his underlings, offending some high-ranking officials of the Roman Church. In 1585, Balbi accepted an offer to be maestro of the Cappella Anotoniana in Padua, although he wished to be maestro of Padua Cathedral. After moving to Feltre Cathedral in 1593 and later Treviso Cathedral, he returned to S. Maria Glorioso del Frari until his death in 1604.
