= Antonio Gardano =

Italian composer

Antonio Gardano (also Antoine Gardane) (1509 – 28 October 1569) was a French-born Italian composer and important music publisher and printer based in Venice.

== Life and career ==
Gardano arrived in the city as a "musico francese" whose musical compositions had been published in Lyons by Jacques Moderne from 1532. Gardano set up a publishing house and between 1538 and 1569 published 450 editions of prominent composers, half of them Italian madrigals.

The composers best-represented in Gardano's output included Jacques Arcadelt, Cipriano de Rore, Orlande de Lassus, and Adrian Willaert, accounting for about 25 percent of his total publications. Gardano and Girolamo Scotto, owner of the other large Venetian publishing house in the middle of the 16th century, held an effective monopoly on publishing in Italy for several decades. While the house of Scotto published volumes on law, medicine, philosophy, and theology in addition to music, Gardano published only music.

After his death, his sons Alessandro and Angelo carried on with the activity of the Gardano publishing house, producing more than 1000 more editions of music.

== Works ==
Intabolatura Nova di Balli, a representative collection of 25 pieces published in 1551, includes the preface "dances of various kinds, to be played on the arpicordo, harpsichord, spinet or clavichord, by divers and most excellent composers," but lacks attributions. The collection contains many of the popular dance forms of the day, including galliards, pavanes and passamezzi. The original print is held by the Civico Museo Bibliografico Musicale in Bologna.
