= Giammateo Asola =

Italian composer

Giammateo Asola (also spelled Gian Matteo, Giovanni Matteo; Asula, Asulae; 1532 or earlier – 1 October 1609) was an Italian composer of the late Renaissance. He was a prolific composer of sacred music, mostly in a conservative style, although he may have been one of the first composers to write a part for basso continuo.

== Life ==
He was born in Verona, and began studying at San Giorgio in Alga in 1546 in the congregation of secular canons. While in Verona he most likely studied with Vincenzo Ruffo. In 1569 he became a secular parish priest, and in 1577 became maestro di cappella at Treviso Cathedral; however, in 1578 he went to Vicenza Cathedral to take the equivalent job there, where the pay and musical opportunities were greater. He only stayed there four years, going to Venice in 1582, which was the center of activity in northern Italy for sacred music. Except for a short return to Verona c. 1590–1591, he lived in Venice until his death, working at the church of S Severo, as one of four chaplains; apparently he was never associated with St. Mark's.

== Music and influence ==
Asola was a rare case of a composer working in Venice who showed almost no stylistic influence from the Venetian school; indeed most of his works are in the Palestrina style, the idiom of the Roman School of composers. In his later works he began using a basso continuo, and he may have been one of the first composers to do so. The only musical feature he borrowed from the Venetian composers elsewhere in his adopted city was the idea of cori spezzati, spatially separated groups of singers; however, this musical style was widespread in northern Italy by the time he was writing, and by no means unique to Venice. Cori spezzati techniques appear in particular in his 1588 publication of masses for eight voices.

Among his copious works are many masses, including a Requiem mass; psalm settings, lamentations, vespers, antiphons, sacrae cantiones, and numerous other sacred works. He also composed secular music, including several books of madrigals, as well as one book of madrigali spirituali, which is lost.

One of his books of madrigals, the Madrigali, is unusual in that it consists of canons for two voices only; most madrigals of the time were for at least four voices, and rarely used strict counterpoint.

== References and further reading ==
- Fouse, Donald (1980). "Asola, Giammateo". In Sadie, Stanley (ed.). The New Grove Dictionary of Music and Musicians. Vol. i (1st ed.). London: Macmillan. pp. 657–658.
- Fouse, Donald. "Asola, Giammateo", Grove Music Online, ed. L. Macy (accessed January 15, 2005), grovemusic.com (subscription access).
- Gustave Reese, Music in the Renaissance. New York, W.W. Norton & Co., 1954. ISBN 0-393-09530-4.
