= Philippe de Monte =

Flemish Renaissance composer (1521–1603)

Phillipe de Monte
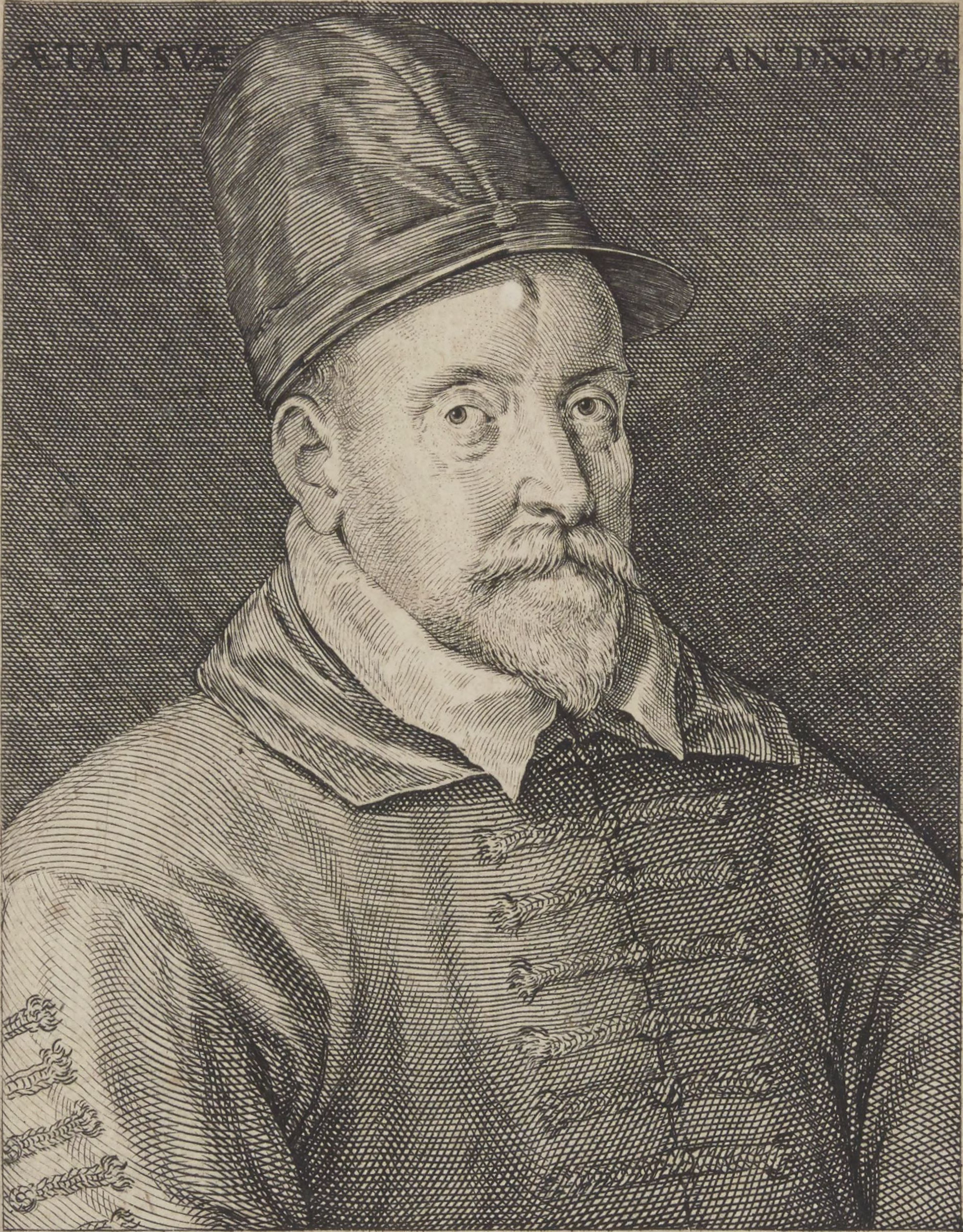
- Monte in 1594 (aged 73)
- Born: 1521; Mechelen, Habsburg Netherlands
- Died: 4 July 1603 (aged 81–82); Prague, Kingdom of Bohemia, Holy Roman Empire

Philippe de Monte (1521 – 4 July 1603), sometimes known as Philippus de Monte, was a Flemish composer of the late Renaissance active all over Europe. He was a member of the 3rd generation madrigalists and wrote more madrigals than any other composer of the time. Sources cite him as being "the best composer in the entire country, particularly in the new manner and musica reservata." Others compare his collections of music with that of other influential composers, such as Orlande de Lassus.

== Life and career ==
Philippe de Monte was born in Mechelen around 1521. After boyhood musical training at St. Rumbolds Cathedral in Mechelen, where he was a choirboy, Monte went to Italy — a common destination for a young Flemish composer in the sixteenth century – where he made a name for himself as a composer, singer, and teacher. He lived and worked in Naples for a while, and in Rome, in the employ of Cardinal Orsini, although he was in England for a brief period, 1554–1555, during the reign of Queen Mary I, while she was married to King Philip II of Spain. Monte reported that he disliked working in Philip's choir since all the other members were Spaniards. While in England, Monte was acquainted with the then-young William Byrd.

"Though Monte was not likely to have been a supporter of the Reformation, he took part in a variety of intellectual exchanges on sensitive topics, some of which involved Italian academics."

In 1568 Monte was appointed as successor to Jacobus Vaet as Kapellmeister to the court of Maximilian II in Vienna. A majority of his music was published in Venice under the direction of Gardano, Monte's exclusive publisher in Italy. He wanted to utilize Italian publishers in order to stay close to the home of the madrigal. He was successful at recruiting new musicians to the chapel, for Lassus himself noted the astonishing quality of music-making in Vienna just two years after Monte became leader there. During his first ten years at the Imperial Court, Monte served as an active teacher. Monte worked for the remainder of his long life in Habsburg courts both in Vienna and, since 1583, Prague. Even though his accomplishments were many, he is not known to have held any positions as a church musician or in a noble household. Philippe de Monte died in Prague in 1603.

== Music and influence ==
Monte was a hugely prolific composer, and wrote both sacred and secular music, primarily printed in the German language. He wrote about 40 masses and about 260 other sacred pieces, including motets and madrigali spirituali (works differing only from madrigals in that they have sacred texts). He published over 1100 secular madrigals, in 34 books, but not all of them survived. His first publication was in 1554 when he was 33. Most of his publications, from then on, included self-written prefaces that were primarily utilized to express his gratitude to patrons of financial support.

Monte's madrigals have been referred to as "the first and most mature fruits of the compositions for five voices." Stylistically, Monte's madrigals vary from an early, very progressive style with frequent use of chromaticism to express the text (though he was not quite as experimental in this regard as Marenzio or Lassus), to a late style which is much simplified, featuring short motifs and frequent homophonic textures. Some of his favorite poets of the time included Petrarch, Bembo, and Sannazaro. Unlike Monteverdi, who began in a conservative style and became experimental later in life, Monte's compositional career had an opposite curve, progressing from experimentation to unity and simplicity in his later works. Some believe that this comes from his change in poetry selections, whereas others believe it was a reflection from the imperial courts.

Philippe de Monte was renowned all over Europe; editions of his music were printed, reprinted, and widely circulated. He has been described as "a quiet, unassuming man, gentle as a girl." He had many students, including Gian Vincenzo Pinelli from Padua, thereby passing on his compositional skills and experience to the generation who developed the early Baroque style. Believed to be one of the most prominent composers, Philippe de Monte's madrigals are still performed today.

== Recordings ==
- Alexander Utendal & Philippus de Monte, Motets, Capilla Flamenca and Oltremontano, 2002 (Passacaille 937).
- Philippe de Monte: Missa Ultimi miei sospiri, and other sacred music, Cinquecento, 2008 (Hyperion CDA 67658).
- Praga magna incl. Missa super Confitebor tibi Domine and motet Langue a´ll vostro languir by Philippe de Monte, Cappella Mariana, Vojtěch Semerád 2014 (Artevisio0).
- Recordings of masses by Phillipe de Monte for Convivium Records have been featured by the luminatus vocal ensemble
