= Bad Colberg-Heldburg =

- Town
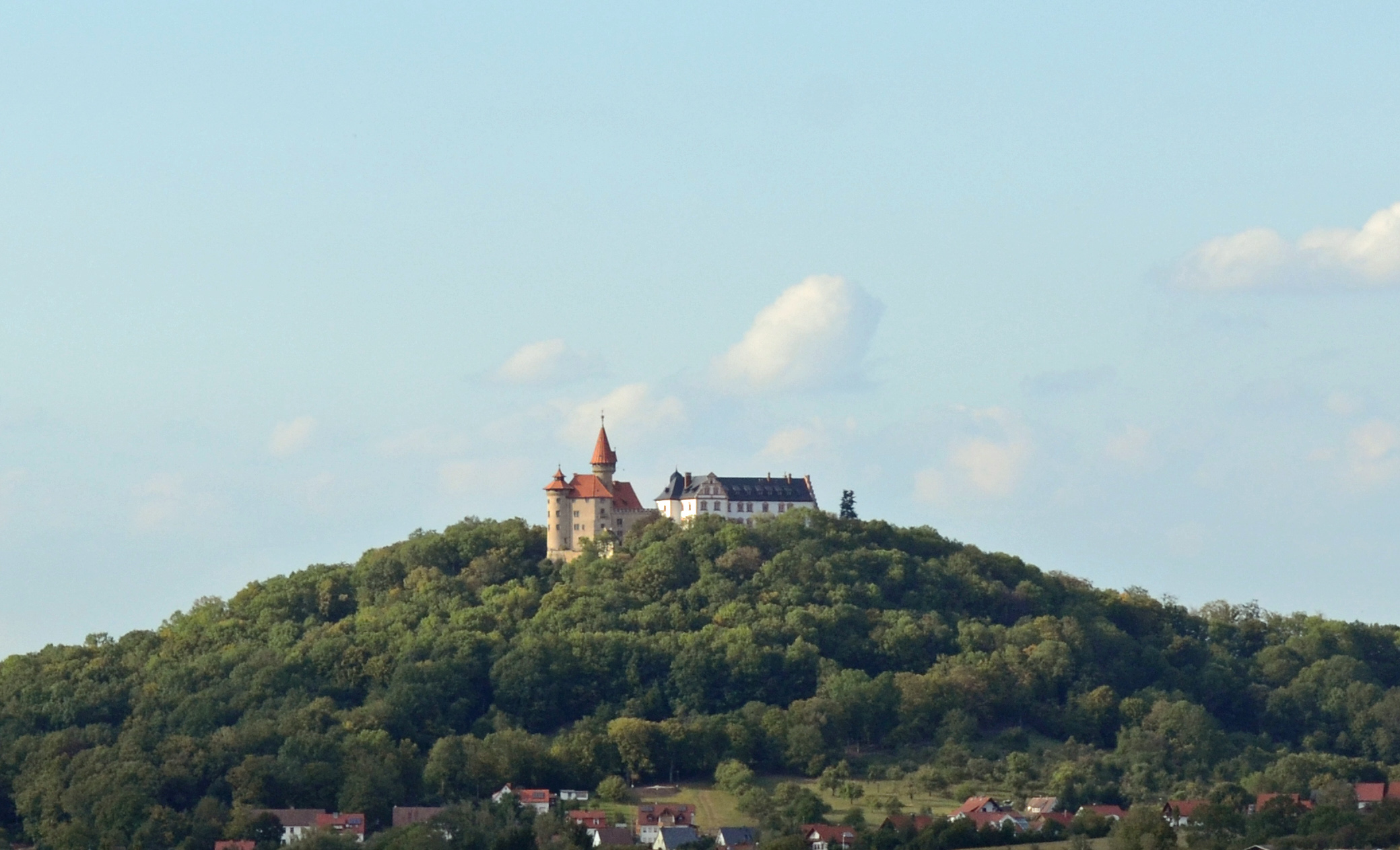
- The fortress of Heldburg dominates the area

- Coat of arms
- Interactive map of Bad Colberg-Heldburg
- Location within Germany Location within Thuringia
- Coordinates: 50°16′50″N 10°43′31″E
- Country: Germany
- State: Thuringia
- District: Hildburghausen
- Disbanded: 2019
- Subdivisions: 7

Area
  - Total: 53.39 km^{2} (20.61 sq mi)
- Elevation: 299 m (981 ft)

Population (2017-12-31)
  - Total: 2,045
  - Density: 38.30/km^{2} (99.20/sq mi)
- Time zone: UTC+01:00 (CET)
  - Summer (DST): UTC+02:00 (CEST)
- Postal codes: 98663
- Dialling codes: 036871
- Vehicle registration: HBN

Bad Colberg-Heldburg (German: [baːt ˈkɔlbɛʁk ˈhɛltbʊʁk]) is a former municipality in the region Heldburger Land in the district of Hildburghausen, in Thuringia, Germany. It is situated 16 km south of Hildburghausen, and 18 km west of Coburg. It was created in 1993 by the merger of the former municipalities of Bad Colberg, Gellershausen, Heldburg, Holzhausen, Lindenau and Völkershausen. Since 1 January 2019, it is part of the town Heldburg.

== Heldburg history ==
First Heldburg was called in the issued 837, October 17 certificate no. 507 of the Code Eberhardi. Sigibald, executor of Count Asis, rendered in goods in Heldburg and other places to the monastery of Fulda. Heldburg received city status on 2 December 1394, the Council's 1396 witnessed and held the low courts to a limited extent. In the 16th century Heldburg was attached. The City Church "Unserer lieben Frau" stood in the Middle Ages the country chapter Coburg the diocese Würzburg. The castle Veste Heldburg was first mentioned in 1317 as a possession of the Counts of Henneberg. It became a territory in 1353 of the Burgraves of Nuremberg and in 1374 became part of the Wettin family holdings.

== Culture ==
Northeast of the town is the Veste Heldburg in which the German Castle Museum (Deutsches Burgenmuseum). After years of renovation and construction of the fortress, the museum was opened on September 8, 2016, the Thuringian Minister President. The museum includes 40 rooms, which were concerned with the meaning and function of castles. In addition to their structural development and life on castles, represented both in peace and in times of war. Also worth seeing is the old town with its restored half-timbered buildings from the early modern period. It is surrounded by a city wall from the 16th century. Get in addition to wall sections five of the original 14 towers and the Untertor as one of the former four city gates. The Protestant church of Our Lady (Unserer lieben Frauen)(Johann Gerhard in 1606 became general superintendent of the duchy for 9 years), on the west side of the square dates from the period 1502–1537, the tower is older. The Town Hall is a half-timbered building with skylights and is located on the market in the city center.

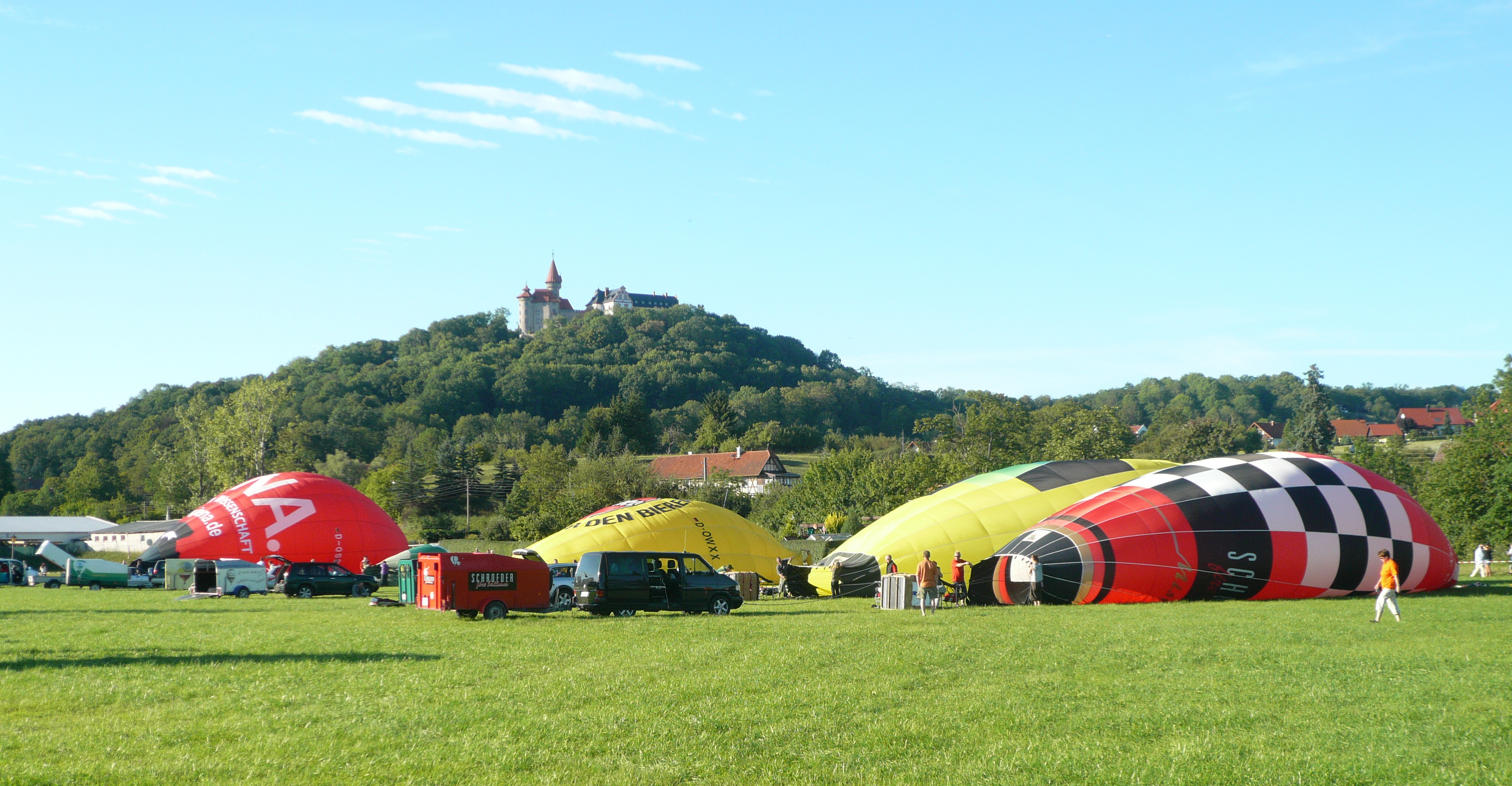
17th Thuringian Montgolfiade in August 2011

Heldburg is home to the Thüringer Montgolfiade, a famous hot air balloon festival.

== Personalities ==
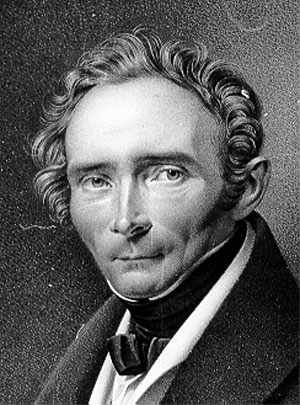
Johann Wilhelm Wagner

- Eucharius Hoffmann (1540-1588), composer, organist, choir director, music documentaries, born in Heldburg
- Johann Gerhard (1582-1637), an important representative of Lutheran orthodoxy, Superintendent in Heldburg (1606-1615), general superintendent in Coburg, teacher at the Gymnasium Casimirianum in Coburg, professor in Jena, author
- Johann Christian Thomae (1668-1724), rector, author, born in Heldburg
- Johann Wilhelm Wagner (1681-1745), astronomer, born in Heldburg
