= Johann Leibe =

Johannes Leib ("Janus Leibius" 28 April 1591 – 15 March 1666) was a German physician, lawyer, poet and lyricist.

== Life ==
Leib was born in Streufdorf, then a small town in a part of rural Thuringia otherwise known to historians of the period for its relatively high level of recorded witch trials. His father was a lawyer and civic leader in the municipality.

He began his studies at schools in Heldburg, Schleusingen (1608) and Gotha (1610) before moving on the universities of Jena (1612), Altdorf (1615) and Ingolstadt before returning in 1617 to Altdorf. In 1619, his studies evidently completed, he returned to Coburg and began working as a physician and advocate. Despite the medical focus, sources indicate that his university level studies had been concerned chiefly with Law. While still at Altdorf, probably 1616, he was "crowned" a poet laurate.

== Output ==
Leib published various tracts and pamphlets reflecting the range of his education and interests. Those mentioned in the sources include:

- "Tractat von Ganerben" (concerning a form of joint property ownership)
- "De prioritate creditorum" (apparently concerning the relative rights of different classes of creditor)
- "Zodiacus Christianus" ("The Christian Zodiac")
- "De Praedestinatione ad vitam aeternam " ("Predestination to Eternal Life")

His publications as a poet include:

- "Epigrammata de laudibus et laboribus Gustavi Adolphi R. Sueciae" (Epigrams in praise of the Swedish warrior-king Gustaavus Adolphus
- "Nun danket alle Gott für seine große Gnade" ("Now thank we all our God for his Great Mercy"' – a hymn of praise for the ending of the Thirty Years' War, which found its way into several contemporary hymnals)

Leib also took an interest in German proverbs, which is reflected in his 1627 book "Studentica Hoc est: Apophthegmata, symbola, et proverbia … germanico-latino-italica". The value of this compilation lies not just in the proverbs, mottoes and inscriptions that it lists, taken from usage in Saxony but from insights included in it on the usages of popes, emperors and kings.
