= 1579 in music =

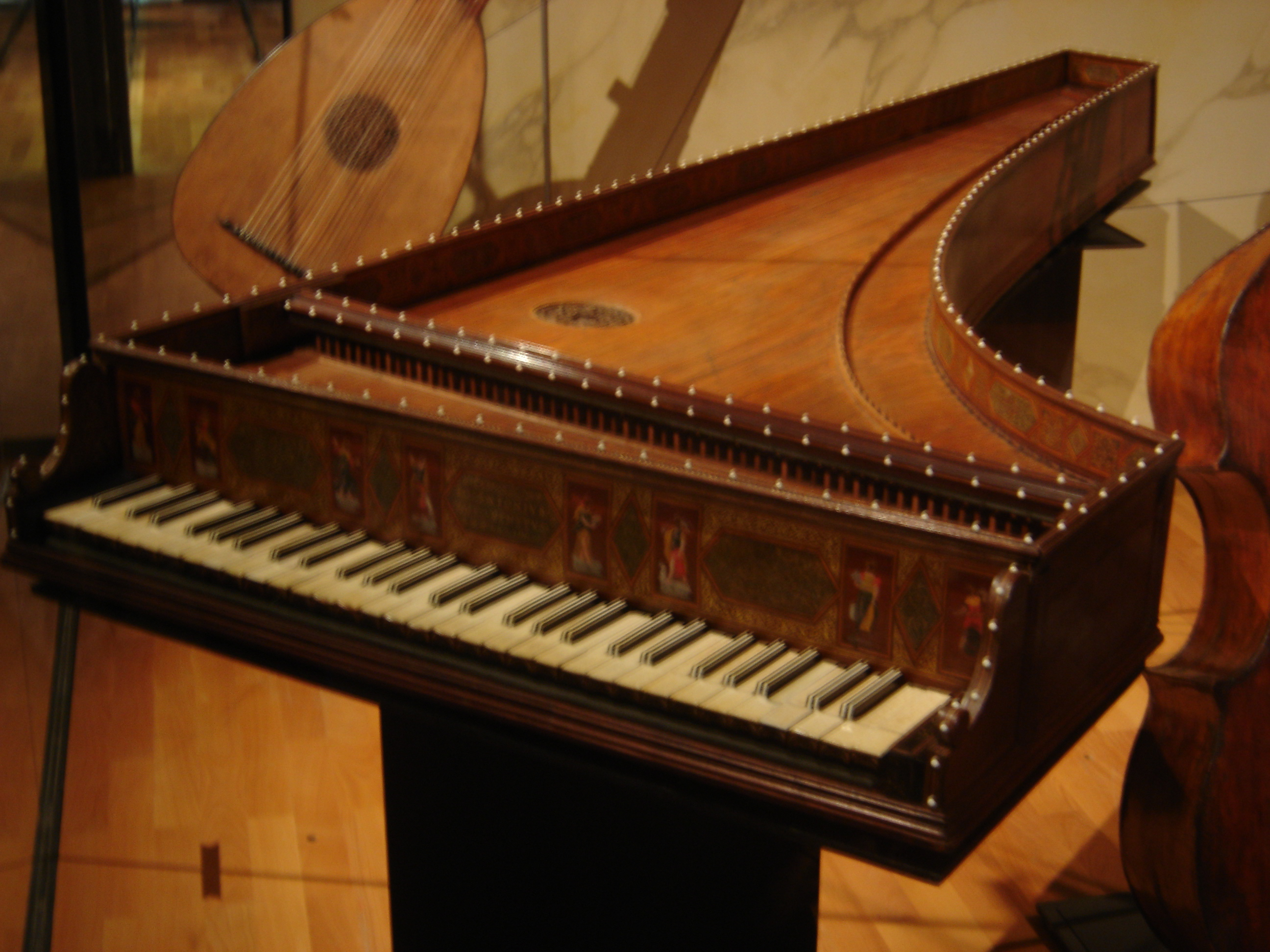
Clavecin from 1579

== Publications ==
- Costanzo Antegnati – First book of masses for four voices (Brescia: Vincenzo Sabbio)
- Ippolito Baccusi
  - First book of motets, for five, six, and eight voices (Venice: Francesco Rampazatto)
  - Third book of madrigals for six voices (Venice: Angelo Gardano)
- Joachim a Burck (March 21) – Ein christlich Lied... (Mühlhausen: George Hantzsch)
- Johannes de Cleve – Cantiones seu harmoniae sacrae for four, five, six, seven, eight, and ten voices (Augsburg: Philipp Ulhard & Andreas Reinheckel)
- Nicolao Dorati – First book of madrigals for six voices (Venice: Angelo Gardano)
- Giovanni Dragoni – Third book of madrigals for five voices (Venice: heirs of Girolamo Scotto)
- Placido Falconio – Psalmodia vespertina for four voices (Brescia: Vincenzo Sabbio)
- Stefano Felis – First book of madrigals for six voices (Venice: Angelo Gardano)
- Eucharius Hoffmann – Vyff geistlike olde Ostergesenge for four voices (Rostock: Augustin Ferber)
- Fernando de las Infantas
  - Sacrarum varii styli cantionum tituli Spiritus sancti, book three, for six voices (Venice: heirs of Girolamo Scotto)
  - Plura modulationum genera (Venice: Girolamo Scotto), a book of counterpoint exercises
- Marc'Antonio Ingegneri – Second book of madrigals for four voices (Venice: Angelo Gardano)
- Ondřej Chrysoponus Jevíčský – Bicinia nova (Prague: Georg Nigrinus)
- Orlando di Lasso – Corona di Madrigali
- Giovanni de Macque – Madrigals for four, five, and six voices (Venice: Angelo Gardano)
- Claudio Merulo – First book of madrigals for four voices (Venice: Angelo Gardano)
- Philippe de Monte
  - Missa Benedicta es for six voices (Antwerp: Christophe Plantin)
  - Fifth book of motets for five voices (Venice: heirs of Girolamo Scotto)
- Benedetto Pallavicino – First book of madrigals for four voices (Venice: Angelo Gardano)

== Births ==
- date unknown – John Amner, composer and choirmaster at Ely Cathedral (died 1641)
- probable – Melchior Franck, composer (died 1639)

== Deaths ==
- date unknown – Miguel de Fuenllana, composer (born c.1500)
- probable – David Peebles, composer
