= Unterland =

Unterland may refer to:

- Unterland (electoral district), Liechtenstein
- Heldburger Unterland, Germany
- Lowland (National Council electoral district), electoral district for the National Council
- South Tyrolean Unterland, Italy
- Tyrolean Unterland, Austria
- Zürcher Unterland, Switzerland
