= Leitenhausen =

- Village
- Interactive map of Leitenhausen
- Location within Germany Location within Thuringia
- Coordinates: 50.3181°N 10.6094°E
- Country: Germany
- State: Thuringia
- District: Hildburghausen
- Founded: 1317
- Disbanded: 1972
- Time zone: UTC+01:00 (CET)
  - Summer (DST): UTC+02:00 (CEST)

Leitenhausen was a village in Germany, founded in 1317 A D. It was part of the former municipality Gompertshausen. It was destroyed by the East German authorities in 1972 as it stood too close to the Inner German border (part of the larger "Iron Curtain"), the border between the post-war states of East and West Germany. It lay in the extreme south of Thuringia in Heldburger Land in the district of Hildburghausen, only a few hundred metres away from the Thuringian-Bavarian border.

In 1970 the last family left the village. After that, in May 1972, all the houses were demolished and the land leveled. What remains is a plaque on the old village site.
