= Ummerstadt =

- Town
- Coat of arms

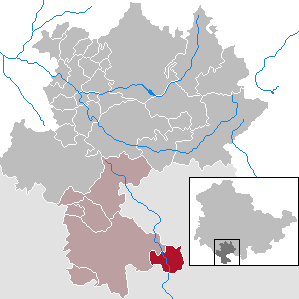
- Location of Ummerstadt within Hildburghausen district
- Interactive map of Ummerstadt
- Location within Germany Location within Thuringia
- Coordinates: 50°15′30″N 10°49′40″E
- Country: Germany
- State: Thuringia
- District: Hildburghausen
- Municipal assoc.: Heldburger Unterland

Government
  - Mayor (2022–28): Florian Lorz

Area
  - Total: 15.73 km^{2} (6.07 sq mi)
- Elevation: 281 m (922 ft)

Population (2025-12-31)
  - Total: 455
  - Density: 28.9/km^{2} (74.9/sq mi)
- Time zone: UTC+01:00 (CET)
  - Summer (DST): UTC+02:00 (CEST)
- Postal codes: 98663
- Dialling codes: 036871
- Vehicle registration: HBN
- Website: www.ummerstadt.de

Ummerstadt (German pronunciation: [ˈʊmɐˌʃtat]) is a town in the region Heldburger Land in district of Hildburghausen, in Thuringia, Germany. It is situated 19 km south of Hildburghausen, and 11 km west of Coburg.

== Sons and daughters of the town ==
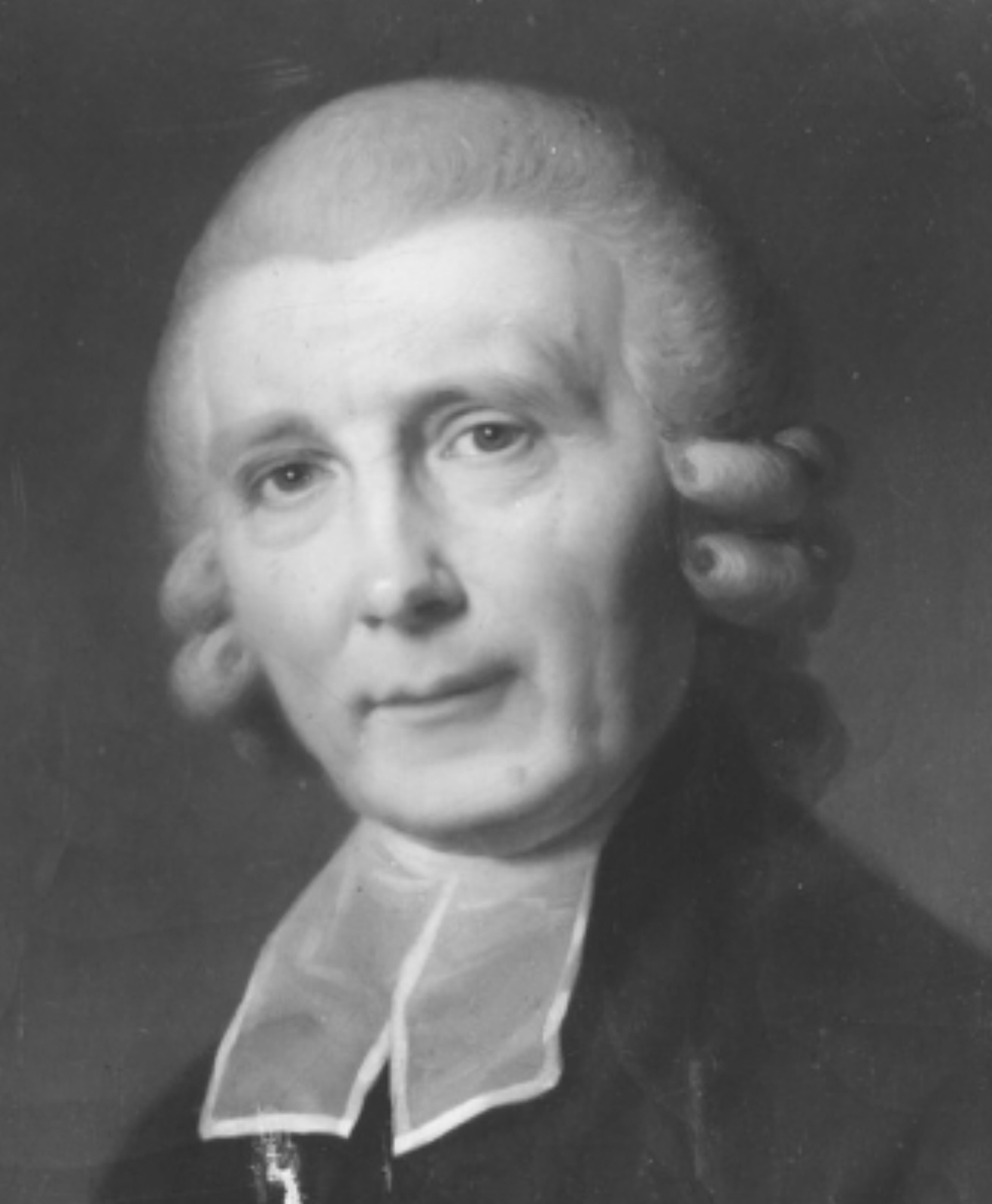
Johann Georg Rosenmüller 1802

- Johann Georg Rosenmüller (1736-1815), Superintendent of the Leipzig Thomaskirche
- Friedrich Konrad Müller (1823-1881), poet
- Erich Scharf (1908-1943), Communist worker, Thuringian Communist Party representative, protector and military service soldier.
