= Schweickershausen =

- Municipality
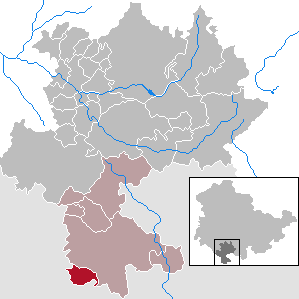
- Location of Schweickershausen within Hildburghausen district
- Interactive map of Schweickershausen
- Location within Germany Location within Thuringia
- Coordinates: 50°14′18″N 10°37′50″E
- Country: Germany
- State: Thuringia
- District: Hildburghausen
- Municipal assoc.: Heldburger Unterland

Government
  - Mayor (2020–26): Torsten Fischer

Area
  - Total: 9.75 km^{2} (3.76 sq mi)
- Elevation: 340 m (1,120 ft)

Population (2025-12-31)
  - Total: 168
  - Density: 17.2/km^{2} (44.6/sq mi)
- Time zone: UTC+01:00 (CET)
  - Summer (DST): UTC+02:00 (CEST)
- Postal codes: 98663
- Dialling codes: 036871
- Vehicle registration: HBN

Schweickershausen is a municipality in the region Heldburger Land in the district of Hildburghausen, in Thuringia, Germany.
