= 1577 in music =

== Events ==
- July – Annibale Zoilo resigns from the Sistine Chapel Choir, due to ill health.
- 25 October – Pope Gregory XIII appoints Giovanni Pierluigi da Palestrina and Annibale Zoilo to prepare a corrected edition of the Graduale Romanum.

== Publications ==
- Giovanni Animuccia – Third book of laudi (Rome: Antonio Blado), also includes "una instrutione per promovere e conservare il peccatore convertito" (an instruction for encouraging and retaining the converted sinner)
- Joachim a Burck – Lyricorum Ludovici Helmboldi Mulhusini, two volumes (of the lyrics of Ludwig Helmbold) (Mühlhausen: Georg Hantzsch), a collection of hymns
- Eucharius Hoffmann – 24 Cantiones for four, five, and six voices (Wittenberg: Johann Schwertel), a collection of motets
- Paolo Isnardi – Second book of madrigals for five voices (Venice: Angelo Gardano)
- Orlande de Lassus
  - Missae variis concentibus ornatae (Masses for various voices) (Paris: Le Roy & Ballard)
  - Novae aliquot (Several new pieces) for two voices (Munich: Adam Berg)
- Mattheus Le Maistre – Schöne und auserlesene Deudsche und Lateinische Geistliche Gesenge for three voices (Dresden: Gimel Bergen)
- Cristofano Malvezzi – First book of ricercars for four voices (Perugia: Pietroiacomo Petrucci)

== Classical music ==
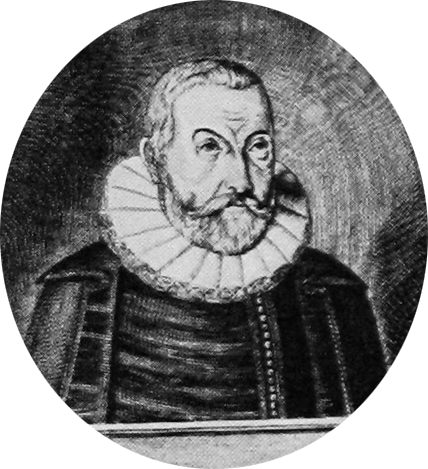
Johannes Eccard

- Johannes Eccard – Crepundia sacra Helmboldi

== Births ==
- probable – Robert Jones, English lutenist and composer (d. 1617)

== Deaths ==
- none listed
