= Schlechtsart =

- Municipality
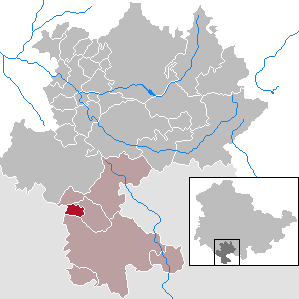
- Location of Schlechtsart within Hildburghausen district
- Interactive map of Schlechtsart
- Location within Germany Location within Thuringia
- Coordinates: 50°19′N 10°37′E
- Country: Germany
- State: Thuringia
- District: Hildburghausen
- Municipal assoc.: Heldburger Unterland

Government
  - Mayor (2022–28): René Braun

Area
  - Total: 4.57 km^{2} (1.76 sq mi)
- Elevation: 330 m (1,080 ft)

Population (2025-12-31)
  - Total: 122
  - Density: 26.7/km^{2} (69.1/sq mi)
- Time zone: UTC+01:00 (CET)
  - Summer (DST): UTC+02:00 (CEST)
- Postal codes: 98663
- Dialling codes: 036875
- Vehicle registration: HBN
- Website: www.heldburg.de

Schlechtsart is a municipality in the region Heldburger Land in the district of Hildburghausen, in Thuringia, Germany.
