= Gompertshausen =

- Ortsteil of Heldburg
- Coat of arms
- Interactive map of Gompertshausen
- Location within Germany Location within Thuringia
- Coordinates: 50°18′N 10°38′E
- Country: Germany
- State: Thuringia
- District: Hildburghausen
- Town: Heldburg

Area
  - Total: 14.81 km^{2} (5.72 sq mi)
- Elevation: 310 m (1,020 ft)

Population (2017-12-31)
  - Total: 434
  - Density: 29.3/km^{2} (75.9/sq mi)
- Time zone: UTC+01:00 (CET)
  - Summer (DST): UTC+02:00 (CEST)
- Postal codes: 98663
- Dialling codes: 036875
- Vehicle registration: HBN

Gompertshausen (German pronunciation: [ɡɔmpɐtsˈhaʊzn̩]) is a village and a former municipality in the region Heldburger Land in the district of Hildburghausen, in Thuringia, Germany. Since 1 January 2019, it has been part of the town of Heldburg.
