= Hellingen =

Village in Thuringia, Germany

- Ortsteil of Heldburg
- Coat of arms
- Interactive map of Hellingen
- Location within Germany Location within Thuringia
- Coordinates: 50°15′N 10°41′E
- Country: Germany
- State: Thuringia
- District: Hildburghausen
- Town: Heldburg

Area
  - Total: 44.55 km^{2} (17.20 sq mi)
- Elevation: 299 m (981 ft)

Population (2017-12-31)
  - Total: 991
  - Density: 22.2/km^{2} (57.6/sq mi)
- Time zone: UTC+01:00 (CET)
  - Summer (DST): UTC+02:00 (CEST)
- Postal codes: 98663
- Dialling codes: 036871

Hellingen (German pronunciation: [ˈhɛlɪŋən]) is a village and a former municipality in the region Heldburger Land in the district of Hildburghausen, in Thuringia, Germany. Since 1 January 2019, it is part of the town Heldburg. It was the southernmost municipality in Thuringia, and the second-southernmost in what was formerly East Germany (following Bad Brambach in Saxony).

== History ==
Within the German Empire (1871-1918), Hellingen was part of the Duchy of Saxe-Coburg and Gotha.

== Culture ==
Hellingen has got one of the last monuments dedicated to Lenin in Germany: a memorial stone placed in the Schiller Platz in 1970.
