= Josef Hechenberger =

Austrian politician (born 1974)

Member of the National Council
- Incumbent
- Assumed office 23 October 2019
- Constituency: Lowland

Personal details
- Born: 2 October 1974 (age 51)
- Party: People's Party

Josef Hechenberger (born 2 October 1974) is an Austrian politician of the People's Party serving as a member of the National Council since 2019. From 2004 to 2022, he was a city councillor of Reith im Alpbachtal.
