= Johann Christian Thomae =

German historian and clergyman

Johann Christian Thomae (5 April 1668 – 19 March 1724) was a German historian and biographer and a Lutheran rector of Neustadt bei Coburg.

== Life ==
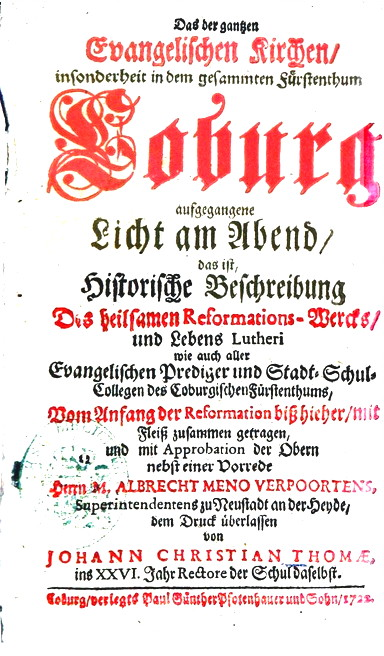
Titlepage of Licht am Abend, published in 1722

Thomae was born on 5 April 1668 at the house of his maternal grandfather, in Heldburg, Duchy of Saxe-Gotha-Altenburg. His father was Stephan Thomae, the Lutheran pastor of Wiesenfeld bei Coburg and later of Neuhaus (now Neuhaus-Schierschnitz) and Sonnefeld. His mother was Cordula Buchenröder, the daughter of a Church Superintendent Michael Buchenröder. Privately educated, Thomae came to Coburg in late May 1679 to join the Primary Class at the city's Collegiate School. In 1682, he was admitted to the Great Princely [Hochfürstliche] Gymnasium, also in Coburg, and graduated in 1686. From 1688 he studied at the University of Jena. After graduation, he worked as a teacher. In 1697, he was appointed as the Rector for the parish of Neustadt bei Coburg. Three years later, on 9 June 1700, he married Margaretha Dorothea Eyring (1675 – after 1715), the daughter of Johann Andreas Eyring, the Lutheran pastor of Fechheim, and his wife, Anna Ursula Brechtold. With her, Thomae had five children, two boys and three girls. In 1722 (ins XXVI. Jahr Rectore der Schul daselbst [“in his 26th year as the Rector of the School”]) he published in Coburg his history of the Reformation of the Duchy of Coburg. He died on 19 March 1724, in Neustadt bei Coburg.

== Works ==
- Kind-schuldiges Ehren-Gedächtnis, dem weiland Wohl Ehrwürdigen, Großachtbahrn, und in Gott andächtig Wohlgelehrten Herrn Stephano Thomae [A Repentant Son’s Memoir Honoring the Late, Most Venerable and Most Noble Servant of God Scholar, Mr. Stephan Thomae] (Coburg: Mönch, 1707).
- Den in der Augen der Welt unglück seelige, in Gottes Augen höchst=seel. Zustand eines truen Schulmanns [The in the Eyes of the World Tragically Dead, in the Eyes of God Most Blessed State of a True Schoolmaster], a pamphlet published in 1720 in the memory of the Lutheran Kirchner [ sacristan ] of Neustadt bei Coburg and the uncle of Thomae's wife, Rev. Georg Simon Eyring, who died in 1717.
- Das der gantzen Evangelischen Kirchen, insonderheit in dem gesammten Fürstenthum Coburg aufgegangene Licht am Abend / das ist, Historische Beschreibung des heilsamen Reformations-Wercks und Lebens Lutheri, wie auch aller evangelischen Prediger und Stadt-Schul-Collegen des Coburgischen Fürstenthums, vom Anfang der Reformation biß hieher [The Entire Evangelical Church, featuring the whole Principality of Coburg, [the] Rising Light in the Evening / That is, the Historical Description of the Beneficial Works and Life of Luther in the Reformation, as well as all Evangelical Preachers and Cities, Schools and Colleges of the Coburger Principality, from the Beginning to the Present ] (Coburg: Paul Günther Pfotenhauer und Sohn, 1722), popularly known as “Licht am Abend [Light in the Evening]”.

== Sources and references ==
- The source of most of the information about the life and writings of Rev. Thomae is his own biography in his book, Licht am Abend, pages 611 – 612.
- The source for the works listed is Licht am Abend, page 612

== Bibliography ==
- (in German) Thilo Krieg, “Johann Christian Thomæ: Geschichtsforscher und Biograph ( 1668 – 1724 ) [ Johann Christian Thomä, Historian and Biographer ( 1668 – 1724 ) ]”, in : Das geehrte und gelehrte Coburg. Ein lebensgeschichtliches Nachschlagebuch, Teil 1 [ The Esteemed and Learned Coburg. A Reference Book of History and Life, Part 1 ] ( Coburger Heimatkunde und Heimatgeschichte, Band 5 [ Local Customs and History of Coburg, Volume 5 ] ) ( Coburg: A. Roßteutscher, 1927), pp. 46 ff.
