= Friedrich Konrad Müller =

German poet (1823-1881)

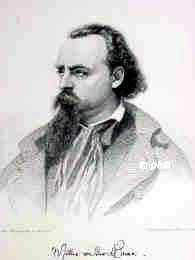
Old drawing of Müller von der Werra.

Friedrich Konrad Müller (born November 14, 1823 Ummerstadt; † 26 April 1881 in Leipzig) was a German poet, journalist and medical doctor. He called himself Müller von der Werra.

== Life ==
Müller was the son of a farmer. He became an apprentice pharmacist in Hildburghausen in and the mid-forties, he went to Heidelberg, where he met the poet Wilhelmine von Chézy, which supported him financially and encouraged his first works.

Because of his participation in the revolution of March 1848, he had to flee to Switzerland, and studied medicine in Zurich and Bern. Other cities were Geneva and St. Gallen. Then he returned to his homeland, going to Camburg in Thuringia, Weimar, Coburg and Gotha. In 1869 Müller as an honorary guest of the Khedive at the opening of the Suez Canal. In 1871 Müller became an honorary doctorate from the University of Jena, and a year later, an honorary citizen of his native city.

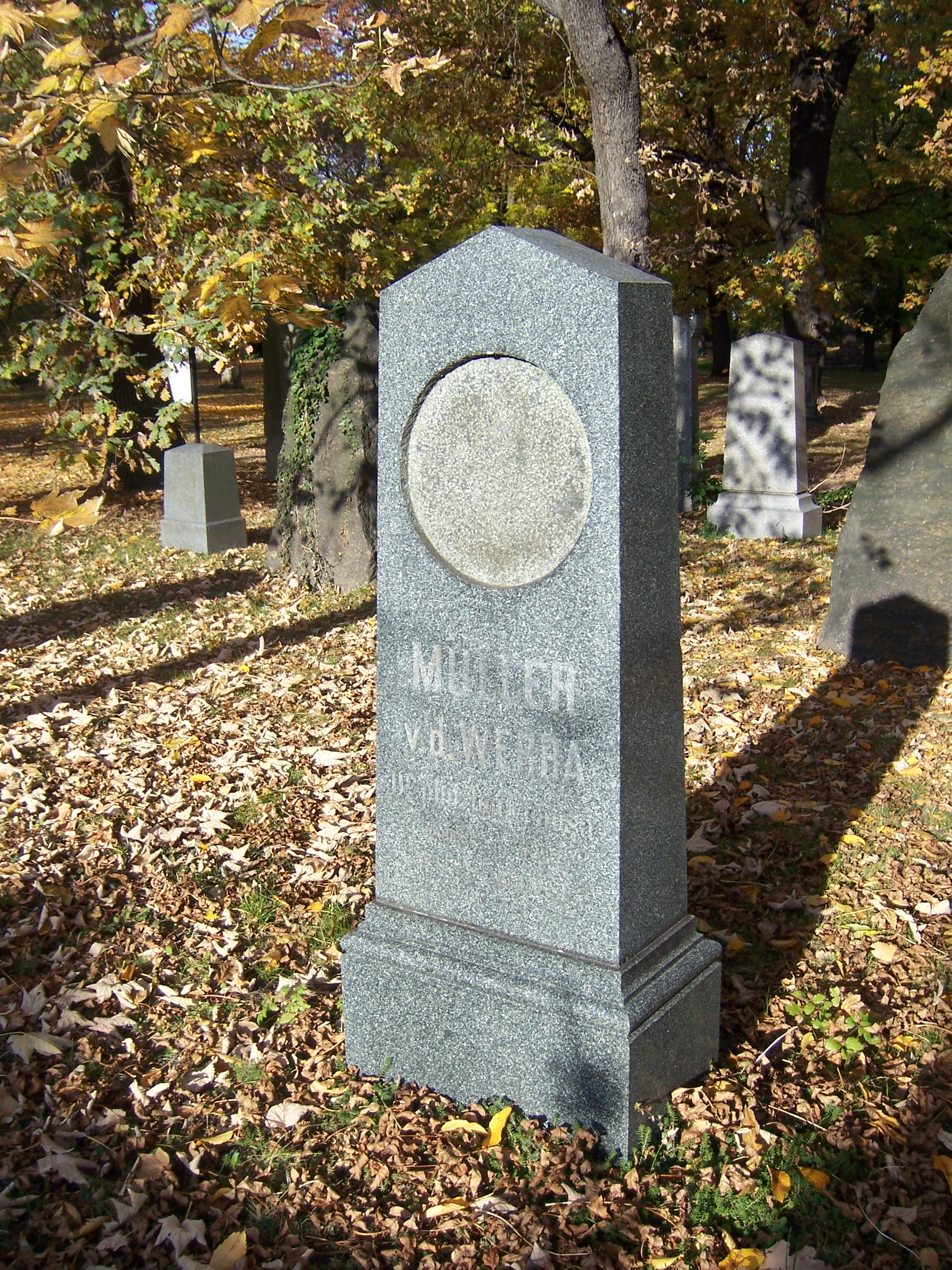
Müller's gravestone in Friedenspark, in Leipzig.

== Works (selection) ==
- The liberty miracle horn or Rothe roses and sword sound. A. See Biel 1850 (poems).
- A German oak ring. 1857 (poems).
- St. John's dream. 1860 (story).
- Thuringia. 1861 (guidebook).
- Ererbt und ergerbt. 1871 (story).
