= Westhausen, Hildburghausen =

Westhausen
- Municipality
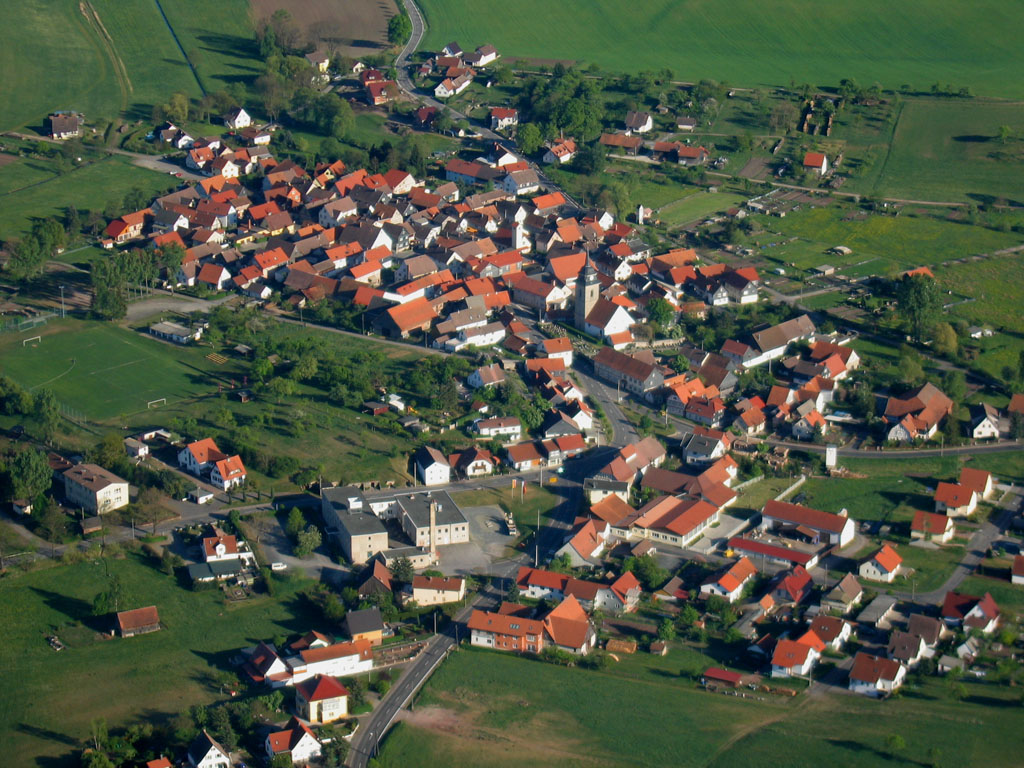

- Coat of arms

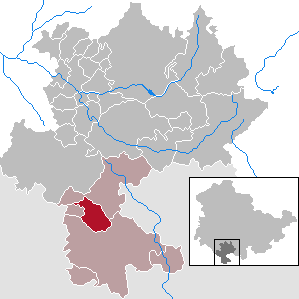
- Location of Westhausen within Hildburghausen district
- Interactive map of Westhausen
- Location within Germany Location within Thuringia
- Coordinates: 50°19′N 10°40′E
- Country: Germany
- State: Thuringia
- District: Hildburghausen
- Municipal assoc.: Heldburger Unterland

Government
  - Mayor (2020–26): Ulf Neundorf

Area
  - Total: 15.43 km^{2} (5.96 sq mi)
- Elevation: 349 m (1,145 ft)

Population (2025-12-31)
  - Total: 560
  - Density: 36/km^{2} (94/sq mi)
- Time zone: UTC+01:00 (CET)
  - Summer (DST): UTC+02:00 (CEST)
- Postal codes: 98663
- Dialling codes: 036875
- Vehicle registration: HBN
- Website: www.heldburg.de

Westhausen (German pronunciation: [vɛstˈhaʊzn̩]) is a municipality in the region Heldburger Land in the district of Hildburghausen, in Thuringia, Germany.
