= Lowland (National Council electoral district) =

Parliamentary electoral district in Austria

- Unterland
- Electoral District for the National Council
- Location of Lowland within Austria
- District: List: Kitzbühel; Kufstein
- State: Tyrol
- Population: 180,060 (2024)
- Electorate: 122,888 (2019)
- Area: 2,133 km^{2} (2023)

Current Electoral District
- Created: 1994
- Seats: List: 4 (2013–present); 3 (1994–2013)
- Members: Josef Hechenberger (ÖVP)

Lowland (German: Unterland), also known as Electoral District 7C (German: Wahlkreis 7C), is one of the 39 multi-member regional electoral districts of the National Council, the lower house of the Austrian Parliament, the national legislature of Austria. The electoral district was created in 1992 when electoral regulations were amended to add regional electoral districts to the existing state-wide electoral districts and came into being at the following legislative election in 1994. It consists of the districts of Kitzbühel and Kufstein in the state of Tyrol. The electoral district currently elects four of the 183 members of the National Council using the open party-list proportional representation electoral system. At the 2019 legislative election the constituency had 122,888 registered electors.

== History ==
Lowland was one 43 regional electoral districts (regionalwahlkreise) established by the "National Council Electoral Regulations 1992" (Nationalrats-Wahlordnung 1992) passed by the National Council in 1992. It consisted of the districts of Kitzbühel and Kufstein in the state of Tyrol. The district was initially allocated three seats in May 1993. Electoral regulations require the allocation of seats amongst the electoral districts to be recalculated following each national census and in June 2013 the number of seats allocated to Lowland was increased to four based on the population as at the 2011 national census.

== Electoral system ==
Lowland currently elects four of the 183 members of the National Council using the open party-list proportional representation electoral system. The allocation of seats is carried out in three stages. In the first stage, seats are allocated to parties (lists) at the regional level using a state-wide Hare quota (wahlzahl) (valid votes in the state divided by the number of seats in the state). In the second stage, seats are allocated to parties at the state/provincial level using the state-wide Hare quota (any seats won by the party at the regional stage are subtracted from the party's state seats). In the third and final stage, seats are allocated to parties at the federal/national level using the D'Hondt method (any seats won by the party at the regional and state stages are subtracted from the party's federal seats). Only parties that reach the 4% national threshold, or have won a seat at the regional stage, compete for seats at the state and federal stages.

Electors may cast one preferential vote for individual candidates at the regional, state and federal levels. Split-ticket voting (panachage), or voting for more than one candidate at each level, is not permitted and will result in the ballot paper being invalidated. At the regional level, candidates must receive preferential votes amounting to at least 14% of the valid votes cast for their party to over-ride the order of the party list (10% and 7% respectively for the state and federal levels). Prior to April 2013 electors could not cast preferential votes at the federal level and the thresholds candidates needed to over-ride the party list order were higher at the regional level (half the Hare quota or 1/6 of the party votes) and state level (Hare quota).

== Election results ==
=== Summary ===
Election	Communists KPÖ+ / KPÖ			Social Democrats SPÖ			Greens GRÜNE			NEOS NEOS / LiF			People's ÖVP			Freedom FPÖ		
Election	Votes	%	Seats	Votes	%	Seats	Votes	%	Seats	Votes	%	Seats	Votes	%	Seats	Votes	%	Seats
2019	345	0.39%	0	10,748	12.17%	0	10,690	12.10%	0	6,369	7.21%	0	45,075	51.04%	1	13,330	15.09%	0
2017	403	0.44%	0	17,282	18.67%	0	3,424	3.70%	0	4,233	4.57%	0	38,920	42.04%	1	24,221	26.16%	0
2013	394	0.49%	0	14,610	18.05%	0	10,399	12.85%	0	3,297	4.07%	0	26,833	33.15%	1	17,025	21.03%	0
2008	330	0.39%	0	15,506	18.46%	0	6,884	8.20%	0	1,306	1.56%	0	27,020	32.17%	1	15,299	18.22%	0
2006	505	0.62%	0	18,779	22.87%	0	8,053	9.81%	0				37,445	45.61%	1	9,787	11.92%	0
2002	524	0.59%	0	21,278	24.08%	0	7,987	9.04%	0	1,248	1.41%	0	46,637	52.77%	1	10,698	12.11%	0
1999	187	0.23%	0	19,399	24.02%	0	6,482	8.03%	0	2,285	2.83%	0	25,210	31.21%	1	25,453	31.52%	1
1995	227	0.26%	0	23,506	26.84%	0	4,987	5.69%	0	4,821	5.50%	0	25,857	29.52%	1	26,784	30.58%	1
1994	132	0.16%	0	21,254	25.89%	0	7,182	8.75%	0	3,737	4.55%	0	27,356	33.32%	1	20,602	25.09%	0

=== Detailed ===
==== 2010s ====
===== 2019 =====
Results of the 2019 legislative election held on 29 September 2019:

Party		Votes per district			Total votes	%	Seats
Party		Kitz- bühel	Kuf- stein	Voting card	Total votes	%	Seats
Austrian People's Party	ÖVP	18,405	26,586	84	45,075	51.04%	1
Freedom Party of Austria	FPÖ	4,350	8,948	32	13,330	15.09%	0
Social Democratic Party of Austria	SPÖ	3,527	7,202	19	10,748	12.17%	0
The Greens – The Green Alternative	GRÜNE	3,859	6,777	54	10,690	12.10%	0
NEOS – The New Austria and Liberal Forum	NEOS	2,497	3,826	46	6,369	7.21%	0
JETZT	JETZT	365	836	3	1,204	1.36%	0
KPÖ Plus	KPÖ+	110	231	4	345	0.39%	0
My Vote Counts!	GILT	75	212	2	289	0.33%	0
Der Wandel	WANDL	75	185	3	263	0.30%	0
Valid Votes		33,263	54,803	247	88,313	100.00%	1
Rejected Votes		241	386	2	629	0.71%	
Total Polled		33,504	55,189	249	88,942	72.38%	
Registered Electors		45,891	76,997		122,888		
Turnout		73.01%	71.68%		72.38%		

The following candidates were elected:

- Personal mandates - Josef Hechenberger (ÖVP), 12,846 votes.

===== 2017 =====
Results of the 2017 legislative election held on 15 October 2017:

Party		Votes per district			Total votes	%	Seats
Party		Kitz- bühel	Kuf- stein	Voting card	Total votes	%	Seats
Austrian People's Party	ÖVP	15,845	22,967	108	38,920	42.04%	1
Freedom Party of Austria	FPÖ	8,618	15,556	47	24,221	26.16%	0
Social Democratic Party of Austria	SPÖ	5,953	11,270	59	17,282	18.67%	0
NEOS – The New Austria and Liberal Forum	NEOS	1,643	2,560	30	4,233	4.57%	0
The Greens – The Green Alternative	GRÜNE	1,229	2,170	25	3,424	3.70%	0
Peter Pilz List	PILZ	1,019	1,889	22	2,930	3.16%	0
My Vote Counts!	GILT	261	526	3	790	0.85%	0
Communist Party of Austria	KPÖ	118	282	3	403	0.44%	0
Free List Austria	FLÖ	49	143	0	192	0.21%	0
The Whites	WEIßE	62	117	2	181	0.20%	0
Valid Votes		34,797	57,480	299	92,576	100.00%	1
Rejected Votes		287	446	2	735	0.79%	
Total Polled		35,084	57,926	301	93,311	76.15%	
Registered Electors		46,038	76,495		122,533		
Turnout		76.21%	75.73%		76.15%		

The following candidates were elected:

- Personal mandates - Andrä Rupprechter (ÖVP), 12,295 votes.

Substitutions:

- Andrä Rupprechter (ÖVP) resigned on 30 January 2018 and was replaced by Josef Lettenbichler (ÖVP) on 31 January 2018.

===== 2013 =====
Results of the 2013 legislative election held on 29 September 2013:

Party		Votes per district			Total votes	%	Seats
Party		Kitz- bühel	Kuf- stein	Voting card	Total votes	%	Seats
Austrian People's Party	ÖVP	10,947	15,829	57	26,833	33.15%	1
Freedom Party of Austria	FPÖ	5,811	11,197	17	17,025	21.03%	0
Social Democratic Party of Austria	SPÖ	5,446	9,142	22	14,610	18.05%	0
The Greens – The Green Alternative	GRÜNE	3,756	6,590	53	10,399	12.85%	0
Team Stronach	FRANK	2,113	3,249	6	5,368	6.63%	0
NEOS – The New Austria	NEOS	1,166	2,115	16	3,297	4.07%	0
Alliance for the Future of Austria	BZÖ	971	1,517	10	2,498	3.09%	0
Pirate Party of Austria	PIRAT	171	345	0	516	0.64%	0
Communist Party of Austria	KPÖ	134	259	1	394	0.49%	0
Valid Votes		30,515	50,243	182	80,940	100.00%	1
Rejected Votes		379	629	0	1,008	1.23%	
Total Polled		30,894	50,872	182	81,948	67.72%	
Registered Electors		46,030	74,978		121,008		
Turnout		67.12%	67.85%		67.72%		

The following candidates were elected:

- Personal mandates - Josef Lettenbichler (ÖVP), 6,473 votes.

==== 2000s ====
===== 2008 =====
Results of the 2008 legislative election held on 28 September 2008:

Party		Votes per district			Total votes	%	Seats
Party		Kitz- bühel	Kuf- stein	Voting card	Total votes	%	Seats
Austrian People's Party	ÖVP	11,220	15,658	142	27,020	32.17%	1
Social Democratic Party of Austria	SPÖ	5,786	9,641	79	15,506	18.46%	0
Freedom Party of Austria	FPÖ	5,096	10,164	39	15,299	18.22%	0
Alliance for the Future of Austria	BZÖ	3,505	6,061	54	9,620	11.45%	0
The Greens – The Green Alternative	GRÜNE	2,471	4,303	110	6,884	8.20%	0
Fritz Dinkhauser List – Citizens' Forum Tyrol	FRITZ	2,694	4,034	31	6,759	8.05%	0
Liberal Forum	LiF	458	828	20	1,306	1.56%	0
The Christians	DC	240	376	2	618	0.74%	0
Independent Citizens' Initiative Save Austria	RETTÖ	192	344	6	542	0.65%	0
Communist Party of Austria	KPÖ	118	207	5	330	0.39%	0
Left	LINKE	16	85	0	101	0.12%	0
Valid Votes		31,796	51,701	488	83,985	100.00%	1
Rejected Votes		457	729	5	1,191	1.40%	
Total Polled		32,253	52,430	493	85,176	72.10%	
Registered Electors		45,629	72,513		118,142		
Turnout		70.69%	72.30%		72.10%		

The following candidates were elected:

- Personal mandates - Josef Lettenbichler (ÖVP), 5,094 votes.

===== 2006 =====
Results of the 2006 legislative election held on 1 October 2006:

Party		Votes per district			Total votes	%	Seats
Party		Kitz- bühel	Kuf- stein	Voting card	Total votes	%	Seats
Austrian People's Party	ÖVP	14,958	21,007	1,480	37,445	45.61%	1
Social Democratic Party of Austria	SPÖ	6,578	11,601	600	18,779	22.87%	0
Freedom Party of Austria	FPÖ	3,233	6,339	215	9,787	11.92%	0
The Greens – The Green Alternative	GRÜNE	2,626	4,761	666	8,053	9.81%	0
Hans-Peter Martin's List	MATIN	1,244	2,242	103	3,589	4.37%	0
Alliance for the Future of Austria	BZÖ	947	2,082	65	3,094	3.77%	0
EU Withdrawal – Neutral Free Austria	NFÖ	268	565	13	846	1.03%	0
Communist Party of Austria	KPÖ	145	338	22	505	0.62%	0
Valid Votes		29,999	48,935	3,164	82,098	100.00%	1
Rejected Votes		420	664	22	1,106	1.33%	
Total Polled		30,419	49,599	3,186	83,204	73.76%	
Registered Electors		43,793	69,013		112,806		
Turnout		69.46%	71.87%		73.76%		

The following candidates were elected:

- Party mandates - Sebastian Eder (ÖVP), 6,012 votes.

===== 2002 =====
Results of the 2002 legislative election held on 24 November 2002:

Party		Votes per district			Total votes	%	Seats
Party		Kitz- bühel	Kuf- stein	Voting card	Total votes	%	Seats
Austrian People's Party	ÖVP	18,235	26,475	1,927	46,637	52.77%	1
Social Democratic Party of Austria	SPÖ	7,845	12,831	602	21,278	24.08%	0
Freedom Party of Austria	FPÖ	3,770	6,688	240	10,698	12.11%	0
The Greens – The Green Alternative	GRÜNE	2,573	4,760	654	7,987	9.04%	0
Liberal Forum	LiF	367	814	67	1,248	1.41%	0
Communist Party of Austria	KPÖ	137	370	17	524	0.59%	0
Valid Votes		32,927	51,938	3,507	88,372	100.00%	1
Rejected Votes		498	815	19	1,332	1.48%	
Total Polled		33,425	52,753	3,526	89,704	83.52%	
Registered Electors		42,236	65,170		107,406		
Turnout		79.14%	80.95%		83.52%		

The following candidates were elected:

- Party mandates - Johannes Schweisgut (ÖVP), 5,849 votes.

==== 1990s ====
===== 1999 =====
Results of the 1999 legislative election held on 3 October 1999:

Party		Votes per district			Total votes	%	Seats
Party		Kitz- bühel	Kuf- stein	Voting card	Total votes	%	Seats
Freedom Party of Austria	FPÖ	8,790	15,912	751	25,453	31.52%	1
Austrian People's Party	ÖVP	10,092	14,096	1,022	25,210	31.21%	1
Social Democratic Party of Austria	SPÖ	7,459	11,301	639	19,399	24.02%	0
The Greens – The Green Alternative	GRÜNE	2,196	3,840	446	6,482	8.03%	0
Liberal Forum	LiF	807	1,198	280	2,285	2.83%	0
The Independents	DU	392	731	35	1,158	1.43%	0
No to NATO and EU – Neutral Austria Citizens' Initiative	NEIN	138	254	19	411	0.51%	0
Communist Party of Austria	KPÖ	58	122	7	187	0.23%	0
Christian Voters Community	CWG	50	114	14	178	0.22%	0
Valid Votes		29,982	47,568	3,213	80,763	100.00%	2
Rejected Votes		489	866	30	1,385	1.69%	
Total Polled		30,471	48,434	3,243	82,148	78.01%	
Registered Electors		41,850	63,459		105,309		
Turnout		72.81%	76.32%		78.01%		

The following candidates were elected:

- Party mandates - Edith Haller (FPÖ), 2,439 votes; and Johannes Schweisgut (ÖVP), 3,713 votes.

===== 1995 =====
Results of the 1995 legislative election held on 17 December 1995:

Party		Votes per district			Total votes	%	Seats
Party		Kitz- bühel	Kuf- stein	Voting card	Total votes	%	Seats
Freedom Party of Austria	FPÖ	9,780	16,557	447	26,784	30.58%	1
Austrian People's Party	ÖVP	10,342	14,766	749	25,857	29.52%	1
Social Democratic Party of Austria	SPÖ	9,016	14,062	428	23,506	26.84%	0
The Greens – The Green Alternative	GRÜNE	1,651	2,998	338	4,987	5.69%	0
Liberal Forum	LiF	1,813	2,710	298	4,821	5.50%	0
No – Civic Action Group; Against the Sale of Austria	NEIN	538	856	14	1,408	1.61%	0
Communist Party of Austria	KPÖ	91	131	5	227	0.26%	0
Valid Votes		33,231	52,080	2,279	87,590	100.00%	2
Rejected Votes		1,021	1,806	33	2,860	3.16%	
Total Polled		34,252	53,886	2,312	90,450	88.59%	
Registered Electors		40,728	61,369		102,097		
Turnout		84.10%	87.81%		88.59%		

The following candidates were elected:

- Personal mandates - Katharina Horngacher (ÖVP), 4,665 votes.
- Party mandates - Edith Haller (FPÖ), 1,817 votes.

Substitutions:

- Edith Haller (FPÖ) was reassigned to the Tyrol seat vacated by Anton Blünegger and was replaced by Hans Sevignani (FPÖ) in Lowland on 26 April 1999.

===== 1994 =====
Results of the 1994 legislative election held on 9 October 1994:

Party		Votes per district			Total votes	%	Seats
Party		Kitz- bühel	Kuf- stein	Voting card	Total votes	%	Seats
Austrian People's Party	ÖVP	10,249	16,097	1,010	27,356	33.32%	1
Social Democratic Party of Austria	SPÖ	7,939	12,685	630	21,254	25.89%	0
Freedom Party of Austria	FPÖ	7,534	12,519	549	20,602	25.09%	0
The Greens – The Green Alternative	GRÜNE	2,440	4,269	473	7,182	8.75%	0
Liberal Forum	LiF	1,427	2,009	301	3,737	4.55%	0
No – Civic Action Group; Against the Sale of Austria	NEIN	446	730	42	1,218	1.48%	0
Christian Voters Community	CWG	98	184	15	297	0.36%	0
Natural Law Party	ÖNP	60	134	7	201	0.24%	0
Communist Party of Austria	KPÖ	38	87	7	132	0.16%	0
United Greens Austria – List Adi Pinter	VGÖ	41	72	5	118	0.14%	0
Valid Votes		30,272	48,786	3,039	82,097	100.00%	1
Rejected Votes		909	1,682	32	2,623	3.10%	
Total Polled		31,181	50,468	3,071	84,720	83.43%	
Registered Electors		40,508	61,044		101,552		
Turnout		76.97%	82.67%		83.43%		

The following candidates were elected:

- Personal mandates - Sixtus Lanner (ÖVP), 6,067 votes.
