= Heldburg Fortress =

Coordinates: 50°17′19″N 10°43′43″E

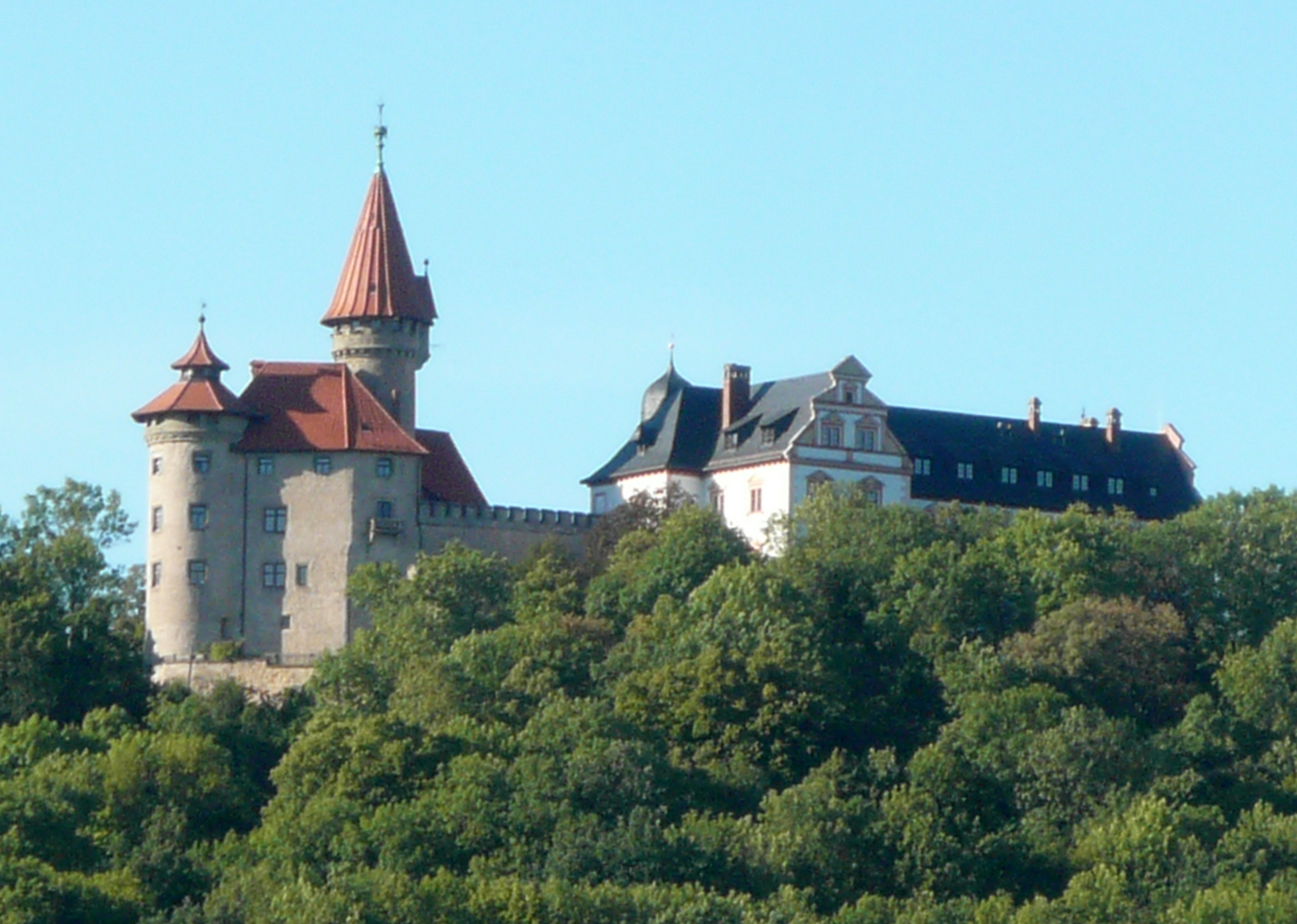
Veste Heldburg or Heldburg fortress.

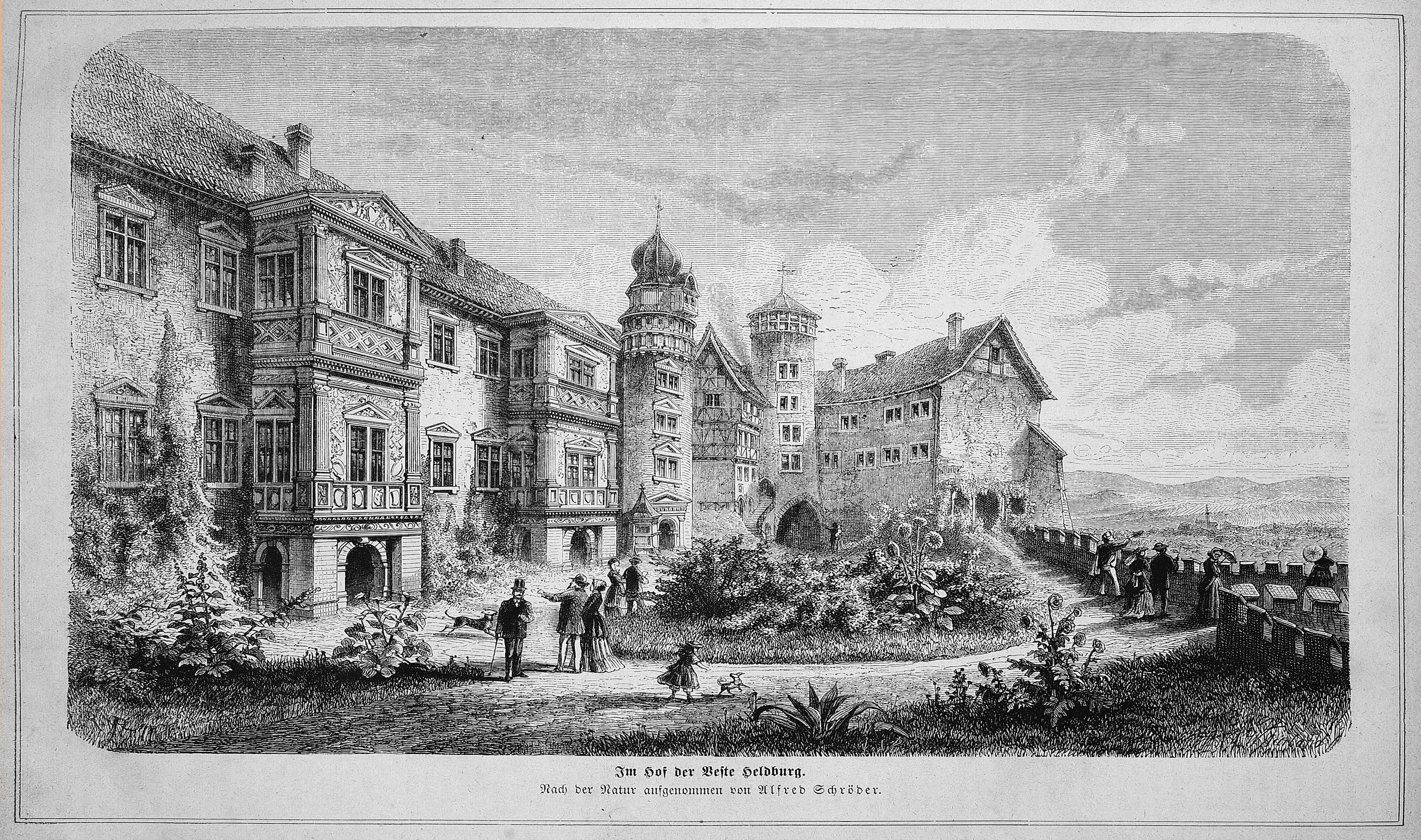
The courtyard of the castle Veste Heldburg in 1872, left the Französicher Bau (French Building).

Heldburg Fortress (German: Veste Heldburg) is a high medieval hilltop castle. In the 16th century it was rebuilt into a renaissance castle. It rises on a 405-metre-high former volcanic cone, a part of the 'Heldburger Gangschar' volcanic region, 113 metres above the town of Heldburg in the Heldburger Land, the southern tip of the district Hildburghausen in Thuringia. The Veste Heldburg (also called the "Franconian light"), once a secondary residence and hunting lodge of the Dukes of Coburg, dominates the little town of Heldburg on the Thuringian border with Bavaria. From it can be seen across the Thuringian border the sister-castle Veste Coburg, (also called the "Franconian crown"), once the residence of the Dukes of Coburg, now located in Bavaria.

At the beginning of the 14th Century the hilltop castle was owned by the Counts of Henneberg-Schleusingen and served as the administrative and judicial seat after the regional power center on Struphe castle (now in ruins Straufhain nearby Streufdorf) was abandoned. In 1374 the Veste Heldburg came into the possession of the Wettin family. Johann Friedrich the Middle had it reconstructed in 1560 by his court architect Nikolaus Gromann in the style of the Renaissance (it was originally called the "Neuer Bau", but today is known as the "Französischer Bau") and removed the ducal residence. Gromann's important Renaissance buildings include in addition to the aforementioned "Französischer Bau", the "Französisches Schloss" (now the "Duchess Anna Amalia Library") in Weimar and the City Hall of Altenburg..

Duke Johann Casimir (Saxe-Coburg) used the castle as a hunting lodge for decades. On the occasion of his marriage (nuptials) with Margaret of Brunswick-Lüneburg in September 1599 numerous guests of the Duke stayed here, including beside the bride Princess Margaret of Brunswick-Lüneburg Margrave Georg Friedrich I (Brandenburg-Ansbach-Kulmbach), Duke Ernst II (Braunschweig-Lüneburg), Duke Wilhelm Kettler of Courland and Semigallians and Duke Johann Ernst (Sachsen-Eisenach), each with their entourage.

After several conquests and plundering during the Thirty Years' War the castle was held in 1776 and re-attached residence of the Ernestine dukes of Saxe-Hildburghausen and finally in 1871 became the property of the ducal house of Meiningen. George II, Duke of Saxe-Meiningen restored extensively the building during 1874–1898 lived in it from time to time since May 1877 with his third wife Helene, Freifrau von Heldburg (born Ellen Franz).

After 1918, Veste Heldburg remained property of the House of Saxe-Meiningen. In 1945, the castle was confiscated by the Soviet occupying force and Georg, Prince of Saxe-Meiningen received no compensation.

On September 8, 2016, the Deutsches Burgenmuseum was opened on the Veste Heldburg.

== See also ==
- E. Fritze: Die Veste Heldburg. Jena 1903, Reprint: Frankenschwelle, Hildburghausen 1990, ISBN 3-86180-016-0
- Norbert Klaus Fuchs: Das Heldburger Land–ein historischer Reiseführer; Verlag Rockstuhl, Bad Langensalza 2013, ISBN 978-3-86777-349-2
