= Heldburg =

- Town
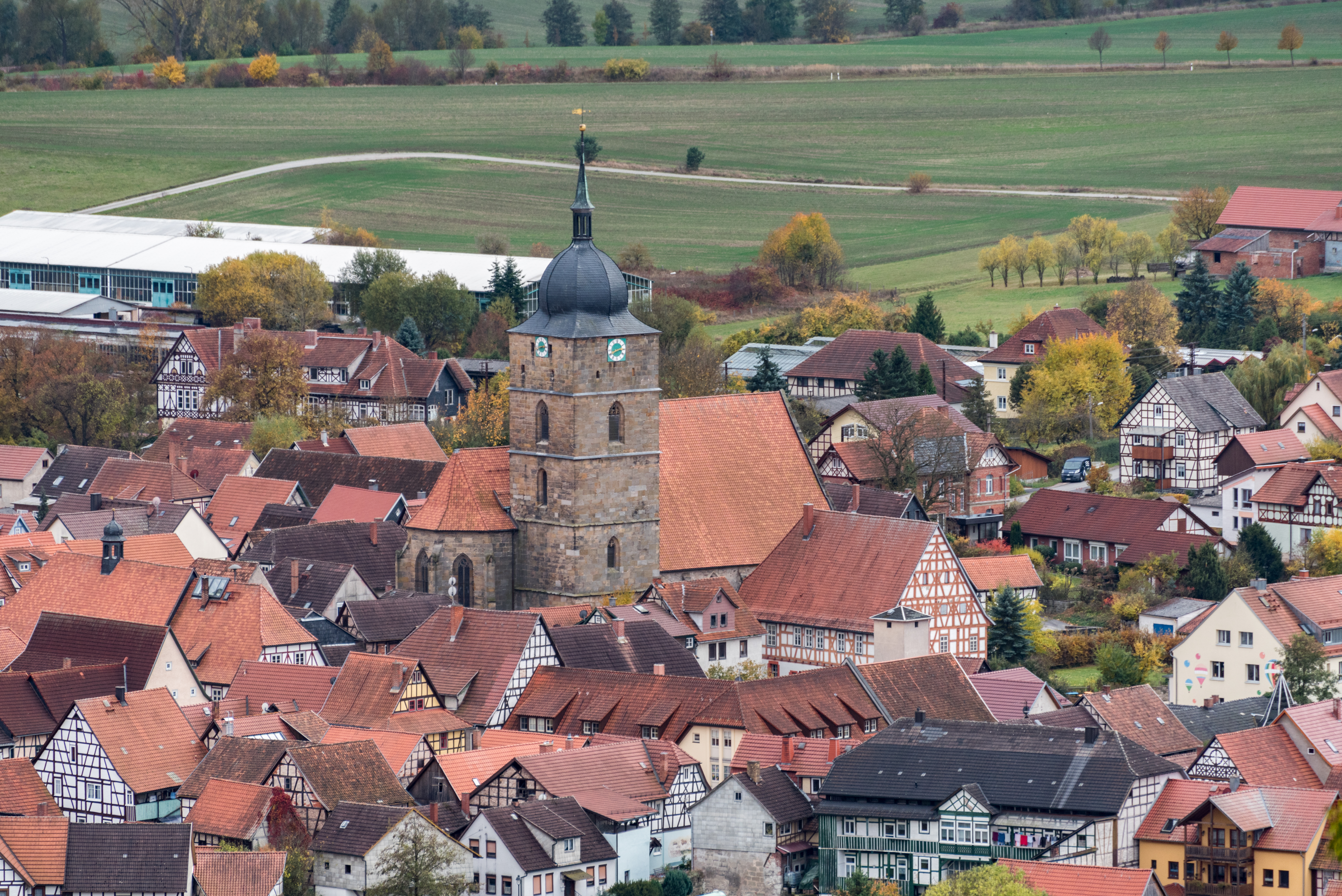

- Coat of arms

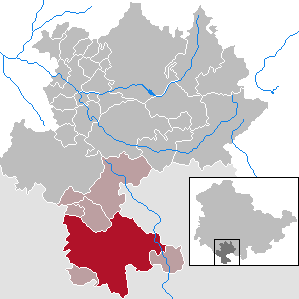
- Location of Heldburg within Hildburghausen district
- Interactive map of Heldburg
- Location within Germany Location within Thuringia
- Coordinates: 50°17′N 10°44′E
- Country: Germany
- State: Thuringia
- District: Hildburghausen
- Municipal assoc.: Heldburger Unterland
- Subdivisions: 13

Government
  - Mayor (2019–25): Christopher Other (CDU)

Area
  - Total: 112.74 km^{2} (43.53 sq mi)
- Elevation: 288 m (945 ft)

Population (2025-12-31)
  - Total: 3,261
  - Density: 28.92/km^{2} (74.92/sq mi)
- Time zone: UTC+01:00 (CET)
  - Summer (DST): UTC+02:00 (CEST)
- Postal codes: 98663
- Dialling codes: 036871
- Vehicle registration: HBN
- Website: stadt-heldburg.de

Heldburg (German pronunciation: [ˈhɛltbʊʁk]) is a town and a municipality in the district of Hildburghausen, in Thuringia, in central Germany. The municipality was created with effect from 1 January 2019 by the merger of the former municipalities of Bad Colberg-Heldburg, Gompertshausen and Hellingen. It is situated 16 km south of Hildburghausen, and 18 km west of Coburg.

== Administrative division ==
- Albingshausen
- Bad Colberg
- Einöd
- Gellershausen
- Gompertshausen
- Heldburg
- Hellingen
- Holzhausen
- Käßlitz
- Lindenau
- Poppenhausen
- Rieth
- Völkershausen
- Volkmannshausen

== History ==
Heldburg was first mentioned in 837. It lies at the foot of the Heldburg Fortress. In 1374 it passed to the landgraves of Thuringia. Heldburg was granted town rights in 1394.

In 1900, the town had a population of 1,040.

During World War II, on 11 May 1942, the present-day district of Poppenhausen was the site of a massacre of 20 Polish prisoners of the Buchenwald concentration camp, who were publicly hanged by the Gestapo. After the war, the town was part of East Germany.

In 1993 it became part of the municipality Bad Colberg-Heldburg.
