= Ondřej Chrysoponus Jevíčský =

Czech composer

Ondřej Chrysoponus Jevíčský (also Andreas Chrysoponus Gevicenus; born c. 1550 – died after 1590) was a Czech composer who was active in Prachatice in southern Bohemia from 1576-82.

He composed works mainly for Czech schools and literary associations. The majority of his output was settings of Latin texts for five to nine voices with melodies inspired by Gregorian chants and Czech sacred songs.

His only publication, Bicinia nova (Prague, 1579) is a collection of 100 two-voice works. Also extant are four masses for six to eight voices, two cycles of Proper chants and 25 motets; all these works, with the exception of the motet Et valde mane (1578), survive incomplete.

== Sources ==
- Jiří Sehnal. "Chrysoponus [Chrysogonus] Gevicenus [Gevicensis], Andreas [Chrysoponus Jevíčský, Ondřej]", The New Grove Dictionary of Music and Musicians, 2nd ed. Edited by Stanley Sadie, 2001.
