= Nikolaus Gromann =

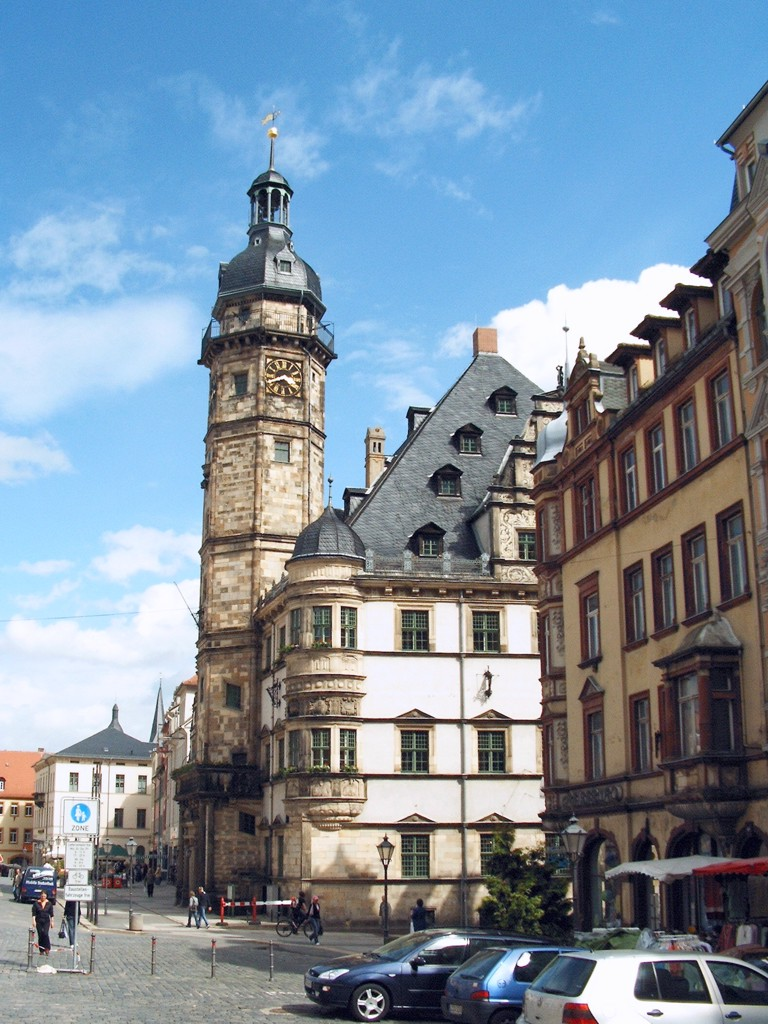
Town Hall in Altenburg

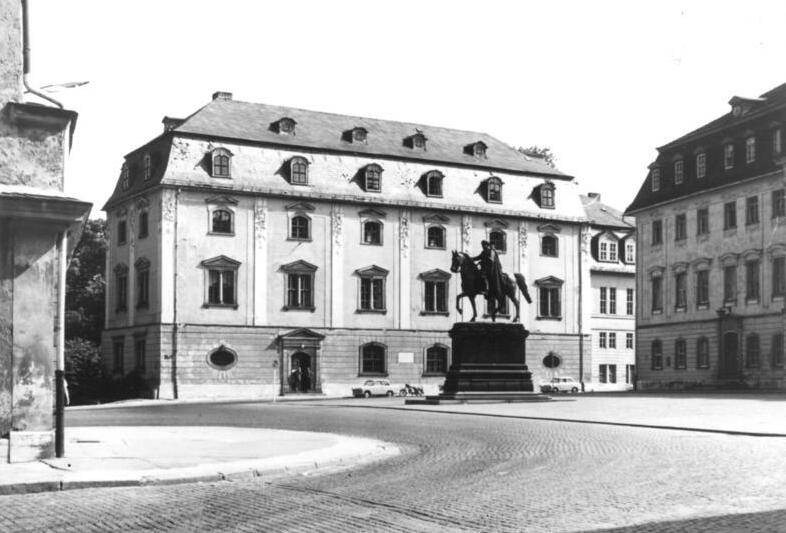
French or Green palace at Weimar, picture from 1991, later Herzogin Anna Amalia Bibliothek

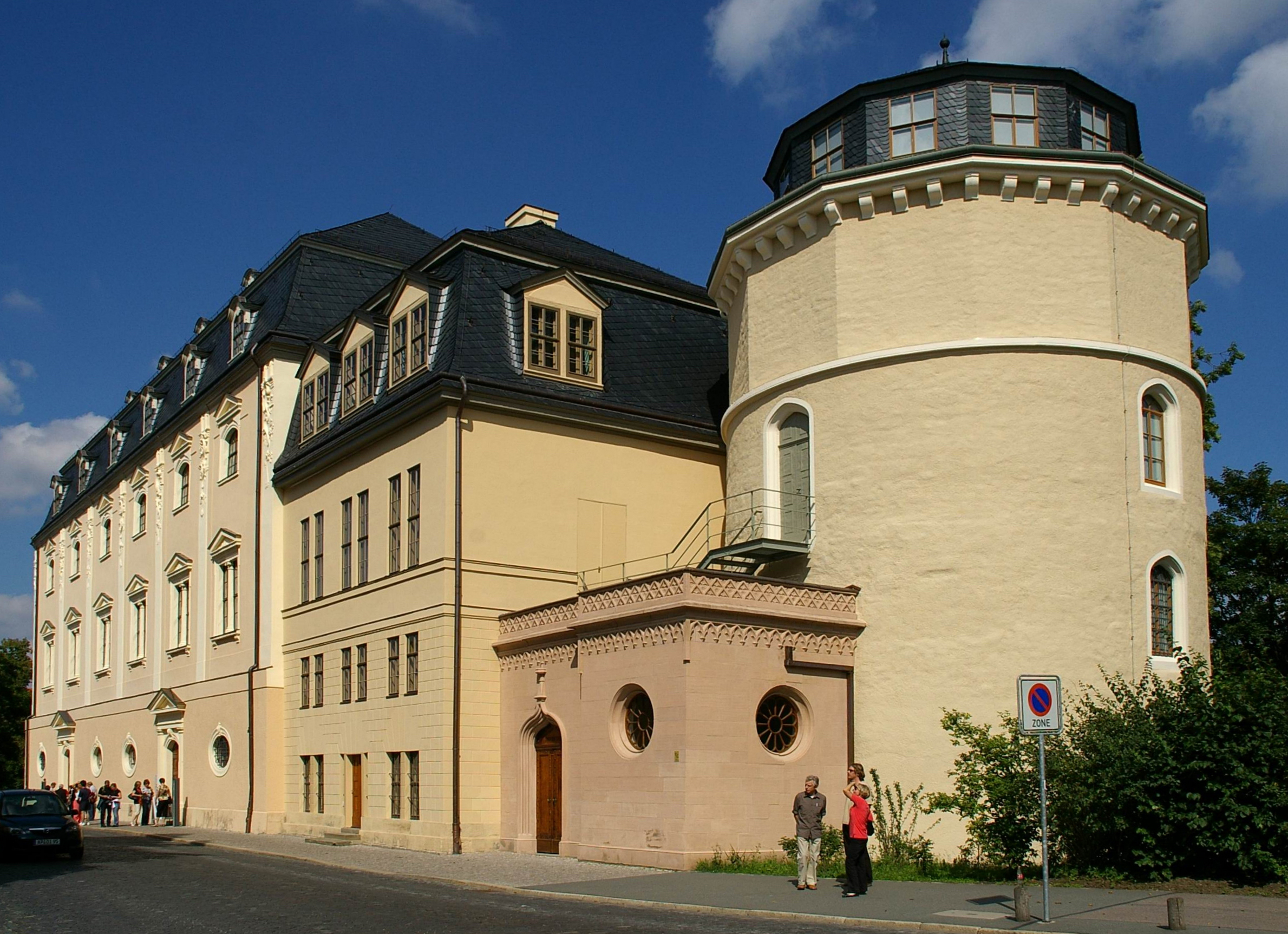
Today: Ducess Anna Amalia library at Weimar

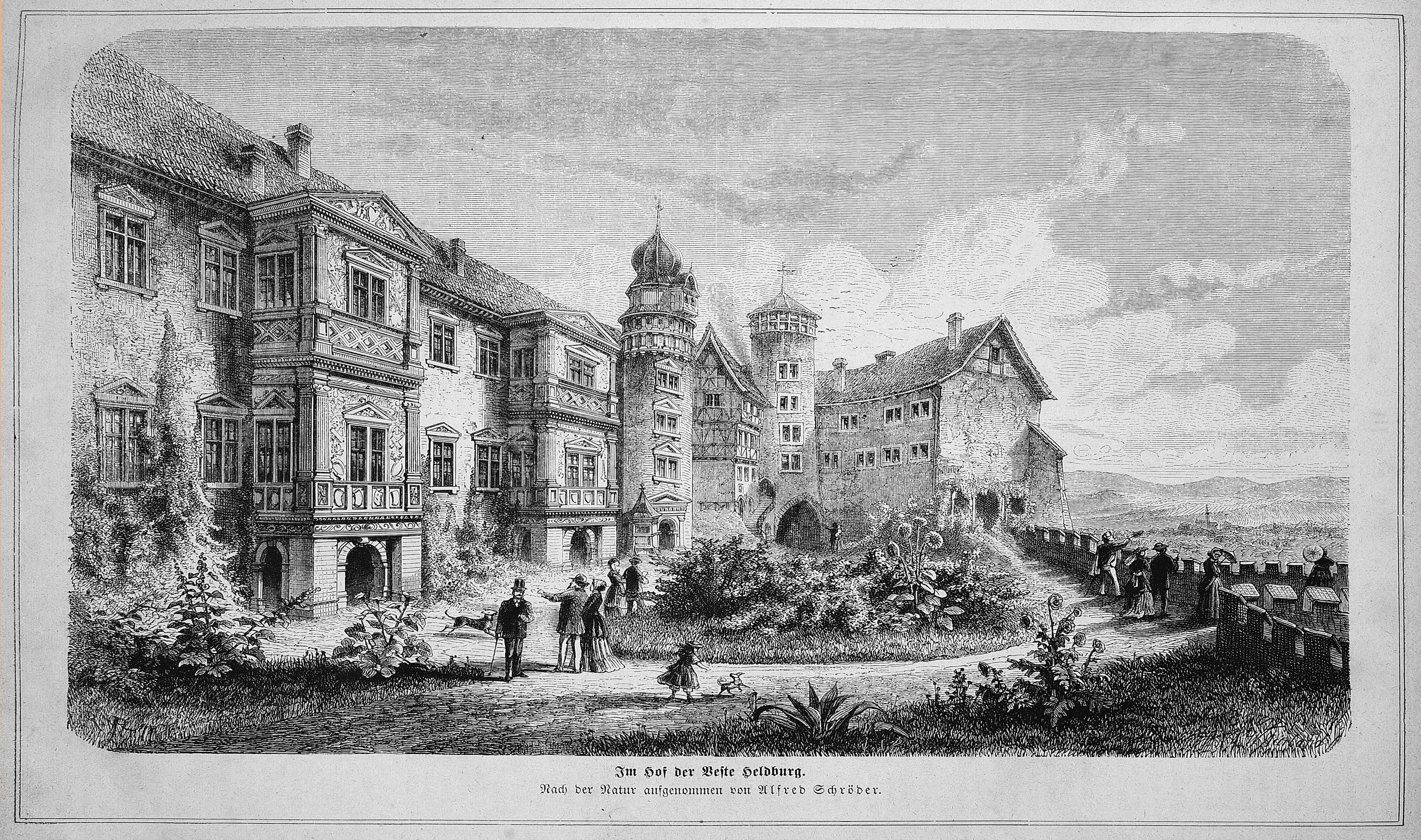
The courtyard of the castle Veste Heldburg in 1872, left the Französischer Bau (French Building)

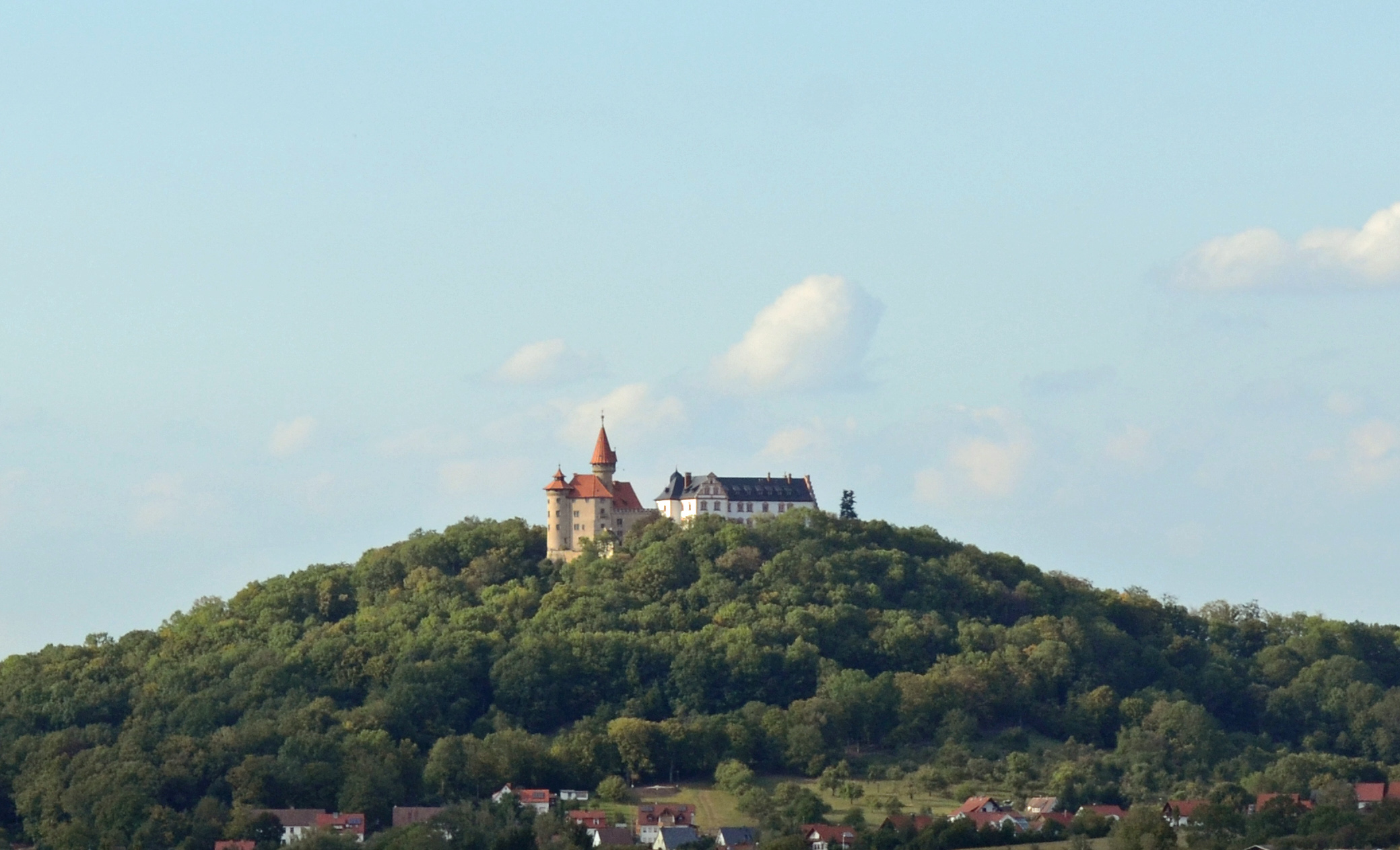
Veste Heldburg above town Heldburg

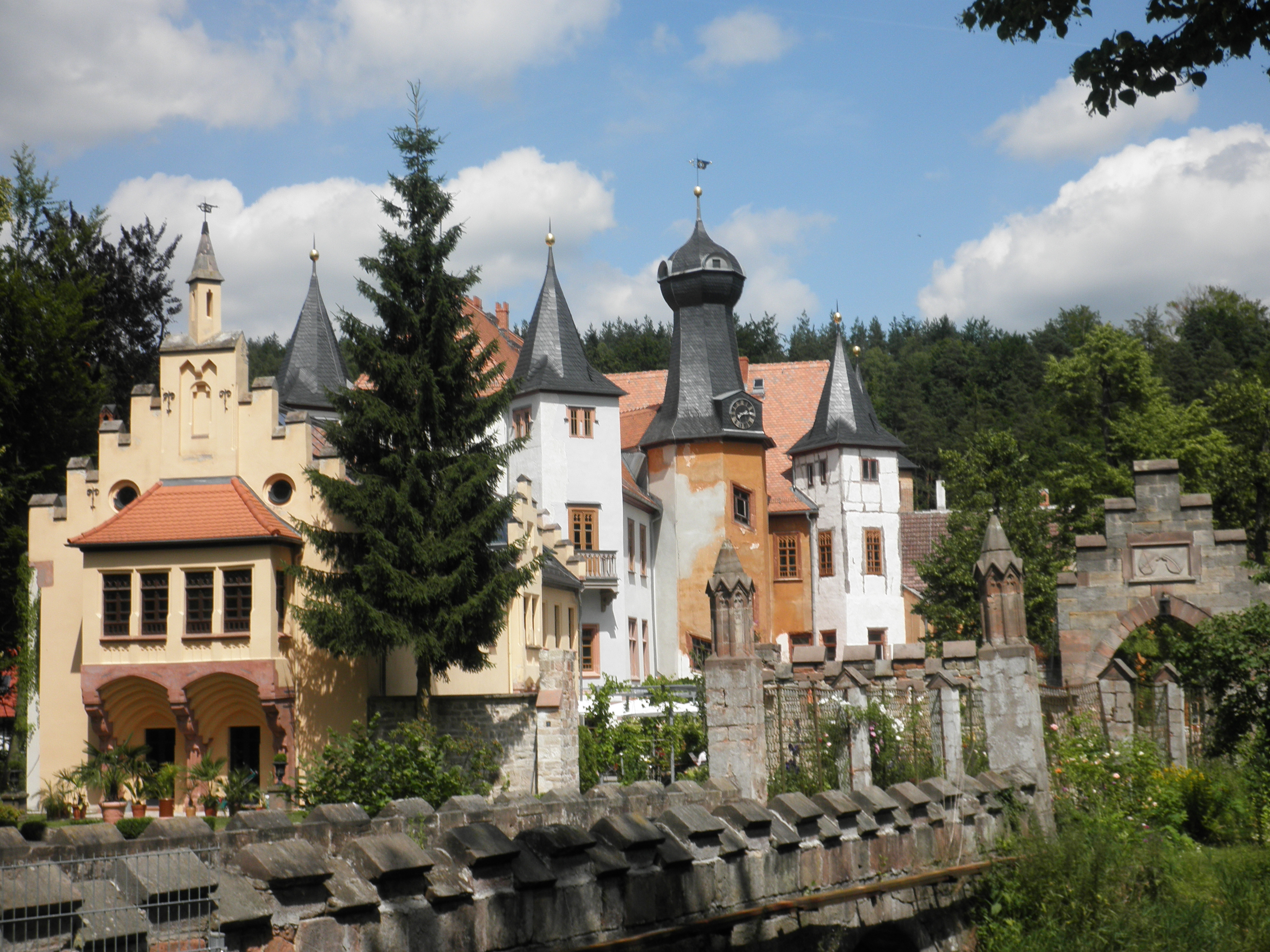
Hunting lodge Fröhliche Wiederkehr (happy return) at Wolfersdorf

Nikolaus Gromann (c. 1500 – 29 November 1566) was an architect of the German Renaissance who served at the court of John Frederick I, Elector of Saxony. He also worked for John Frederick's descendants residing in the cities of Weimar, Gotha and Altenburg, thus spending more than 30 years in the service of the House of Wettin.

== Background ==
For over 30 years he was in the service of the Ernestine branch of the Wettin family. A letter addressed to John Frederick I dating from 1536 is the earliest written proof of Gromann's service. The letter was signed as "stonemason" (German: Stein Metz). His teachers were Konrad Krebs (also known as Kunz Krebs, died 1540 in Torgau) and Andreas Günter (died 1542 in Torgau), whose work he continued. While his first residence was located in Weida, Gromann referred to Gotha as his home in 1544. Six years later, in 1550, Gromann moved to Weimar where he built his own house. In order to move back to Gotha, he sold it in 1563. A few years earlier, in 1553 Gromann had been allocated some acres of farmland in Gotha by John Frederick I. It was also the Elector of Saxony who appointed Gromann as master builder for life.

Gromann first received special attention when he built the first Protestant church, the chapel at Schloss Hartenfels in Torgau, in the period from 1543 to 1544. The "Emperor's Room" (German: Emporensaal) church was added skillfully into the medieval structure. Luther sanctified the church in person upon completion. The model of the Torgau Castle Church formed the basis for the designs of the castle chapels of Protestant princes in Dresden, Schwerin, Stettin (today Szczecin), Heidelberg and Augustusburg. In 1552 Gromann applied a similar design to the chapel of the castle Grimmenstein, which was not preserved.

Gromann supervised many construction sites in the Ernestine duchies. In addition he built castles, town halls, churches, fortifications, roads, bridges and fountains.

Nikolaus Gromann is credited with introducing of renaissance design to the Ernestine duchies. In his early work he expressed this by adding decorative renaissance ornaments to gothic buildings. In his late work he constructed buildings in the renaissance style, which are considered his masterpieces: the Town Hall in Altenburg, the "new buildings" in Weimar, the Green Castle (German: Grünes Schloss) and the French Building (German: Französischen Bau) of the Veste Heldburg. Gromann implemented his design for the bay windows in the living apartments of the elector on the north wing of the Castle Torgau and at the Französischer Bau of the Veste Heldburg. Today, the two bay windows are called the "Men's bay window" and "Women's bay window". His design of the Gera town hall could not be finished by himself. The project was continued by Nikolaus Theiner in 1573.

== Buildings ==
- 1536/37 Conversion of Osterburg of Weida (rebuilt)
- 1543–1545 Schloss Hartenfels and the church of the palace in Torgau, together with Kunz Krebs, Gromann built the north wing of the castle and the palace church, which was the first Protestant church (extant)
- 1548–1552 Hunting lodge "Happy Return" (German: Fröhliche Wiederkunft ) in the forest of Wolfersdorf (rebuilt)
- 1549 Palace Stadtroda in Stadtroda (destroyed by fire in 1638)
- 1549 Cranachhaus in Weimar (restored, faithful to the original reconstruction after bomb damage in 1945)
- 1550 reconstruction of the palace of Wartburg in Eisenach (rebuilt)
- 1550 reconstruction of the Weimar Stadtschloss (portal of the gatehouse extant)
- 1554–1560 alterations at the Veste Coburg Coburg (rebuilt)
- 1552 construction of the 80 m deep castle well on the Leuchtenburg
- 1552/53 fortifications and castle Grimmenstein in Gotha (destroyed in 1567)
- 1554 Schloss Ehrenburg in the Coburg (south wing and stair tower extant)
- 1554 Duchess Anna Amalia Library in Weimar, then known as the French building (rebuilt)
- 1555 grave plate for Lucas Cranach the Elder (situated in the Herderkirche)
- 1555–1557 expansion and strengthening of the castle walls of Schloss Herbsleben
- 1557–1559 Colleges in Jena (Jena University halls of residence)
- 1560 Old Castle of Dornburger castles in Dornburg / Saale (extant)
- 1560–1564 expansion of the Veste Heldburg, construction of the French building of the fortress in the Heldburg (destroyed by fire in 1982, faithful to the original reconstruction since 1990, 2013: restored; furnishings with the Deutsches Burgenmuseum (German Castle Museum), Opening: 8 September 2016) and construction of the 114 meter deep castle well
- 1562 Rathaus(town hall) in Altenburg (extant)
- 1563 reconstruction of the Leuchtenburg near Kahla (rebuilt)
- 1573–1576 Rathaus in Gera, designed by Grohman, construction by Nikolaus Theiner (extant)

== Secondary literature ==
- Lutz Unbehaun: Nikolaus Gromann und der Schlossbau unter den Ernestinern im 16. Jahrhundert.. In: Heiko Laß (Hrsg.): Von der Burg zum Schloss. Landesherrlicher und Adeliger Profanbau in Thüringen im 15. und 16. Jahrhundert (=Palmbaum Texte. Kulturgeschichte 10). 2001, S. 133–150.
- Norbert Klaus Fuchs: Das Heldburger Land–ein historischer Reiseführer (The Land of Heldburg – a Historical Guide); Verlag Rockstuhl, Bad Langensalza 2013, ISBN 978-3-86777-349-2
