= German Castle Museum =

Coordinates: 50°17′20″N 10°43′45″E

- Deutsches Burgenmuseum
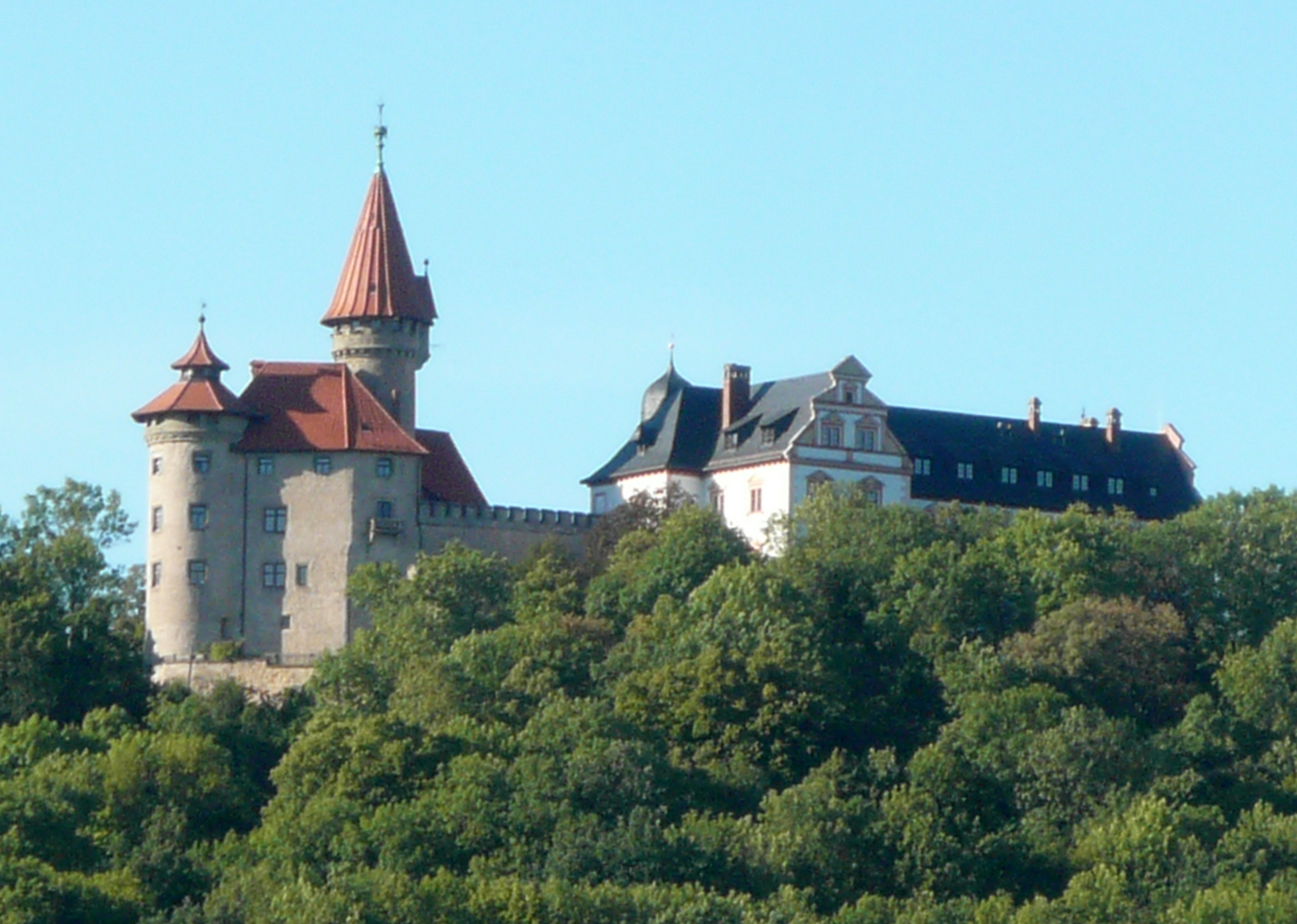
- The German Castle Museum at Heldburg Fortress
- Established: 9 September 2016
- Location: Veste Heldburg, Heldburger Land, Hildburghausen, Thuringia, Germany
- Type: Historical museum

The German Castle Museum (German: Deutsches Burgenmuseum) is a history museum at Heldburg Fortress in the region of Heldburger Land and in the county of Hildburghausen in the German state of Thuringia.

The exhibition contains a wealth of information about life in castles and about castle architecture in the Middle Ages. The museum has 40 rooms and covers an area of 3,000 square metres in the Französischer Bau (French building) of the fortress.

In 2005, a support association was founded for the museum. It is composed of the Germanic National Museum, the Thuringian Foundation of Palaces and Gardens and the German Historical Museum, also the district Hildburghausen, the city of Bad Colberg-Heldburg, South Thuringia Chamber of Commerce and other associations and companies.

Initially, the opening of the museum was planned for 2011; however, the renovation work was delayed, and the construction work for the renovation of the fortress was started in June 2009. The construction costs were estimated at four to seven million euros in 2009. The museum finally opened on 8 September 2016 and is now open to the public. The opening ceremony of the German Burgenmuseum took place on 8 September 2016. Since September 9, 2016, the museum has been opened for regular visitor traffic.
