= Straufhain =

- Municipality
- Coat of arms

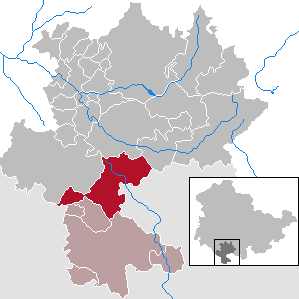
- Location of Straufhain within Hildburghausen district
- Interactive map of Straufhain
- Location within Germany Location within Thuringia
- Coordinates: 50°21′N 10°41′E
- Country: Germany
- State: Thuringia
- District: Hildburghausen
- Municipal assoc.: Heldburger Unterland

Government
  - Mayor (2019–25): Tino Kempf

Area
  - Total: 57.41 km^{2} (22.17 sq mi)
- Elevation: 315 m (1,033 ft)

Population (2025-12-31)
  - Total: 2,677
  - Density: 46.63/km^{2} (120.8/sq mi)
- Time zone: UTC+01:00 (CET)
  - Summer (DST): UTC+02:00 (CEST)
- Postal codes: 98646
- Vehicle registration: HBN
- Website: www.gemeinde-straufhain.de

Straufhain is a municipality in the Hildburghausen district of Thuringia, Germany.

== Municipality subdivisions ==
- Adelhausen
- Eishausen
- Linden
- Massenhausen
- Seidingstadt
- Sophienthal
- Steinfeld
- Stressenhausen
- Streufdorf
