= Eucharius Hoffmann =

Eucharius Hoffmann (? in Heldburg – 10 May 1588 in Stralsund) was a German composer and music theorist, Hoffmann was Kantor at Stralsund from 1566 until 1580.

== Works and collections ==
- Eucharius Hoffmann. Musicae practicae praecepta communiora. Wittenberg, 1572
- Eucharius Hoffmann. Doctrina de tonis seu modis musicis. Greifswald, 1582

Collections:

- Eucharius Hoffmann. XXIV Cantiones, quatuor, quinque 4-6v. Wittenberg, 1577
