= Heldburger Unterland =

- Verwaltungsgemeinschaft
- Map of Hildburghausen highlighting Heldburger Unterland
- Interactive map of Heldburger Unterland
- Location within Germany Location within Thuringia
- Coordinates: 50°18′N 10°40′E
- Country: Germany
- State: Thuringia
- District: Hildburghausen
- Seat: Heldburg
- Subdivisions: 6 municipalities

Area
  - Total: 215.62 km^{2} (83.25 sq mi)

Population (2025-12-31)
  - Total: 7,243
  - Density: 33.59/km^{2} (87.00/sq mi)
- Time zone: UTC+01:00 (CET)
  - Summer (DST): UTC+02:00 (CEST)
- Website: www.vg-heldburgerunterland.de

Heldburger Unterland is a Verwaltungsgemeinschaft ("collective municipality" or "community of administration" ) in the district of Hildburghausen, in Thuringia, Germany. The seat of the Verwaltungsgemeinschaft is in Heldburg.

The Verwaltungsgemeinschaft Heldburger Unterland consists of the following municipalities:

1. Heldburg
2. Schlechtsart
3. Schweickershausen
4. Straufhain
5. Ummerstadt
6. Westhausen

The municipality Straufhain became member of Verwaltungsgemeinschaft Heldburger Unterland on 31 December 2013.
