= Heldburger Land =

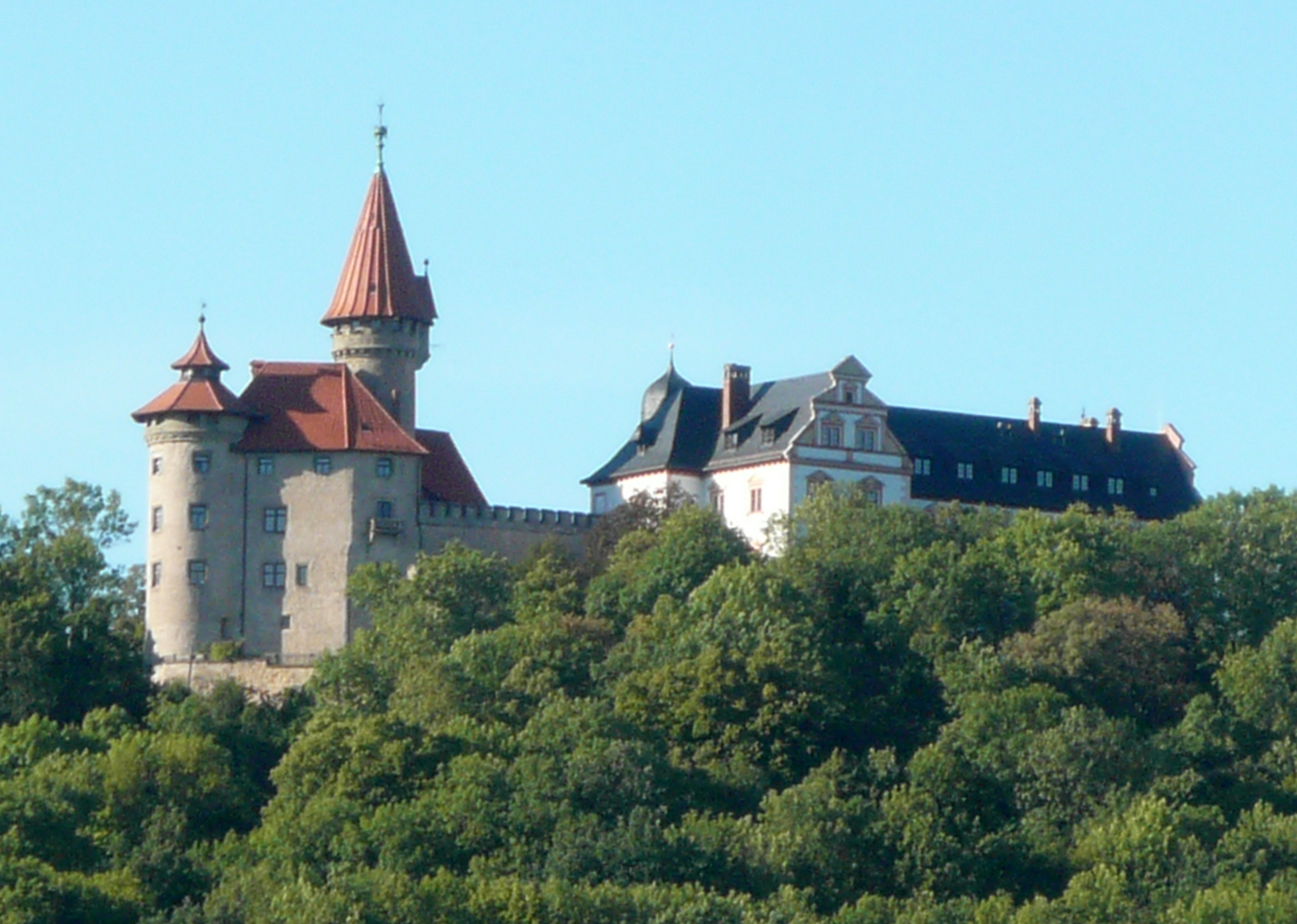
Veste Heldburg or Heldburg fortress in Heldburger Land in district Hildburghausen in South Thuringia

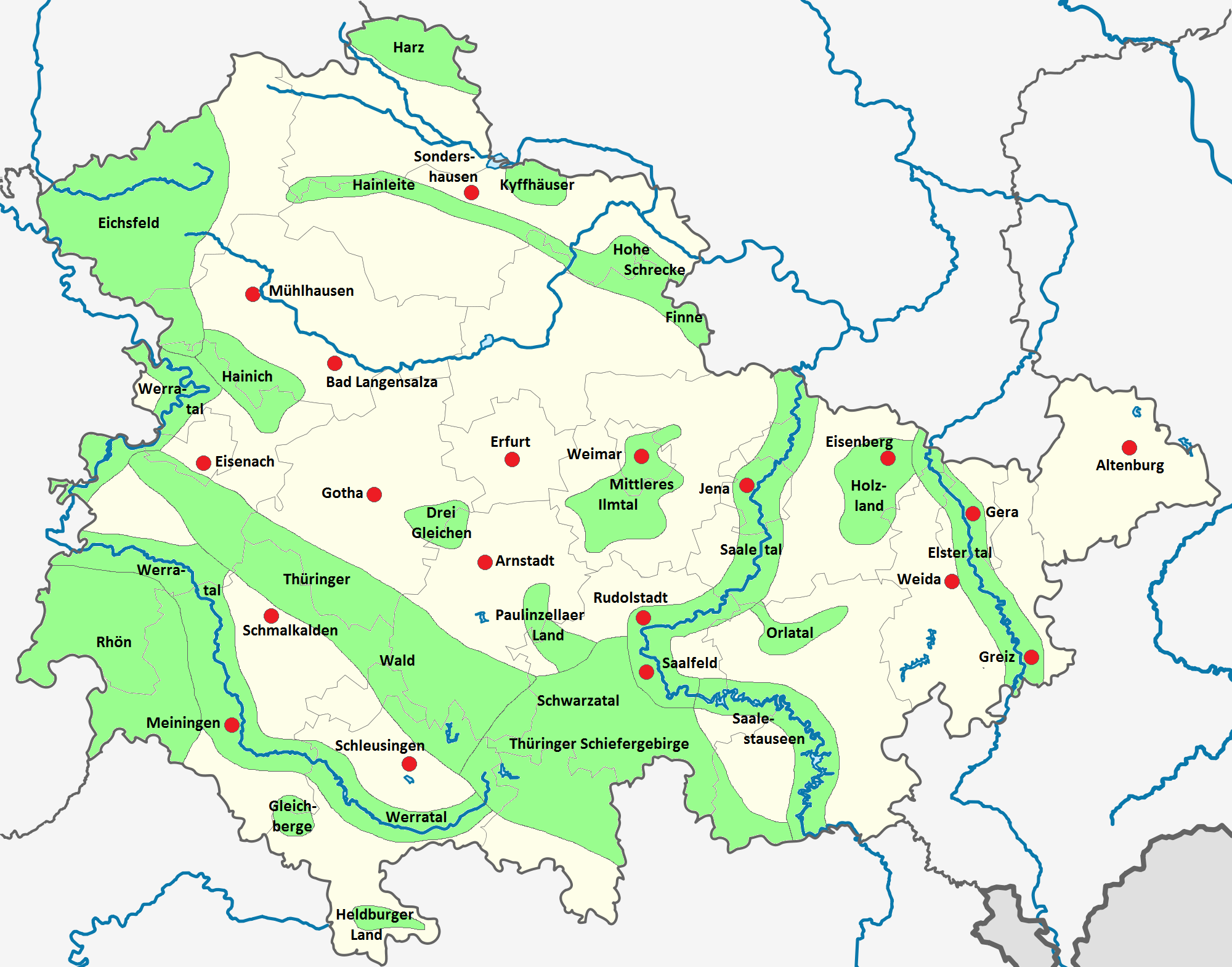
Regions of Tourism of Thuringia

The Heldburger Land was the historical, Saxon, administrative district (Amtsbezirk) of Heldburg (borough of Heldburg) and is today the southernmost part of the Free State of Thuringia and the district of Hildburghausen, between the towns of Coburg, Hildburghausen and Bad Königshofen. The region known now as the Heldburger Land is referred to administratively as the Heldburger Unterland (Heldburg Lowlands), and sometimes in the vernacular as the Heldburger Zipfel (Heldburg Tip).

The Heldburger Land is enclosed on three sides between the northern areas of the Bavarian provinces of Lower Franconia and Upper Franconia and is bordered to the west by the district of Rhön-Grabfeld, in the south of the county of Hassberge and on the east by the district of Coburg. The total area is about 120 sq mi (c. 190 km^{2}). The Heldburger Land is a mainly agricultural region with many forest. Its main river is the Kreck, a tributary of the Rodach, crossing the district from North to south. The highest point in the Heldburger Land is the hill of Straufhain at, 1,473 ft (449 m), on the summit of which are the ruins of Straufhain Castle. The landmark of the Heldburger Land is Heldburg Fortress on the hill of Burgberg, 1,325 ft (404 m) high, a castle which is over 700 years old with a famous Renaissance building, called Französischer Bau. It was built in 1560/1564 by Nikolaus Gromann, a famous Thuringian master builder. On September 8, 2016, the Deutsches Burgenmuseum (German castle museum) was opened on the Veste Heldburg.

== History ==
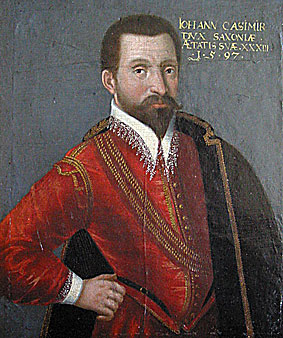
Casimir Duke Johann of Saxe-Coburg, 1597, oil on wood, castle Callenberg nearby Coburg

The earliest written messages on individual settlements of Heldburger Land come from the Frankish settlement time in Grabfeldgau : in 776 Westhausen and in 783 Hellingen first mentioned in documents of the monastery of Fulda in the 9th century and in other documents Heldburg and Ummerstadt. First and probably secular religious centre of the Heldburger Land was Westhausen. In addition, the mention of his early Kilian Church points to the mission of the Irish monks in Franconia. The temporal power of the dukedom East Franks practiced long from the Counts of so-called Popponen. The Abbey of Fulda later lost their influence in the diocese of Würzburg. After the first turn of the millennium the Thuringian Landgraf house grew, merged with the gender of the Popponen and the Henneberg dynasty took power, was the headquarters Henneberg Castle near Meiningen. Soon after, have Henneberger influence in Heldburger Land, in the area of the castle Strufe, obtained, in the territory of the Diocese of Würzburg. The powers of both dynasties have overlapped for centuries. Poppo VI resided at Strufe Castle, today the ruins of Straufhain. It was also a county. In 1317 is one cent and the district court moved to Heldburg Castle and Strufe Castle (Strauf) lost its former importance. Still under the dynasty of Henneberger was the new administrative centre, it consisted of the Centen Heldburg and Hildburghausen .

Duke John Casimir of Saxe-Coburg used the castle as a hunting lodge for decades. On the occasion of his marriage (nuptials) with Margaret of Brunswick-Lüneburg in September 1599 stayed here numerous guests of the Duke, beside the bride Princess Margaret of Brunswick-Lüneburg also Margrave Georg Friedrich I of Brandenburg -Ansbach - Kulmbach, Duke Ernst II of Braunschweig- Lüneburg, Duke Wilhelm Kettler of Courland and Semigallians and Duke Johann Ernst of Sachsen -Eisenach, each with their entourage.

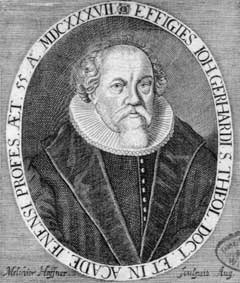
Johann Gerhard

Johann Gerhard 1606 received his doctorate in theology and went to Heldburg, where he became superintendent. He worked at a teacher at the high school in Coburg. He led the country through Coburg'schen church visitations and developed in 1615 the church order there again. In the same year Duke Johann Casimir appointed him as General Superintendent to Coburg. On February 24, 1615, Gerhard held in Heldburg his farewell sermon, and took up his new post in Coburg.

After several conquests and plundering in the Thirty Years' War the castle was held in 1776 and re- attached residence of the Ernestine dukes of Saxe- Hildburghausen and finally in 1871 the property of the Meininger royal house. Duke George II of Saxe-Meiningen restored the Veste Heldburg in 1874–1898. He lived from time to time with his wife Helene Baroness of Heldburg. The actress Ellen Franz Courtyard of the castle Veste Heldburg, 1872, left the French building(Französischer Bau). Duke Bernhard II of Saxe-Meiningen abdicated from 1918, but the ducal family retained right of residence in the secondary residence of the castle Veste Heldburg. The Duchies of Saxe-Meiningen and Saxe-Coburg and Gotha were extinguished and the Free States of Saxony -Coburg and Saxe-Meiningen emerged. The former Coburg rule closed in 1920 after a referendum on the state of Bavaria. The Amt Heldburg came to the newly formed Free State of Thuringia. Thus, the existing condition until today had occurred, that the Heldburger tip is surrounded on three sides by Bavarian region. Another chapter in the history of the Heldburger Land under the rule of the Wettin dynasty lasted since 1374 came to an end. Since the Thirty Years' War, the Amt Heldburg had 40 years to the Duchy of Saxe-Gotha belongs (1640–1680), 146 years to the Duchy of Saxe-Hildburghausen (1680–1826) and further 92 years to the area of the duchy of Saxe -Meiningen (1826–1918).

== Geography ==
The dominant flowing water is the river Kreck, which is a source Streufdorf, three other tributaries are named Westhäuser, Gompertshäuser and Gellershäuser Kreck. Coming out of the Holzhäuser Tal (valley of Holzhausen) brook Saarbach nearby Heldburg in the Kreck. In Hellinger Tal running the river Helling and flow south of the Heldburger Land at Autenhausen in the Kreck. The Kreck flow in Bavaria in the area at Gemünda in the Rodach(Itz). In the East, crosses the river Rodach (Itz), whose source is near Hildburghausen, multiply the border between Thuringia and Bavaria. All mentioned rivers carry their waters ultimately in the Upper Franconian Itz, which finally empties into the Main.

Of standing water, there are several small ponds next to the memory pond at Rieth (20 ha), the memory Westhausen (20 ha) and two small storage at Hellingen. In ancient times the Heldburger Land had a lake under the castle Veste Heldburg. Today's meadows at the confluence of the Saarbach in the Kreck were flooded and made the Heldburger or Hundshauker See (lake) of approximately 25.5 ha with a thriving fish. The Duke of Saxony-Meiningen George I. (reigned 1782–1803) made a new agricultural policy and left many waters in the Duchy of Meiningen dry place, including this lake.

== Communities ==
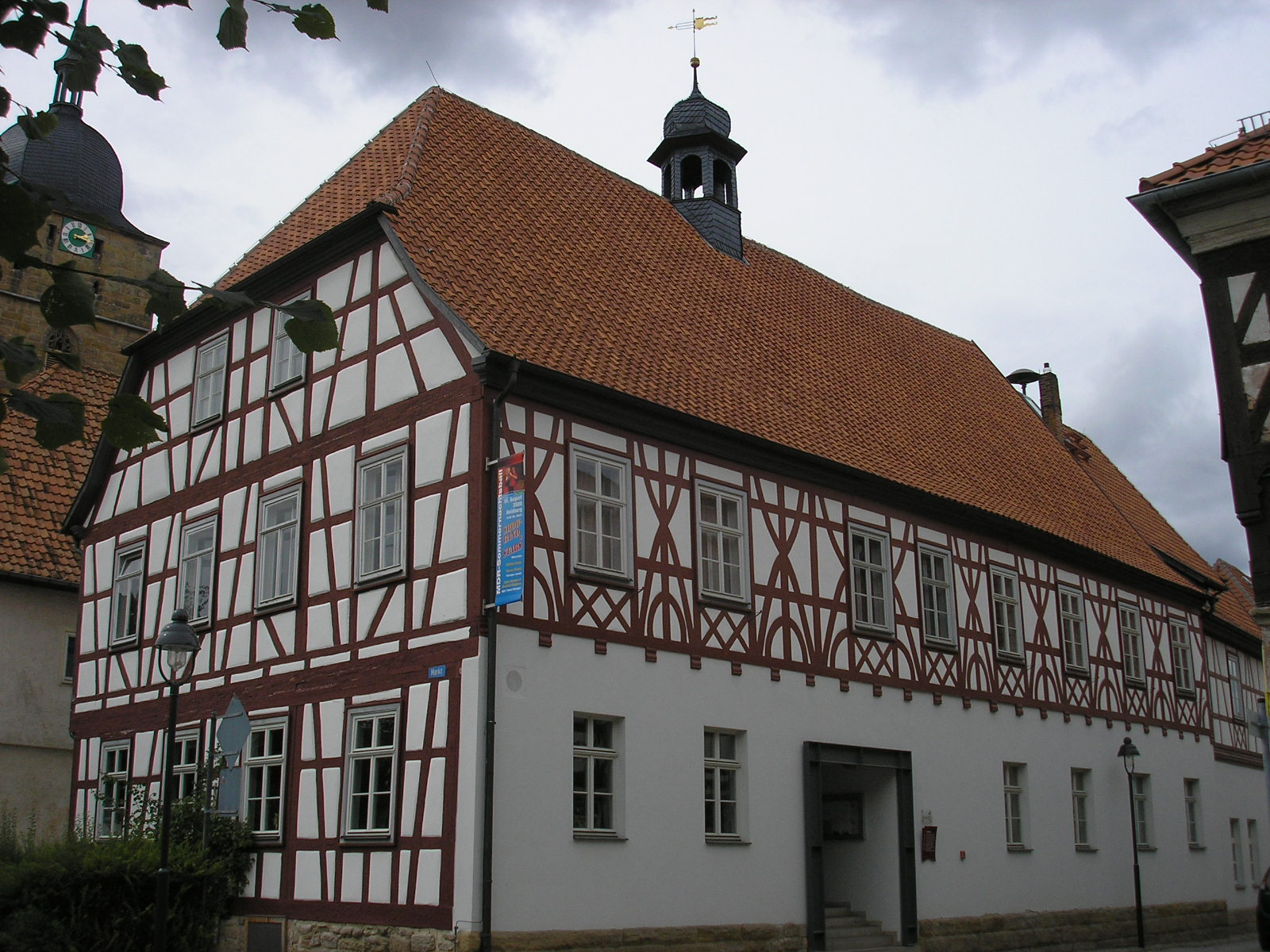
Town hall of Heldburg

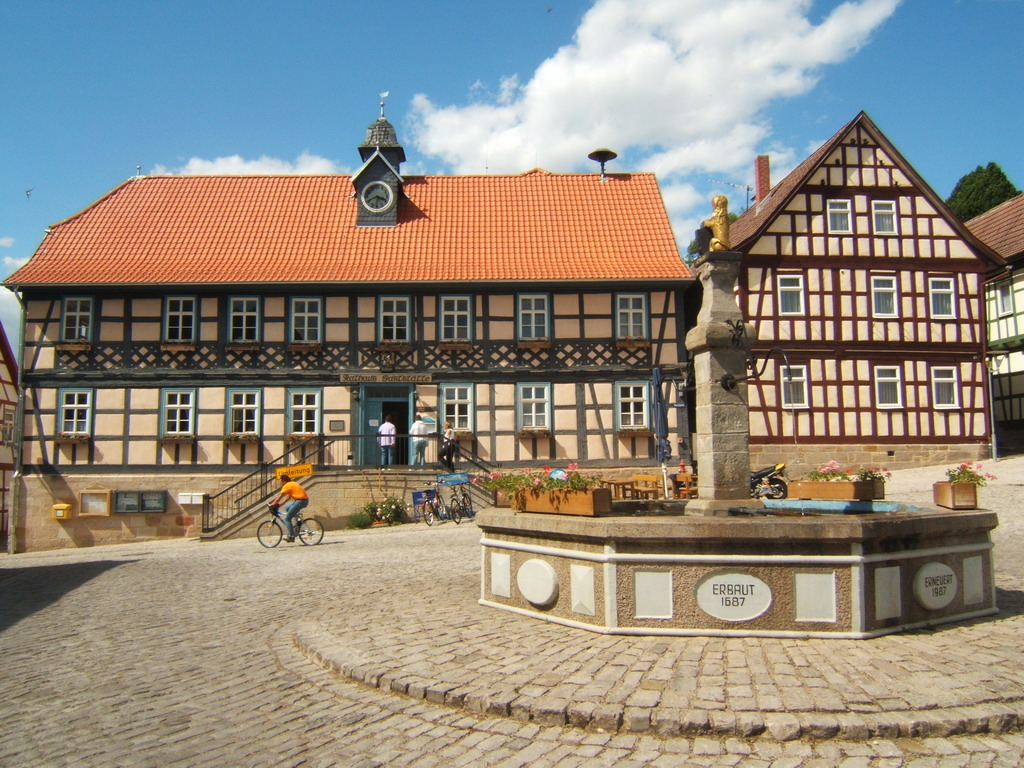
Town hall of Ummerstadt

- Albingshausen, part of the municipality Hellingen
- Bad Colberg, part of the town Bad Colberg-Heldburg
- Billmuthausen, memorial on the inner German border (political deserted)
- Einoed, part of the town Bad Colberg-Heldburg
- Erlebach, memorial on the inner German border (political deserted)
- Friedrichshall, part of the municipality Lindenau
- Gellershausen, part of the town Bad Colberg-Heldburg
- Gompertshausen
- Haubinda, part of the municipality Westhausen
- Heldburg, part of town Bad Colberg-Heldburg
- Hellingen
- Holzhausen part of the town Bad Colberg-Heldburg
- Kässlitz, part of the municipality Hellingen
- Leitenhausen, memorial on the inner German border (political deserted)
- Linden, part of the municipality Straufhain
- Lindenau part of the town Bad Colberg-Heldburg
- Poppenhausen, part of the municipality Hellingen
- Rieth, part of the municipality Hellingen
- Schlechtsart
- Schweickershausen
- Seidingstadt, part of the municipality Straufhain
- Streufdorf, part of the municipality Straufhain
- Ummerstadt
- Völkershausen, part of the town Bad Colberg-Heldburg
- Volkmannshausen, part of the municipality Hellingen
- Westhausen

Municipal law have Ummerstadt (issued twice: from rulers Henneberg before 1347, rulers Saxon 1394) and Heldburg (rulers Saxon 1394). Bad Colberg has since 2002 the state recognition as an Ort mit Heilquellen und Kurbetrieb (place of healing springs and cure).

== Geology ==
Geologically, the Heldburger Land Keuper area with strong pitches, sandstone and basalt deposits breakthroughs (hill Straufhain, the nearby hills Gleichberge nearby Römhild). All breakthroughs are of volcanic origin. The Heldburger Castle Hill is also made of basaltic rock that phonolite (Sparkling Stone) is called. Basalt is the entire area north and west of Heldburg to the surface. Several basaltic veins traverse the landscape, some of them close to the surface over long distances. The most famous of which is called the devil or hell wall and runs from Gleichamberg to Trappstadt and on to the Main river. Geologists call the many dot-like running from northeast to southwest basalt veins Heldburger Gangschar. Keuper (or Kipper) is a term for coburgische colored marl and sandstone is composed of sand, clay and carbonate sediments. Clay and limestone were subject to more erosion, while the more resistant sandstones stopped as back and hilltops.

== Mineral resources ==
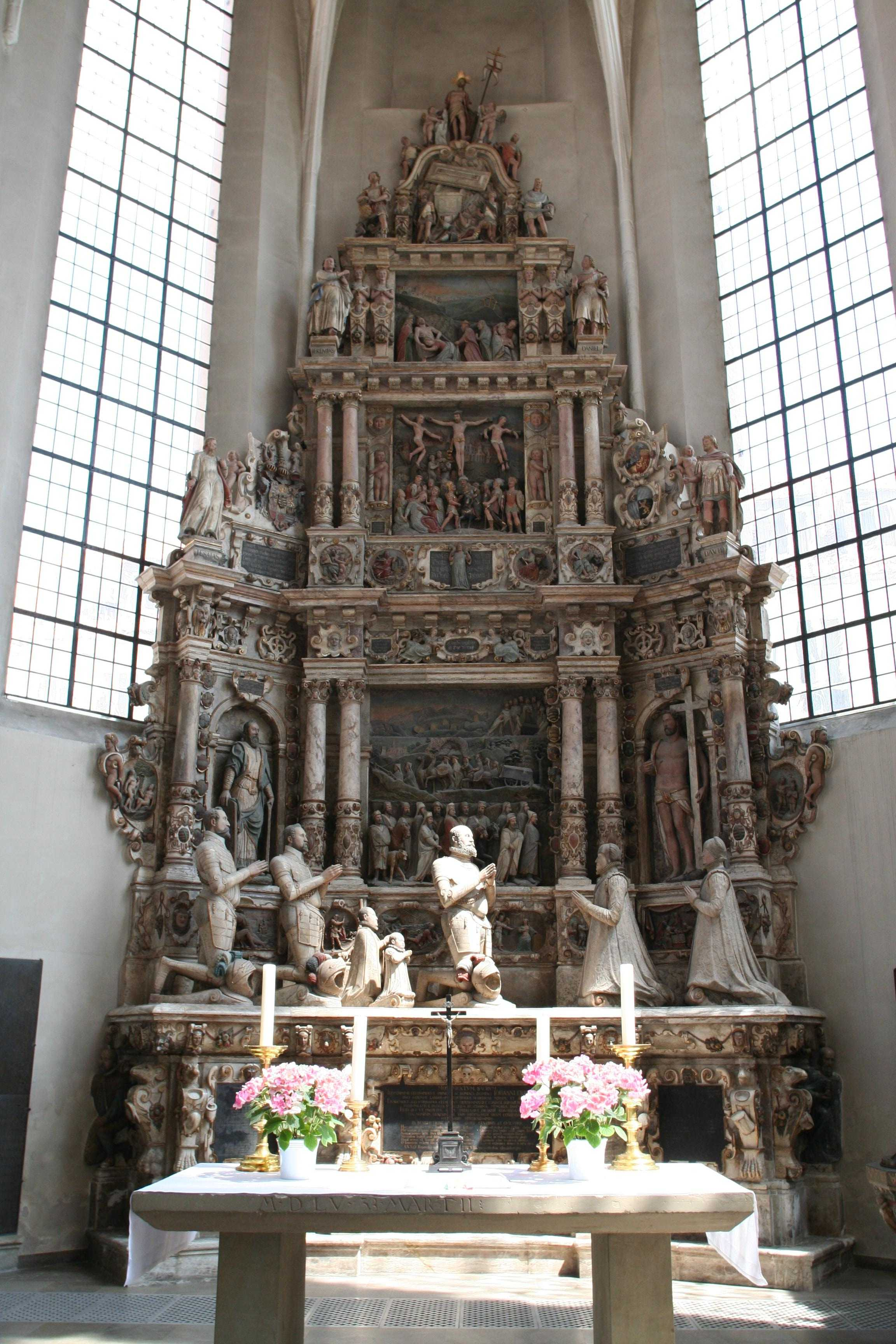
Renaissance epitaph in church St. Moriz in Coburg

In 1665 10 quarries, 12 clay pits and 13 brick kilns were operated lodges in the district Heldburg. Were clay pits to the 20th century used in Ummerstadt for pottery, the craft has gone out. The outcropping sandstone was or is mined in several places as so-called Coburger Festungs- Bausandstein. A series of sandstone benches lead fossil deposits, then they are called Semionotus Sandstein. As a companion of the sandstone layered plaster in various states in the ground. He was formerly mined as fertilizer in the early days he was sought after for stucco. In some places, gypsum alabaster is found, a marble-like more or less translucent gypsum. Between Heldburg and Hellingen (Kreitberg or Amyssenhügel) he is of immaculate white hard enough for sculptures. The choir of St. Moriz Church was endowed by John Casimir in 1598 in the honor of his parents with one of the most beautiful Renaissance epitaphs in Germany – a 12-metre-high (39-foot) alabaster monument with a richly sculptured series of pictures. For alabaster from Heldburg sculptor Nikolaus Bergner from Heldburg made the epitaph. By gypsum layers seeping groundwater sources is with a bitter taste, a common phenomenon in Heldburger Land, which led to problems in the drinking water supply. They tried to use the bitter water. Most productive were drilled sources for centuries served (with interruptions) for bitter or bitter salt water bottling at Lindenau.

== Administrative units ==
- Management community Heldburger lowlands (2 cities and 5 municipalities)
- Unified community Straufhain (9 districts, including here Streufdorf, Seidingstadt and Linden to Heldburger country counted)
- Bad Colberg-Heldburg (7 Districts)
- Unified community Hellingen (5 districts)

== Population ==
- City Bad Colberg-Heldburg: 2,098 inhabitants (Census 2011)
- Community Hellingen: 1,039 inhabitants (Census 2011)
- Community Westhausen: 549 inhabitants (Census 2011)
- City Ummerstadt: 492 inhabitants (Census 2011)
- Community Gompertshausen: 456 inhabitants (Census 2011)
- Community Schlechtsart: 166 inhabitants (Census 2011)
- Community Schweickershausen: 152 inhabitants (Census 2011)
- Community Straufhain: 2,795 inhabitants (Census 2011) ²

Total population of Heldburger Land: 6,382 inhabitants (2011 Census and the above estimate)

² which about 1,430 to Heldburger Land (estimated percentage)

== Nature reserves and monuments ==
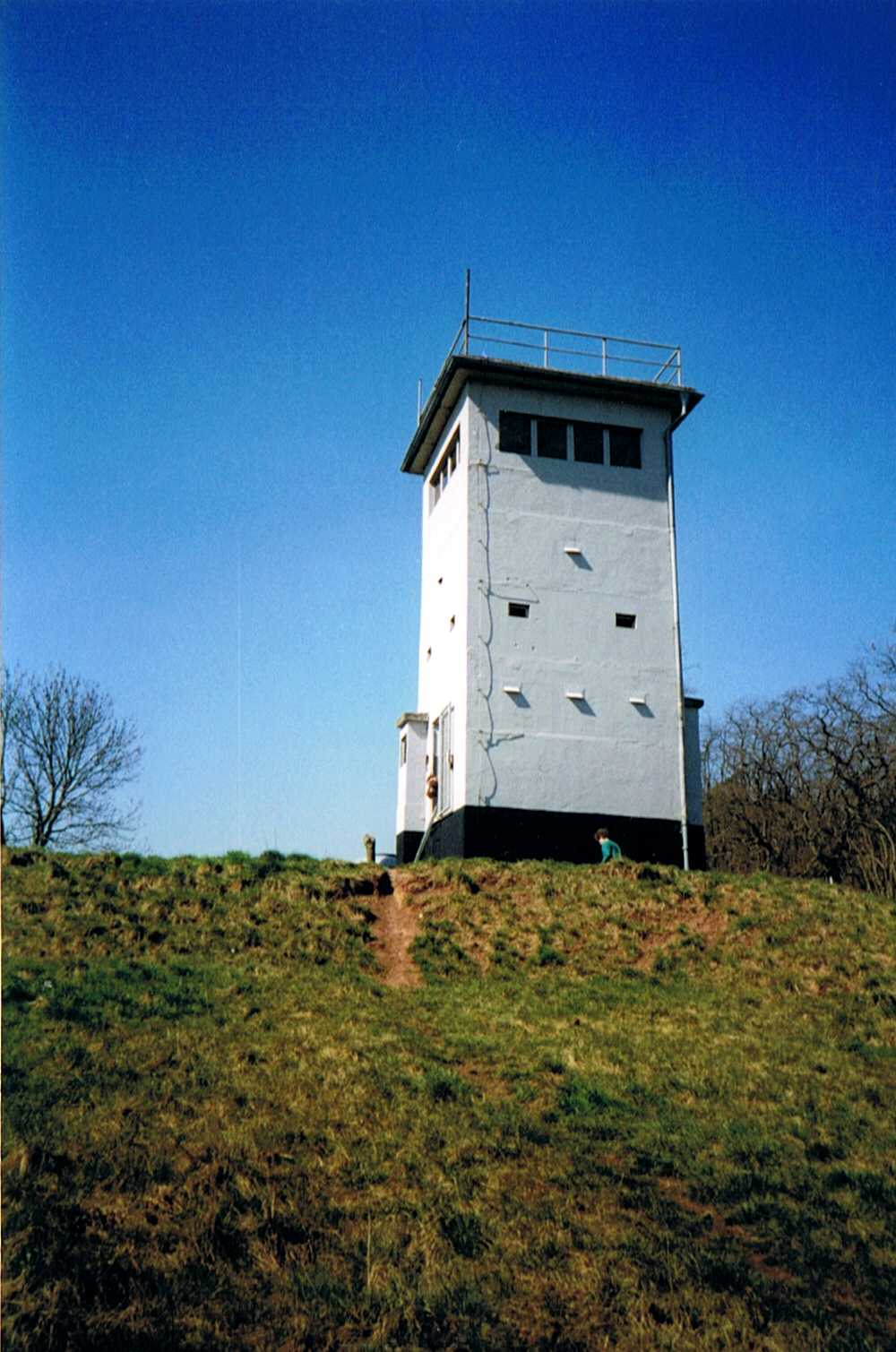
Lodge for bats and birds in previous watch tower in Billmuthausen

- European bird sanctuary Rodachaue with Bischofsau and Althellinger Grund reserve of European importance, part of the Natura 2000 network of protected areas
- Nature reserve Alster Grund with border strip at Kässlitz
- Lange Berge Nature Reserve in Schweickershausen
- Nature Reserve: Althellinger Grund and Kreckaue
- Flora-Fauna-Habitat area forests in grave field: forest Straufhain at Streufdorf, part of the Natura 2000 network of protected areas
- Natural Monument Weidenallee in Friedrichshall (Lindenau)
- conservation, research and cultural monument in the Grenzturm Billmuthausen

== Forests ==
The Forest Service Heldburg is the southernmost forest office in Thuringia with 6 forest districts. For Heldburger Land include the forest districts Ummerstadt, Heldburg, Hellingen, Rieth and partially Straufhain. The forests of the region are characterized by oak forests and a high proportion of local forests. Deciduous forests dominate in many places the forest image. The natural forest communities are Luzulo and bedstraw-oak-hornbeam forests with different levels of involvement of beech and deciduous woods. The forests are often mixed stands. In addition to the main tree species spruce, pine, oak and beech occur in different proportions in many other species, such as larch, hornbeam, sycamore, lime trees or wild service trees. The Forest Service is on three growth areas. The largest part (47%) takes on the Fränkischer Keuper south of the line Streufdorf a Linden. The Forest Service Heldburg is a focal occurrence of oak in Thuringia. Grapes and oak have a share of 22% in the total demand for construction Itz-Baunach- Hügelland.

== Wild plants ==
The flora of the Heldburger Land is rich in species. Particularly attractive and not more frequently encountered in Germany plant communities found on the basalt mountains. In the shade of oak-hornbeam forests thrive there contiguous areas of arum, lily of the valley, primroses, liverworts, forget-me-not and ramsons. At the castle hill of Heldburg, at Straufhain, at Hexenhügel and at the more distant hills Gleichberge wear these in the spring lush carpets of flowers. Large parts of forests as protected areas reported. Despite intensive agriculture, large contiguous forests have received, where mushrooms, blueberries (the blackberries one here called), blackberries and raspberries can thrive undisturbed. A particular reservoir, the in the past few decades between the boundary fences growing vegetation represents, for botanists interested in immediately after the opening of the border. it is a retreat now rare plants for which one naturally protective Solutions sought. Soon the Green Belt, which is now a strip biotope was instead of the ugly border surrounds the Heldburger Land.

== Animals ==
Particularly striking here is the variety of bird species. Species such as red-backed shrike, yellowhammer, whitethroat and whinchat is the attentive observer almost everywhere in the Green Belt. The bluethroat has increased significantly in some areas. Chance sees tree hawks, great grey shrike in southern Thuringia, and the locally occurring buntings. The artificial reservoirs of Heldburger Land offer many marsh and water birds while passing train suitable rest facilities. Extensively used on wet grassland and meandering streams of some occurrence of breeding bird species are known rejected. Examples include, in particular, the state endangered species lapwings, snipe and corncrake. The bluethroat regarded as threatened with extinction a few years ago can be observed in Heldburger Land again. To undisturbed streams, the beaver's home again. The extensive oak stands allow the survival of an endangered insect: stag beetle.
