= Maistre Jhan =

French composer at the court of Este in Ferrara, Italy

Maistre Jhan (also Jehan, Jan, Ihan) (c. 1485 – October 1538) was a French composer of the Renaissance, active for most of his career in Ferrara, Italy. An enigmatic figure, of whom little biographical information has yet emerged, he was one of the earliest composers of madrigals as well as a prominent musician at the Este court in the early 16th century.

== Biography ==
Nothing is known of his early life, other than that he was French, for the earliest reference to him in the records of the Este court in Ferrara are as a "singer from France." He received his first payment from them in 1512, and remained employed there until his death 26 years later. During that time, as evident from the number of dedications made to him and favorable commentary in the records, he must have been honored; and he was maestro di cappella, choirmaster, for an unknown amount of the time. Several contemporary writers, including influential music theorist Adrianus Coclico, mention him as an expert composer.

Several composers with similar names have been confused with Maistre Jhan. Pioneering 19th-century French musicologist François-Joseph Fétis mistook him for Jhan Gero; records at Ferrara seem to identify him with Jehan le Cocq and Johannus Gallus, people who have since been determined to be separate individuals; a Maistre Jhan in Verona has turned out to be Jan Nasco.

== Works and influence ==
While famous during his time, Jhan's work has largely faded into obscurity. He wrote in most of the genres current in the early 16th century, including, in sacred vocal music, masses (all but one of which are lost), motets, and lamentations. In style the sacred music is similar to the work of Josquin des Prez (died 1521), using imitative passages alternating with homophony. Jhan wrote his one surviving setting of the mass for the accession to the dukedom of Ercole II d'Este (1534); it uses cantus-firmus technique.

Jhan's secular music includes madrigals and at least one chanson. The madrigals appear in publications from 1530 to 1550; his five madrigals published in 1530, along with works by Philippe Verdelot, are part of the first book of madrigals ever to be published with that name. In 1542 three of his madrigals appear alongside composers such as Costanzo Festa, Francesco Corteccia, and Hubert Naich; the style of his works is similar to that of Verdelot, and represents the earliest stage of the genre, before it developed its peculiar individuality.
