= Oltremontani =

Oltremontani ("those from over the Alps") were those of the Franco-Flemish School of composers who dominated the musical landscape of Northern Italy during the middle of the sixteenth Century. The role of the oltremontani composers at the ducal courts of Italy was analogous to the dominance at the Spanish court of the Flemish chapel (capilla flamenca), and other composers of the Franco-Flemish School in Germany and France.

In the sacred field the works of the Oltremontani are similar to the Ars Perfecta style of previous generations in the Low Countries, and to their countrymen in Spain and Germany. But in the field of secular music the Oltremontani, Flemish composers in Italy, were quick to progress and adapt Italian vernacular forms. It was partly the Flemish polyphonic "northern heritage" which raised the indigenous frottola and villota into the late-renaissance, early-baroque 4 and 5 voice madrigal and laid the foundation for Marenzio, Monteverdi and Carlo Gesualdo. The first madrigals for 3, 4 and 5 voices were primarily written by Flemish composers in Italy, such as Philippe Verdelot, in Florence, Jacques Arcadelt in Venice, though the first madrigal collection, in 1530, also included works by a native Italian, Costanzo Festa. The madrigal genre was taken up by Adrian Willaert, Cipriano de Rore, Giaches de Wert, Giovanni de Macque and, although he was based in Munich, the pan-European publishing phenomenon that was Orlando di Lasso.

The zenith of the influence of the Oltremontani can perhaps be indicated by the tenure of the Flemish musicians Albertus Francigena 1485–1491, Petrus De Fossis 1491–1527, and Adrian Willaert from 1527, in the preeminent post of maestro di cappella of St Mark's Basilica. Likewise the beginning of the end of that preeminence is signalled by the resignation of Cipriano de Rore from the same post in 1565, in favour of Gioseffe Zarlino, with Andrea Gabrieli as organist, both of whom were students of Willaert. Henceforth the Low Countries, and the rest of Europe, would look to Italy as the leaders in the musical innovation during the 17th Century.
