= Hubert Naich =

Flemish composer

Hubert Naich (Huberti, Huberto; Naixh, Naxhe) (c. 1513 – c. 1546) was a composer of the Renaissance, probably of Flemish origin, principally active in Rome. He was mainly a composer of madrigals, some in the note nere style.

== Life ==
He was probably from Liège, although the details of his early life are uncertain, since several musicians bearing the name "Naich" were active at the church of St. Martin during the time he would have been growing up.

Details of his life for the period in which he was in Rome are equally uncertain. It is known that he was active as a composer of madrigals from approximately 1540 to 1546, during which time he almost certainly knew the renowned madrigal composer Jacques Arcadelt, then singing in the Sistine Chapel choir, since they were both members of an "academy of friends" gathered around Bindo Altoviti, a Florentine banker who was resident in Rome (Arcadelt's membership in the group is uncertain, but considered probable). One of Arcadelt's Venetian publications, his Il quinto libro di madrigali (Fifth Book of Madrigals) (1544), includes six pieces by Naich, further indicating a connection between the two.

A painting entitled "The Three Ages of Man" (now lost), possibly by Sebastiano del Piombo, was believed to have shown a likeness of Naich, as the eldest of the three figures in the painting.

== Music ==
All of Naich's known music is for voices, and almost all of it is secular. His entire surviving output has been published in volume 94 of Corpus mensurabilis musicae. Forty-five compositions are known, including 30 in a volume of madrigals he published in Rome in 1540 (Exercitium seraficum, all for from four to six voices). He also published 12 madrigals in other collections, such as the one with Arcadelt. The other three compositions are a chanson in French, and two motets, evidently his only sacred compositions to survive.

Some of his madrigals are in the note nere (black note) style. This style of composition, which began with the work of Costanzo Festa around 1540, used shorter note values than were previously used in madrigal composition (hence "filled in" note-heads, i.e. black notes) and quick syllabic declamation, often with syncopation. These Italian "patter-songs" had a burst of popularity in the 1540s, mainly in Venice and the surrounding cities, but Naich's compositions show that they were known and written in Rome as well. Naich's madrigals in this style usually begin with passages in longer note values, only gradually progressing into the quick "note nere" style. As such, they were part of an increasing trend in the 1540s among madrigal composers, who were seeking greater expressiveness by exploiting rhythmic and tonal contrast.
