= Hoste da Reggio =

Italian composer

Hoste da Reggio (also L'Hoste, L'Osto, Oste, and Bartolomeo Torresano) (c. 1520–1569) was an Italian composer of the Renaissance, active in Milan and elsewhere in northern Italy. He was well known for his madrigals, which were published in several collections in Venice.

== Life ==
He was from Reggio nell'Emilia, the son of an innkeeper. Little is known about him prior to 1540, but he received a good musical education. In 1540 he was in Milan, and during the 1540s he made the acquaintance of the nobility and the ecclesiastical powers there. The governor of Milan, Ferrante Gonzaga, hired him in the 1540s; the exact post is not known but may have involved overseeing the music at the church of Santa Maria della Scala. He stayed in the good graces of the Gonzaga family, but when the governor was deposed by the Duke of Alba in 1554 during the Italian War of 1551–1559 he lost his job.

In 1555 he acquired a prebend at S. Calimero, also in Milan, and three years later he attained the prestigious position of maestro di cappella (choir director, the highest musical post) at Milan Cathedral. In 1563 he resumed his previous duties at S. Calimero, staying there until 1567, when he left Milan for Bergamo, where he served as maestro di cappella at Santa Maria Maggiore. He died there after only two years.

Unusually for Renaissance composers, a painting survives of him. It is anonymous, and in a private collection in Brescia: it shows him, dressed as a priest, holding open one of his books of madrigals.

After his death his name was sometimes named on reprints of his works as Spirito L'Hoste, though this name was not used in his life. This may be due to confusion with another composer, Gasparo Pratoneri, "Spirito da Reggio."

== Music and influence ==
Hoste da Reggio's style showed many of the characteristics of the mid-century madrigal, which was at that time evolving along several different paths. He published his madrigals in five volumes in Venice between 1547 and 1554.

Some of the methods of madrigal composition common around 1550 which can be found in Hoste's music include chromaticism, unusual chord progressions, especially around cadences, and note nere (black-note) writing. In the note nere style, quick passages (written in filled-in notes, i.e., "black" notes) alternate with slower-moving sections, often in extreme contrast. Another stylistic strain evident in Hoste's writing is the "arioso" manner, in which one or more of the voices sings in a more declamatory style, anticipating later developments in the century such as the solo madrigal, and an increasing importance of soprano and bass parts; prior to this time, especially in the contrapuntal style of the Franco-Flemish school in the 1540s, absolute evenness of parts was an ideal, in which no one part predominated in the texture.

Occasionally he used a repeating melody in the soprano line, with the lower parts accompanying it differently each time it recurs. This most likely shows the influence of Francesco Corteccia, the famous musician and madrigalist to the Medici in Florence, who was consciously melding art and popular music styles. The procedure of using a simple repeating line in this manner was to be revived in the Baroque era, most often as a ground bass, and again in the cantatas of J.S. Bach.

Hoste also published a book of magnificats and motets; this one collection of sacred music (1550) appeared in Milan instead of Venice.
