= Bernardo Pisano =

Italian composer

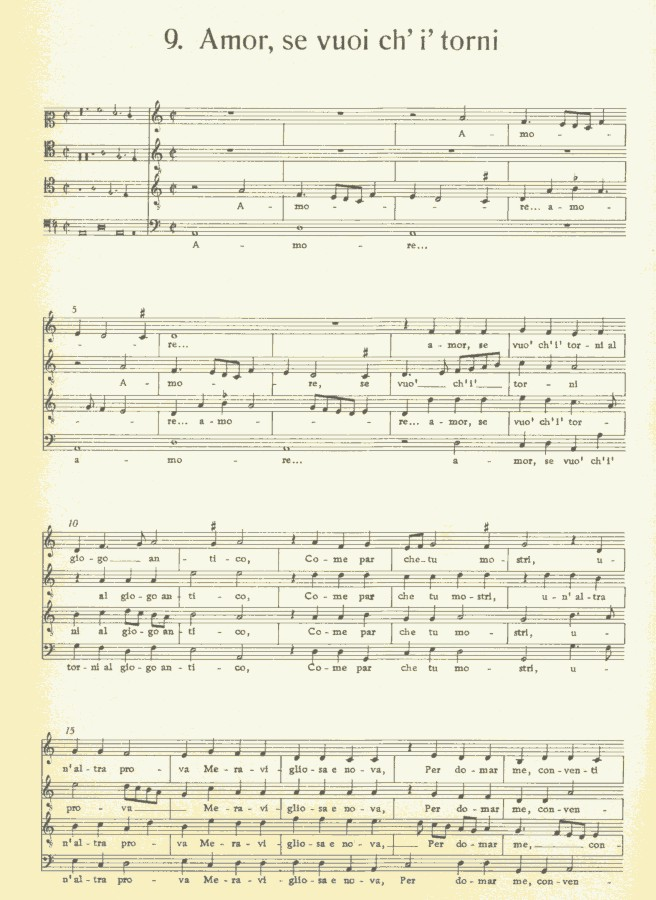

Bernardo Pisano (also Pagoli) (October 12, 1490 – January 23, 1548) was an Italian composer, priest, singer, and scholar of the Renaissance. He was one of the first madrigalists, and the first composer anywhere to have a printed collection of secular music devoted entirely to himself.

== Life ==
He was born in Florence, and may have spent some time in Pisa (hence his name). As a young man, he sang and studied music at the church of Annunziata in Florence. In 1512 he became maestro di cappella there, a job which held in addition to supervising the choristers and singing in its various chapels. Evidently, he was favoured by the Medici, for they not only hired him for his church job but gave him a post as a singer in the papal chapel in Rome in 1514, immediately after Cardinal Giovanni de' Medici became Pope Leo X. Sometime during the period 1512 to 1520, he was the teacher of Francesco Corteccia, organist and composer to Cosimo I de' Medici.

Pisano remained based in Rome for the rest of his life. In addition to singing in the papal chapel choir, he acquired ecclesiastical benefices from the Pope, including one each at the cathedrals of Seville and Lerida. Between 1515 and 1519 he travelled between Florence and Rome, holding musical positions in both cities, but in 1520 he returned to Rome, except for occasional visits to Florence.

Pisano made the mistake of returning to Florence in 1529, during the three-year period of republican government, the result of a successful coup d'état against the Medici. Since he had obviously close connections to the Medici, he was accused of being a spy for the papacy, seized, imprisoned, and put to torture. In September 1529 the famous siege of Florence began, and he was released. In 1530 Florence was captured by papal troops and the Medici returned to power. After escaping alive from his former home, he returned to Rome to stay.

In 1546 Pope Paul III appointed him maestro di cappella of his private chapel, a position which he only held for two years, for he died in 1548. Among the singers in this elite group was Jacques Arcadelt, who was to become even more famous than Pisano as a madrigal composer.

== Music and influence ==
While Pisano wrote sacred music in a sober, homophonic style, probably intended to be used during his tenure as maestro di cappella at Ss. Annunziata, it was as a composer of secular music that he was most influential. Pisano is arguably the first madrigalist. In 1520, Venetian printer Ottaviano Petrucci published his Musica di messer Bernardo Pisano sopra le canzone del Petrarcha, a collection of settings of Petrarch influenced by the literary theories of Pietro Bembo; while the pieces in the collection were not yet called "madrigals", they contained several features recognized in retrospect as distinctive of the genre: the set serious texts, the placement of words and accents was done carefully, and they contained word-painting. This publication was also the first collection of secular music by a single composer ever to be printed; previous publications, in the brief two decades since moveable type had first been used for printing music, had been anthologies only.

The slightly later composers who became famous masters of the madrigal genre — Costanzo Festa, Jacques Arcadelt, Philippe Verdelot — were aware of his work and copied some of his stylistic traits.

Pisano's early secular music is typical of Italian music of the first two decades of the 16th century: light, rhythmically active, usually homophonic, containing frequent repetition, and generally for three voices. Most of these pieces are ballatas or canzonettas. His later secular music, including the important collection of 1520, the first printed book of secular music dedicated to the work of a single composer, contains music which is best defined as madrigalian (although he did not use the term). Poetry is sometimes serious, and sometimes humorous; seven poems by Petrarch are represented. The music carefully attempts to convey the emotion expressed by the poem being set. Often the last line of the text is repeated for emphasis, a peculiarity which was to become a defining feature of the early madrigal. Texturally, the music varies between homophonic and polyphonic passages, as well as between passages for groups of two, three, and four singers together.
