= Veggio =

Veggio is an Italian surname. Notable people with the surname include:

- Andrea Veggio (1923–2020), Italian Roman Catholic bishop
- Claudio Veggio (born c. 1510), Italian Renaissance composer
- Maffeo Vegio (1407-1458), Italian Poet who wrote in Latin
