= Giandomenico Martoretta =

Italian composer

Giandomenico Martoretta (also Giandominico, La Martoretta, Il Martoretta; Mileto 1515–1560s?) was an Italian Renaissance composer. Little is known of his life, but the style of the dedication of the "master of theology" Giovanfrancesco di Chara in the second book indicates that Martoretta may have been minor gentry or member of an academy. But the preface to the third book of madrigals reveals that he had made a pilgrimage to the Holy Land and stayed in Cyprus as guest of a certain noble cavaliere, Piero Singlitico. His first book of madrigals was written in the rapid note nere, black note, style introduced by Constanzo Festa. Theodor Kroyer (1902) believed that Martoretta's madrigals demonstrated chromatic keys.

== Editions ==
- Il primo libro di madrigali cromatici a quattro voci (1548) Gardano, Venice.
- Il secondo libro di madrigali cromatici a quattro voci (1552) edited by Maria Antonella Balsano, Firenze, 1988 (Musiche Rinascimentali Siciliane Vol.11).
- Il terzo libro di madrigali cromatici a quattro voci (1554)
