= Francesco de Layolle =

Italian composer

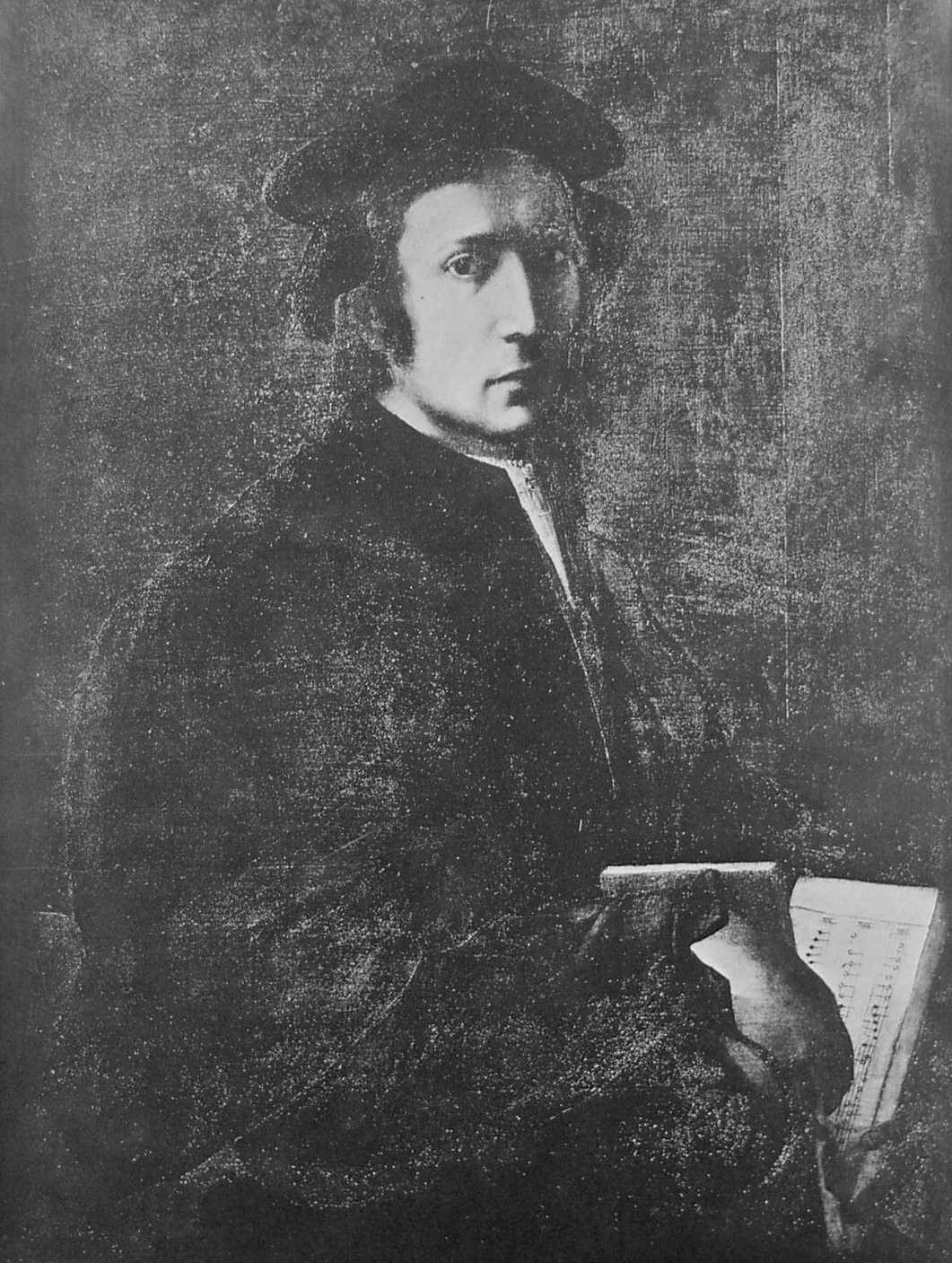
Francesco de Layolle, in a painting by Jacopo da Pontormo (1518)

Francesco de Layolle (also spelled dell'Aiolle, dell'Aiuola, dell'Ajolle, dell'Aiolli), (March 4, 1492 – c. 1540) was an Italian composer and organist of the Renaissance. He was one of the first native Italian composers to write sacred music in the Franco-Flemish polyphonic style, combining it with the indigenous harmonic idioms of the Italian Peninsula.

== Life ==
He was born in Florence. In 1505, around the time of his 13th birthday, he joined the choir of the church Ss. Annunziata in Florence, where his teacher was the distinguished composer to the Medici family, Bartolomeo degli Organi. Layolle eventually married his teacher's younger sister-in-law, Maddalena Arrighi. In 1518 he left Florence, settling in Lyon in 1521. While in Florence he also served as a music teacher to sculptor Benvenuto Cellini, who referred to him as a superb organist, musician, and composer.

Layolle remained in Lyon for the rest of his life but retained a number of friends in Florence, including several men who conspired to overthrow the Medici in 1521. After the failure of the plot and the uncovering by the Medici of the perpetrators, the conspirators fled Florence, finding refuge in Lyon with Layolle, who was able to shelter them without fear of prosecution. In the subsequent trial they were all condemned in absentia, but Layolle escaped censure; the reason for this is not known, but he never did return to Florence.

His duties in Lyon included playing the organ at the cathedral of Notre Dame de Confort; in addition, he composed and edited music for some of the printing organizations there. One of his close associates was Jacques Moderne, the second-best-known printer in France after Pierre Attaignant. Much of Layolle's music was published by Moderne, but much of it has since been lost.

The 1540 date of Layolle's death is probable, but no death or burial records remain. A lament on his death was published in 1540, and Layolle's last compositions were also published in that year.

== Music ==
While much of Layolle's music is lost, that which remains is generally progressive in style, melodic, and finely crafted. Most of his sacred music was published by Moderne, however, no copies remain of 61 motets and at least three masses.

He was one of the first composers to blend the Franco-Flemish and Italian styles. Prior to the early 16th century, most polyphonic sacred music was written by northerners, and Italians focused mainly on the lighter secular forms, and some uniquely Italian forms such as the laude spirituale; however in the early 16th century native Italian composers such as Layolle, and later Costanzo Festa, began to blend the northern polyphonic style with the Italian harmonic and tonal idioms, a blending which eventually resulted in the musical style of Palestrina and Lassus.

Two books of madrigals have survived, although he called them "canzoni". Some are in Italian and others in French, and more closely related to the contemporary chanson than the Italianate madrigal. At least one of the madrigals he wrote, Lasciar il velo, became hugely popular in Europe and appears in many geographically scattered sources, both as a vocal piece and in instrumental transcription.
