= Sebastiano Festa =

Italian composer

Sebastiano Festa (ca. 1490–1495 – 31 July 1524) was an Italian composer of the Renaissance, active mainly in Rome. While his musical output was small, he was one of the earliest composers of madrigals, and was influential on other early composers of madrigals, such as Philippe Verdelot. He may have been related to his more famous contemporary Costanzo Festa, another early madrigal composer.

== Life ==
He was from Villafranca Sabauda in the Italian province of Piedmont, not far from Turin; his father, named Jacobinus, was a musician resident in Turin in the 1520s. Jacobinus was probably Festa's teacher. While it is tempting to suggest that he was the younger brother or other relation of the much more famous Costanzo Festa, since they were from the same region, had similar musical acumen and both wrote madrigals, no direct evidence of this has emerged. Sebastiano first appears in the record in a manuscript copied between 1516 and 1519, possibly as the copyist: the document contains motets both by himself and Costanzo.

He lived and worked in Rome in the early 1520s, with the Genoese aristocrat Ottobono Fieschi as his patron, and he worked with other musicians connected with Pope Leo X. Costanzo Festa had been a singer in the Sistine Chapel choir since 1517, so both Festas may have come to Rome at approximately the same time. Sebastiano received a canonicate at Turin Cathedral in 1520, but he died at Rome on 31 July 1524.

== Music and influence ==
Only fourteen compositions have been securely attributed to Sebastiano Festa: four motets and ten madrigals. Another seven madrigals are considered doubtful. Similarities in style between Sebastiano's and Costanzo's work have made some of the identification difficult. All of his works are for four voices, and most of the madrigals he published in a single volume in 1526 in Rome, Libro primo de la croce: canzoni, frottole et capitoli, by printers Pasoti and Dorico at the publishing house of Giacopo Giunta.

Most of Festa's madrigals retain textural characteristics of the earlier Italian secular form, the frottola, particularly in their use of homophony and syllabic writing; however, what distinguishes them from the frottola and allows the label of "madrigal", is their patterning on the French chanson, then becoming influential in Italy; their refusal to repeat the same music for different lines of text, and their use of poetry such as that by Petrarch, an influence of Cardinal Pietro Bembo, the literary inspiration for the new madrigal form, who was working in Rome at the time.

These works, simple as they are, were influential on other early madrigalists such as Philippe Verdelot, who produced his first madrigals around the same time or shortly after Festa. One of Festa's madrigals, O passi sparsi, based on a sonnet by Petrarch, acquired some fame beyond Festa's limited circle. It was copied in many manuscripts up to mid-century, and appeared in instrumental arrangements as well. Claudin de Sermisy, the French chanson composer, even based a parody mass on it – a common fate for a "good tune" in the sixteenth century. Albert de Rippe made an arrangement of this song for the lute, and Diego Pisador made an instrumental arrangement for the vihuela in his "Libro de Music de Vihuela" (Salamanca, 1552) under the title of "[Cancion Francesa] Sparci sparcium".
