= Girolamo Parabosco =

Italian composer

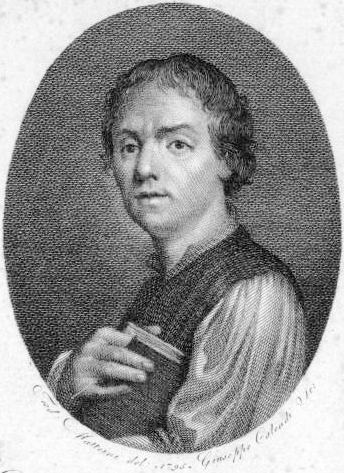
Girolamo Parabosco

Girolamo Parabosco (c. 1524 – April 21, 1557) was an Italian writer, composer, organist, and poet of the Renaissance.

He was born in Piacenza, the son of a famous organist, Vincenzo Parabosco. Little is known of his childhood, but he went to Venice early for his musical education and is mentioned as a student of Adrian Willaert, the founder of the Venetian School, near the end of 1541. In 1546 he visited Florence as a guest of Francesco Corteccia, musician to the Medici and the leading musician of that city. After a period of travels, during which he visited other cities in northern Italy, he returned to Venice and became first organist at St. Mark's, which was at that time becoming one of the most distinguished musical institutions in Italy. He remained employed by St. Mark's for the rest of his life, and died in Venice in 1557.

He wrote Rime and prose comedies, but he is best known by I Diporti, a collection of stories after the model of Boccaccio's Decameron supposed to be told by a fowling-party weatherbound on an island in the Venetian lagoons.

Of his compositions, a book of madrigals for five voices, published in Venice in 1546, remains, as well as four other madrigals published in 1541 and 1544, and some instrumental music. The style of the madrigals is similar to that of Willaert, but even more densely polyphonic than that of his teacher; they are more akin to motets than to most of the madrigals being written in Italy in the early 1540s. One of his instrumental works is a ricercar based on "Da Pacem", the antiphon for peace; it may have been written for the end of the war in 1540 between Venice and the Ottoman Turks.
