= Jhan Gero =

Franco-Flemish composer

Jhan Gero (also Ghero, Giero; first name rendered occasionally as Jehan, Jan) (fl. 1540–1555) was a Franco-Flemish composer of the Renaissance, apparently active mainly in Italy, particularly Venice. He was a practitioner of the note nere madrigal style during its period of popularity in the 1540s, and also wrote didactic music, probably intended for teaching beginning singers.

== Life ==
Nothing is known about his early life, but it is inferred that he was from northern Europe, perhaps Flanders, as were many musicians of the time who were working in Italy. He seems to have risen to prominence through the efforts of the Venetian publishing company run by Antonio Gardano and Girolamo Scotto; they may have paid him to make arrangements of works by others, as indicated by his first publication, in 1541, which contained Italian madrigals and French chansons, originally for three or four voices, however in this case arranged for only two singers each. This particular publication went through numerous reprints, all the way until the end of the 17th century.

Gero was employed at some unknown time as maestro di cappella for Pietro Antonio Sanseverino, the Prince of Bisignano, according to the dedicatory epistle to Gero's 1555 book of motets. After this year, during which he published two books of motets, no further records of his life or activities have yet come to light.

== Music and influence ==
In the 1540s, after his initial assumed employment with Gardano and Scotto, Gero published two books of madrigals in the then-popular note nere (black note) style. In music of this style, black notes referred to quick note values (i.e. filled-in note heads, as in modern quarter-notes rather than half-notes); quick passages alternated with slower ones, and syncopation was common.

Gero's music was widely distributed, being popular in Italy as well as Germany.
