= Bartolomeo degli Organi =

Italian composer

Bartolomeo degli Organi (24 December 1474 – 12 December 1539) was an Italian composer, singer and organist of the Renaissance. Living in Florence, he was closely associated with Lorenzo de' Medici, and was music teacher both to the Florentine composer Francesco de Layolle and Guido Machiavelli, the son of the famous writer.

== Life ==
He was born in Florence, and seems to have spent most of his life there. He was a singer in the cathedral of Santissima Annunziata from 1488, and was appointed as a singer in the baptistry chapel by Lorenzo de' Medici himself. In addition he worked as an organist at several locations in Florence, finally obtaining the position of organist at the cathedral in 1509, a position he retained for the rest of his life.

Bartolomeo was well-connected with the artistic and cultural life in Florence. In addition to being part of the circle of Lorenzo de' Medici, his friends included the poet Lorenzo Strozzi, and he was the music teacher of the son of Niccolò Machiavelli. He also may have been one of the teachers of Francesco Corteccia, the most prominent Florentine musician of the middle of the 16th century.

Some of Bartolomeo's children and grandchildren also became well-known musicians in Florence, including his sons Antonio, Lorenzo, and Piero, and his grandson Baccio degli Organi, a Florentine music teacher in the 16th century.

== Music and influence ==
Relatively little of Bartolomeo's music has survived. Only fifteen pieces are found in sources of the period: ten secular songs, a lauda, and four instrumental compositions. The songs are in the characteristic style of the popular music of the period, with simple rhythms, homophonic texture, clear phrasing, and they are in strophic form. Eight are ballatas. In spite of his close association with Ss Annunziata, only a single sacred composition has survived, the lauda Sguardate il Salvatore, and that is probably an adaptation of a secular song.

Some influence of the Netherlands school is evident in his music: he used the tune of the famous chanson De tous biens plaine by Hayne van Ghizeghem in one of his instrumental pieces, and he also used motivic material by Alexander Agricola (who also worked in Florence in the early 1490s, and was possibly his teacher) in his instrumental music.
