= Claudio Veggio =

Italian composer

Claudio Maria Veggio (born c. 1510) was an Italian composer of the Renaissance, principally of secular music.

He was born in Piacenza, and must have spent most of his life there. Little is known about his life except for a brief period during the 1540s, when he was employed as a composer and harpsichordist for Count Federico Anguissola of Piacenza, at the Castell'Arquato. After this period of activity he vanishes from history; nothing further is known about him.

Veggio was an early composer of madrigals, of which two books have survived, published in Venice in 1540 (the first to formally feature note nere under the name misura breve) and 1544, for four and eight voices respectively. He was also a prolific keyboard composer of ricercars which alternate contrapuntal and highly ornamented passages. Stylistically they represent an intermediate stage between the early keyboard style of Marco Antonio Cavazzoni and the style of his son Girolamo Cavazzoni, who composed ricercars in the more modern sense of the word — i.e., as a series of imitative sections.

Of greatest significance to musicologists is a manuscript by Veggio which survived in the archives of Castell'Arquato. It appears to be a rough copy of his draft compositions, containing numerous sketches, strikeouts and revisions; it is one of the earliest such music manuscripts to survive, and provides a rare window into compositional procedures of the time. Many of the compositions are transcriptions for keyboard of vocal compositions, now lost, probably by other composers.

== References and further reading ==
- Articles "Claudio Veggio," "Ricercar," in The New Grove Dictionary of Music and Musicians, ed. Stanley Sadie. 20 vol. London, Macmillan Publishers Ltd., 1980. ISBN 1-56159-174-2
