= Gasparo Pratoneri =

Italian composer

Gasparo Pratoneri, nicknamed "Spirito da Reggio" (fl. 1556–59) was an Italian priest, and composer of the Renaissance based at San Prospero in Reggio Emilia. He was musical tutor to the nobleman composer Alfonso Fontanelli.

Pratoneri is often confused with his contemporary, the more famous "Hoste da Reggio," Bartolomeo Torresano, whose works sometimes appeared after his death named as "Spirito L'Hoste", even though this name was not used during his lifetime.
