= The Three Ages of Man (Giorgione) =

16th century allegorical painting by Giorgione

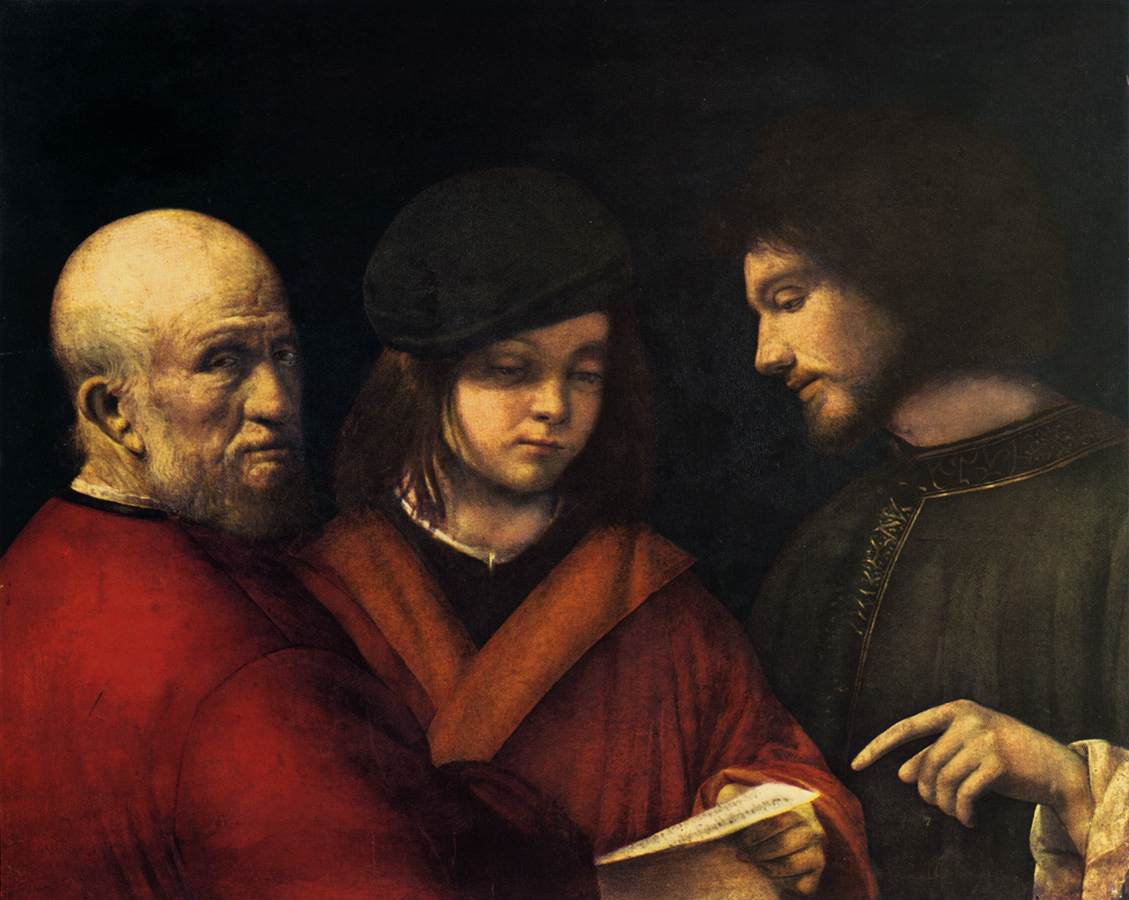
- Artist: Giorgione
- Year: c. 1500-1501
- Medium: oil on canvas
- Dimensions: 62 cm × 77.5 cm (24 in × 30.5 in)
- Location: Galleria palatina; Florence

The Three Ages of Man or Reading a Song is a 1500-1501 painting by Giorgione, now displayed at the Galleria Palatina within the Palazzo Pitti in Florence.

== History ==
The painting was first identified in a description by Marcantonio Michiel of the antique dressing room of Gabriele Vendramin, cited in a 1569 inventory. In 1657, the painting passed into the collection of painter Nicolas Régnier and from there it was bought by the Medici family between 1666 and 1675, where it entered the collection of Ferdinando de' Medici. This panel with a triple portrait was initially attributed to Jacopo Palma il Vecchio and then to a "Lombardic style." In 1880, Morelli was the first to re-attribute to work to Giorgione, a hypothesis mostly shared by critics.

== Description and style ==
The subject of the painting isn't clear. The title it has today is from the 17th century, but other hypotheses have suggested that the painting depicts a singing lesson or the education of a young Marcus Aurelius. The youth at the right has also sometimes been identified as a portrait of the musician Philippe Verdelot. Presumably, the same man is shown, represented in three moments of his life.

In the scene, there are three people, of different ages, on a dark background. The youth at center reads a folio on which are drawn two rules of a musical staff. The man to his left points to the music sheet, and an old man looks at the viewer of the painting.

The dark background contrasts with the incisive chromatic choices applied to the people. Their clothes and features emerge from the background gradually, with the "sfumato" effect typical of Leonardic works. Even the drafting with thin glazes comes from Leonardo da Vinci, with meticulous attention to details like the hair rendered with subtle brushstrokes.

The driving allegory, often present in works of Giorgione, is in this case music, the spiritual expression of man and the harmony of existence.
