= Note nere =

Note nere (English: black note) was a style of madrigal composition, which used shorter note values than usual and had more black note-heads.

The style was introduced around 1540, and had a short vogue among composers publishing in Venice including Costanzo Festa, Giaches de Wert, Cipriano di Rore and many minor composers, such as in the First Book (1548) of Giandomenico Martoretta.

The first note nere madrigals had appeared, unannounced, in 1538, in the music for the wedding of Cosimo de Medici, where four of seven canzone by Corteccia are note nere, and 1539 with two of the madrigals in Arcadelt's Fourth Book. The first publication to establish the pattern that title pages of the collections were often marked as madrigali a note nere, in contrast to conventional but unstated note bianche, was Claudio Veggio's book of 1540 - which was marked misura a breve; the same idea. Alfred Einstein interpreted this as "short measure".

The time signature of note nere madrigals was rather than (now the sign for alla breve). Pietro Aron, in his Lucidario (1545), states what would appear evident - that shorter black notes in should have evened out to longer white notes in, making the change in the notation merely cosmetic, but Glareanus noted that there was no strict proportion between C and C with a vertical slash. The common conclusion of scholars is that the notation was meant to signal contrast between very fast and very slow beats as part of the chromatic style.
