= Andrea Veggio =

Italian Roman Catholic Bishop (1923–2020)

- Titular Bishop of Velia
- Church: Roman Catholic Church
- See: Titular See of Velia
- In office: 1983 - 2001
- Predecessor: Antonio Mazza
- Successor: Incumbent
- Previous post(s): Prelate

Orders
- Ordination: 29 June 1947 by Girolamo Cardinale
- Consecration: 8 September 1983 by Giuseppe Amari

Personal details
- Born: 28 August 1923; Manerba del Garda, Italy
- Died: 6 June 2020 (aged 96); Negrar, Italy

Andrea Veggio (28 August 1923 – 6 June 2020) was an Italian Prelate of Catholic Church.

== Biography ==
He was born in Manerba del Garda, Italy and was ordained a priest on 29 June 1947. He was appointed auxiliary bishop to the Diocese of Verona on 1 August 1983, as well as titular bishop of Velia, and ordained bishop on 8 September 1983. He retired from the diocese of Verona on 8 September 2001. He died in the “Casa del Clero” of Negrar, Italy on 6 June 2020.
