= Francesco Corteccia =

Italian composer

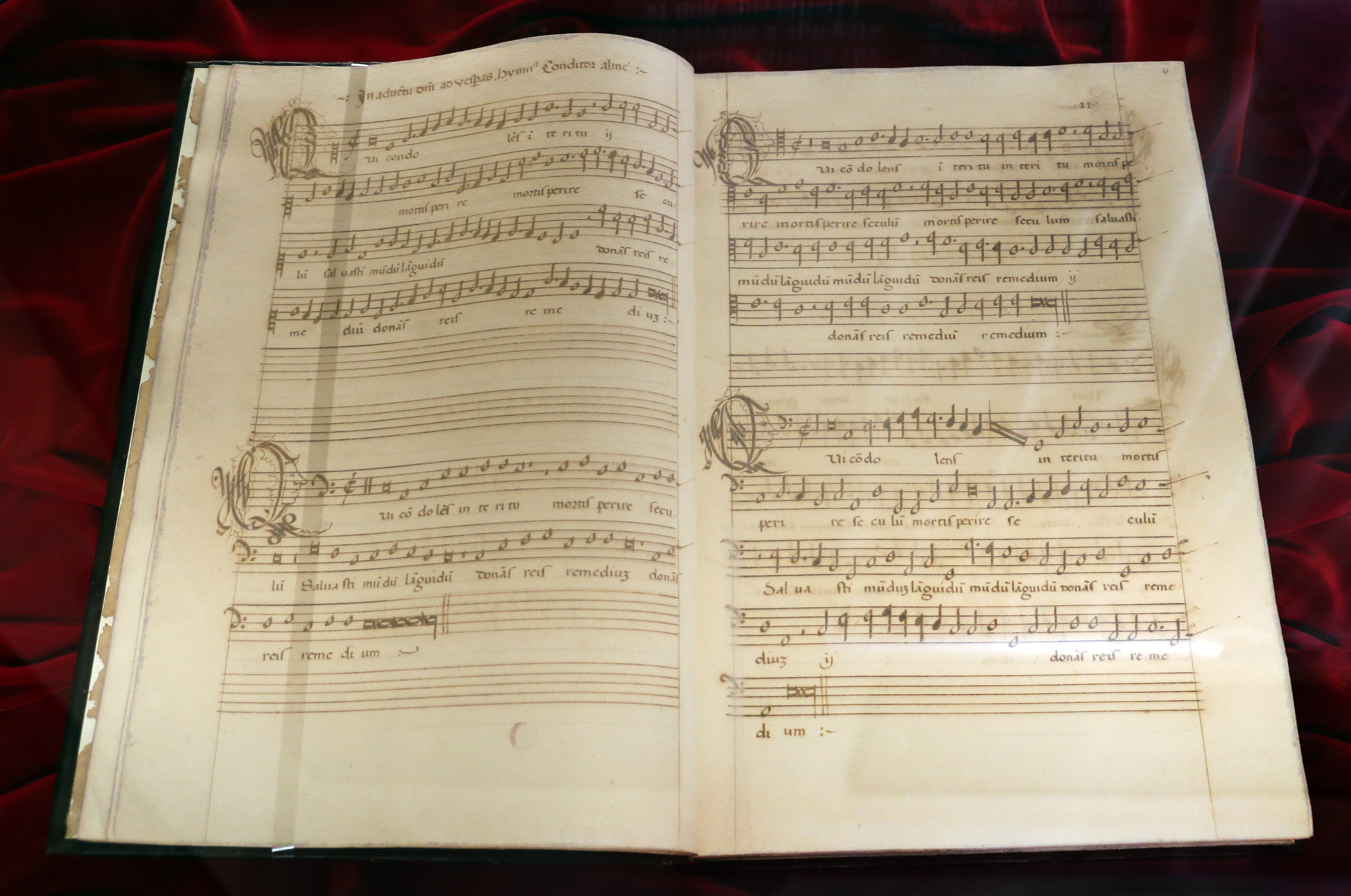
Francesco Corteccia, Hinnarium, Biblioteca Medicea Laurenziana

Francesco Corteccia (July 27, 1502 – June 7, 1571) was an Italian composer, organist, and teacher of the Renaissance. Not only was he one of the best known of the early composers of madrigals, and an important native Italian composer during a period of domination by composers from the Low Countries, but he was the most prominent musician in Florence for several decades during the reign of Cosimo I de' Medici.

== Life ==
He was born in Florence. By 1515 he was a choirboy and was enrolled in the cathedral school; around this time he probably studied organ with Bartolomeo degli Organi, and composition with Bernardo Pisano. On October 22, 1527, he became chaplain at the baptistry, and in 1531 entered indirectly into the employ of the Medici as both chaplain and organist at the church of San Lorenzo, the Medici family church. From 1535 to 1539 he was organist at San Lorenzo, and from 1540 until his death was maestro di cappella to the court of the Duke of Florence, Cosimo I de' Medici.

During his long tenure as maestro di cappella to the Medici, he gradually rose in position and prominence in Florence. In the chapel, he was successively chaplain, supernumerary canon, and canon; and in addition he held auxiliary positions such as chamberlain and archivist. In the 1560s he was replaced by Alessandro Striggio as the composer for most of the sumptuous musical productions of the Medici court, but he retained the position of maestro di cappella. Corteccia died in Florence in 1571, at the beginning of a period of musical decline at the Medici court.

== Music ==
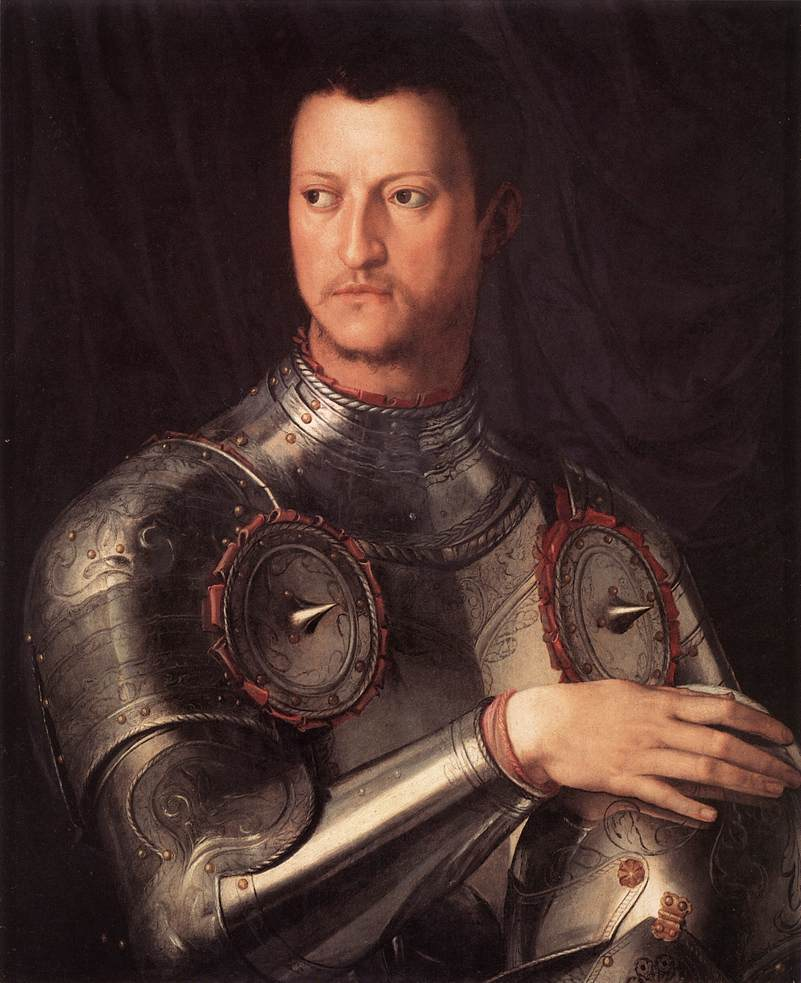
Portrait of Cosimo I de' Medici by Angelo Bronzino. Cosimo was a patron of the arts and music, and Corteccia's lifelong employer

The court of the Medici was one of the most opulent in Europe, and the Florentine family was keenly aware of their status and prestige, as shown by the artistic creations they inspired, ordered, or bought. Corteccia served the Medici for most of his life, and helped create some of the Medici's most elaborate entertainments. Later composers for the Medici, such as Alessandro Striggio, continued in the same vein, creating some of the largest and most extravagant polyphonic compositions of the entire era.

Corteccia wrote most of his music relatively early in his career; his production peaked in the early 1540s. His music is both sacred and secular, and much of it, unusually for a composer prior to the birth of opera, is specifically for the stage. He was also atypical among the first generation of madrigal composers in that he had a complete published collection of his music dedicated only to him: his First Book of Madrigals for Four Voices, published in Venice in 1544. Some of his madrigals differ from the usual vocal music of the time in having specifically indicated instrumental accompaniment, a result of being composed for theatrical occasions.

=== Sacred music ===
Corteccia's sacred music includes settings of the Lamentations of Jeremiah (lost), hymns, and many motets. While he wrote most of this music early in his career, the bulk of it was not published until 1570 and 1571, in Venice, possibly due to the lack of publishing capacity in Florence prior to that time. Corteccia wrote a letter for the dedication of the several volumes of motets, and in it indicated that he had been working on them and refining them for 30 years. Many of the modifications he made were in keeping with the liturgical reforms of the Council of Trent.

The hymn settings are mostly in responsory format, i.e., a verse is sung in plainchant, the next in polyphony, and then the formula repeats. Corteccia varies the texture in the polyphonic sections from strict imitation to free counterpoint, with occasional homophonic interludes, providing variety.

=== Intermedii and madrigals ===
As court composer to Cosimo de' Medici, Corteccia was required to write music, often intermedii, for various lavish court entertainments and spectacles, which often included weddings. Intermedii were sung interludes between acts of plays, with the most elaborate being those performed for state occasions. Often these interludes consisted of groups of madrigals, related to the subject matter of the play; in that they are staged, sung, and part of a dramatic production, they are seen as one of the predecessors of opera. One such intermedio by Corteccia was the set of seven madrigals he wrote for the wedding in June 1539 of Duke Cosimo to Eleonora di Toledo, descriptions of which survive in some detail. These madrigals, which were written for the play Il commodo by Antonio Landi, were sung in costume, with the singers playing nymphs, shepherds, mermaids, sea nymphs, and sea monsters (the three sea nymphs played flutes, while the sea monsters played lutes). The entire performance was elaborately orchestrated, with the singers variously accompanied by harpsichord, nightingale stop on the organ, bass viol, cornett, crumhorns, flutes, violin, violone, and a quartet of trombones. During the finale, no fewer than 20 bacchantes, mostly drunk and consisting of ladies and satyrs, were to come on stage singing and playing pipe, tabor, violin, harp, cornetts, crumhorns, and tambourine, and the performance closed with entrance and song by the personification of Night, accompanied by four trombones. The madrigals are also notable in that four of them, every alternate one, were the first in note nere rapid style.

The 1539 performance was one of many, but was one for which a detailed description survived. He also wrote, for example, a set of five madrigals in four voices to be performed between the acts of Francesco d'Ambra's comedy Il furto in 1544. Many of his madrigals are lost, but another surviving set, from 1565, was written in collaboration with Alessandro Striggio. In this set each composer contributed three madrigals; once again it was for a Medici wedding, and like the previous, was designed for performance between the acts of a play by d'Ambra.

Many of his published madrigals, for four to six voices, give no hint in the score of the extravagance of their original premières. They are full of textural contrast, as befits their dramatic origin. His earlier work shows the influence of the frottola, and often his style mimics Arcadelt's. The madrigals he wrote for the Medici weddings are often in a note nere, i.e. "black note" style: choppy rhythms, quick note values, sudden textural contrasts; in addition, they were usually designed for instrumental accompaniment, and consequently the soprano and bass lines often stand out. In this they foreshadow the development of monody by the Florentine Camerata later in the century.

=== International transmission ===
Some of Corteccia's music was sung far beyond the Italian peninsula. Certain of his villanellas, first published in Adrian Willaert's Canzone villanesche alla napolitana (Venice, 1545), were published in Erfurt, Germany in 1576 as part of the collection Cantiones suavissimæ quatuor vocum, antehac in Germania nunquam editae ("Sweetest songs in four voices, never before published in Germany"). The purpose of this volume, assembled by the Magdeburg cantor Leonhart Schröter (c. 1532–c. 1601) and with Latin texts by Ludwig Helmbold (1532–98), was to replace the erotically tinged Italian texts of the villanella with new, moralizing texts in Latin, that were seen as suitable for young students. For example, one of Corteccia's villanellas, Madonnʼio tʼhaggi amatʼet amo assai, was given the new text Ecce bonum licet, which encouraged the singer/listener to embrace a more religious lifestyle. This book, in turn, was used at the Latin school in Skálholt, Iceland, in the seventeenth century. The Icelandic manuscript Rask 98 (or "Melódía") contains the bass part of Corteccia's piece to an Icelandic text, "Vera mátt góður," which is a translation of the Latin "Ecce bonum licet" from the 1576 German edition.

== References and further reading ==
- Frank d'Accone, "Francesco Corteccia", Grove Music Online, ed. L. Macy (Accessed May 12, 2007), (subscription access)
- Andrew C. Minor, "Francesco Corteccia", in The New Grove Dictionary of Music and Musicians, ed. Stanley Sadie. 20 vol. London, Macmillan Publishers Ltd., 1980. ISBN 1-56159-174-2
- David Nutter, "Intermedio", Grove Music Online, ed. L. Macy (Accessed May 12, 2007), (subscription access)
- Gustave Reese, Music in the Renaissance. New York, W.W. Norton & Co., 1954. ISBN 0-393-09530-4
- Davitt Moroney, "Alessandro Striggio's Mass in Forty and Sixty Parts". Journal of the American Musicological Society, Vol. 60 No. 1., pp. 1–69. Spring 2007. ISSN 0003-0139
- Alfred Einstein, The Italian Madrigal. Three volumes. Princeton, New Jersey, Princeton University Press, 1949. ISBN 0-691-09112-9
- Árni Heimir Ingólfsson, "Una Villanella fiorentina in viaggio verso nord: Un caso di studio di trasmissione musicale". Dirigo, Rivista Musicale Dell'Andci, 2021.

== Selected Recordings ==
- Corteccia: Passione secondo Giovanne St. John Passion 1527, sung in Latin, with Evangelist's narrations spoken in Italian following Massimo Fiorentino's version of 1538. Schola Cantorum 'Francesco Coradini', dir. Fosco Corti Archiv. 1975
- Corteccia: Musiche fatte nelle nozze dello ill.ssimo Duca – Firenze 1539 Centre de Musique Ancienne di Ginevra, Studio di Musica Antica Antonio Il Verso di Palermo, Schola Jacopo da Bologna – dir. Gabriel Garrido. Tactus, 1995.
- Corteccia: Responsories I Cantori Lorenzo, Filippo Maria Bressan, Dynamic. 1999
- Corteccia: Bonum est confiteri Domino; Tu puer propheta altissimi. Le Concert Spirituel, dir. Herve Niquet. Glossa, 2012.
- Corteccia: Madonnʼio tʼhaggi amatʼet amo assai -- Vera mátt góður, Icelandic translation of "Ecce bonum licet," in the manuscript Rask 98/"Melódía" (ca. 1660). Carmina Chamber Choir, dir. Árni Heimir Ingólfsson. Crymogea, 2019.
