= Jacques Arcadelt =

Franco-Flemish composer of the Renaissance

- Born: 10 August 1507; Namur, County of Namur
- Died: 14 October 1568 (aged 61); Paris, France
- Occupations: Singer; composer
- Organizations: Sistine Chapel Choir; Paris Royal Chapel Choir
- Known for: Madrigals

Jacques Arcadelt (also Jacob Arcadelt; 10 August 1507 – 14 October 1568) was a Franco-Flemish composer of the Renaissance, active in both Italy and France, and principally known as a composer of secular vocal music. Although he also wrote sacred vocal music, he was one of the most famous of the early composers of madrigals; his first book of madrigals, published within a decade of the appearance of the earliest examples of the form, was the most widely printed collection of madrigals of the entire era. In addition to his work as a madrigalist, and distinguishing him from the other prominent early composers of madrigals – Philippe Verdelot and Costanzo Festa – he was equally prolific and adept at composing chansons, particularly late in his career when he lived in Paris.

Arcadelt was the most influential member of the early phase of madrigal composition, the "classic" phase; it was through Arcadelt's publications, more than those of any other composer, that the madrigal became known outside of Italy. Later composers considered Arcadelt's style to represent an ideal; later reprints of his first madrigal book were often used for teaching, with reprints appearing more than a century after its original publication.

== Life ==
Arcadelt was born in Namur in the Habsburg Netherlands on 10 August 1507. He moved to Italy as a young man, and was present in Florence by the late 1520s, thereby gaining an opportunity to meet or work with Philippe Verdelot, who wrote the earliest named madrigals. In 1538, or immediately before, he moved to Rome where he obtained an appointment with the papal choir at St. Peter's Basilica; many composers from the Netherlands served as singers there throughout this period, and it is even possible that he went to Rome before coming to Florence. Still in Rome, in January 1539, he was probably made a member of the Julian Chapel (the records give his name as "Jacobus flandrus", suggesting a Flemish origin, but it cannot be known with certainty if this record refers to Arcadelt). After some months there, he became a member of the Sistine Chapel, where he was appointed magister puerorum. The same year saw the publication of no fewer than four books of his madrigals. The first of these collections, Il primo libro di madrigali, went through 45 editions, becoming the most widely reprinted collection of madrigals of the time.

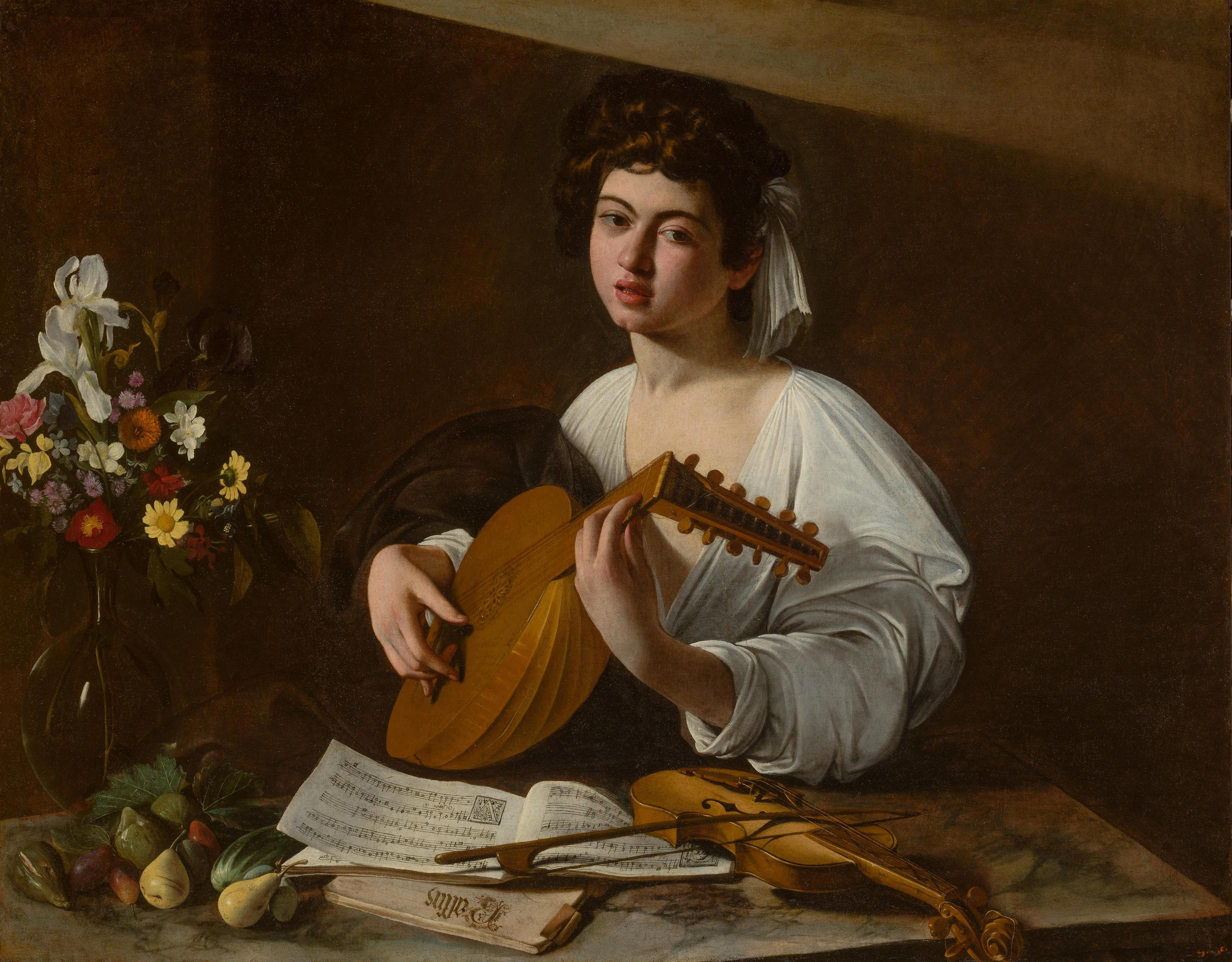
The Lute Player, by Caravaggio; the performer is reading music by Arcadelt.

Arcadelt remained in Rome as a singer and composer at the Sistine Chapel until 1551, except for one leave of absence to visit France in 1547. During this period, probably in early 1542, he made the acquaintance of Michelangelo, but his madrigalian settings of two of the artist's sonnets were received with indifference; indeed, from Michelangelo's letters on the topic, he probably considered himself unmusical and incapable of appreciating Arcadelt's work. Michelangelo paid Arcadelt with a piece of satin suitable for making into a doublet.

Arcadelt wrote over 200 madrigals before he left Italy in 1551 to return to France, where he spent the remainder of his life; his numerous chansons date from this and subsequent years. In 1557 he published a book of masses, dedicated to his new employer, Charles de Guise, Cardinal of Lorraine (Arcadelt was maître de chapelle, i.e. choirmaster for him). In this publication he was mentioned as a member of the royal chapel, and therefore must have served both Henry II (died 1559) and Charles IX during this late phase of his career. In Paris he employed the publishing house of Le Roy and Ballard, who printed his abundant chansons, masses and motets just as the Venetian printers had earlier printed his madrigals.

Arcadelt died in Paris on 14 October 1568.

François Rabelais immortalized Arcadelt in the introduction to Book IV of Gargantua and Pantagruel, where he includes the musician between Clément Janequin and Claudin de Sermisy as part of a choir singing a ribald song, in which Priapus boasts to the gods on Mount Olympus of his method of using a mallet to deflower a new bride.

== Music ==
During his long and productive career, Arcadelt wrote music both sacred and secular, all of it vocal. He left a total of 24 motets, 125 French chansons, approximately 250 madrigals (about fifty of which are of uncertain attribution), three masses, as well as settings of the Lamentations of Jeremiah and the Magnificat. There may be as many as 250 more madrigals by Arcadelt which survive anonymously in manuscript sources. Influences on his music ranged from the chanson and polyphonic style of his northern homeland, to the native secular music of Italy such as the frottola, to the music he heard while he served in the Sistine Chapel choir. Of all the early madrigalists, he was the most universal in his appeal; his influence on others was enormous. Arcadelt brought the madrigal form to its early maturity.

=== Secular music ===
==== Madrigals ====
Io dico che fra voi (Madrigal for four voices; setting of a poem by Michelangelo, from the early 1540s) Arcadelt's several hundred madrigals, composed over a span of at least two decades, were usually for four voices, although he wrote a few for three, and a handful for five and six voices. Stylistically his madrigals are melodious and simple in structure, singable, and built on a clear harmonic basis, usually completely diatonic. The music is often syllabic, and while it sometimes uses repeated phrases, is almost always through-composed (as opposed to the contemporary chanson, which was often strophic). Arcadelt alternates homophonic and polyphonic textures, "in a state of delicate, labile equilibrium". His madrigals best represent the "classic" phase of development of the form, with their clear outline, four-part writing, refinement, and balance; the word painting, chromaticism, ornamentation, virtuosity, expressionistic and manneristic writing of madrigalists later in the century are nowhere to be found in Arcadelt.

His music became immensely popular in Italy and France for more than a hundred years, with his first book of madrigals being reprinted fifty-eight times by 1654, and his music appearing in innumerable intabulations for instruments such as the lute, guitar, and viol. Additional hints to his popularity are the frequency with which anonymous compositions were attributed to him, and the appearance of his music in several paintings of musicians from the time. Likely his popularity was due to his gift for capturing the Italian spirit and marrying it with the technical perfection of the Franco-Flemish harmonic and polyphonic style; in addition he wrote catchy tunes which were easy to sing. Unlike later generations of madrigal composers, Arcadelt did not expect professional singers to be the only consumers of his work; anyone who could read notes could sing his madrigals.

For his texts, Arcadelt chose poets ranging from Petrarch (and his setting of a complete canzone, as a set of five interrelated madrigals, was the predecessor of the vogue for madrigal cycles), Pietro Bembo, Sannazaro, to Florentines Lorenzino de'Medici, Benedetto Varchi, Filippo Strozzi, and Michelangelo himself, to others such as Luigi Cassola of Piacenza, a now-obscure writer who was among the most often-set poets of the early madrigalists. Much of the poetry of Arcadelt's madrigals has remained anonymous, just as some of Arcadelt's music is believed to survive anonymously. Another poet he set was Giovanni Guidiccioni, who wrote the words to his most single famous composition, and one of the most enduring of the entire 16th century: the four-voice madrigal Il bianco e dolce cigno (The white and gentle swan).

This madrigal was appealing on many levels. According to Alfred Einstein, writing in The Italian Madrigal, "… he is content with a simple, tender declamation of the text, depending upon the elementary and magical power of music, of harmony, which veils this poem in a cloak of sublime and distant sentimentality. Here is attained the ideal of what the time expected of the dolcezza [sweetness] and the suavità [suaveness] of music. Arcadelt has conferred upon this composition a quality which is very rare in sixteenth-century secular music, namely durability …" The texture is mostly homophonic, with a hint of fauxbourdon in the harmony; the subject matter is erotic, with the orgasmic "thousand deaths" portrayed by a rising fourth figure in close imitation; brief bits of word-painting occur, such as the use of a flattened seventh on "piangendo"; and the musical phrases overlap the lines of verse, blurring the formal division of the line, a technique known in music, as in poetry, as enjambment.

==== Chansons ====
Since Arcadelt lived both in France and Italy, writing secular music in both countries, his chansons and madrigals not unexpectedly share some features. The chanson was by its nature a more stable form, often strophic and with patterned repetition; the madrigal, on the other hand, was usually through-composed. Arcadelt borrowed some features of the chanson when he wrote his madrigals, in the same way, he wrote some of his chansons with madrigalian features. Most of his chansons are syllabic and simple, with brief bursts of polyphonic writing, occasionally canonic, and with sections imitating the note nere style of the madrigal. Some of his chansons were actually contrafacta of his madrigals (the same music, printed with new words French instead of Italian). Rarely in music history were the madrigal and the chanson more alike.

=== Sacred music ===
In addition to his copious output of madrigals and chansons, Arcadelt produced three masses, 24 motets, settings of the Magnificat, the Lamentations of Jeremiah, and some sacred chansons – the French equivalent of the madrigale spirituale. The masses are influenced by the previous generation of Franco-Flemish composers, particularly Jean Mouton and Josquin des Prez; the motets, avoiding the dense polyphony favored by the Netherlanders, are more declamatory and clear in texture, in a manner similar to his secular music. Much of his religious music, except for the sacred chansons, he probably wrote during his years in the papal chapel in Rome. Documents from the Sistine Chapel archives indicate that the choir sang his music during his residence there. Arcadelt's Ave Maria is not an original sacred work by the composer. In 1842, Pierre-Louis Dietsch adjusted Arcadelt's chanson "Nous voyons que les hommes" to the Latin text and added a bass line.

=== Publishers ===
Antoine Gardano became the primary Italian publisher for Arcadelt, although the competing Venetian publishing house of Scotto brought out one of his madrigal books as well. Arcadelt's Il bianco e dolce cigno opened one of Gardano's books; as the piece had already achieved immense fame, it was the main selling point. In Paris, some of Arcadelt's chansons appeared as early as 1540 in the publications of Pierre Attaingnant and Jacques Moderne, so must have been written in Italy. After Arcadelt returned to France, his chansons, masses, and motets appeared in the editions of the printing firm of Le Roy and Ballard throughout the 1550s and 1560s, while his music was still being printed in distant Venice.

== Works ==
A complete modern edition of Arcadelt's works is published in CMM, xxxi, 1–10 (ten volumes), edited by Albert Seay. The first volume contains Arcadelt's masses; his secular compositions are in volumes two through nine, and his motets and other sacred music are in volume ten. Below is a partial list of his works. Note that numbering is by number of voices: for example, there is an Il primo libro di madrigali (First Book of Madrigals) for four voices, and another Primo libro di madrigali for three.

=== Madrigals ===
- Il primo libro di madrigali (four voices; Venice, 1539)
- Il secondo libro de madrigali (four voices; Venice, 1539, published by Scotto)
- Il vero secondo libro di madrigali (four voices; Venice, 1539)
- Terzo libro de i madrigali novissimi (four voices; Venice, 1539)
- Il quarto libro di madrigali (four voices; Venice, 1539)
- Primo libro di madrigali (three voices; Venice, 1542)
- Il quinto libro di madrigali (four voices; Venice, 1544)
- Numerous other madrigals in other collections, and in manuscript, 1537 to 1559

=== Chansons ===
- Quatorsiesme livre de chansons (four to six voices; Paris, 1561)
- Tiers livres de chansons (four voices; Paris, 1567)
- Quatrième livre de chansons (four voices; Paris, 1567)
- Cinquième livre de chansons (four voices; Paris, 1567)
- Sisième livre de chansons (four to five voices; Paris, 1569)
- Neuvième livre de chansons (four to six voices; Paris, 1569)

=== Masses ===
- Missa tres (four, five, and six voices; Paris, 1557)

=== Magnificats and lamentations ===
- Magnificat primi toni (four to six voices; Paris, 1557)
- Lamentationes Jeremiae i (four voices; Paris, 1557)
- Lamentationes Jeremiae ii (four voices; Paris, 1557)
- Lamentationes Jeremiae iii (four voices; Paris, 1557)

=== Motets and sacred chansons ===
- Numerous individual compositions published between 1532 and 1555; motets in Latin and sacred chansons in French

== References and further reading ==
- Abraham, Gerald. The Age of Humanism. London: Oxford University Press, 1968.
- Atlas, Allan W. Renaissance Music. New York: W. W. Norton & Company, Inc., 1998.
- Blume, Friedrich. Renaissance and Baroque Music. New York: W. W. Norton & Company, Inc., 1967.
- Brown, Howard Mayer. Music in the Renaissance. Prentice Hall History of Music Series. Englewood Cliffs, New Jersey; Prentice-Hall, Inc., 1976. ISBN 0-13-608497-4
- Brown, Howard Mayer, and Stein, Louise K. Music in the Renaissance, second edition. Upper Saddle River: Prentice Hall, 1999.
- Einstein, Alfred. The Italian Madrigal. Three volumes. Princeton, New Jersey, Princeton University Press, 1949. ISBN 0-691-09112-9
- Haar, James; Glozer, Letitia. "Arcadelt [Archadelt, Arcadet], Jacques", Grove Music Online (subscription required)
- Perkins, Leeman L. Music in the Age of the Renaissance. New York: W. W. Norton & Company, Inc., 1999.
- François Rabelais, Gargantua and Pantagruel (tr. J.M. Cohen). Baltimore, Penguin Books, 1963.
- Randel, Don, ed. The New Harvard Dictionary of Music. Cambridge, Massachusetts, Harvard University Press, 1986. ISBN 0-674-61525-5
- Gustave Reese, Music in the Renaissance. New York, W.W. Norton & Co., 1954/1959. ISBN 0-393-09530-4
- Slonimsky, Nicolas. The Concise Edition of Baker's Biographical Dictionary of Musicians, 8th ed. New York, Schirmer Books, 1993. ISBN 0-02-872416-X
