= Philippe Verdelot =

French composer

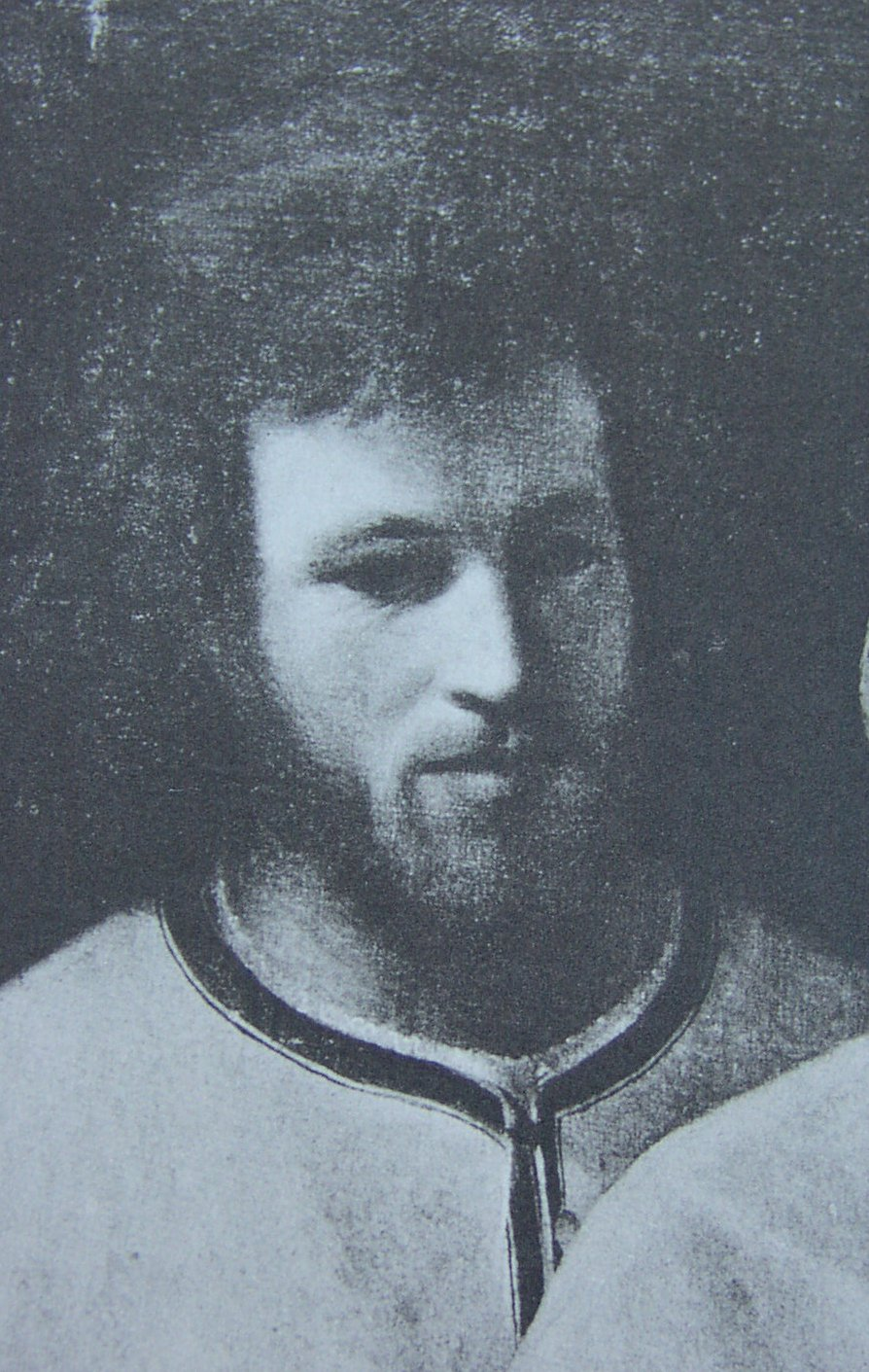
Phillipe Verdelot, as painted by Lorenzo Luzzo (known as Morto da Feltre).

Philippe Verdelot (French: [filip vɛʁdəlo]; 1480 to 1485 – 1530 to 1540) was a French composer of the Renaissance, who spent most of his life in Italy. He is commonly considered to be the father of the Italian madrigal, and certainly was one of its earliest and most prolific composers; in addition he was prominent in the musical life of Florence during the period after the recapture of the city by the Medici from the followers of Girolamo Savonarola.

== Life ==
Verdelot was born in Les Loges, Seine-et-Marne, France. Details of his early life are obscure. He probably came to Italy at an early age, spending the first decade or two of the 16th century at some cities in northern Italy, most likely including Venice. A painting of 1511, described by Vasari but never positively identified, is believed by many musicologists to show Verdelot in Venice with an Italian singer.

Verdelot is known to have been maestro di cappella at the Baptisterium San Giovanni in Florence from 1523 to 1525; and he seems also to have been employed at the Cathedral there, from 1523 until 1527. In 1526 he collaborated with Niccolò Machiavelli on a production of Machiavelli's famous cynical comedy La Mandragola. While the play was written in 1518, the 1526 performance in Florence was dedicated to the Medici pope, Clement VII. Both Machiavelli, expelled from Florence by the Medici, and Verdelot, generally sided with the Florentine Republic against the Medici, but attempted to play the delicate political game of pleasing both sides. The several pieces which Verdelot wrote for Machiavelli's play, while called canzone, are considered to be the earliest madrigals.

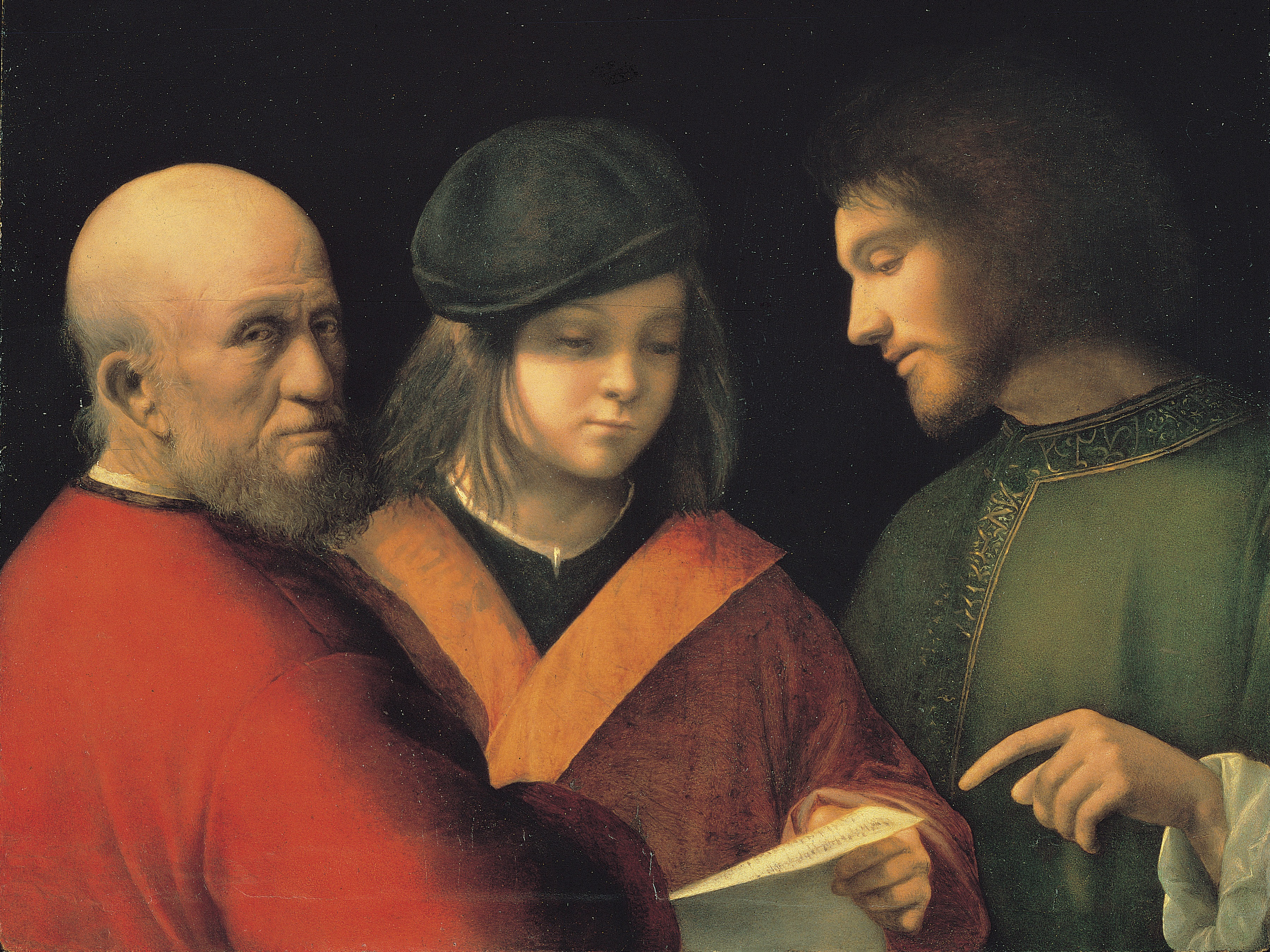
The Three Ages attributed to Giorgione, possibly depicting Philippe Verdelot (Pitti). Vasari describes a painting by Sebastiano del Piombo depicting Verdelot with a singer Ubretto: this has been tentatively identified with an unsigned work destroyed in World War II.

In addition to siding with the Florentine Republic, Verdelot was most likely a supporter of martyred reformer Girolamo Savonarola. This is shown by several of his works: his setting of In te domine speravi, based on the psalm which was the subject of that man's last writing before he was burned at the stake; and the use of the tune most closely associated with the monk, Ecce quam bonum, the song which unified his followers during his final conflict, and which appears in the inner voices in Verdelot's motet Letamini in domino.

Verdelot may have been killed in the siege of Florence (1529–1530) or in the simultaneous plague that ravaged the city, since there is no definite evidence that he was alive after 1530. That he was there during the siege has been considered likely on the evidence of one of his motets, composed around that time, Congregati sunt inimici nostri. In this work, texts from Ecclesiasticus are woven together with the Antiphon for Peace, "Da pacem Domine", which is used as a cantus firmus.

Some scholars infer that Verdelot was alive until about 1540, based on some ambiguous references to contemporary events in his works published during the 1530s. Several books of madrigals published in Venice in the late 1530s include his work; one of these books is devoted entirely to him. Possibly he moved to Venice after the siege to escape the notoriously vengeful, and victorious, Medici. He is known to have been dead by 1552, when writer Ortenzo Landi mentioned him as being deceased.

== Music and influence ==
Verdelot, along with Costanzo Festa, is considered to be the father of the madrigal, an a cappella vocal form which emerged in the late 1520s from a convergence of several previous musical streams (including the frottola, the canzone, the laude, and also including some influence from the more serious style of the motet).

Verdelot's style balances homophonic with imitative textures, rarely using word-painting, which was largely a later development (though a few interesting foreshadowings can be found). Most of his madrigals are for five or six voices.

Verdelot's madrigals were hugely popular, as can be inferred from their frequency of reprinting and their wide dissemination throughout Europe in the 16th century. He also composed motets and masses.

== Works ==
Verdelot's complete works were published by The American Institute of Musicology (edited by Anne-Marie Bragard).

=== Madrigals ===
- Benché ’l misero cor
- Con lagrime e sospir
- Divini occhi sereni
- Donna leggiadra et bella
- I vostr'acuti dardi
- Italia mia bench'il parlar
- Madonna il tuo bel viso
- Madonna per voi ardo
- Per altri monti
- Perche piu acerba
- Seule demeure et despourveue

=== Motets ===
- Beata es Virgo Maria
- Congregati sunt inimici nostri
- Si bona suscepimus

=== Masses ===
- Missa Philomna
- Missa La Gloria del Dixit Dominus

=== Hymns ===
- Hymno della Natività di Christo
- Hymno della Resurrectione di Christo
- Hymno dell'archangelo Rafaelo
- Hymno dei confessori
- Hymno del corpo di Christo
- Hymno di San Niccolo
- Hymno della Epiphania
- Hymno della Ascensione
- Hymno della Virgine

=== Magnificat ===
- Magnificat sexti toni
