= Costanzo Festa =

Italian composer

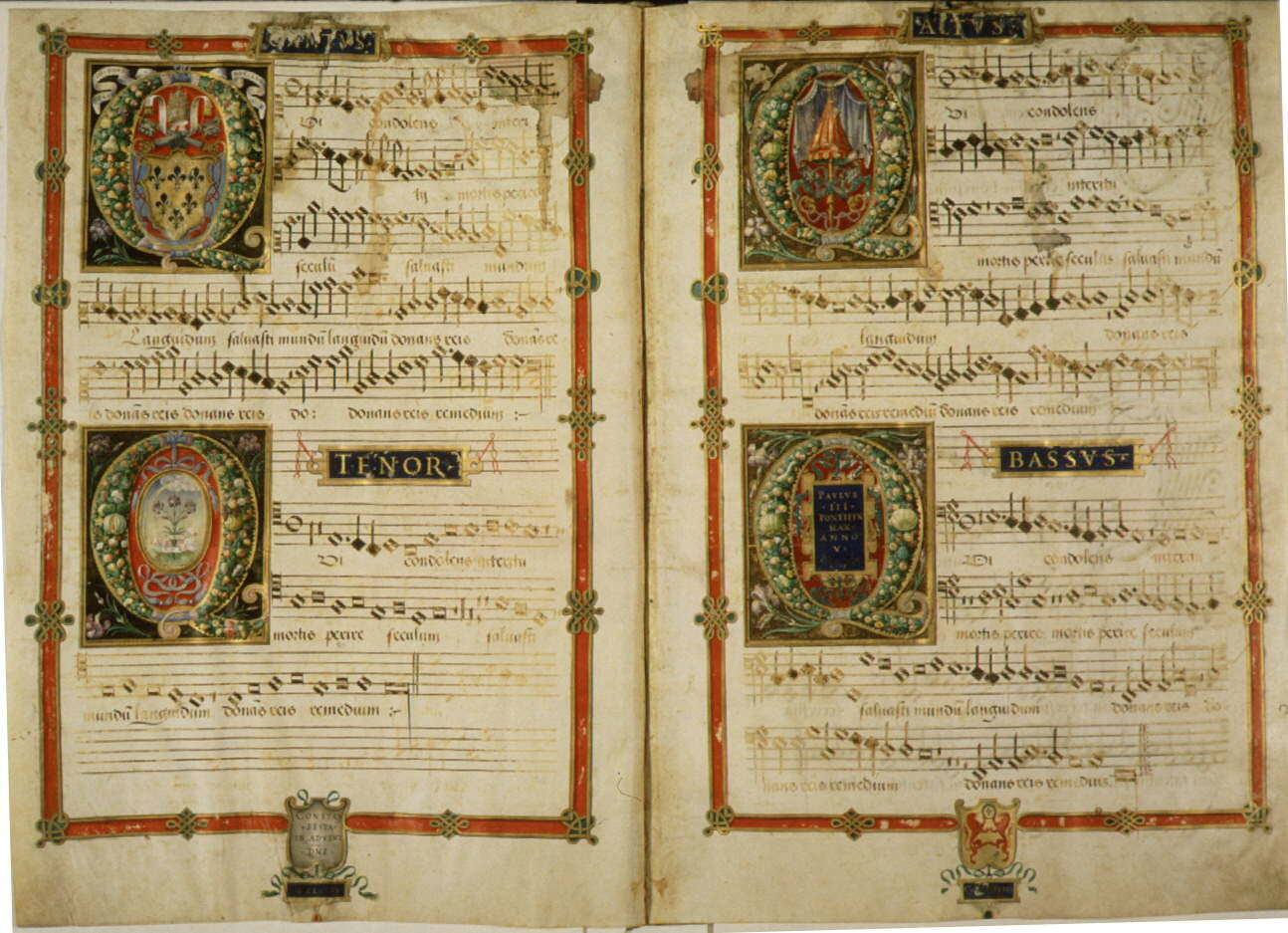
A collection of polyphonic hymns and Magnificats by Costanzo Festa; this is the earliest surviving such collection by a single composer in the Vatican archive

Costanzo Festa (c. 1485/1490 – 10 April 1545) was an Italian composer of the Renaissance. While he is best known for his madrigals, he also wrote sacred vocal music. He was the first native Italian polyphonist of international renown, and with Philippe Verdelot, one of the first to write madrigals, in the infancy of that most popular of all sixteenth-century Italian musical forms.

== Life ==
Not much is known about his early life. He was probably born in the Piedmont near Turin, but the evidence is not certain, being based mainly on later documents referring to him as a clericis secularibus, i.e. not a monk, from that region. His birth date has been given as early as 1480 and as late as 1495, but recent scholarship has tended to narrow the range to the late 1480s. In addition he may have been related to his slightly younger contemporary Sebastiano Festa, another early madrigal composer, also from the same region. Sebastiano's father, Jacobinus, was a resident in Turin around 1520.

In early 1514, Festa wrote a motet, Quis dabit oculis, on the occasion of the death of the Queen of France (Anne of Brittany) (9 January 1514). Anne's funeral was an extensive affair, lasting 40 days; Johannes Prioris also composed music for it. This motet is the earliest datable composition of Festa's, and the first record of his activity.

In 1514, Festa visited Ferrara, bringing some motets with him; he seems to have been an established composer by this time, as indicated by the reception he received. This motet appears in a manuscript copied between 1516 and 1519, which also contains music by Sebastiano Festa, his possible relative; since the manuscript is thought to have been copied in northeast Italy, one or more of the motets it contains, may have been those he brought to Ferrara. Most likely after his visit to Ferrara, but certainly between 1510 and 1517, he lived on Ischia, an island in the bay of Naples, where he served as a music teacher to the aristocratic d'Avalos family. In 1517, he moved to Rome and began employment with Pope Leo X as a singer, and his association with the Sistine Chapel choir was to continue uninterrupted for almost 30 years. In September 1536, he wrote to Filippo Strozzi, his patron, to help him find a Venetian printer willing to print a book of his liturgical music similar to the ones being printed in Rome by Andrea Antico; he wanted the sum of 200 scudi for the job, but was unsuccessful. During this era, printers more often demanded money from composers for the privilege of publication than the other way around.

Festa was active as a composer throughout the period, and some of the earliest madrigals identifiable as such, by any composer, may come from his pen and date from the mid 1520s; only some compositions by Bernardo Pisano, Sebastiano Festa, and possibly Philippe Verdelot may predate them by a few years. While he was unsuccessful in his attempted sale to the Venetian printer in 1536, a Roman firm produced a book of madrigals in 1538, as a result of the privilege granted, but most of it has been lost. In 1537, a Venetian firm printed a collection of his madrigals for three voices.

An unusual number of Festa's works can be dated precisely, since some of the compositions are topical, referring to weddings, visits, deaths, and other events (some composers of the Renaissance, such as Josquin des Prez, wrote an immense amount of music, almost none of which can be dated precisely). Among the dateable compositions is the motet for Anne of Brittany; compositions copied in a manuscript between 1515 and 1519; a motet protesting the 1527 sack of Rome; some madrigals Festa sent to Strozzi in 1528 (they were named "canti"); a lost 1533 madrigal to a poem by Michelangelo; music for a 1539 Medici wedding; and other compositions in hand-written manuscripts which have been dated.

A communication from 1543 indicates that Festa was too sick to travel with the Pope to Bologna, and he died in Rome in 1545.

== Music and influence ==
Festa was one of the few Italians in the Papal Choir, which at that time was dominated by musicians from northern Europe. He was a master of the Netherlands contrapuntal technique, however, and his importance to music history is as the one who first brought the two musical styles, the Italian and the Netherlandish, together. In addition, he was an obvious influence on Palestrina, who modeled many of his early works after his.

Most of Festa's madrigals are for three voices, in contrast to the other early madrigalists: for example Verdelot preferred five or six voices, while Sebastiano Festa only wrote for four. He liked quick, rhythmically active passages in his madrigals; this may reflect an influence from the contemporary vocal form of the villanesca. In addition, he wrote extended homophonic sections, showing somewhat less influence from the contemporary motet, in contrast to the motet-like imitative passages found in Verdelot.

In addition to his madrigals, published mostly between 1543 and 1549, several collections of his sacred works were published during his lifetime, among them four masses, over forty motets, a set of Lamentations, and numerous Magnificats and Marian Litanies (for two choruses, each with four voices). The style of his sacred music matches that of his secular: he was less fond of imitation and complex counterpoint for its own sake, and often wrote purely homophonic passages. Since Rome was musically conservative compared to the rest of Italy (and Europe) at the time, and there was a strong reaction against elaborate counterpoint within two decades after his death (expressly stated by the Council of Trent), his stylistic bent may represent a foreshadowing of that event; perhaps he was responding to the taste and needs of his papal employer.

=== La Spagna ===
Festa also wrote instrumental music. His most famous instrumental output is the monumental scholastic counterpoint study on La Spagna on which he wrote 125 variations using it as cantus firmus. La Spagna comes from a presumably Spanish "Basse danse" (bassadanza) well known by several famous composers of his time: Josquin himself wrote a variation on La Spagna. This work is also called I bassi and is a compendium of ways to combine the cantus firmus with added counterpoint or 'basses', suitable for any instruments. For a long time, musicologists believed that these variations were by Nanino, who one or even two generations after Festa, published his 28 motets on La spagna together with the 125 variations of Festa without mentioning the name Festa. Later commentators were led to assume that all of these 157 pieces were written by Nanino and this confused the whole research after the legendary study. Recent research leaves no doubt that the first 125 counterpoints are by Festa himself. What Festa does with the cantus firmus, a simple melody containing 37 notes, is not only extravagant and amazingly creative. He shows practically all possibilities of counterpoint technique of his time, using canons (even triple canon), imitations, free or strict counterpoint, all styles of instrumental and vocal composition technique like using soggetti cavati, plainchant paraphrases, retrograde counterpoint, ostinatos, quodlibets, using 2, 3, 4, 5, 6, 7, 8, and at the end 11 voices. He experimented with different rhythmical patterns (mensural problems) such as using two different tempo signatures (proportions), keys or rhythmically extremely complex bars with 7:5:3 proportions or other admirable ideas such as using the cantus firmus in a canon or putting the cantus firmus in every possible location in the texture. The studies on La Spagna showed that he also used musica ficta and a lot of Christian and ancient symbolics (numerology) as well as hidden or obvious symmetrical structures in his counterpoints.

The 125 counterpoints on La Spagna certainly belong to the most interesting works of Festa and probably even of his time and could be seen as a lifetime work. Even when it was considered as a pure 'scholastic work' with somehow too much use of strict technique and "construction", sometimes rather archaic and with pure mathematical logic, it remains remarkable that he wrote it as a compendium for learning how to sing and compose and to learn about all the secrets of counterpoint mastery. It must be seen as one of Festa's best and outstanding works. A monumental study by a Renaissance genius, its first successor two centuries later was Fux's Gradus ad parnassum and in complexity it rather should be compared even with J.S. Bach's speculative late work.

An indication of Festa's fame is his appearance in the introduction to Book Four of Gargantua and Pantagruel by François Rabelais. In the song Festa and others sing, Priapus boasts to the gods on Mount Olympus of his method of deflowering a new bride with a wooden mallet. Festa is the only Italian among the large group of singers listed by Rabelais, which appear to be a collection of the most famous musicians of the age.

== Media ==
Afflitti Spirti Miei

Ogni Belta Madonna

Si Come Sete Bella

Una Donna

Venite amanti insieme
This last piece is a contrafactum by Loyset Compère on a composition by Costanzo Festa. All five of the above performances were by the MIT Chamber Chorus under direction of William Cutter.
