= List of Baroque composers =

Composers of the Baroque era, ordered by date of birth:

== Transition from Renaissance to Baroque (born 1500–1549) ==
Composers in the Renaissance/Baroque transitional era include the list below (listed by their date of birth):

- Philippe de Monte (1521–1603)
- Baldassare Donato (1525/1530–1603)
- Costanzo Porta (1529–1601)
- Jiří Rychnovský (1529–1616)
- Guillaume Costeley (1530–1606)
- Fabritio Caroso (1530–1605/1620)
- Mateo Flecha the Younger (1530–1604)
- Gianmatteo Asola (1532–1609)
- Claudio Merulo (1533–1604)
- Francesco Soto de Langa (1534–1619)
- Rocco Rodio (1535–after 1615)
- Mikołaj Gomółka (1535–1609)
- Cesare Negri (1535–1605)
- Simone de Bonefont (1535 – ?)
- Johannes Matelart (before 1538–1607)
- Stefano Felis (1538–1603)
- William Byrd (1540–1623)
- Matthäus Waissel (1540–1602)
- Giovanni Ferretti (1540–after 1609)
- Tiburzio Massaino (1540–after 1608)
- Hernando de Cabezón (1541–1602)
- Gioseffo Guami (1542–1611)
- Giovanni Maria Nanino (1543/1544–1607)
- Francesco Guami (1544–1602)
- Anthony Holborne (1545–1602)
- Luzzasco Luzzaschi (1545–1607)
- Jakub Polak (1545–1605)
- Ginés de Boluda (1545–1606)
- Manuel Mendes (1547–1605)
- Francesco Soriano (1548–1621)
- Tomás Luis de Victoria (1548–1611)
- Eustache Du Caurroy (1549–1609)
- Bernardo Clavijo del Castillo (1549–1626)

== Early Baroque era composers (born 1550–1599) ==
Composers of the Early Baroque era include the following figures listed by the probable or proven date of their birth:

- Charles Tessier (1550–after 1604)
- Thomas Mancinus (1550–1612)
- Ippolito Baccusi (1550–1609)
- Emilio de' Cavalieri (c. 1550–1602)
- Cesario Gussago (1550–1612)
- Pomponio Nenna (1550–1613)
- Riccardo Rognoni (c. 1550–c. 1620)
- David Sacerdote (1550–1625)
- Ruggiero Trofeo (1550–1614)
- Orazio Vecchi (1550–1605)
- Guillaume de Chastillon, sieur de La Tour (c. 1550–1610)
- Tomasz Szadek (1550–1612)
- Krzysztof Klabon (1550–1616)
- Gregory (Gregorius) Howet (Huwet) (1550–1617)
- Pedro de Cristo (1550–1618)
- Vicente Espinel (1550–1624)
- Juan Navarro (1550–1610)
- Ambrosio Cotes (1550–1603)
- Sebastián Raval (1550–1604)
- Jan Trojan Turnovský (1550–1606)
- Pavel Spongopaeus Jistebnický (1550–1619)
- Giulio Caccini (1551–1618)
- Benedetto Pallavicino (1551–1601)
- Girolamo Belli (1552–1620)
- Edmund Hooper (1553–1621)
- Johannes Eccard (1553–1611)
- Leonhard Lechner (1553–1606)
- Elway Bevin (1554–1638)
- William Inglot (1554–1621)
- Emmanuel Adriaenssen (1554–1604)
- Cosimo Bottegari (1554–1620)
- Girolamo Diruta (1554-after 1610)
- Giovanni Giacomo Gastoldi (1554–1609)
- Giovanni Gabrieli (c. 1554/1557–1612)
- Jacques Champion, Sieur de la Chapelle (before 1555–1642)
- John Mundy (1555–1630)
- Gabriele Villani (1555–1625)
- Manuel Rodrigues Coelho (c. 1555–c. 1635)
- Paolo Quagliati (c. 1555–1628)
- Alonso Lobo (1555–1617)
- Johannes Nucius (c. 1556–1620)
- Thomas Morley (1557–1602)
- Carolus Luython (1557–1620)
- Jacques Mauduit (1557–1627)
- Giovanni Croce (c. 1557–1609)
- Alfonso Fontanelli (1557–1622)
- Wojciech Długoraj (1557–after 1619)
- Nathaniel Giles (1558–1634)
- Matthew Jeffries (1558–1615)
- Ferdinando Richardson (1558–1618)
- Richard Carlton (1558–1638)
- Philippus Schoendorff (1558–1617)
- Giovanni Bassano (c. 1558–1617)
- Scipione Stella (1558/1559–1622)
- Richard Allison (1560/1570–before 1610)
- Felice Anerio (1560–1614)
- Giulio Belli (c. 1560–1621 or later)
- William Brade (1560–1630)
- Abraham Blondet (1560–1634)
- William Cobbold (1560–1639)
- Nicolas Gistou (1560–1609)
- James Harding (1560–1626)
- Diomedes Cato (c. 1560/1565–1618)
- Camillo Lambardi (c. 1560–1634)
- Giovanni Bernardino Nanino (c. 1560–1623)
- Peter Philips (c. 1560–1628)
- Hieronymus Praetorius (1560–1629)
- August Nörmiger (1560–1613)
- Thomas Robinson (1560–1610)
- Lodovico Grossi da Viadana (c. 1560–1627)
- Scipione Dentice (1560–1635)
- Carlo Gesualdo (1560–1613)
- Ruggiero Giovannelli (c. 1560–1625)
- Antonio II Verso (1560–1621)
- Leone Leoni (1560–1627)
- Petrus de Drusina (1560–1611)
- Juan Esquivel Barahona (1560–after 1625)
- Elias Mertel (1561–1626)
- Sebastian Aguilera de Heredia (1561–1627)
- Jacopo Peri (1561–1633)
- Francesco Usper, or Francesco Sponga (1561–1641)
- John Bull (1562–1628)
- Jan Pieterszoon Sweelinck (1562–1621)
- Andreas Raselius (1562–1602)
- Jean Titelouze (1562/1563–1633)
- John Dowland (1563–1626)
- Giles Farnaby (c. 1563–1640)
- John Milton (1563–1647)
- Cornelis Verdonck (1563–1625)
- John Danyel (1564–1626)
- Hans Leo Hassler (1564–1612)
- Kryštof Harant z Polžic a Bezdružic (1564–1621)
- Giulio Cesare Martinengo (1564/1568–1613)
- Giovanni Giacomo de Antiquis (fl. 1565 – c. 1608)
- John Hilton (1565–1609?)
- Michael Cavendish (1565–1628)
- John Farmer (1565–1605)
- George Kirbye (1565–1634)
- William Leighton (1565–1622)
- Leonard Woodson (1565–1641)
- Gregor Aichinger (c. 1565–1628)
- Duarte Lobo (c. 1565–1646)
- Erasmo Marotta (1565–1641)
- Ascanio Mayone (c. 1565–1627)
- Giovanni Pietro Flaccomio (1565–1617)
- Simone Molinaro (1565–1615)
- Francis Pilkington (c. 1565–1638)
- Manuel Cardoso (1566–1650)
- Gaspar Fernandes, or Fernández (1566–1629)
- Alessandro Piccinini (1566–1638)
- Lucia Quinciani (born c. 1566; fl. 1611)
- Thomas Campion (1567–1620)
- Christoph Demantius (1567–1643)
- Jean-Baptiste Besard (1567–1625)
- Nicolas Formé (1567–1638)
- Girolamo Giacobbi (1567–1629)
- Joachim van den Hove (c. 1567–1620)
- René Mesangeau (fl. 1567–1638)
- Lorenzo Allegri (1567–1648)
- Claudio Monteverdi (1567–1643)
- Bartolomeo Barbarino (c. 1568–1617 or later)
- Philip Rosseter (1568–1623)
- Adriano Banchieri (1568–1634)
- Christian Erbach (c. 1568–1635)
- Joan Baptista Comes (1568–1643)
- Edward Gibbons (1568–1650)
- Richard Gibbs (1568–1650)
- Giovanni Francesco Anerio (1569–1630)
- Tobias Hume (1569–1645)
- Ottavio Vernizzi (1569–1649)
- Orazio Bassani, "Orazio della Viola" (before 1570–1615)
- Thomas Bateson (1570–1630)
- Benjamin Cosyn (1570–1652 or later)
- Giovanni Paolo Cima (c. 1570–1622)
- Peeter Cornet (c. 1570/1580–1633)
- Pierre Guédron (c. 1570–c. 1620)
- Paul Peuerl (1570–1625)
- Joan Pau Pujol (1570–1626)
- Salamone Rossi (c. 1570–1630)
- Girolamo Bartei (c. 1570–c. 1618)
- Claudia Sessa (c. 1570–c. 1617/1619)
- Giovanni Battista Fontana (c. 1571–c. 1630)
- Thomas Lupo (1571–1627)
- Filipe de Magalhães (c. 1571–1652)
- Giovanni Picchi (1571–1643)
- Michael Praetorius (c. 1571–1621)
- John Ward (1571–1638)
- Edward Johnson (1572–1601)
- Daniel Bacheler (1572–1619)
- Melchior Borchgrevinck (1572–1632)
- Martin Peerson (1572–1651)
- Thomas Tomkins (1572–1656)
- Moritz von Hessen-Kassel (1572–1632)
- Erasmus Widmann (1572–1634)
- Salvatore Sacco (1572–1622)
- Ellis Gibbons (1573–1603)
- Géry de Ghersem (1573/1575–1630)
- Cesarina Ricci de Tingoli (born c. 1573, fl. 1597)
- Claudio Pari (1574–after 1619)
- Francesco Rasi (1574–1621)
- Gabriel Bataille (1574–1630)
- John Wilbye (1574–1638)
- Andreas Hakenberger (1574–1627)
- John Bennet (1575–after 1614)
- Vittoria Aleotti (c. 1575–after 1620)
- Abundio Antonelli (c. 1575?–c. 1629)
- Robert Ballard (c. 1575–1645)
- Estêvão de Brito (1575–1641)
- John Coprario, or John Cooper (c. 1575–1626)
- Ignazio Donati (c. 1575–1638)
- Daniel Farrant (c. 1575–1651)
- Alfonso Ferrabosco the younger (c. 1575–1628)
- Michelagnolo Galilei (1575–1631)
- Ennemond Gaultier, le Vieux Gaultier (1575–1651)
- Johann Groh (c. 1575–1627?)
- Léonard de Hodémont (c. 1575–1639)
- Esteban López Morago, or Estêvão Lopes Morago (c. 1575–after 1630)
- Giovanni Priuli (c. 1575–1626)
- Mateo Romero, or Mathieu Rosmarin (c. 1575–1647)
- William Simmes (c. 1575–c. 1625)
- Giovanni Maria Trabaci (c. 1575–1647)
- Thomas Weelkes (1576–1623)
- John Maynard (1577–between 1614 and 1633)
- Robert Jones (1577–1617)
- Stefano Bernardi (c. 1577–1637)
- Antonio Brunelli (1577–1630)
- Sulpitia Cesis (b. 1577; fl. 1619)
- Agostino Agazzari (1578–1640)
- John Amner (1579–1641)
- Melchior Franck (c. 1579–1639)
- Adriana Basile (c. 1580–c. 1640)
- Domenico Brunetti (c. 1580–1646)
- Andrea Cima, or Giovanni Andrea Cima (c. 1580–after 1627)
- Jacques Cordier (c. 1580–before 1655)
- Richard Dering (c. 1580–1630)
- Michael East (1580–1648)
- Thomas Ford (c. 1580–1648)
- Johannes Hieronymus Kapsberger, or Giovanni Girolamo Kapsperger (c. 1580–1651)
- John Lugg (1580–1647/1655)
- Hans Nielsen (1580–1626)
- François Richard (1580–1650)
- Johann Stobäus (1580–1646)
- Vincenzo Ugolini (c. 1580–1638)
- Bellerofonte Castaldi (c. 1581–1649)
- Johannes Jeep (1581/1582–1644)
- Johann Staden (1581–1634)
- Gregorio Allegri (1582–1652)
- Severo Bonini (1582–1663)
- Marco da Gagliano (1582–1643)
- Sigismondo d'India (c. 1582–1629)
- Thomas Ravenscroft (c. 1582–c. 1635)
- Thomas Simpson (1582–1628)
- Giovanni Valentini (c. 1582–1649)
- Paolo Agostino, or Agostini (c. 1583–1629)
- Girolamo Frescobaldi (1583–1643)
- Orlando Gibbons (1583–1625)
- Robert Johnson (c. 1583–1634)
- Johann Daniel Mylius (1583–1642)
- Mogens Pedersøn (c. 1583–1623)
- Nicolas Vallet (c. 1583–c. 1642)
- Michael Altenburg (1584–1640)
- Antonio Cifra (1584–1629)
- Francisco Correa de Arauxo (1584–1654)
- Daniel Friderici (1584–1638)
- Walter Rowe (c. 1584–1671)
- Giovanni Battista Rossi (fl. 1585 – c. 1628)
- Domenico Allegri (1585–1629)
- Antoine Boësset, Sieur de Villedieu (1586–1643)
- Jean de Bournonville (1585–1632)
- Louis Constantin (c. 1585–1657)
- Nicolò Corradini (c. 1585–1646)
- Andrea Falconieri (1585–1656)
- Johann Grabbe (1585–1655)
- Peter Hasse (c. 1585–1640)
- Francesco Rognoni (1585–after 1626)
- Heinrich Schütz (1585–1672)
- Nicolas Signac (1585–1645)
- Alessandro Grandi (1586–1630)
- Lucio Barbieri (1586–1659)
- Stefano Landi (1586–1639)
- Jacob Praetorius (1586–1651)
- Claudio Saracini (1586–1630)
- Johann Hermann Schein (1586–1630)
- Paul Siefert (1586–1666)
- John Adson (c. 1587–1640)
- Francesca Caccini (1587–c. 1640)
- Ivan Lukačić (c. 1587–1648)
- Samuel Scheidt (1587–1654)
- Guillaume Bouzignac (1587–1643)
- Charles d'Ambleville (1588–1637)
- Walter Porter (1588–1659)
- Francesco Colombini (1588–1671)
- Johann Andreas Herbst (1588–1666)
- Nicholas Lanier (1588–1666)
- Marin Mersenne (1588–1648)
- John Tomkins (1589–1638)
- Guilielmus Messaus (1589–1640)
- Francesco Turini (1589–1656)
- Caterina Assandra (c. 1590–after 1618)
- Artus Aux-Cousteaux (c. 1590–1656)
- Giovanni Pietro Berti (c. 1590?–1638)
- Hans Brachrogge (c. 1590-c. 1638)
- Dario Castello (c. 1590–c. 1658)
- Giovanni Martino Cesare (c. 1590–1667)
- Andreas Chyliński, or Andrzej Chyliński (c. 1590–after 1635)
- Jacob van Eyck (c. 1590–1657)
- Juan Gutiérrez de Padilla (c. 1590–1664)
- Adam Jarzębski (c. 1590–c. 1648)
- Manuel Machado (c. 1590–1646)
- Carlo Milanuzzi (c. 1590–c. 1647)
- Johann Schop (c. 1590–1667)
- Johannes Thesselius (c. 1590?–1643)
- Lucrezia Orsina Vizzana (1590–1662)
- Robert Ramsey (1590s–1644)
- Richard Mico (1590–1661)
- Giovanni Pietro Gallo (fl. 1591 – c. 1600)
- Nicolò Borbone, or Borboni (c. 1591–1641)
- Settimia Caccini (1591–1638?)
- Robert Dowland (c. 1591–1641)
- Isaac Posch (1591?–c. 1623)
- Cornelis Padbrué (c. 1592–1670)
- Jacques Gaultier (1592–1652)
- Paul Auget (1592–1660)
- John Jenkins (1592–1678)
- Domenico Mazzocchi (1592–1665)
- Melchior Schildt (1592/1593–1667)
- Truid Aagesen (1593–1625)
- Claudia Rusca (1593–1676)
- Gottfried Scheidt (1593–1661)
- Johann Ulrich Steigleder (1593–1635)
- Nicolas Le Vasseur (1593–1658)
- Matthäus Apelles von Löwenstern (1594–1648)
- Francesco Manelli (1594–1667)
- Biagio Marini (1594–1663)
- Orazio Michi, "Orazio dell'Arpa" (c. 1594–1641)
- Tarquinio Merula (1594/1595–1665)
- Antonio Maria Abbatini (c. 1595–1680)
- Giovanni Battista Buonamente (c. 1595–1642)
- Henry Lawes (1595–1662)
- John Okeover, or Oker (c. 1595–1663)
- Bartolomé de Selma y Salaverde (c. 1595–after 1638)
- Heinrich Scheidemann (c. 1595–1663)
- John Wilson (1595–1674)
- Constantijn Huygens (1596–1687)
- Giovanni Rovetta (c. 1596–1668)
- Andreas Düben (1597–1662)
- Virgilio Mazzocchi (1597–1646)
- Charles Racquet (1597–1664)
- Luigi Rossi (c. 1597–1653)
- Giuseppe Galli (fl. 1598)
- Johann Crüger (1598–1662)
- Giovanni Battista Fasolo (c. 1598–c. 1664)
- Pierre Gaultier d'Orleans (1599–1681)
- John Hilton the younger (c. 1599–1657)
- Étienne Moulinié (1599–1676)
- Thomas Selle (1599–1663)
- John Marchant (died 1611)
- Richard Martin (fl. c. 1610)
- Girolamo Dalla Casa (fl. from 1568; d. 1601)
- William Tisdale (born 1570)
- Henry Lichfild (died 1613)
- John Bartlet (fl. 1606–1610)
- Thomas Greaves (fl. 1604)
- Richard Sumarte (d. after 1630)
- Richard Nicholson (died 1639)
- Jean Boyer (15??–1648)
- Thomas Vautor (1580/1590–?)
- Henry Youll (1580/1590–?)
- George Handford (fl. c. 1609)
- Robert Tailour (fl. 1615)
- Charles Coleman (died 1664)
- William Corkine (fl. 1610–1617)
- Juan Arañés (fl. 1624–49; d. c. 1649)
- Giovanni Battista Grillo (died 1622)
- Marcantonio Negri (died 1624)
- Giovanni Battista Riccio (fl. 1609–1621)
- Giuseppe Scarani (fl. 1628–fl. 1642)
- Adam z Wągrowca (died 1629)
- Mikołaj Zieleński (fl. 1611)

== Middle Baroque era composers (born 1600–1649) ==
Composers of the Middle Baroque era include the following figures listed by the date of their birth:

- Mlle Bocquet (early 17th century–after 1660)
- Alessandro Poglietti (early 17th century–1683)
- François de La Roche (?–1677)
- François de Chancy (?–1656)
- Henry Frémart (16..–1651)
- Jean Veillot (16..–1662)
- Pierre Méliton (16? – 1684)
- Antonio de Jesús (????–1682)
- Demachy ou le Sieur De Machy (16? – 1692)
- Manuel Correia (c. 1600–1653)
- Giuseppe Giamberti (c.1600 – c. 1663)
- Bonaventura Rubino (c. 1600–1668)
- Girolamo Fantini (c. 1600–1675)
- Simon Ives (1600–1662)
- Nicolaus à Kempis (c. 1600–1676)
- Adam Václav Michna z Otradovic (c. 1600–1676)
- Marcin Mielczewski (c. 1600–1651)
- Carlos Patiño (1600–1675)
- Martino Pesenti (c. 1600–c. 1648)
- Giovanni Felice Sances (c. 1600–1679)
- Marco Scacchi (c. 1600–1662)
- Delphin Strungk (1600/1601–1694)
- Louis XIII (1601–1643)
- Michelangelo Rossi (c. 1601–1656)
- Jean-Baptiste Geoffroy (1601–1675)
- Jacques Champion de Chambonnières (1601/1602–1672)
- Francesco Cavalli (1602–1676)
- Chiara Margarita Cozzolani (1602–c. 1678)
- William Lawes (1602–1645)
- Marco Marazzoli (c. 1602–1662)
- Christopher Simpson (c. 1602/1606–1669)
- Orazio Tarditi (1602–1677)
- Benedetto Ferrari (c. 1603?–1681)
- Francesco Foggia (1603–1688)
- Denis Gaultier, Gaultier le jeune (1603–1672)
- John IV of Portugal (1603–1656)
- Caspar Kittel (1603–1639)
- Natale Monferrato (c. 1603–1685)
- Diego Pontac (1603–1654)
- Giuseppe Allevi (1603 or 1604-1670)
- Marco Uccellini (1603/1610–1680)
- Giovanni Battista Leonetti (fl. 1604 – c. 1617)
- Heinrich Albert (1604–1651)
- François Dufault (1604–1670)
- Bonifazio Graziani (1604/1605–1664)
- Charles d'Assoucy (1605–1677)
- Orazio Benevoli (1605–1672)
- Antonio Bertali (1605–1669)
- Giacomo Carissimi (1605–1674)
- Francesco Sacrati (1605–1650)
- Johann Vierdanck (c. 1605–1646)
- Jean de Cambefort (1605–1661)
- Charles Coypeau d'Assoucy (1605–1677)
- William Child (1606–1697)
- Michel de La Guerre (c. 1606–1679)
- Aldebrando Subissati (1606–1677)
- Urbán de Vargas (1606–1656)
- Sigmund Theophil Staden (1607–1655)
- Abraham Megerle (1607–1680)
- Philipp Friedrich Böddecker (1607–1683)
- Ferdinand III, Holy Roman Emperor (1608–1657)
- Jacques de Gouy (c. 1610–after 1650)
- Valentin de Bournonville (1610–1663)
- François Cosset (1610–1664)
- Nicolas Hotman (c. 1610–1663)
- João Lourenço Rebelo (1610–1661)
- William Young (c. 1610–1662)
- Nicolas Métru (1610–1668)
- Sébastien Le Camus (c. 1610–1677)
- Leonora Duarte (1610–1678)
- Luigi Battiferri (c. 1610–after 1682)
- Henri Du Mont (1610–1684)
- George Jeffreys (c. 1610–1685)
- Michel Lambert (1610–1696)
- Leonora Baroni (1611–1670)
- Thomas Brewer (1611–c. 1660)
- Pablo Bruna (1611–1679)
- Andreas Hammerschmidt (1611/1612–1675)
- Wolfgang Ebner (1612–1665)
- Jacques Huyn (1613–1652)
- Elisabeth Sophie, Duchess of Brunswick-Lüneburg (1613–1676)
- Thomas Mace (c. 1613–1709?)
- Louis de Mollier (c. 1613–1688) ()
- Giovanni Antonio Rigatti (c. 1613–1648)
- Wilhelm Karges (1613/1614–1699)
- Jean-Baptiste Boësset, Sieur de Dehault (1614–1685)
- Philipp Friedrich Buchner (1614–1669)
- Juan Hidalgo de Polanco (1614–1685)
- Marc'Antonio Pasqualini (1614–1691)
- Franz Tunder (1614–1667)
- Yatsuhashi Kengyo (1614–1685)
- Francesca Campana (c. 1615–1665)
- Heinrich Bach (1615–1692)
- Angelo Michele Bartolotti (c. 1615–1696)
- Guillaume Dumanoir (1615–1697)
- Francesco Corbetta (c. 1615–1681)
- Christopher Gibbons (1615–1676)
- Francisco López Capillas (c. 1615–1673)
- Giovanni Bettini (fl. 1616 – c. 1624)
- Maurizio Cazzati (1616–1678)
- Kaspar Förster (the younger) (1616–1673)
- Johann Jakob Froberger (1616–1667)
- Johann Erasmus Kindermann (1616–1655)
- Jacques de Saint-Luc (1616–c. 1710)
- Matthias Weckmann (c. 1616–1674)
- Giuseppe Olivieri (fl. 1617 – c. 1623)
- Carlo Caproli (c. 1617–c. 1692)
- Nikolaus Hasse (c. 1617–1672)
- Francisco Martins (c. 1617?–1680) ()
- Joan Cererols (1618–1680)
- Abraham van den Kerckhoven (c. 1618–c. 1701)
- José Marín (1618–1699)
- Pierre Robert (c. 1618 – 1699)
- Giulio Cesare Arresti (1619–1701)
- Anthoni van Noordt (c. 1619–1675)
- Johann Rosenmüller (1619–1684)
- Barbara Strozzi (1619–1677)
- Juan García de Zéspedes (c. 1619–1678)
- Joannes Baptista Dolar, also Janez Krstnik Dolar or Jan Křtitel Tolar (c. 1620–1673)
- Adam Drese (c. 1620–1701)
- Isabella Leonarda (1620–1704)
- Johann Heinrich Schmelzer (c. 1620–1680)
- Giovanni Battista Granata (1620/1621–1687)
- Georg Arnold (1621–1676)
- Albertus Bryne (1621–1668)
- Massimiliano Neri (composer) (1621–1666)
- Matthew Locke (c. 1621–1677)
- Georg Neumark (1621–1681)
- Bertrand de Bacilly (1621–1690)
- Heinrich Schwemmer (1621–1696)
- Ercole Bernabei (1622–1687)
- Jean Lacquemant, known as DuBuisson (c. 1622–1680)
- Gaspar de Verlit (1622–1682)
- Dietrich Becker (c. 1623–c. 1679)
- Antonio Cesti (1623–1669)
- Jacopo Melani (1623–1676)
- David Pohle (1624–1695)
- Francesco Provenzale (1624–1704)
- François Roberday (1624–1680)
- Johann Rudolf Ahle (1625–1673)
- Alexandre Gallot (1625–1684)
- Jacques Gallot, le vieux Gallot de Paris (c. 1625–1695)
- Marco Giuseppe Peranda (c. 1625–1675)
- Wolfgang Carl Briegel (1626–1712)
- Louis Couperin (c. 1626–1661)
- Christian Flor (1626–1697)
- Giovanni Legrenzi (1626–1690)
- Charles Mouton (1626–1710)
- Lucas Ruiz de Ribayaz (1626–1667?)
- Nicolas Gigault (c. 1627–1707)
- Johann Caspar Kerll (1627–1693)
- Christoph Bernhard (1628–1692)
- Robert Cambert (c. 1628–1677)
- Samuel Capricornus (1628–1665)
- Constantin Christian Dedekind (1628–1715)
- Gustaf Düben (1628–1690)
- Paul Hainlein (1628–1686)
- Jean-Henri d'Anglebert (1629–1691)
- Lelio Colista (1629–1680)
- Lady Mary Dering (1629–1704)
- Andreas Hofer (1629–1684)
- Johann Michael Nicolai (1629–1685)
- John Banister (c. 1630–1679)
- Cristóbal Galán (c. 1630–1684)
- Filipe da Madre de Deus (c. 1630–c. 1688 or later)
- Carlo Pallavicino (c. 1630–1688)
- Giovanni Antonio Pandolfi Mealli (c. 1630?–1669/1670)
- Antonio Sartorio (1630–1680)
- Vincenzo Albrici (1631–1696)
- Thomas Baltzar (c. 1631–1663)
- Nicolas Lebègue (1631–1702)
- Sebastian Anton Scherer (1631–1712)
- Francesco Antonio Urio (1631/1632–c. 1719)
- Jean-Baptiste Lully (1632–1687)
- Guillaume-Gabriel Nivers (1632–1714)
- Giovanni Battista Vitali (1632–1692)
- Jean-Nicolas Geoffroy (1633–1694)
- Sebastian Knüpfer (1633–1676)
- Joseph Chabanceau de La Barre (1633–1678)
- Pavel Josef Vejvanovský (c. 1633/1639–1693)
- Giuseppe Caruso (fl. 1634)
- Innocent Boutry (1634–1690/95)
- Clamor Heinrich Abel (1634–1696)
- Antonio Draghi (c. 1634–1700)
- Carlo Grossi (c. 1634–1688)
- Adam Krieger (1634–1666)
- Andrés de Sola (1634–1696)
- Pietro Simone Agostini (c. 1635–1680)
- Lambert Chaumont (c. 1635–1712)
- Jacques Thomelin (1635/40–1693)
- Daniel Danielis (1635–1696)
- Johann Wilhelm Furchheim (c. 1635–1682)
- Miguel de Irízar (1635–1684)
- Joannes Florentius a Kempis (1635–after 1711)
- Paul I, Prince Esterházy of Galántha (1635–1713)
- Augustin Pfleger (1635–1686)
- Jacek Różycki (c. 1635–1704)
- Angelo Berardi (c. 1636–1694)
- Giovanni Battista degli Antonii, or degli Antoni (c. 1636?–after 1696)
- Esaias Reusner (1636–1679)
- Dieterich Buxtehude (c. 1637–1707)
- Giovanni Paolo Colonna (1637–1695)
- Johann Georg Ebeling (1637–1676)
- Louis-Nicolas Le Prince (1637–1693)
- Louis Chein (1637–1694)
- Giovanni Maria Pagliardi (1637–1702)
- Bernardo Pasquini (1637–1710)
- Diogo Dias Melgás (1638–1700)
- Giovanni Buonaventura Viviani (1638–c. 1693)
- Pietro degli Antonii (1639–1720)
- António Marques Lésbio (1639–1709)
- Alessandro Melani (1639–1703)
- Johann Christoph Pezel (1639–1694)
- Juan García de Salazar (1639–1710)
- Anthony Beck (fl. 1639 – d. 1674)
- André Raison (1640s–1719)
- Amalia Catharina, Countess of Erbach (1640–1697)
- Antonia Bembo (c. 1640–1720)
- Cristoforo Caresana (c. 1640–1709)
- Giovanni Battista Draghi (c. 1640–1708)
- Carolus Hacquart (c. 1640–1701?)
- Leopold I, Holy Roman Emperor (1640–1705)
- Paolo Lorenzani (1640–1713)
- Carl Rosier (1640–1725)
- Monsieur de Sainte-Colombe, the father (c. 1640–c. 1700)
- Gaspar Sanz (1640–1710)
- Nicolaus Adam Strungk (1640–1700)
- Esther Elizabeth Velkiers (c. 1640–after 1685)
- Maria Francesca Nascinbeni (1640–1680)
- Francesco Beretta (c. 1640 – 1694)
- Wolfgang Caspar Printz (1641–1717)
- Pierre Gaultier, dit Gaultier of Marseille (1642–1696)
- Johann Friedrich Alberti (1642–1710)
- Georg Christoph Bach (1642–1697)
- Johann Christoph Bach (1642–1703)
- Giovanni Maria Bononcini (1642–1678)
- Benedictus Buns, or Benedictus a Sancto Josepho (1642–1716)
- Michelangelo Falvetti (1642–1692)
- Pierre-Richard Menault (1642–1694)
- Friedrich Funcke (1642–1699)
- Jacques Hardel (1643?–1678)
- Marc-Antoine Charpentier (1643–1704)
- Johann Adam Reincken (1643?–1722)
- Alessandro Stradella (1643–1682)
- Ignazio Albertini (1644–1685)
- Heinrich Ignaz Franz von Biber (1644–1704)
- Juan Bautista Cabanilles (1644–1712)
- Maria Cattarina Calegari (1644–1675)
- Johann Samuel Drese (c. 1644–1716)
- Johann Wolfgang Franck (1644–1710)
- Tomás de Torrejón y Velasco (1644–1728)
- Johann Georg Conradi (1645–1699)
- August Kühnel (1645–c. 1700)
- Johann Löhner (1645–1705)
- Carlo Ambrogio Lonati (c. 1645–1710)
- Pierre Tabart (1645–1717)
- Christian Ritter (c. 1645–c. 1725)
- Andreas Werckmeister (1645–1706)
- Juan de Araujo (1646–1712)
- Johann Fischer (1646–1716)
- Rupert Ignaz Mayr (1646–1712)
- René Pignon Descoteaux (c. 1646–1728)
- Johann Theile (1646–1724)
- Pelham Humfrey (1647–1674)
- Antonio Teodoro Ortells (1647–1702)
- Michael Wise (c. 1647–1687)
- Pierre Danican Philidor (1647–1730)
- Johann Michael Bach (1648–1694)
- Johann Melchior Caesar (c. 1648–1692) (, de:s)
- Giovanni Maria Capelli (1648–1726)
- David Funck (1648?–after 1690) ()
- Johann Schelle (1648–1701)
- Poul Christian Schindler (1648–1740)
- Giuseppe Antonio Bernabei (1649–1732)
- John Blow (1649–1708)
- Jacques Boyvin (1649–1706)
- Pieter Bustijn (c. 1649–1729)
- Pascal Collasse (1649–1709)
- Michel Farinel (1649–1726)
- Francesc Guerau (1649–1717/1722)
- Andreas Kneller (1649–1724)
- Johann Philipp Krieger (1649–1725)
- Johann Valentin Meder (1649–1719)
- François-Joseph Salomon (1649–1732)
- Pedro de Araújo (fl. 1662–1705)
- Alba Trissina (born 1622)
- Bartholomäus Aich (fl. 1648)
- Gioan Pietro Del Buono (fl. 1641–1644; d. 1657)
- John Gamble (fl. from 1641, died 1687)
- Gervise Gerrard (16??–16??)
- Bernardo Gianoncelli (fl. early 17th century; d. before 1650)
- Louis Grabu (fl. 1665–1693)
- Nicola Matteis (fl. c. 1670–1698; d. after 1713)
- Peter Mohrhardt, or Morhard (fl. from 1662; d. 1685)
- Bartłomiej Pękiel (died c. 1670)
- Bernardo Sabadini (fl. from 1662; d. 1718)
- Louis Saladin (fl. c. 1670)
- Bernardo Storace (fl. 1664)
- August Verdufen, or Werduwen (17th century) ()

== Late Baroque era composers (born 1650–1699) ==
Composers of the Late Baroque era include the following figures listed by the date of their birth:

- Cataldo Amodei (c. 1650–c. 1695)
- Giovanni Battista Bassani (c. 1650–1716)
- Giovanni Battista Brevi (c. 1650–1725)
- Christian Geist (c. 1650–1711)
- Johann Anton Losy von Losinthal, or Comte d'Logy (c. 1650–1721)
- Guillaume Minoret (c. 1650–1717/1720)
- Juan Francisco de Navas (c. 1650–1719)
- Antonio de Salazar (c. 1650–1715)
- Stanisław Sylwester Szarzyński (c. 1650–c. 1720)
- Theobaldo di Gatti (1650–1727)
- Pietro Torri (1650–1737)
- Robert de Visée (c. 1650–1732/1733)
- Johann Jacob Walther (1650–1717)
- Giovanni Battista Bianchini (after 1650-1708)
- Johann Georg Ahle (1651–1706)
- Petronio Franceschini (1651–1680)
- Domenico Gabrielli (1651/1659–1690)
- Gilles Jullien (c. 1651/1653–1703)
- Johann Krieger (1651–1735)
- Jean-François Lalouette (1651–1728)
- David Petersen (c. 1651–1737)
- Ferdinand Tobias Richter (1651–1711)
- William Turner (1651–1740)
- Johann Philipp Förtsch (1652–1732)
- Romanus Weichlein (1652–1706)
- John Abell (1653–after 1724)
- Arcangelo Corelli (1653–1713)
- Georg Muffat (1653–1704)
- Johann Pachelbel (1653–1706)
- Carlo Francesco Pollarolo (c. 1653–1723)
- Johann Christoph Rothe (1653–1700)
- Agostino Steffani (1653–1728)
- Marc'Antonio Ziani (c. 1653–1715)
- Pietro Antonio Fiocco (1654–1714)
- Servaes de Koninck (c. 1654–c. 1701)
- Christian Liebe (1654–1708)
- Vincent Lübeck (1654–1740)
- Pablo Nassarre (c. 1654–c. 1730)
- Ludovico Roncalli (1654–1713)
- Pierre Bouteiller (1655–1717)
- Sébastien de Brossard (1655–1730)
- Ruggiero Fedeli (c. 1655–1722) ()
- Juan Serqueira de Lima (c. 1655–c. 1726)
- Johann Caspar Ferdinand Fischer (1656–1746)
- Marin Marais (1656–1728)
- Jean-Baptiste Moreau (1656–1733)
- James Paisible, or Jacques Paisible (c. 1656–1721)
- Georg Reutter (1656–1738)
- Thomas Tudway (c. 1656–1726) ()
- Matías Juan de Veana (c. 1656–after 1708)
- Johann Paul von Westhoff (1656–1705)
- Philipp Heinrich Erlebach (1657–1714)
- Michel-Richard de Lalande, or Delalande (1657–1726)
- Gaetano Greco (c. 1657–c. 1728)
- Giuseppe Ottavio Pitoni (1657–1743)
- Damian Stachowicz (1658–1699)
- Giuseppe Torelli (1658–1709)
- Sybrandus van Noordt (1659–1705) ()
- Henry Purcell (1659–1695)
- Francesco Antonio Pistocchi (1659–1726)
- Theodor Schwartzkopff (1659–1732) ()
- Antonio Veracini (1659–1745)
- Giovanni Bianchi (c. 1660 – after 1720)
- Sainte-Colombe, the son (1660–1720)
- Henrico Albicastro, or Johann Heinrich von Weissenburg (c. 1660–after 1730)
- Rosa Giacinta Badalla (c. 1660–c. 1710)
- Francesco Ballaroti (c. 1660–1712) ()
- Bartolomeo Bernardi (c. 1660–1732)
- André Campra (1660–1744)
- Jerónimo de Carrión (1660–1721)
- Sebastián Durón (1660–1716)
- Gottfried Finger (1660–1730)
- Johann Joseph Fux (1660–1741)
- Friedrich Gottlieb Klingenberg (c. 1660?–1720) ()
- Johann Kuhnau (1660–1722)
- Johann Sigismund Kusser (1660–1727)
- Gaspard Le Roux (c. 1660–1707)
- Jacques-François Lochon (c. 1660–c. 1710)
- Monsieur de Sainte-Colombe le fils (the younger) (c. 1660–c. 1720) ()
- Alessandro Scarlatti (1660–1725)
- Johannes Schenck (1660–c. 1712)
- Christian Friedrich Witt (c. 1660–1717)
- Georg Böhm (1661–1733)
- Henri Desmarest (1661–1741)
- Francesco Gasparini (1661–1727)
- Giacomo Antonio Perti (1661–1756)
- Giovanni Lorenzo Lulier (c. 1662?–1700)
- Angiola Teresa Moratori Scanabecchi (1662–1708)
- Jean-Baptiste Drouard de Bousset (1662–1725)
- Pirro Capacelli Albergati (1663–1735)
- Johann Nikolaus Hanff (1663–1711)
- Franz Xaver Murschhauser (1663–1738)
- Jean-Baptiste Matho (1663–1743)
- Nicolas Siret (1663–1754)
- Tomaso Antonio Vitali (1663–1745)
- Friedrich Wilhelm Zachau, or Zachow (1663–1712)
- Jean Mignon (1664–1694)
- Nicolas Bernier (1664–1734)
- Georg Dietrich Leyding, or Leiding (1664–1710)
- Pierre Dandrieu (1664–1733)
- Louis Lully (1664–1734)
- Michele Mascitti (c. 1664–1760)
- Georg Österreich (1664–1735)
- Johann Christoph Pez (1664–1716)
- Daniel Purcell (1664–1717)
- Johann Speth (1664–after 1719)
- Filippo Amadei, "Pippo del Violoncello" (c. 1665–c. 1725)
- Benedikt Anton Aufschnaiter (1665–1742)
- Nicolaus Bruhns (1665–1697)
- Grzegorz Gerwazy Gorczycki (c. 1665/1667–1734)
- Élisabeth Jacquet de La Guerre (1665–1729)
- Joseph Valette de Montigny (1665–1738)
- Jean-Baptiste Lully fils (the younger) (1665–1743)
- Giovanni Maria Ruggieri (c. 1665–c. 1725)
- José de Torres y Martínez Bravo (1665–1738)
- Francisco Valls (1665–1747)
- Gaetano Veneziano (1665–1716)
- Domenico Zanatta (c. 1665–1748) ()
- Jean-Conrad Baustetter (1666–1722)
- Attilio Ariosti (1666–1729)
- Johann Heinrich Buttstett (1666–1727)
- Alphonse d'Eve (1666–1727)
- Michelangelo Faggioli (1666–1733)
- Jean-Féry Rebel (1666–1747)
- Francesco Scarlatti (1666–c. 1741)
- Bernardo Tonini (c. 1666–after 1727) ()
- Georg Bronner (1667–1720) ()
- Antonio Lotti (c. 1667–1740)
- Jean-Louis Lully (1667–1688)
- Michel Pignolet de Montéclair (1667–1737)
- Johann Christoph Pepusch (1667–1752)
- François Couperin (1668–1733)
- John Eccles (1668–1735)
- Jean Gilles (1668–1705)
- Giorgio Gentili (c. 1668–after 1731)
- Georg von Bertouch (1668–1743)
- Jean-Baptiste Gouffet (1669–1729)
- Johann Nicolaus Bach (1669–1753)
- Louis Marchand (1669–1732)
- Alessandro Marcello (1669–1747)
- Andreas Armsdorff (1670–1699)
- Giuseppe Avitrano (c. 1670–1756)
- Giovanni Bononcini (1670–1747)
- Giuseppe Boniventi (1670–1727)
- Christian Ludwig Boxberg (1670–1729)
- Arnold Brunckhorst (1670–1725)
- Louis de Caix d'Hervelois (c. 1670–c. 1760)
- Antonio Caldara (1670–1736)
- Turlough O'Carolan (1670–1738)
- Charles Dieupart (c. 1670–c. 1740)
- Henry Eccles (1670–1742)
- Angelo Michele Besseghi (1670–1744)
- David Kellner (1670–1748)
- Richard Leveridge (1670–1758)
- Benedetto Vinaccesi (c. 1670–1719)
- Jean-Baptiste Volumier, or Woulmyer (1670–1728)
- Johann Hugo von Wilderer (1670/1671–1724)
- Tomaso Giovanni Albinoni (1671–1751)
- Giuseppe Aldrovandini (1671–1707)
- Johann Christoph Bach (1671–1721)
- Azzolino della Ciaja, or della Ciaia (1671–1755)
- Gaspard Corrette (c. 1671–before 1733)
- Charles-Hubert Gervais (1671–1744)
- Teodorico Pedrini (1671–1746)
- François Estienne (1671–1755)
- Louis-Nicolas Blondel (?–1671)
- Robert Valentine, also known as Roberto Valentino (c. 1671–1747)
- Carlo Agostino Badia (1672–1738)
- Francesco Antonio Bonporti (1672–1749)
- André Cardinal Destouches (1672–1749)
- Nicolas de Grigny (1672–1703)
- François Duval (1672–1728)
- Francesco Mancini (1672–1737)
- Antoine Forqueray (1672–1745)
- Georg Caspar Schürmann (1672/1673–1751)
- Petrus Hercules Brehy, or Pierre-Hercule Bréhy (1673–1737) ()
- Antonio de Literes (1673–1747)
- Santiago de Murcia (1673–1739)
- Jeremiah Clarke (c. 1674–1707)
- Reinhard Keiser (1674–1739)
- Pierre Dumage (c. 1674–1751)
- Jacques-Martin Hotteterre, called Le Romain (1674–1763)
- Giovanni Battista Bianchi (flourished 1675)
- Evaristo Felice Dall'Abaco (1675–1742)
- Michel de la Barre (c. 1675–1745)
- Louis de La Coste, or Lacoste (c. 1675–c. 1750)
- Pietro Paolo Laurenti (1675–1719)
- Jacques de Bournonville (1675–175?)
- Giovanni Porta (c. 1675–1755)
- Obadiah Shuttleworth (c. 1675?–1734)
- Francesco Venturini (c. 1675–1745)
- Johann Bernhard Bach (1676–1749)
- Diogenio Bigaglia (1676–1745)
- Louis-Nicolas Clérambault (1676–1749)
- Thomas-Louis Bourgeois (1676–1750)
- Giacomo Facco (1676–1753)
- Nicolas Racot de Grandval (1676–1753)
- Wolff Jakob Lauffensteiner (1676–1754)
- Giuseppe Maria Orlandini (1676–1760)
- John Weldon (1676–1736)
- Jean-Baptiste Anet (1676–1755)
- Johann Ludwig Bach (1677–1731)
- Antonio Maria Bononcini (1677–1726)
- Giovanni Carlo Maria Clari (1677–1754)
- Johann Wilhelm Drese (1677–1745)
- Francesco Nicola Fago (1677–1745)
- Jean-Baptiste Morin (1677–1745)
- Alexandre Villeneuve (1677–1758)
- Christian Petzold (1677–1733)
- Bonaventure Gilles (1678?–1758)
- William Croft (1678–1727)
- Ferdinando Antonio Lazzari (1678–1754)
- Giovanni Antonio Piani, or Jean-Antoine Desplanes (1678–1760)
- Antonio Vivaldi (1678–1741)
- Manuel de Zumaya (c. 1678–1755)
- Georg Friedrich Kauffmann (1679–1735)
- Domenico Sarro (1679–1744)
- Pietro Filippo Scarlatti (1679–1750)
- Johann Christian Schieferdecker (1679–1732)
- Jan Dismas Zelenka (1679–1745)
- Françoise-Charlotte de Senneterre Ménétou (1679–1745)
- Pietro Castrucci (1679–1752)
- Toussaint Bertin de la Doué (c. 1680–1743)
- William Corbett (1680–1748)
- Giuseppe Fedeli, or Joseph Saggione (c. 1680–c. 1745)
- Jean-Adam Guilain (c. 1680–after 1739)
- Jean-Baptiste Loeillet of London (1680–1730)
- Giovanni Mossi (c. 1680?–1742)
- Jacques Morel (c. 1680–c. 1740)
- Jean-Baptiste Stuck (1680–1755)
- Richard Jones (1680–1744)
- Emanuele d'Astorga (1681–1736)
- Carl Heinrich Biber (1681–1749)
- Francesco Bartolomeo Conti (1681–1732)
- Johann Mattheson (1681–1764)
- Anne Danican Philidor (1681–1728)
- Pierre Danican Philidor (1681–1731)
- Giovanni Reali (c. 1681–after 1727) ()
- Georg Philipp Telemann (1681–1767)
- Giuseppe Valentini (1681–1753)
- Paolo Benedetto Bellinzani (1682–1757)
- Giacobbe Cervetto (c. 1682–1783)
- Jean-François Dandrieu (c. 1682–1738)
- Jean-Joseph Mouret (1682–1738)
- Valentin Rathgeber (1682–1750)
- Johann Christian Schickhardt (c. 1682–1762)
- Pietro Baldassare (c. 1683–after 1768)
- Roque Ceruti (c. 1683–1760)
- Christoph Graupner (1683–1760)
- Johann David Heinichen (1683–1729)
- Jean-Philippe Rameau (1683–1764)
- Giovanni Veneziano (1683–1742)
- François d'Agincourt (1684–1758)
- François Bouvard (c. 1684–1760)
- Bohuslav Matěj Černohorský (1684–1742)
- Francesco Durante (1684–1755)
- Francesco Manfredini (1684–1762)
- Johann Jacob de Neufville (1684–1712)
- Johann Theodor Roemhildt (1684–1756)
- Johann Gottfried Walther (1684–1748)
- Giuseppe Matteo Alberti (1685–1751)
- Johann Sebastian Bach (1685–1750)
- Louis-Antoine Dornel (c. 1685–1765)
- Lodovico Giustini (1685–1743)
- Henri-Guillaume Hamal (1685–1752)
- George Frideric Handel (1685–1759)
- Václav Gunther Jacob (1685–1734) ()
- Jacques Loeillet (1685–1748)
- Roland Marais (c. 1685–c. 1750)
- Wilhelm Hieronymus Pachelbel (c. 1685–1764)
- Domenico Scarlatti (1685–1757)
- Pietro Giuseppe Gaetano Boni (c. 1686–after 1741) ()
- Jean-Joseph Fiocco (1686–1746)
- François Campion (1686–1747)
- Benedetto Marcello (1686–1739)
- Nicola Porpora (1686–1768)
- Giovanni Battista Somis (1686–1763)
- Jean-Baptiste Semaillé (1687–1730)
- Johann Adam Birkenstock (1687–1733)
- Henry Carey (1687–1743)
- Willem de Fesch (1687–1761)
- Johann Ernst Galliard (1687–1749)
- Francesco Geminiani (1687–1762)
- Johann Georg Pisendel (1687–1755)
- Jean Baptiste Senaillé (1687–1730)
- Jean-Baptiste-Maurice Quinault (1687–1745)
- Sylvius Leopold Weiss (1687–1750)
- Michele Falco (c. 1688–after 1732)
- Johann Friedrich Fasch (1688–1758)
- Jacob Klein (1688–1748) ()
- Jean-Baptiste Loeillet de Ghent (1688–1720)
- Joseph Michel (1688–1736)
- Thomas Roseingrave (1688–1766)
- Domenico Zipoli (1688–1726)
- Jacques Aubert (1689–1753)
- Jean-Baptiste Cappus (1689–1751)
- William Babell (c. 1689–1723)
- Joseph Bodin de Boismortier (1689–1755)
- Jan Josef Ignác Brentner (1689–1742)
- Charles Levens (1689–1764)
- Pietro Gnocchi (1689–1775)
- Jean-Baptiste Quentin (before 1690–c. 1742) (not to be confused with his son 1718–c. 1750)
- Francesco Barsanti (1690–1775)
- Jean Daniel Braun (c. 1690?–c. 1740)
- Giuseppe Antonio Brescianello (c. 1690 – 1758)
- Fortunato Chelleri (1690–1757)
- François Colin de Blamont (1690–1760)
- Giovanni Antonio Giai, or Giay, Giaj (1690–1764)
- Johann Tobias Krebs (1690–1762)
- Gottlieb Muffat (1690–1770)
- Jacques-Christophe Naudot (c. 1690–1762)
- Charles Theodore Pachelbel (1690–1750)
- Manuel José de Quirós (c. 1690?–1765)
- Gottfried Heinrich Stölzel (1690–1749)
- Carlo Tessarini (1690–1766)
- Francesco Maria Veracini (1690–1768)
- Leonardo Vinci (c. 1690–1730)
- Jean-Baptiste Niel (Nieil or Nielle) (1690–1775)
- Robert Woodcock (c. 1690 – 1728)
- Francesco Feo (1691–1761)
- Jan Francisci (1691–1758)
- Conrad Friedrich Hurlebusch (1691–1765)
- Louis Homet (1691–1767)
- Martin Berteau (1691–1771)
- Geminiano Giacomelli or Jacomelli (1692–1740)
- Antonio Palella (1692–1761)
- Giovanni Alberto Ristori (1692–1753)
- Giuseppe Tartini (1692–1770)
- Unico Wilhelm van Wassenaer (1692–1766)
- Louis Lemaire (1693?–1750?)
- Laurent Belissen (1693–1762)
- Šimon Brixi (1693–1735)
- Pierre-Gabriel Buffardin (1693–1768)
- Christoph Förster (1693–1745)
- Gregor Joseph Werner (1693–1766)
- Louis-Claude Daquin (1694–1772)
- Johann Samuel Endler (1694–1762)
- Pierre-Claude Foucquet (1694–1772)
- Leonardo Leo (1694–1744)
- Antonín Reichenauer (c. 1694–1730)
- Johan Helmich Roman (1694–1758)
- Luigi Merci (c.1695–1750)
- Johann Lorenz Bach (1695–1773)
- Pietro Locatelli (1695–1764)
- Marie-Anne-Catherine Quinault (1695–1791)
- Giuseppe Sammartini (1695–1750)
- Ernst Gottlieb Baron (1696–1760)
- Pierre Février (1696–1760)
- Jean-Philippe Borbollono (1696–?)
- Maurice Greene (1696–1755)
- Johann Melchior Molter (1696–1765)
- Johann Caspar Vogler (1696–1763)
- Andrea Zani (1696–1757)
- Esprit-Antoine Blanchard (1696–1770)
- Josse Boutmy (1697–1779)
- Cornelius Heinrich Dretzel (1697–1775)
- Louis-Maurice de La Pierre (1697–1753)
- Adam Falckenhagen (1697–1754)
- Johann Christian Hertel (1697/1699–1754)
- Jean-Marie Leclair l'aîné (1697–1764)
- Giuseppe de Majo (1697–1771)
- Giovanni Benedetto Platti (1697–1763)
- Johann Pfeiffer (1697–1761)
- Johann Joachim Quantz (1697–1773)
- Francesco Antonio Vallotti (1697–1780)
- Pietro Auletta (c. 1698–1771)
- Antonio Bioni (1698–1739)
- Henry Madin (1698–1748)
- Riccardo Broschi (c. 1698–1756)
- François Francoeur (1698–1787)
- František Jiránek (1698–1778)
- Nicola Bonifacio Logroscino (1698–c. 1764)
- Gaetano Maria Schiassi (1698–1754)
- Jean-Baptiste Forqueray le fils (1699–1782)
- Joseph Gibbs (1699–1788)
- Johann Adolph Hasse (1699–1783)
- Juan Francés de Iribarren (1699–1767)
- Jan Zach (1699–1773)
- Jean-Baptiste Dutartre (16..–1749)
- Ignazio Pollice or Pulici (fl. 1684–1705)
- John Baston (fl. 1708–1739)
- Charles Bâton (fl. 1733–1758)
- Domenico Della Bella (fl. c. 1700–1715)
- Michielina Della Pietà (fl. c. 1701–1744)
- Charles Dollé (fl. 1735–1755; d. after 1755)
- Giovanni Giorgi (fl. from 1719; d. 1762)
- Caterina Benedicta Grazianini (born 17th century; fl. from 1705)
- Maria Margherita Grimani (b. before 1700; fl. 1713–1718)
- Benoit Guillemant (fl. 1746–1757)
- Gottfried Lindemann (fl. 1713–1741; d. 1741)
- Le Sieur de Machy (d. after 1692)
- Jacques Morel (fl. c. 1700–1749)
- Antonio Orefice (fl. 1708–1734)
- Mrs Philarmonica (fl. 1715)
- Julie Pinel (fl. 1710–1737)
- Marieta Morosina Priuli (fl. 1665)
- Camilla de Rossi (fl. 1707–1710)
- Giovanni Zamboni (later 17th century–after 1718)

== Early Galante era composers – transition from Baroque to Classical (born 1700 and after) ==
Composers during the transition from the Baroque to Classical eras, sometimes seen as the beginning of the Galante era, include the following figures listed by their date of birth:

- Romano Antonio Piacentino (c. 18th century)
- Louis-Joseph Marchand (17??–1743)
- Philibert Delavigne (c. 1700–1750)
- Francesco Biscogli (after 1700–after 1750)
- Mlle Guédon de Presles (early 18th century–1754)
- Johann Bernhard Bach (the younger) (1700–1743)
- João Rodrigues Esteves (1700–1751)
- François-Lupien Grenet (1700–1753)
- Jean-Baptiste Masse (c. 1700–c. 1757)
- Sebastian Bodinus (c. 1700–1759)
- Louis-Antoine Lefèbvre (1700–1763)
- Domenico Dall'Oglio (c. 1700–1764)
- Nicola Fiorenza (after 1700–1764)
- Michel Blavet (1700–1768)
- Christophe Moyreau (1700–1774)
- Giovanni Battista Sammartini (1700–1775)
- Johan Agrell (1701–1765)
- François Rebel (1701–1775)
- Jean-Pierre Guignon (1702–1774)
- Alessandro Besozzi (1702–1775)
- Johann Ernst Eberlin (1702–1762)
- José de Nebra (1702–1768)
- Francisco António de Almeida (c. 1702–1755)
- Joseph-Hector Fiocco (1703–1741)
- René Drouard de Bousset (1703–1760)
- John Frederick Lampe (1703–1751)
- Johann Gottlieb Graun (1703–1771)
- Jean-Marie Leclair le cadet (the younger) (1703–1777)
- Carlo Zuccari (1703–1792)
- Carlos Seixas (1704–1742)
- Rosanna Scalfi Marcello (1704 or 1705–after 1742)
- Carl Heinrich Graun (1704–1759)
- Giovanni Battista Pescetti (c. 1704–c. 1766)
- František Tůma (1704–1774)
- Philippe Courbois (1705–1730)
- Nicolas Chédeville (1705–1782)
- Henri-Jacques de Croes (1705–1786)
- Michael Christian Festing (1705–1752)
- Louis-Gabriel Guillemain (1705–1770)
- Johann Peter Kellner (1705–1772)
- Peter Prelleur (c. 1705?–1741) ()
- Pancrace Royer (1705–1755)
- Andrea Bernasconi (c. 1706–1784)
- Carlo Cecere (1706–1761)
- Baldassare Galuppi (1706–1785)
- Johann Gottfried Donati (1706–1782)
- William Hayes (1706–1777)
- Giovanni Battista Martini, or Padre Martini (1706–1784)
- Jean Barrière (1707–1747)
- Thomas Chilcot (c. 1707–1766) ()
- Michel Corrette (1707–1795)
- Ignacio de Jerusalem (c. 1707–1769)
- Johann Baptist Georg Neruda (c. 1707–c. 1780)
- Domenico Paradies or Pietro Domenico Paradisi (1707–1791)
- António Teixeira (1707–1769)
- Felix Benda (1708–1768)
- Egidio Duni (1708–1775)
- Johann Gottlieb Janitsch (1708–1763)
- Václav Jan Kopřiva, known as Urtica (1708–1789)
- Georg Reutter (the younger) (1708–1772)
- Johann Adolph Scheibe (1708–1776)
- Francesco Araja (1709–after 1762)
- Franz Benda (1709–1786)
- Princess Wilhelmine of Prussia (1709–1758)
- Christoph Schaffrath (1709–1763)
- Charles Avison (1709–1770)
- Domenico Alberti (c. 1710–1740)
- André-Joseph Exaudet (1710–1762)
- Joseph Abaco, or dall'Abaco (1710–1805)
- Thomas Arne (1710–1778)
- Wilhelm Friedemann Bach (1710–1784)
- Élisabeth de Haulteterre (fl. 1737–1768)
- Salvatore Lanzetti (1710–1780)
- Giovanni Battista Pergolesi (1710–1736)
- William Boyce (1711–1779)
- Ignaz Holzbauer (1711–1783)
- Gaetano Latilla (1711–1788)
- Davide Perez (1711–1778)
- Chadwille Wagon (1711-1799)
- Barbara of Portugal (1711–1758)
- Charles-Henri de Blainville (1711–1769)
- Jean-Joseph Cassanéa de Mondonville (1711–1772)
- James Oswald (1711–1769)
- Frederick the Great (1712–1786)
- John Hebden (1712–1765)
- Giacomo Puccini senior (1712–1781)
- Jean-Jacques Rousseau (1712–1778)
- John Christopher Smith (1712–1795)
- John Stanley (1712–1786)
- Antoine Dauvergne (1713–1797)
- Johan Henrik Freithoff (1713–1767)
- Johann Ludwig Krebs (1713–1780)
- Johann Nicolaus Mempel (1713–1747)
- Carl Philipp Emanuel Bach (1714–1788)
- Niccolò Jommelli (1714–1774)
- John Alcock (1715–1806)
- Jacques Duphly (1715–1789)
- Josef Seger (1716–1782)
- Princess Philippine Charlotte of Prussia (1716–1801)
- Johann Wenzel Anton Stamitz (1717–1757)
- Richard Mudge (1718–1763)
- Abraham Caceres (1718–1740)
- Leopold Mozart (1719–1787)
- Joan Baptista Pla i Agustí (c. 1720–1773)
- Pieter Hellendaal (1721–1799)
- Matthias Vanden Gheyn (1721–1785)
- Georg Anton Benda (1722–1795)
- Anna Amalia, Abbess of Quedlinburg (1723–1787)
- Rafael Antonio Castellanos (c. 1725–1791)
- Karl Kohaut (1726–1784)
- Tommaso Traetta (1727–1779)
- Henri Moreau (1728–1803)
- Pierre van Maldere (1729–1768)
- Antonio Soler (1729–1783)
- Capel Bond (1730–1790)
- Gabriele Leone (c. 1735–1790)
- Simon Simon (1735?–1787?)
- José Joaquim dos Santos (1747?–1801)
- Alexander Maasmann (fl. 1713)
- Santa della Pietà (fl. c. 1725–1750, d. after 1774)

== See also ==
- Baroque music
- List of classical music composers by era
- List of composers by name
- Women in Music

There is considerable overlap near the beginning and end of this era. See lists of composers for the previous and following eras:

- List of Renaissance composers
- List of Classical era composers
