= Bousset =

Bousset is a French surname. Notable people with it include:

- Wilhelm Bousset, German theologian
- Jean-Baptiste Drouart de Bousset, French composer
- René Drouart de Bousset, French composer and organist

== See also ==
- Bossuet, surname
