= Hans Brachrogge =

Danish composer

Hans Brachrogge (c. 1590 – c. 1638) was a Danish singer and composer.

His birth and death as well as his place of birth is unknown although he is known to have studied under Melchior Borchgrevinck and accompanied Borchgrevinck and Hans Nielsen to study with Giovanni Gabrieli 1599–1600 in Venice. He was also one of the Danish musicians present in London at the marriage of James I to Anne of Denmark, the sister of Christian IV In 1611.

In 1619 he published a collection Madrigaletti a III voci, første bind which is his only composition that has lasted until today. It also featured two madrigals of Mogens Pedersøn.
