= Antony Bek =

Antony Bek may refer to:

- Antony Bek (bishop of Durham) (died 1311), 13th–14th century Prince-Bishop of Durham
- Antony Bek (bishop of Norwich) (1279–1343), 14th century Bishop of Norwich, kinsman and namesake of the former

== See also ==
- Anthony Beck (died 1674), English composer, lay clerk, and minor canon
