= Waissel =

Waissel is a surname. Notable people with the surname include:

- Katie Waissel (born 1986), English singer-songwriter
- Matthäus Waissel (c. 1540–1602), German lutenist, editor of music, and writer
