= Maria Maddalena Musi =

- Also known as: La Mignatta, La Mignatti
- Born: 18 June 1669; Bologna, Italy
- Died: 2 May 1751( Age 81) Bologna, Italy
- Instrument: Soprano
- Spouse: Pietro degli Antonii

Maria Maddalena Musi, often referred to as La Mignatta or La Mignatti, (18 June 1669 – 2 May 1751) was an Italian soprano who performed regularly on the opera stage in Italy from 1688 until her marriage to the composer Pietro degli Antonii in 1703. After this, she performed infrequently until as late as 1726. She was supported in her career as a musician by Ferdinando Carlo Gonzaga, Duke of Mantua. An immensely popular singer, by the year 1700 she was the highest paid singer on the Italian Peninsula.

== Biography ==
The daughter of Antonio Musi and his wife Lucrezia, Maria Maddalena Musi was born in Bologna on 18 June 1669. It is speculated that she was given the nickname La Mignatti (English: "the Leech") from the maiden name of her mother, Lucrezia Mignati. She began working as an opera singer as early as 1688 when she appeared as Amore in Amor non inteso (composer unknown) in Reggio nell’Emilia. She became a salaried musician in the court of Ferdinando Carlo Gonzaga, Duke of Mantua on 24 June 1689.

The salary Musi received from the Duke was small, but provided her other career advantages. While technically a court musician, she spent most of her time traveling the Italian provinces to perform in opera houses in various cities. She was given the official title of "virtuosa" and a passport issued by the duke, an arrangement which enabled her to use the Duke as her agent in negotiating contracts and ensuring she was paid by the theaters that employed her. By 1700 she was the highest paid singer on the Italian Peninsula, commanding a performance fee of 500 doppie (the Italian equivalent to the Spanish doubloon). She remained in the Duke's employ until at least 1702.

In her first year in Duke Gonzaga's employ, Musi performed in the operas Teodora clemente by Bernardo Sabadini, Guistino by Giovanni Legrenzi, and Siracusano by Giacomo Antonio Perti. During her career she performed in opera houses in Bologna, Genoa, Milan, Modena, Naples, Parma, and Piacenza, becoming an enormously popular singer across Italy. In 1694 she was given by Ferdinando de' Medici, Grand Prince of Tuscany a "large silver bowl filled by sonnets all bordered with lace and gold fringe, enough to garnish a dress" that was presented to her at a curtain call.

Musi mostly retired from the stage in 1703, marrying the Bolognese composer Pietro degli Antonii that same year. At the time of her marriage she brought to her husband a dowry of 75,000 lire. She occasionally sang publicly after her marriage, giving her last opera performance in 1726 in Ferrara in La fedeltà creduta tradimento (composer unknown).

Musi died in Bologna on 2 May 1751. She is the subject of the biography La Mignatta: Maria Maddalena Musi, cantatrice bolognese famosa, 1669–1751 (1930, Zanichelli).

== Bibliography ==
- Haag, John (1999). "Musi, Maria Maddalena (1669–1751)". In Commire, Anne; Klezmer, Deborah (eds.). Women in World History: A Biographical Encyclopedia. Vol. 11. Yorkin Publications.
- Rosselli, John (1995). Singers of Italian Opera: The History of a Profession. Cambridge University Press. ISBN 9780521426978.
- Vitali, Carlo (1997). "Italy — political, religious, and musical contexts". In Burrows, Donald (ed.). The Cambridge Companion to Handel. Cambridge University Press. ISBN 9780521456135.
- Waeber, Jacqueline (2022). The Cambridge Companion to Seventeenth-Century Opera. Cambridge University Press. ISBN 978-1108915915.
