= Hans Nielsen (composer) =

Danish composer

Hans Nielsen (1580–1626) was a Danish composer. He was sent with Melchior Borchgrevinck, Truid Aagesen, Wilhelm Egbertsen, and Mogens Pedersøn to study with Giovanni Gabrieli in Venice 1599–1600. A result of his studies was his Opus 1 madrigal collection of 1606, published under his Italianized name Giovanni Fonteio. This set of 21 madrigals was the first such collection by a Danish composer, two years before Pedersøn's. He served as lutenist at the court of Christian IV as after Pedersøn's death in 1623 Nielsen was promoted to Deputy Kapellmeister, but left the court the following year.

== Works, editions and recordings ==
- Il primo libro di madrigali, 1606
- T'amo, mia vita from Il primo libro di madrigali, 1606 – on Music from the time of Christian IV – Madrigals from the South to the North. Emma Kirkby, Consort of Musicke, Anthony Rooley. BIS
