= Johann Vierdanck =

German composer and musician

Johann Vierdanck (also Virdanck, Vyrdanck, Feyertagk, Feyerdank, Fierdanck; ca. 1605–1646) was a German violinist, cornettist, and composer of the Baroque period.

== Life ==
Vierdanck was born near Dresden. In 1615 he joined the court chapel of Dresden, where he became a student of Heinrich Schütz and of William Brade. His instrumental works were influenced by the Italian violinist Carlo Farina, also active in the Dresden court.

After visits to Copenhagen and Lübeck, Vierdanck occupied the post of organist in Stralsund from 1635 until his death. He was buried in Stralsund on 1 April 1646.

The group Parnassi Musici has recorded several of his instrumental works, from his 1641 publication, for the CD label Classic Produktion Osnabrück.

== Compositions ==
- Instrumental
  - Erster Theil Newer Pavanen, Gagliarden, Balletten vnd Correnten m. 2 V. u. einem Violon nebenst dem basso continuo (1637, Greifswald)
  - Ander Theil darinnen begriffen etliche Capricci, Canzoni vnd Sonaten mit 2. 3. 4. und 5. Instrumenten ohne und mit dem Basso Continuo (1641, Rostock)
- Vocal Music
  - Erster Theil Geistlichen Concerten für 2 - 4 St. und B.c. (Greifswald, 1641/43)
  - Ander Theil Geistlicher Concerten mit 3. 4. 5. 6. 7. 8. vnd 9. St. nebenst einem gedoppelten B.c. (Rostok, 1643)
  - Cantate: Der Herr hat seinen Engeln befohlen
  - Cantate: Ich freue mich im Herrn (Greifswald, 1643)
  - Cantate: Stehe auf, meine Freundin
  - 1 Motet for four voices and B.c. (1641)

== Recordings ==
- Johann Vierdanck. 20 Capricci, Canzoni & Sonatas. Parnassi musici. CPO 2007
- The Trio Sonata in 17th Century-Germany. London Baroque. [therein: Suite A-Dur]. BIS 2008
- Machet die Tore Weit. Innsbrucker Capellknaben, Howard Arman. [therein: Ich verkündige euch große Freude]. Tyrolis 1997
- Die Herrlichkeit der Erden muß Rauch und Asche werden. Musik und Poesie aus der Zeit des 30jährigen Krieges. Musica Fiorita, Daniela Dolci. [therein: Capriccio Nr. 17, Singet dem Herrn]. AM 1997
- Wedding Motets. Weser Renaissance, Manfred Cordes. [therein: Capriccio, Ich freue mich im Herren]. CPO 2006
- His Majestys Sagbutts Grand Tour. His Majestys Sagbutts & Cornetts. [therein: Sonata 28, Sonata 31 ("Als ich einmal Lust bekam"). Hyperion 1996
