= Maciej Wronowicz =

Polish composer

Maciej H. Wronowicz (fl. 1680s) was a Polish composer, and from 1680 to 1684 capelmeister in Włocławek.

== Surviving works ==
De profundis for 2 sopranos, bass and basso continuo, a Laudate Dominum for 2 sopranos, bass, 2 violins, viola b.c., In dulci iubilo for soprano, 2 violins and b.c., a Lauda Sion for soprano, alto, tenor, bass, 2 violins, viola i b.c.

== Recordings ==
- Exportatio defuncti, on Damian Stachowicz: Missa pro defunctis, Bornus Consort Dux 2013
