= Melchior Borchgrevinck =

- Born: 1572; Netherlands
- Died: 20 December 1632 (aged 59–60); Copenhagen, Denmark
- Occupation: Court Kapellmeister

Melchior Borchgrevinck (1572 – 20 December 1632) was a Dutch-Danish musician, composer, and court Kapellmeister. He was born to Bonaventura Borchgrevinck, a Dutch-Danish musician and court Kapellmeister. He had three siblings: two sisters and a brother, Heinrich.

On 1 January 1587 Frederick II appointed Dutchman Bonaventura Borchgrevinck as conductor for his musicians and singers, because a large contingent were Dutch nationals. The orchestra was composed of 15 trumpeters, 9 instrumentalists (strings and woodwinds) and 20 singers. In July of the same year, Bonaventura Borchgrevinck was fired for reasons unknown, but son Melchior, an instrumentalist, was in the king's service the rest of his life.

A year later, in 1588, the king died and his minor son Christian became King Christian IV. From then until his coronation in 1596, his regents cut back on expenses at court. After his coronation the king improved upon the Royal Music Corps, turning it into one of the finest in Europe. In time Melchior Borchgrevinck was recognized as a leader amongst his fellow musicians. The number of instrumentalists was increased to 15. 23 singers and 33 trumpeters were added. A fanfare from the coronation feast called "Melchers Musica" may have been written by Melchior Borchgrevinck.

Borchgrevinck was repeatedly sent on foreign travel in the music service to Danzig and London to buy instruments and to Venice in particular to learn from Giovanni Gabrieli. He was the leader of a group which was composed of singers Wilhelm Egbertsen (1596–1599) and Truid Aagesen (1596–1621) and instrumentalists Hans Nielsen (1599–1624) and Mogens Pedersøn (about 1585–1623).

Over the years his salary increased several times and in 1601 he became canon of Roskilde. Canonry, at that time, was a sort of lifetime wage or pension and related housing that was awarded to the King's officers instead of or in addition to actual wages. From 1611 he was the de facto leader of music and from 1618 he held the title of court Kapellmeister. In 1627, because of the high cost of warfare the king had to reduce government spending and he fired Borchgrevinck at which time he moved to Roskilde and lived there. He was reinstated in March 1631 but died in 1632. His great-grandson Leonard Christian Borchgrevinck founded the Norwegian branch of the family whose descendants can still be found in Norway as well as the United States.

== Music ==
As is typical for composers from this period in the History of Denmark very little of his music survived to this day. Borchgrevinck published a madrigal collection in 2 volumes: "Giardino di nuovo bellissimo varii fiori musicali scieltissimi" (Copenhagen 1605–06). Most numbers are by other composers, but a few are by him. The following year he published: "IX Psalms of David, with four votes rimvis exposed" (Copenhagen 1607). This work is probably lost. A dance for 5 Instruments was published in the Paduanen and Galliarden Collection, volume 1 (Hamburg 1607).

== Other Musicians with Christian IV ==
William Brade (1594–1596, 1599–1606 and 1620–1622), John Dowland (1598–1606), Jan Tollius (1601–1603), Vincentius Bertholusius (1607–1608) and later Heinrich Schütz (1633–35 and 1642–1644).
