= Bertin Quentin =

French classical violinist and composer

- Born: 1690
- Died: 1767 (aged 76–77)
- Occupation: Composer
- Instrument: Violin

Bertin Quentin, called the elder (1690–1767) was a French classical violinist and composer.

== Biography ==
Bertin Quentin called the elder, brother of Jean-Baptiste Quentin, called the young, started in 1706 as a violinist at the Académie royale de musique (later Paris Opera). In 1713, after having participated in the "Grand Chœur", he played just behind Michel-Richard de Lalande at the second desk of the first violins. After the departure of a certain Jacques Buret, he became bass violin player with Les Vingt-quatre Violons du Roi in 1720. In 1749 he retired and settled in Ermont where he died. In 1764 his name disappeared from the Royal Academy's pension list.

Bertin Quentin left us a book of "10 Sonatas for the Violin Alone and for the Flute with Continuous Basso" which was on sale among others chez l'auteur rue St. Martin vis-à-vis la fontaine Maubué
