= François Cappus =

French composer

François Cappus (16?? – Dijon, November 1716) was a French composer.

== Early life ==
François Cappus was the son of legal counselor, Maitre Blaise Cappus, Bailiff for Parlement at Aix en Provence. He married Anne Hervelin (16?? - Dijon, March 1692). They were buried together in Saint-Etienne church of Dijon. The couple had three sons, among them the composer Jean Cappus, and three daughters.

== Career ==
Shortly after his death, Cappus was referred to as a ‘good organist who had a healthy appetite, he died at a ripe old age’. He was also a singer at Dijon Cathedral, and was appointed to an official post in 1683 to ‘sing at all the important events’.

== Works ==
A dozen of his vocal compositions have survived, sometimes erroneously attributed to his son Jean Cappus.

=== 1693 ===
- Air for 1 singer and continuo
- Printemps, gardez-vous bien.

=== 1694 ===
Six airs for 1 singer and continuo

- Vous estes insensible au tourment,
- Je meurs (bis) tous les jours,
- Quand, pressé par l'excès,
- Amour, avant que ma constance,
- Taisez-vous (bis) tendres mouvements,
- Que ces vastes forests solitaires.
- Two airs
- Que l'amour est charmant, for three voices,
- Quand le feu fait sentir, for one singer with a recitative for bass “air à boire”.

=== 1699 ===
- Four airs
- Vous cachez avec soin vos peines,
- Pour n'être point pilotte téméraire,
- Reviens, affreux Hyver,
- Que l'amour est charmant et doux, for three voices.
- s.d. Air
- Vous cachez avec soin vos peines, bergers…

=== 1700 ===
- Henrici Julii Borboni primi é Regio Sanguine principis laudes, Ballet en deux parties, mêlé de chant
- Three airs
- Que Bacchus est charmant !, air à boire
- Voulez-vous savoir qui des deux, air à boire
- Le berger Tircis, vaux-de-ville.

== Source ==
- Dunford, Jonathan, and Beuvard Yvan. (2017), "Jean (-Baptiste) Cappus – the forgotten violist: an inventory of his life and works", The Viola da Gamba Society Journal, vol. 11, pp. 46–64, ISSN 2513-9029
