= Johann Gottfried Donati =

German Baroque composer

Johann Gottfried Donati (Leipzig, 1706 – Greiz, 1782) was a German Baroque composer. Donati's father and grandfather were organ-builders in Saxony. He was organist in Greiz for 50 years and a friend of organ-builder Gottfried Silbermann.

== Works, editions and recordings ==
Partial cantata cycles for 1737, 1742, and 1745 - mainly lost in the Greiz town fire in 1802, but a few copies survive in Mügeln and Bösenrode parish churches. His passions and chamber works are not preserved.

- Cantata Mein Hertzens-Haus bereite dich Klaus Mertens, Accademia Daniel, cond. Shalev Ad-El, 2007.
