= John Okeover =

English church musician

John Okeover, also spelled Okever or Oker, was an English organist and composer.

== Life and career ==
Okeover succeeded Richard Browne as vicar-choral and organist of Wells Cathedral on 16 February 1619. He graduated M.B. from New College, Oxford, on 5 July 1633. On 2 June 1634, when master of the choristers at Wells, he was charged with "having given notice to the vicars that there should be no antumne sung in steede of Nunc dimittis or Benedictus, but only according to the forme of common prayer", without first consulting with the canons resident. He answered that he was commanded by the bishop to give the notice, but the dean pronounced him contumacious, and removed him from his office of vicar for a week.

He appears to have married Elizabeth, daughter of John Beaumont, a member of a well-known family in Wells. John Beaumont left in his will, dated 5 March 1634, legacies to his "daughter Elizabeth and to her husband John Oker".

Okeover was a writer of fancies. Five of his pieces, together with a pavan, all in five parts, are in British Library Add. MS. 17786, ff. 19–25. Another fantasia by Okeover, in five parts, is in Add. MS. 17792, f. 92.

== Attribution ==
- This article incorporates text from a publication now in the public domain: "Okeover, John". Dictionary of National Biography. London: Smith, Elder & Co. 1885–1900.
