= Luigi Merci =

English composer

Luigi Merci or Louis Mercy (c. 1695–1768) was a composer of the Baroque era.

Merci was born around 1695, possibly into a French-English family in England, and died in Hereford in December 1768. He was engaged from 1717 to Lady Day 1719 in the service of James Brydges, Earl of Carnarvon and Duke of Chandos where he played in Handel's band and met early founders of the Freemasons.

In 1730 he married Ann Hampshire and settled in Covent Garden. In collaboration with the recorder maker Thomas Stanesby (1692–1754), he tried to promote the recorder, which at that time was in danger of disappearing in favour of the transverse flute.

He was Master of Ceremonies at The Hotwells in Bristol in 1752 and lived in Bath. He died in Hereford, where his son lived, and was buried on 27 December 1768 in St Owen's graveyard.

== Works ==
Four books of six sonatas each were published by John Walsh in London.

- 6 Sonatas for flute and basso continuo op.1 (1718)
- 6 Sonatas for flute and basso continuo op.2 (1720)
- 6 Sonatas for bassoon or cello and basso continuo op.3 (1735)
- 6 Sonatas for transverse flute and basso continuo also as op.3 (1740s)
