= Louis Saladin =

French composer

Louis Saladin was a seventeenth-century composer from Provence, France. He wrote in the Baroque style and is most remembered for his association with the Provençal Jewish community and the commissioned works he composed for that community.

His Canticum hebraicum, rediscovered by the Israeli musicologist Israel Adler, is his most remembered work today. It celebrates the circumcision of a baby boy and might have been written to appeal to the Gentiles present at the Jewish ritual.
