= Élisabeth de Haulteterre =

French composer and violinist

Élisabeth de Haulteterre (Hotteterre) (c. 1720?–after 1768) (fl. 1737–1768) was a French composer and violinist. Despite the similarity of the name, she did not come from La Couture, the home of the Hotteterre family including Jacques Martin Hotteterre, and is probably not related. She should also not be confused with Élisabeth de Haulteterre (1738–1820) a French musician of the same name.

She was known as a concert violinist, playing Jean-Marie Leclair's sonatas at the Concert Spirituel in 1737. Her married name was Levésque.

== Early 18th Century French Music - A Woman's Role ==
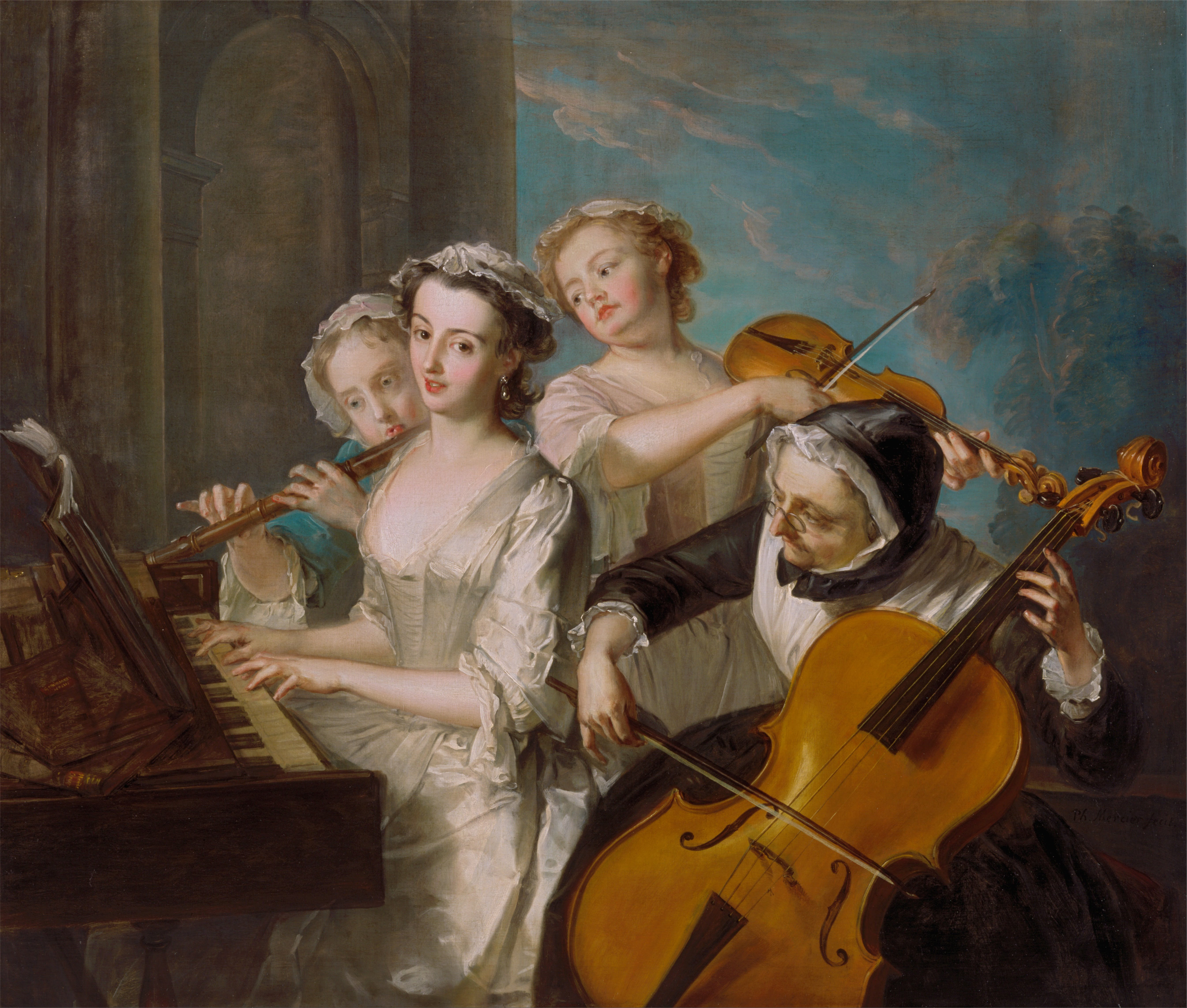
Women playing instruments

Women were generally trained in opera in Paris during the Early 18th Century. Ballet and opera were on the rise during this period of time in Paris. Additionally, the Baroque era attracted patrons because of its elaborate and lush arrangements as well as the presence of the organ. During the 17th and 18th centuries, there was an increase in public secular music making as well as opportunities for women not tied directly to the church. Women began to appear in public performances often subbing for males on organ and harpsichord if they possessed the lineage and privilege to do so. Women were often seen as pianists, vocalists, harpists, organists, and harpsichord players. It would have been rare for a woman composer to publicly display violin performance such as Élisabeth de Haulteterre.

== Participation in Le Concert Spirituel ==
Le Concert Spirituel was the most prolific concert giving society in 18th century Paris founded by Anne Danican Philidor. Le Concert Spirituel was founded in 1725 and served as instrumental and choral performances at Salle de Swisses of the Tulieres Palace during lent and on other religious holidays when the opera was closed. Women were permitted to compose as both solo singers and solo instrumentalists, which is where Élisabeth de Haulteterre would find ability to actively compose, perform, and participate. Elisabeth was one of the few ambitious women to play violin professionally, and the most prominent during the first half of the eighteenth century at this concert. She was described as playing "with all imaginable intelligence, vivacity, and precision."

== Marriage to Pierre Charles Levesque ==
Élisabeth de Haulteterre was married to Pierre Charles Levesque who was a painter in 18th century France. He is famous for the classic painting History of Russia which shaped the public perception of Russia from a Western perspective. It is speculated that Élisabeth de Haulteterre published under her husbands last name but cannot be confirmed.

== Works ==
Her concertos and sonatas for violin have been lost. Selected work include:

- Requil de chansons for harpsichord
- Deuxieme recueil d'airs choisis, with accompaniments for the harp
- Premier livre de sonates for violin and continuo, 1740
