= Pietro degli Antonii =

Italian musician and Kapellmeister

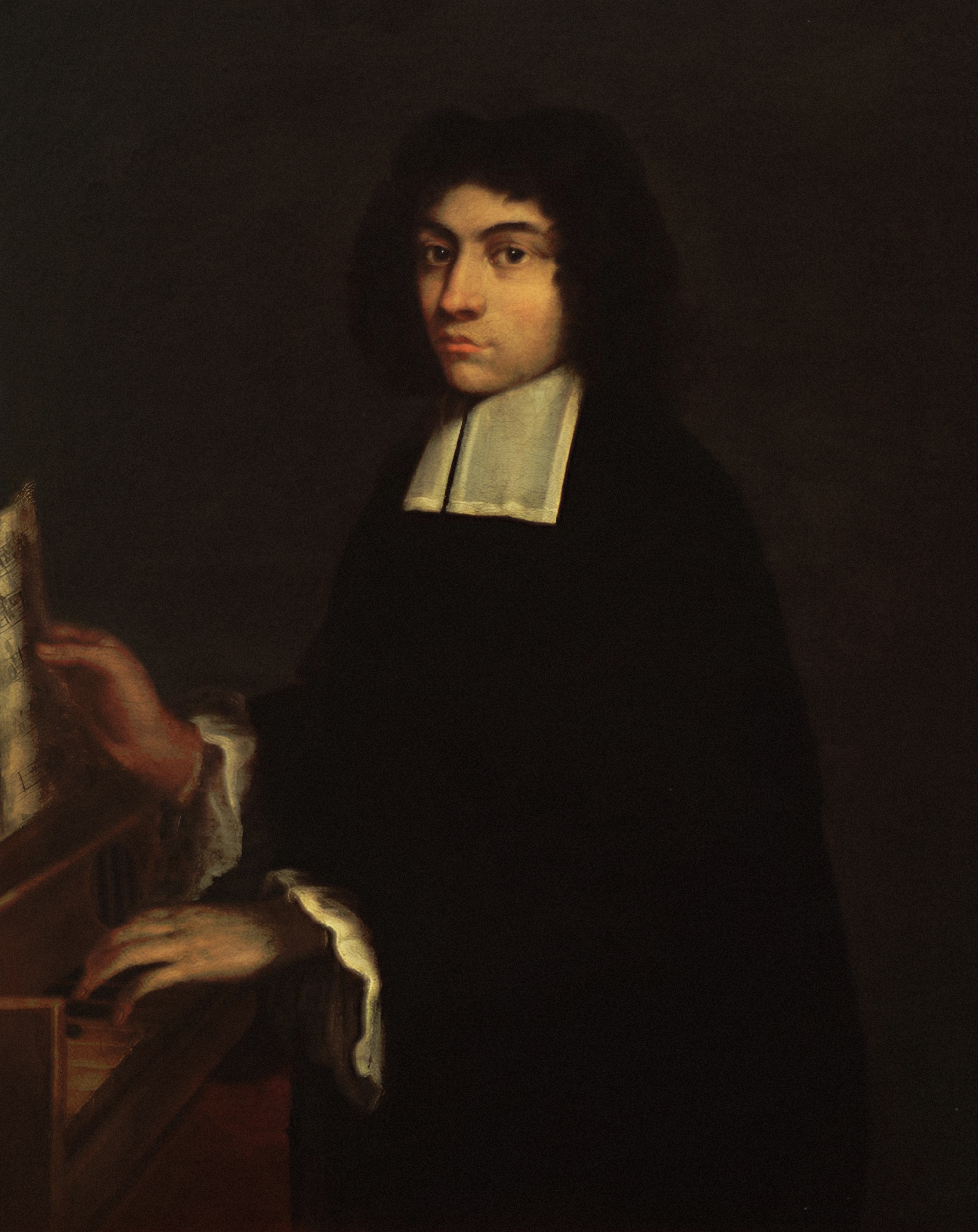
Portrait of Pietro Degli Antoni - Bolognese painter of the mid-17th century, oil on canvas

Pietro degli Antonii (16 May 1639 – 25 September 1720) was an Italian composer.

== Life ==
Pietro degli Antonii, son of a trombonist, spent his entire life in Bologna where he was born and died. Around 1670, he became a member of the prestigious Accademia Filarmonica, of which he was elected chairman several times. He was also director of music in three important churches in his home town. With his brother, Giovanni Battista degli Antonii (1636-1698), and Giovanni Battista Vitali, he is regarded as an important representative of the Bolognese School after Maurizio Cazzati.

His main merit is his contribution to the development of the sonata da chiesa and the sonata da camera. His preference for slow, melodious movements based on singing is particularly noteworthy. Thus a trio sonata published in 1680 bears the movement tempo designations: Largo - Lento - Grave - Lento - Grave. In addition to instrumental compositions, he created numerous cantatas.

He married soprano Maria Maddalena Musi in 1703.

== Compositions ==
=== Published music ===
- Arie, Gighe, Balletti, Correnti, Allemande, e Sarabande a violino, e violone, ò spinetta con il secondo violino à beneplacito... Opera Prima (Bologna, 1670)
- Messa e Salmi Concertati à trè voci, due canti, e basso... Opera Seconda (Bologna, 1670)
- Balletti, Correnti, et Arie diverse à violino, e violone per camera, et anco per suonare nella spinetta, et altri istromenti... Opera Terza (Bologna, 1671)
- Sonate a violino solo con il basso continuo per l'organo... Opera Quarta (Bologna, 1676).
- Suonate a violino solo col basso continuo per l'organo... Opera Quinta (Bologna, 1686)
- Cantate da camera a voce sola... Opera Sesta (Bologna, 1690)
- Motetti sacri a voce sola con violini, viole, e violoncello obbligato... Opera Settima (Bologna, 1696)
- Messe Concertate à 3. voci, due canti, e basso... Opera Ottava (Bologna, 1697)

=== Oratori ===
- Il San Rocco (poem by Giovanni Luigi Piccinardi. Bologna, Oratorio dell'Archiconfraternità de' SS. Sebastiano e Rocco, 1666)
- Priggionia e morte di S. Rocco (poem by Filippo Ottani. Bologna, Oratorio dell'Archiconfraternità de' SS. Sebastiano e Rocco, 1673)
- Il Nabal overo L'ingratitudine punita (Bologna, Palazzo Pepoli, 5 aprile 1682)
- L'innocenza depressa (Modena, Oratorio di S. Carlo, 1686)

=== Stage music ===
- Prologo ed intermedj... per L'Inganno fortunato (poem by Giuseppe Balbi. Bologna, Teatro Zoppio, 1671)
- Atide (dramma per musica di Tomaso Stanzani. Bologna, Teatro Formagliari, 23 giugno 1679. Composto in collaborazione con Giuseppe Felice Tosi e Giacomo Antonio Perti)

== Discography ==
- Sonaten für Violine & B. c. Op. 4 Nr. 1–12 Ensemble Il Coro d'Arcadia Label, Brilliant Classics, 2014
