= Esther Elizabeth Velkiers =

Swiss singer, musician, and composer (1640 – after 1685)

Esther Elizabeth Velkiers (1640 – after 1685) was a Swiss singer, musician and composer.

== Biography ==
Esther Velkiers was born in Geneva, then in the independent Republic of Geneva. She was nearly blind from an accident with an oven when she was a baby, and was taught letters by her father using wooden blocks.

She learned Latin, German, Italian and French, and then studied philosophy, mathematics, theology and science. She also studied music and became a singer and harpsichordist. She was noted as a composer, but none of her compositions survive. Velkiers was known as a musician, but also for her philosophy, language, science and theology.
