= Damian Stachowicz =

Damian Stachowicz (June 23, 1658 in Sokołów Małopolski – November 27, 1699 in Łowicz) was a Polish composer. His baptismal name was Jan (Joannes). At the age of 17 he entered the monastic order of the Piarists in Rzeszów and took on the name Damian of the Most Holy Trinity (Damianus à SS. Trinitate). On 9 June 1675 he received the religious habit, and as early as 6 August of the same year he arrived at Podolinec, where he stayed until 1677 teaching the classes in poetry and rhetoric, as well as performing musical tasks. Since 1678 he had resided in the monastery in Prievidza, and studied philosophy and theology. Most probably he was still occupied with music (which we can surmise on the basis of a large number of compositions mentioned in the music inventory of that place). In the years 1681–1690 he worked in Warsaw where on 21 December 1685 he was ordained to the priesthood. We may also find more detailed information about his musical responsibilities (“mgr chori et Musices”), which included education of the youth. Since 1691 Stachowicz had dwelled in Łowicz and his duties were to conduct the choir, to teach rhetoric and theology, to head the school (at least since 1696) and finally to be the deputy rector of the college (since 1698). Only in the years 1694–1696 he was sent to Góra Kalwaria where he taught the classes of philosophy and poetry. Father Damian Stachowicz died in Łowicz on 27 November 1699.

== Works ==
Stachowicz works that have survived include the genres of church music for both liturgical and non-liturgical texts:

1. Ave Virgo, for CA, 2 vn, b.c.
2. Veni Consolator, for C, clno, b.c.
3. Assumpta est, for ATTB, b.c. (incomplete)
4. Beata nobis gaudia, for CATB, 2 vni, 2 clni (missing), b.c.
5. Beatus vir, for CATB, 2 vn, b.c.
6. Conitebor, for CATB, 2 vn, b.c.
7. Conitebor, for CCATB, 2 vn, 2 clni, b.c. (incomplete – only b.c. part and fragments of clno II part preserved)
8. Dixit Dominus, for CCATB, 2 vn, 2 clni, b.c.
9. Laudate pueri, for CCATB, 2 vn, 2 clni, b.c.
10. Laetatus sum, for CATB, 2 vn, 2 clni, b.c.
11. Lauda Jerusalem, for CATB, 2 vn, 2 clni, b.c.
12. Litaniae de B.M.V., for CATB, 2 vn, 2 clni, b.c.
13. Missa Requiem, for CCATB, 2 vn, 2 clni, b.c.

Many other works that have not survived are mentioned in the inventories of music materials.

== Recordings ==
- D. Stachowicz, Opera Omnia : Missa Requiem. Ave Virgo mundi spes. Veni Consolator. Litaniae De Beata Maria Virgine Beata nobis guardia. Psalmi ad Vesperas Ed. PRO MUSICA CAMERATA 2003
- Stachowicz : Missa pro defunctis, with Maciej Wronowicz : Exportatio defuncti, chant – on collection Castrum Doloris Bornus Consort 2013 (Dux)
