= David Sacerdote =

Italian composer

David Sacerdote (c. 1550–1625) was an Italian composer and banker. He is the earliest known Jewish composer of polyphonic music of which any has survived.

Details of his life are sketchy. He was born in Rovere, and is known to have lived in Casale, Acqui, and Cortemilia. He worked in banking throughout his life, holding concessions as a moneylender. He appears to have been an amateur musician in his youth, as he lived for half a century after the 1575 publication of his only known work, and no trace of musical activity appears during this time.

Only one part-book of his one known collection of madrigals, Il primo libro di madrigali a sei voci (First book of madrigals for six voices), has survived. The collection is dedicated to his patron, Marquis Alfonso del Vasto, a member of the Gonzaga family, and is dated 25 January 1575. Published in Venice, the book includes a sonnet praising Sacerdote, by Cavaliere Nuvolone, a member of a Mantuan academy founded by Cesare Gonzaga.

As only one part (the quinto) survives, it is impossible to assess fully the stylistic nature of his work, but he appears to have been a competent composer working in the circle of the Mantuan court, where the contributions of Jewish musicians were appreciated, at least during the last third of the 16th century. Sacerdote's madrigals include settings of Petrarch and Ariosto.

The surviving fragment of his work is in the British Museum.
