= Jean-Baptiste Quentin =

French violinist and composer

Jean-Baptiste Quentin, the young (born before 1690 – died ca. 1742) was a French violinist and composer of the Baroque era.

== Biography ==
Born in Paris, Jean-Baptiste Quentin, brother of Bertin Quentin, became a violinist at the Académie royale de musique in 1718. From 1738 he played the violin fifth (52.5 cm high viola) in the "Grand Chœur". His qualities as a violinist were mentioned several times in the Mercure de France, but also in Germany by Friedrich Wilhelm Marpurg who described favorably the qualities of his playing.

His work as a composer is quite important and is mainly devoted to the chamber music for violins with basso continuo. His Op.17 is composed of trio sonata or quartet sonatas, which are no longer purely solistic and are like many other examples from the era of trios or quartets, playable by a string orchestra. In his violin sonatas he indicates bow strokes and signs of dynamics.

== Works (selection) ==
- Opp. 1–3, 3 Books each composed of 10 sonatas for violin and Basso continuo (Paris, 1724–1728)
- Opp. 4–7, 4 Books of 6 trio sonatas for 2 violins or 2 flutes and B.c. (Paris, 1729)
- Opp. 8–11, 4 Books of 5 trio sonatas and 1 Sonate en quatre parties each (Paris, after 1729)
- Op. 12, 1 concerto for violin and 5 trio sonatas (Paris, after 1729)
- Op. 13, 6 trio sonatas for 2 violins or 2 flutes and B.c. (Paris, after 1729)
- Op. 14, 6 sonatas for violin and B.c. (Paris, after 1729)
- Op. 15, 5 trio sonatas and 1 Sonate en quatre parties (Paris, after 1729)
- Op. 16, 6 trio sonatas for 2 violins or 2 flutes and B.c. (Paris, after 1729)
- Op. 17, Sonate (1) et Simphonies (2) en trio et à 4 parties (Paris, ca. 1740)
- Opp. 18 & 19, 2 Books of 6 trio sonatas for 2 violins or 2 flutes and B.c. (Paris, ca. 1740)

== Discography ==
- French Baroque Concertos by the Musica Antiqua Köln, conducted by Reinhard Goebel, concertos by Michel Blavet, Joseph Bodin de Boismortier, Pierre-Gabriel Buffardin, Michel Corrette and Jean-Baptiste Quentin
