= David Funck =

David Funck (1648 – 1699?) was a Czech or German music composer, educator, and performer on several instruments, including violas da gamba, violin, guitar, and clavichord. In addition to his work in the field of music, in both ecclesiastic and secular positions, Funck also served as secretary to Princess Eleonore of Schleswig-Holstein.

== Life ==
David Funck was born at Sankt Joachimsthal in 1648. While the town is situated in a predominantly German part of the modern Czech Republic, Funck considered himself Czech, and referred to himself as "Bohemian". He was accepted into the University of Jena, where he studied music, poetry, and law. After university, he was employed by Princess Eleonore as her personal secretary. Scandals seem to have erupted wherever Funck was employed after he left the royal family's employ.

Funck was then hired as music composition instructor and choirmaster at Reichenbach. His next position was as organist in the village of Wunsiedel in modern-day Bavaria. In 1694, he accepted yet another organist/educator position in Ilmenau in Thuringia. Accusations of sodomy in 1699 forced him to flee with the clothes on his back. His frozen body was discovered later that winter (1699 or 1700) on the road to Arnstadt.

== Works ==
Funck was highly regarded by contemporaries for his performance abilities on violin and keyboards, though he is best-remembered for his compositions for consort of violas da gamba in a collection entitled Stricturæ Viola-di Gambicæ. He also composed a Passion which was admired by contemporaries but is now lost.
