= Pedro de Araújo =

Portuguese organist and composer

Pedro de Araújo (c. 1640 – 1705; possibly 1610 – 1684), was a Portuguese organist and composer who worked with the Roman Catholic Archdiocese of Braga, northern Portugal. He was singing master at the Conciliar Seminary of St. Peter and St. Paul in Braga between 1663 and 1668, and second organist at Braga Cathedral until 1665. Like Juan Cabanilles, he was one of the last representatives of the traditional concentrated Iberian style.

== Organ works ==
1. Meio Registo terçado de três tiples
2. Fantasia de 1º Tom ou Fantasia de 2º Tom
3. Fantasia de 4º Tom
4. Fantasia de 8º Tom
5. Batalha de 6º Tom
6. Consonâncias de 1º Tom ou Obra de 1º Tom
7. Obra de Passo Solto de 7º Tom
8. Obra de 2º Tom
9. Obra de 6º Tom
10. Obra de 8º Tom
11. Tento de 2º Tom
12. Obra de 1° Tom por B Quadro ou Obra de 2° Tom por B Quadro
13. Obra de 1° Tom sobre a Salve Regina

== Discography ==
- Castro, Ana Mafalda (1995), Música Portuguesa para Tecla: Séculos XVI e XVII, Emi-Valentim de Carvalho Música. Clássicos Portugueses 4, Jornal Público.
- Doderer, Gerhard (1994), Os Órgãos da Sé Catedral de Braga, Numérica, NUM 1028.
- Hora, Joaquim Simões da (1994), Lusitana Musica, Volume I, Órgãos Históricos Portugueses: Évora, Porto, Emi-Valentim de Carvalho Música.
- Hora, Joaquim Simões da (1994), Lusitana Musica, Volume III, Órgãos Históricos Portugueses: Faro, Óbidos, Emi-Valentim de Carvalho Música.
- Hora, Joaquim Simões da (1994), Batalhas & Meios Registos, MoviePlay. Fundação Calouste Gulbenkian e Lisboa 94: Capital Europeia da Cultura.
- Janeiro, João Paulo (2000), A influência da Música Italiana para Tecla: Na 2ª Metade do Século XVII e 1ª Metade do Século XVIII, MoviePlay Classics.
- Vaz, João (2011), El Organista “Portogoes”: Livro de obras de Orgão juntas pella coriosidade do P. P. Fr. Roque da Cõceição, Anno de 1695: Zaragoza, Institucion Fernando El Católico.

== Bibliography ==
- Alvarenga João Pedro (2007), Obras de Referência da Cultura Portuguesa, Centro Nacional de Cultura.
- Apel, Willi (1972), The History of Keyboard Music To 1700, Bloomington/London, Indiana University Press. [pp. 775–776].
- Bernardes, J. M. R. e Bernardes, I. R. S. (2003), Uma Discografia de Cds da Composição Musical em Portugal: Do Século XIII aos Nossos Dias, INCM, pp. 56–60.
- Cabral, Luís (1982), “Catálogo do Fundo de Manuscritos Musicais”, Biblioteca Portucalensis, 2ª Série, n.º 1, Porto, pp. 44–48.
- Carneiro, Álvaro (1959), A Música em Braga, Separata de Theologia, pp. 54–55.
- Doderer, Gerhard (1974), Obras Selectas para Órgão: Ms. 964 da Biblioteca Pública de Braga, Portugaliae Musica, vol. XXV, Fundação Calouste Gulbenkian.
- Doderer, Gerhard (2001), “Araújo, Pedro de”, The New Grove Dictionary of Music and Musicians, vol. 1, p. 840, Segunda Edição, Londres, Macmillan.
- Kastner, Macario Santiago (1946), “Três libros desconocidos con música orgánica en las Bibliotecas de Oporto y Braga”, Anuário Musical, vol. I, Barcelona, pp. 143–151.
- Kastner, Macario Santiago (1947), Carlos Seixas. Coimbra: Coimbra Editora. [pp. 35–46].
- Kastner, Macario Santiago (1950), Cravistas Portugueses, Vol. II, pp. 2–5, Edition Schott.
- Kastner, Macario Santiago (1973), “Orígenes y evolución del tiento para instrumentos de tecla”, Anuário Musical, Barcelona, vol. XXVIII, pp. 11–86. [Ver: pp. 78–79]
- Kastner, Macario Santiago (1978), Pedro de Araújo: Cinco Peças para Instrumentos de Tecla, Edição Valentim de Carvalho, CI SARL.
- Kastner, Macario Santiago (1979), Três Compositores Lusitanos: António Carreira, Rodrigues Coelho, Pedro de Araújo, Fundação Calouste Gulbenkian, pp. 117–144.
- Nery, Rui Vieira (1994), Batalhas & Meios Registos: Música ibérica para órgão do séc. XVII, Joaquim Simões da Hora, Movieplay, Lisboa, 1994.
- Speer, Klaus (1967), Fr. Roque da Conceição: Livro de Obras de Órgão, Portugaliae Musica, vol. XI, Fundação Calouste Gulbenkian.
- Speer, Klaus (1980), “Araújo, Pedro de”, The New Grove Dictionary of Music and Musicians, vol. 1, p. 544, Londres, Macmillan.
