= Stanisław Sylwester Szarzyński =

Polish composer

Stanisław Sylwester Szarzyński (fl. 1692–1713) was a Polish composer.

Szarzyński was a Cistercian monk; virtually nothing else is known of his life. He may have been involved with the choir of the Collegiate Church at Lowicz, where many of his compositions were preserved. His works are dated from 1692 to 1713, and the level of technical competence displayed in his works indicates that he must have had significant formal training.

All but one of his surviving works are sacred in nature. He wrote solo motets for voice, violin, and continuo, which are in stile concertato. He also wrote a number of choral works. His compositions include a five-part mass and a four-part completeorium. Many of his pieces interpolate melodies from popular religious tunes. His lone surviving nonreligious work is a sonata for two violins and continuo.
