= Orazio Michi =

Italian composer and harpist

Orazio Michi "dell'Arpa" (also Mihi; Alife, Campania, 1594 – Rome, 26 October 1641) was an Italian composer, and, as his nickname "of the harp" suggests, harpist.

== Works, editions and recordings ==
- 3 instrumental pieces on The Harp of Luduvico I diletti di mundo. Quel signor. Su duro tronco. Andrew Lawrence-King CDH55264 Helios
- Piangete, afflitti lumi Jaroussky, Rial, Pluhar & L´Arpeggiata.
- Ninna nanna al bambino Gesù Jaroussky, Rial, Pluhar & L´Arpeggiata.
