= Jean Cappus =

French composer

Jean (Baptiste) Cappus (Dijon, 6 October 1689 – 10 March 1751) was a French composer. The second name ‘Baptiste’ is attested only on his 1730 book of viol music.

== Biography ==
Youngest son of François Cappus, organist, singer and composer in Dijon, Province of Burgundy, and Anne Hervelin, Jean Cappus married Marie-Michelle Dotée on 17 October 1729. The couple had two sons, Louis and Nicolas.

== Career ==
In 1734 Jean Cappus become director of the theatre in Dijon. He was ‘Pensionnaire de la Ville de Dijon’ (resident (artist) for the city of Dijon), ‘Maître Ordinaire de la Ville de Dijon’ (Ordinary Master for the city of Dijon), and musician for Louis Henri, Duke of Bourbon, prince of Condé (dit Louis IV, ou M. le Duc), governor of Burgundy (1710-1740). He also worked regularly as a composer for the Jesuit College in Dijon for whom he composed music for plays; only the text has survived, not the music. Jean Cappus rented the Hôtel de Barres in Dijon in 1734, which nowadays is the square Carrelet de Loizy. Here he directed many productions up to his death. An account of his conducting was given by Lantin Damerey in 1838 : ‘Rameau played the harpsichord, and Cappus directed the orchestra with such vanity equal to a general of the army at the head of his troops. His wife took over when it was needed’.

== Works ==
- Etrennes de musique contenant une méthode courte et facile pour apprendre cet art en très peu de temps, Paris, Lecler, Boivin, l'auteur, 1730. (Facsimile edition: Minkoff, 1989. Modern transcription Indiana University)
- Premier livre de pièces de viole et la basse continue, Paris, Boivin, Le Clerc, 1730. RISM 990008685 RISM A/1 C 927. (Facsimile on Gallica)
- Premier recueil d'airs sérieux et à boire, Paris, Boivin, 1732 (lost)
- Second recueil d'airs sérieux et à boire, Paris, Boivin, 1732 (lost)
- Sémélé, ou La Naissance de Bacchus. Cantate à voix seule avec simphonie, Paris, Boivin, Le Clerc, Cappus, 1732. RISM 990008683 RISM A/1 C 925 (Facsimile on Gallica)
- Second livre de pièces de viole, Paris, Boivin, 1733 (lost)
- Air Ah! J'entends que la foudre gronde, "Mercure de France", [Paris], s.n., December 1734, vol. II, p. 2906 and following folio. RISM 990008684 RISM A/I C 926. (Facsimile on Gallica)

For further vocal and instrumental compositions attributable to (Jean) Cappus, some published in collections, many lost, see J. Dunford and Y. Beuvard, Jean (-Baptiste) Cappus – the forgotten violist: an inventory of his life and works, The Viola da Gamba Society Journal, vol. 11 (2017), pp. 49–52.
