= Mrs Philarmonica =

Mrs Philarmonica (fl. 1715) was the pseudonym of an early-18th century English female, Baroque composer. She published a collection of 6 trio sonatas for two violins with violoncello obbligato and continuo, as well as a set of 6 divertimenti for 2 violins, violoncello or harpsichord (or organ) with Richard Meares in London about 1715. Her actual identity is unknown.

== Works ==
Selected works include:

- Sonatas for two violins with violoncello obbligato and continuo (violone, harpsichord or organ) Vol I. Edited by Barbara Jackson (Clar-Nan Editions, 2002).
- Sonatas for two violins with violoncello obbligato and continuo (violone, harpsichord or organ) Vol II. Edited by Barbara Jackson (Clar-Nan Editions, 2003).
- Sonatas parte seconda: Divertimenti da Camera for 2 violins, violoncello or harpsichord (or organ). Vol. III. Edited by Barbara Jackson (Clar-Nan Editions, 2004).
- Sonatas parte seconda: Divertimenti da Camera for 2 violins, violoncello or harpsichord (or organ). Vol IV. Edited by Barbara Jackson (Clar-Nan Editions Clar-Nan Editions, 2005).
- Trio Sonata in A for 2 violins, violoncello, harpsichord (Louisville, KY: Editions Ars Femina, 2000) (Check worldcat.org for location or borrow from University of Michigan library.)
