= Alexander Maasmann =

Alexander Maasmann was a Harpsichordist, Organist and composer active in Eastern Prussia during the baroque era. Almost nothing is known about his life, not even his date of birth or death. In 1715, his suite in a minor was published by Hare & Walsh in London titled:"A Compleat Suite of Lessons for the Harpsicord, as Overture, Allemand, Saraband, Corant, Gavott, Chacoon, Jigg & Minuett." It is certain that he did not do much travelling, however he was known throughout England and France. Around the year 1700 he was the Organist at the Königsberg Cathedral on the Island of Kneiphof.

== Name ==
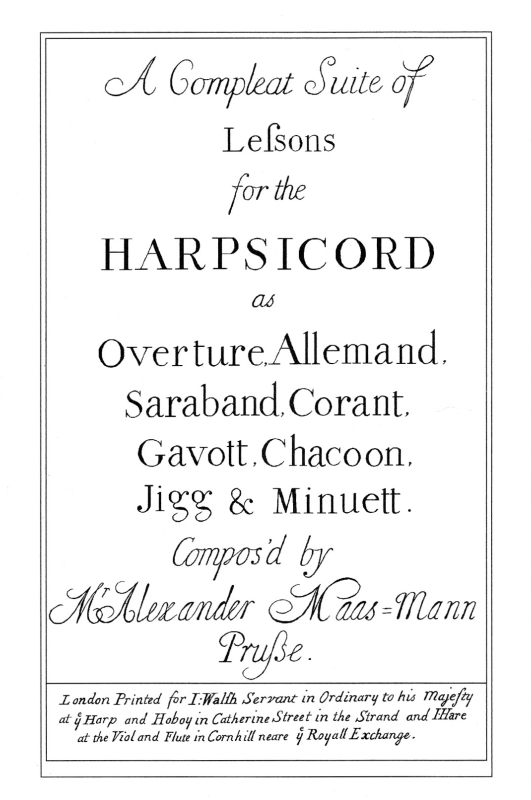
The title page of the original 1715 printing, showing his name spelled with an = sign.

In the original print his name is spelt as "Mr. Alexander Maas=mann Prusse", this could have meant that he was "Mr. Alexander Maas, man from Prussia". Therefore, his real name might have been Alexander Maas.

== Works ==
His suite in a minor is his only known work. It shows an amateur, yet confident style. The suite follows this order:

1. Overture Largo - Allegro - Grave

2. Allmanda

3. Sarabanda

4. Corrente Allegro

5. Gavotta Presto

6. Ciaccona Andante

7. Giga Vivace

8. Minuet

The suite was recorded by renowned harpsichordist Fernando de Luca.
