= Tomasz Szadek =

Polish composer, singer and cleric

Tomasz Szadek (1550 – 1612) was a Polish composer, singer, and cleric of the late Renaissance. He was a representative of the late style of the Franco-Flemish school in Poland.

Gustave Reese gives a birthdate of 1550, but no location. Little is known about his activities prior to his appointment to the royal chapel in Kraków, other than that he had received a baccalaureate degree sometime before his arrival in 1569. He became a curate at the cathedral in the early 1570s, where he also heard confessions. He joined the Capella Rorantistarum, a group of male singers for the Sigismund Chapel of the Wawel Cathedral, and remained with them until 1578. Towards the end of his life, the association of cathedral vicars put him on trial, accusing him of poor performance in administrative duties and having an immoral lifestyle.

Szadek's surviving music was all written for the male voices of his choir. It is in a style equivalent to the work of the late Franco-Flemish school. Of his writing Reese observes that he "shows talent for melodic line, but his polyphonic technique is unresourceful." Much of his writing is homophonic. One of his two masses is based on a chanson by Thomas Crecquillon – Pis ne me peult venir, and is of the parody type. The other is also a parody mass, and based on a Christmas carol.

== Works ==
- Two masses:
  - Officium Dies est laetitiae (1578)
  - Officium In melodiam motetae Pisneme (1580)
- Three antiphons:
  - Introit Vultum tuum
  - gradual Haec dies
  - communion Pascha nostra
