= Wolff Jakob Lauffensteiner =

German composer and lutenist (1676–1754)

Wolff Jakob Lauffensteiner (1676–1754) was a lutenist active in the Bavarian court where he spent much of his career in service to the Elector of Bavaria in Munich. Some of Lauffensteiner's compositions for lute have survived.

Lauffensteiner was born in Steyr. Only his baptism date is known - 28 April 1676. He died in Munich on 26 March 1754. His father, who bore the same name, was the towerkeeper in Steyr.

About 1709 he had obtained a position of a lutenist in Graz, and from 1712 he was in the service of the Bavarian court. In 1715 he entered the private service of the Duke Ferdinand. In 1739, on the duke's death, he was granted a pension. He was later appointed a chamber counsellor (Hofkammerrat) by the Duke Clemens August, Archbishop of Cologne, for his services to the electoral House of Bavaria.

Lauffensteiner's extant works for both solo lute and chamber ensembles typically take the forms of suite or partita. His music is generally highly idiomatic for the lute, in the German style (i.e. uniting traditional French forms, textures and ornaments with Italianate cantabile melody over a basso continuo line). In total over 100 movements survive.

Lauffensteiner is seen as a stylistic precursor to Silvius Leopold Weiss, to whom his music is frequently misattributed in manuscript sources – illustrative of its high quality in the estimation of his contemporaries.

== Works ==
=== Ensemble ===
- Concerto in g, lute, 2 vn, vc, B-Br II 4089 (also for solo lute attrib. S.L. Weiss, lost; see BrookB);
- Concerti in F, lute, vn/fl, b, US-NYp Harrach 11;
- 2 concerti, in B and F, P-Wu Rps.mus.37 (lute pt only);
- Concerto in, F, lute, vn, b, A-Su M.III.25 (lute pt only)
- Sonata in A, 2 lutes (or lute, vn/va da gamba, vc), D-As Tonk.2°, inc., ed. H. Neeman (Berlin, 1927)
- 12 Symphonie da camera, 1750, lost [mentioned in Munich court document]

=== Solo lute ===
- Suites: 4 suites, D, b, F, A, A-GÖ (variants of nos.1 and 2, KR L77), ed. in MAM, xxx (1973); suite, c, CZ-Bm A.13.269, ed. in MAM, xxx (1973); suite, B, D-Mbs 5362 (inc.), GB-HAdolmetsch II.B.2 (attrib. Weiss), US-NYp Harrach 14; 2 suites, D, B, GB-HAdolmetsch II.B.2; suite, D, Harrach family's private collection, Vienna; suite, B, GB-Lspencer, ed. P. Lay and R. Spencer (Harrow, 1987)
- Suite movements: 2 menuets, bourée, D-Mbs 5362; 2 menuets, gay, Mbs 5362; sarabande, E, Mbs 5362; gigue, courante, menuet, A, GB-HAdolmetsch II.B.2; 3 preludes, d, A-Wgm 7763/92, 2 ed. in MAM, xxx (1973); menuet, d, D-KNu 1.P.56, ed in F. Giesbert, Lautenbuch ‘Livre pour le lut’ Köln, 18. Jahrhundert (Mainz, 1965)

doubtful

- Bourée, B, lute, CZ-POm (attrib. Weiss, A-Su M.III.25); Sonata à 5, 2 vn, 2 va, ‘basso viola’, lost (listed in 1710 catalogue; see Flotzinger)

== Bibliography ==
- E.G. Baron: Historisch-theoretische und practische Untersuchung des Instruments der Lauten (Nuremberg, 1727/R; Eng. trans., 1976)
- H. Federhofer: ‘Die Grazer Stadtpfarrmatrikeln als musikgeschichtliche Quelle’, Zeitschrift des Historischen Vereines für Steiermark, xlv (1954), 158–68, esp. 163
- R. Flotzinger: ‘Rochus Berhandtzky und Wolff Jacob Lauffensteiner. Zum Leben und Schaffen zweier Lautenisten in kurbayerischen Diensten’, SMw, xxvii (1966), 200–40

== Recordings ==
- Suite for Lute in D major played by Joachim Held (Hänssler Classic 8232)
- Sonata for Two Lutes in A major both lute parts played by John Schneiderman (Vgo Recordings VG1008)
- Prelude and Allemande played by William Bower (1980 MOVE Records MD3-57 released 2022)
