= Girolamo Bartei =

Italian composer

Girolamo Bartei (c. 1570 – c. 1618) was an Italian composer of sacred music in the early Baroque.

He was general of the Augustin order of monks at Rome in the beginning of the seventeenth century. From two somewhat obscure passages in Giuseppe Baini's 'Memorie' we gather that he published at Rome in 1618 some masses for eight voices, some ricercari for two voices, and two books of concerti for two voices. To these François-Joseph Fétis adds some 'Responsoria' for four equal voices, printed at Venice in 1607.
