= Matthäus Waissel =

German musician (c. 1540–1602)

Matthäus Waissel (c. 1540–1602) was a German lutenist, editor of music, and writer. Waissel was from 1573 headmaster of a school at Schippenbeil near Königsberg; he published in that year a volume of lute arrangements of vocal pieces, and in 1592 he issued a collection of German dances for lute, which signaled the decline of German lute tablature as it yielded prominence to the so-called French system. Waissel's output comprises three books of solo lute music in all, and one collection of duets. It is unlikely though that any of the pieces in these collections are his own compositions. Waissel's chief importance arguably lies in his expansion of the passamezzo/saltarello pairing into full suites that in form, if not title, comprise some of the earliest true dance suites.

Besides his publications of lute tabulatures, he also published a collection of biblical tales in 1596, and a chronicle of East Prussia in 1599.

His son, also named Matthäus, became a musician, too. In 1598 he was instrumentalist at Riga, and from 1616 to 1619 he was a member of the Königsberg court chapel.

== Works ==
- 1573, Tabulatura continens insignes et selectissimas quaque Cantiones … testudini adaptas, Frankfurt an der Oder (urn:nbn:de:bvb:12-bsb00033916-5)
- 1591, Tabulatura allerley kunstlicher Preambuln, ... Auff der Lauten zu schlagen ..., Frankfurt an der Oder
- 1592, Lautenbuch, darinn von der Tabulatur und Application der Lauten gründlicher und voller Unterricht ..., Frankfurt an der Oder
- 1592, Tabulatura Guter gemeiner Deudtscher Tentze, nicht allein auff einer Lauten in sonderheit, sondern auch auff zweyen Lauten, durch Quarten zusammen zuschlagen ..., Frankfurt an der Oder (Andreas Eichorn)
- 1596, Summa doctrinae sacrae
- 1599, Chronica Alter Preusscher Eifflendischer und Curlendischer Historien ... Aus alten geschriebenen Historien ordenlich verfasset und menniglich zu nutz in den Druck gegeben. Durch Matthaeum Waisselium (urn:nbn:de:bvb:12-bsb00017773-3)

== Recordings ==
- Jacob Heringman - Black Cow. Lute music by Valentin Bakfark and Matthäus Waissel 1999, Magnatune
- Konrad Ragossnig - European Lute Music from England, Italy, Spain, Germany etc. 2000, Deutsche Grammophon
