= Anthony Beck =

English composer

Anthony Beck (died January 1674) was an English composer of the Baroque period. He served as a lay clerk and later minor canon at the Norwich Cathedral.

== Biography ==
In 1639 Beck was appointed lay clerk of the Norwich Cathedral (NC). He was part of a group of composers active during the Reformation in England who were encouraged to compose church music due to the lack of a published collection of anthems and music for services. In 1663 he was appointed precentor and a minor canon at NC. As customary he rotated out of the post of precentor, and again served in that role in 1668.

As is common among composers of this period, most of the music written by Beck has not survived, or is in fragmentary form. However, two of his anthems survive in complete: Behold how good and joyful and Who can tell how oft he offendeth. The manuscript of the former anthem is held in the Rowe Music Library at King's College, Cambridge, and the latter anthem at the library of Peterhouse, Cambridge. According to Peter Aston and Tom Roast these anthems demonstrate that Beck was a "competent if unadventurous composer".

Beck died in early 1674, and was buried in Norwich on 29 January of that year.

== Bibliography ==
- Aston, Peter; Roast, Tom (1996). "Music in the Cathedral". In Atherton, Ian; Fernie, Eric; Harber-Bill, Christopher; Smith, Hassell (eds.). Norwich Cathedral: Church, City, and Diocese, 1096-1996. Hambledon Press. ISBN 978-1852851347.
- Le Huray, Peter (1967). Music and the Reformation in England 1549-1660. Herbert Jenkins Limited. ISBN 0257666613.
