= René Drouart de Bousset =

French Baroque composer and organist

René Drouard de Bousset (French pronunciation: [ʁəne dʁuaʁ də busɛ]; 12 December 1703 – 19 May 1760) was a French Baroque composer and organist. He was born in Paris on 12 December 1703.

He was the son of Jean-Baptiste Drouard de Bousset (d. 1725), minor nobility and maître de musique of the chapelle of the Louvre.

René was a pupil of Nicolas Bernier. In February 1739 Bousset was appointed organist at the parish church of St André-des-Arts, Paris, then simultaneously co-organist with Armand-Louis Couperin at Notre Dame de Paris and the church of Saint Merry from 1755 to 1760. He was a Jansenist and noted for a series of publications of cantatas on biblical subjects.

Bousset died on 19 May 1760.

== Works ==
The catalogue of Bousset's works can be found on the Philidor Portal. Available recordings are listed.

=== Airs sérieux et à boire ===
Philidor Catalogue	Musical Genre	Title	Key	Publication	Recordings
RdB 001	Air à boire	Lorsque l'amour eut embrasé mon coeur	B flat major	1725, Vingt et unième recueil d'airs nouveaux	
RdB 002	Air sérieux	Amour, de quelle douce ivresse	E major	1725, Vingt et unième recueil d'airs nouveaux	
RdB 003	Air à boire	Sur nos musettes	C major	1725, Vingt et unième recueil d'airs nouveaux	
RdB 004	Air sérieux	Cessez de célébrer le retour du printemps	D major	1731, Premier Recueil d'Airs Sérieux et à Boire	
RdB 005	Air à boire	Ah! quelle honte pour Grégoire	G minor	1731, Premier Recueil d'Airs Sérieux et à Boire	
RdB 006	Air sérieux	Cupidon l'autre jour, me vit dans la prairie	G major	1731, Premier Recueil d'Airs Sérieux et à Boire	
RdB 007	Air à boire	Liberté, don des Dieux	G major	1731, Premier Recueil d'Airs Sérieux et à Boire	
RdB 008	Air sérieux	Vous écoutez trop les chansons	C major	1731, Premier Recueil d'Airs Sérieux et à Boire	
RdB 009	Air sérieux	Vous dancez jeune bergère	C major	1731, Premier Recueil d'Airs Sérieux et à Boire	
RdB 010	Air sérieux	Depuis que mon fidel amour	C minor	1731, Premier Recueil d'Airs Sérieux et à Boire	
RdB 011	Air à boire	C'est en vain que Bacchus	C major	1731, Premier Recueil d'Airs Sérieux et à Boire	
RdB 012	Air à boire	Entre deux vins, entre deux belles	C major	1731, Premier Recueil d'Airs Sérieux et à Boire	
RdB 013	Air à boire	Redoutable vainqueur	D minor	1731, Premier Recueil d'Airs Sérieux et à Boire	
RdB 014	Air sérieux	Pourquoi détournez vous les yeux	C minor	1731, Premier Recueil d'Airs Sérieux et à Boire	
RdB 015	Air sérieux	Lorsque Tircis vient me dire	G major	1731, Premier Recueil d'Airs Sérieux et à Boire	
RdB 016	Air à boire	Si tu me vois le verre en main	G major	1731, Premier Recueil d'Airs Sérieux et à Boire	
RdB 017	Air sérieux	Ah que vos yeux, Iris	D major	1731, Premier Recueil d'Airs Sérieux et à Boire	
RdB 018	Air à boire	De surmonter l'amour	D major	1731, Premier Recueil d'Airs Sérieux et à Boire	
RdB 019	Air à boire	Lorsque l'on boit à mes amours	D minor	1731, Premier Recueil d'Airs Sérieux et à Boire	
RdB 020	Air à boire	Je sers une ingrate beauté	G major	1731, Premier Recueil d'Airs Sérieux et à Boire	
RdB 021	Air sérieux	Jeunes beautés ou brillent mille attraits	A minor	1731, Premier Recueil d'Airs Sérieux et à Boire	
RdB 022	Air sérieux	Dans ce beau vallon	G major	1731, Premier Recueil d'Airs Sérieux et à Boire	
RdB 023	Air sérieux	Eveillez-vous, il est temps	G major	1731, Premier Recueil d'Airs Sérieux et à Boire	
RdB 024	Air à boire	Que ma Climène réponde à mes soupirs	F major	1731, Premier Recueil d'Airs Sérieux et à Boire	
RdB 025	Air sérieux	Tendres oiseaux dont le ramage	A major	1731, Second Recueil d'Airs Sérieux et à Boire	
RdB 026	Air à boire	L'Amour est souvent dangeureux	A minor	1731, Second Recueil d'Airs Sérieux et à Boire	
RdB 027	Air à boire	Je ne connais ni Paphos ni Cynthère	D minor	1731, Second Recueil d'Airs Sérieux et à Boire	
RdB 028	Air à boire	Bacchus par son nectar prétendait à la gloire	A major	1731, Second Recueil d'Airs Sérieux et à Boire	
RdB 029	Air sérieux	L'Amour enflammé de colère	D minor	1731, Second Recueil d'Airs Sérieux et à Boire	
RdB 030	Air à boire	Que me faites-vous entendre	D minor	1731, Second Recueil d'Airs Sérieux et à Boire	
RdB 031	Air sérieux	L'Amour dans ce riant bocage	F major	1731, Second Recueil d'Airs Sérieux et à Boire	
RdB 032	Air sérieux	Rions, chantons, et laissons paître nos moutons	G major	1731, Second Recueil d'Airs Sérieux et à Boire	
RdB 033	Air sérieux	Si nous voulons ne craindre pas	G major	1731, Second Recueil d'Airs Sérieux et à Boire	
RdB 034	Air à boire	Suivons Bacchus, quittons l'Amour	C major	1731, Second Recueil d'Airs Sérieux et à Boire	
RdB 035	Air à boire	Austère et fâcheuse raison	C major	1731, Second Recueil d'Airs Sérieux et à Boire	
RdB 036	Air sérieux	Tendre Amour, vole dans cet asile	G major	1731, Second Recueil d'Airs Sérieux et à Boire	
RdB 037	Air à boire	Que la table me paraît aimable	G minor	1731, Second Recueil d'Airs Sérieux et à Boire	
RdB 038	Air sérieux	Les plaisirs dans ce bocage	G major	1731, Second Recueil d'Airs Sérieux et à Boire	
RdB 039	Air sérieux	Je vis l'amour dans les regards d'Iris	G minor	1731, Second Recueil d'Airs Sérieux et à Boire	
RdB 040	Air à boire	De l'eau, buvez de l'eau	D minor	1731, Second Recueil d'Airs Sérieux et à Boire	
RdB 041	Air sérieux	Sous ce berceau qu'Amour exprès	C major	1731, Second Recueil d'Airs Sérieux et à Boire	
RdB 042	Air sérieux	Al bel lume del tuo nume	G minor	1731, Second Recueil d'Airs Sérieux et à Boire	
RdB 043	Air à boire	Sur Cupidon, Bacchus remporte la victoire	A minor	1731, Second Recueil d'Airs Sérieux et à Boire	
RdB 044	Air sérieux	Lorsque de mille objets	E minor	1731, Second Recueil d'Airs Sérieux et à Boire	
RdB 045	Air sérieux	Amour, peux-tu souffrir	D major	1731, Second Recueil d'Airs Sérieux et à Boire	
RdB 046	Air à boire	Que je me plais sous cette treille	D major	1731, Second Recueil d'Airs Sérieux et à Boire	

=== Concertos en trio ===
Philidor Catalog	Title	Key	Instrumentation	Movements	Publication	Recordings
RdB 101	Premier Concerto en Trio	C major	Musette or Vièle, Violin & Continuo	Gayement / Gracieusement / Gaiment	1736	
RdB 102	Deuxième Concerto en Trio	C major	Musette or Vièle, Violin & Viole/Continuo	Gaiment / Affectueusement / Gay	1736	
RdB 103	Troisième Concerto en Trio	C major	Musette or Vièle, Violin & Viole or Bassoon/Continuo	Gay / Gracieusement / Gay	1736	
RdB 104	Quatrième Concerto en Trio	C minor	Musette or Vièle, Violin & Viole/Continuo	Gay mais pas trop vite / Gracieusement / Gay	1736	
RdB 105	Cinquième Concerto en Trio	C major	Musette or Vièle, Violin & Continuo	Gay / Menuets I & II / Gay	1736	
RdB 106	Sixième Concerto en Trio	C major	Musette or Vièle, Violin & Continuo	Gigue: Gay / Menuet: Grave & 2ème Menuet / Fugue: Gayment	1736	

=== Cantates spirituelles ===
Philidor Catalog	Title	Key	Instrumentation	Movements	Publication	Recordings
RdB 201	Cantate tirée du Psaume 83	D minor	Mezzo-soprano, Viole & Continuo	Récit: Maison du Dieu vivant Air: (Très tendrement) Ô mon bien suprême Récit: Tu vois, Seigneur, ma secrete pensée Air: (Gravement et gai) C'est ton Christ, c'est ton ouvrage	1739, Premier Livre de Cantates Spirituelles	Brilliant Classics 94288, 2013, Cantates Spirituelles
RdB 202	Le triomphe de la vertu	G major	Mezzo-soprano, 2 Violins & Continuo	Air: (Rondement) Chantons, célébrons la victoire Récit: (Lent) Que cent fausses vertus Air: (Gai) Croissez, jeunesse florissante	1739, Premier Livre de Cantates Spirituelles	
RdB 203	Judith	B flat major	Soprano, 2 Violins & Continuo	Récit: 'Israël, c’est ton Dieu qui te garde Air: (Gay) Du Dieu des Hébreux, chantons la victoire Récit: Après cinq jours, la triste Béthulie; Air: (Gracieusement) Nous osons donc le soumettre Récit: (Animé – Doucement) Elle part Air: (Gay et marqué) Bruyante trompette, seconde nos voix	1739, Premier Livre de Cantates Spirituelles	K617 218, 2009 Cantates spirituelles de J. de la Guerre, Brossard et D. de Bousset; Arcobaleno 94332, 1999, Concert Spirituel
RdB 204	Le naufrage de Pharaon	F major	Basse, 2 Violins, Viole & Continuo	Récit: (Andante) Quelle effroyable nuit Air: Du Seigneur chantons la justice Récit: Dans sa fureur aveugle et meutrière Air: (Vivement et animé) Tout sert la colère divine Récit: Les tirans ne sont plus Air: (Affectueusement) Ce repos fut son ouvrage	1739, Premier Livre de Cantates Spirituelles	Brilliant Classics 94288, 2013, Cantates Spirituelles
RdB 205	Cantate tirée du Psaume 121	A major	Mezzo-soprano & Continuo	Récit: (Mesuré très tendrement) Nous reverrons donc ce Saint lieu Air: (Rondement et marqué) Tes habitants sont à ta porte Récit: Jérusalem, qui sors de ta ruine Air: (Gai) Que tout retentisse de notre bonheur	1739, Premier Livre de Cantates Spirituelles	
RdB 206	Cantate tirée du Psaume 147	E major	Soprano, 2 Violins & Continuo	Récit: (Lentement – Animé) Chante, Sion, bénis ton Dieu; Air: (Gai et marqué) Tout prêche à sa magnificence Récit: C'est ce grand Dieu qui parle Air: (Gay – Lentement) Bénis ton Dieu, chante, Sion	1739, Premier Livre de Cantates Spirituelles	Brilliant Classics 94288, 2013, Cantates Spirituelles
RdB 207	Abraham	B minor	Soprano, 2 Violins & Continuo	Récit: Sous l'aile du Seigneur; Air: (Lentement et marqué) Dieu quel ordre souverain Récit: (Très tendrement) Isaac était cher, Abraham était tendre Air: (Très lent et très tendre) Sans demander quel est ton crime Récit: Le coup allait partir Air: A la foi dressons un trophée	1740, Deuxième Livre de Cantates Spirituelles	Brilliant Classics 94288, 2013, Cantates Spirituelles
RdB 208	Cantate spirituelle en forme de dialogue	E minor	2 Sopranos, 2 Violins & Continuo	Duo: (Gravement) Elevons nos esprits Air: (Lentement) Il est. Lui seul possède l'être Duo: (Gracieusement) Que l'homme fait à son image Récit: Dans l'immense contour des Cieux; Air: (Gracieusement) Sous sa main comme tout s'arrange Air: (Musette: Gracieusement) Que de beautés la terre offre à la vue Duo: (Louré sans lenteur – Lentement) Ces côteaux si riants	1740, Deuxième Livre de Cantates Spirituelles	
RdB 209	Tobie	G minor	Soprano, Viole & Continuo	Récit: A peine les Tribus de Juda séparées Air: (Rondement) Aux lois du Ciel attentive Récit: La dure et superbe Assyrie; Air: (Tendrement) Dieu, fidèle à tes promesses Récit: (Tendrement) Pauvre, triste, misérable Air: (Rondement) Separé des méchants	1740, Deuxième Livre de Cantates Spirituelles	

=== Odes de Mr Rousseau ===
Philidor Catalog	Title	Key	Instrumentation	Movements	Publication	Recordings
RdB 301	Ode I: Caractère de l'Homme juste	G major	2 Mezzo-sopranos & Continuo	Duo: (Mesuré gracieusement) Seigneur dans ta gloire adorable Récit: (Gravement) Celui devant qui le superbe Duo: (Majestueusement – Vivement) Qui marchera dans cette voie	1740	
RdB 302	Ode II: Mouvements d'une âme	A minor	Mezzo-soprano, Bass, Viole & Continuo	Récit: (Gravement) Les Cieux instruisent la terre Duo: (Gaiment) De sa puissance imortelle Récit: L'Univers en sa présence Air: (Très tendre) Ô que tes oeuvres sont belles Air: (Lentement) Soutien ma foi chancelante Récit: Mais sans tes clartés sacrées Duo: (Gravement – Rondement – Lentement) Si de leur cruel empire	1740	
RdB 303	Ode III: Dieu, refuge et vertu	D major	Soprano, Bass, Viole or Cello & Continuo	Air: (Gracieusement) Puisque notre Dieu favorable Air: (Vivement) Par les ravages du tonnerre Duo: Les remparts de la cité sainte Récit: Les Nations à main armée Air: (Gei et animé) Venez Nations arrogantes Air: (Rondement) Par lui ces troupes infernales Duo: (Gaiement) Toi pour qui l'ardente victoire	1741	
RdB 304	Ode IV: Gloire du Seigneur	B flat major	Soprano & Continuo	Récit: La gloire du Seigneur, sa grandeur immortelle Air: (Gracieusement) Ô murs! ô séjour plein de gloire Récit: Cent Rois ligués entr'eux Air: (Gracieusement) Rien ne saurait troubler les lois inviolables Récit: (Gravement) Vous, filles de Sion; Air: (Gracieux et gai) Marquons lui notre amour	1742	
RdB 305	Ode V: Sur l'aveuglement des hommes du siècle	D minor	Soprano & Continuo	Récit: Qu'aux accents de ma voix Air: (Grave) L'Homme en sa propre force Récit: Que deviendront alors, répondez grands du monde Air: (Gai et animé) D'avides étrangers, transportés d'allégresse Récit: Les hommes éblouis de leurs honneurs frivoles Air: (Rondement et piqué) Justes, ne craignez point le vain pouvoir	1742	
RdB 306	Ode VI: Misère des réprouvés et félicité des élus	G major	Soprano, 2 Violins & Continuo	Air: (Gai) Peuples élevez vos concerts Récit: Pleine d'horreur et de respect Air: (Vif et marqué) Soyez à jamais confondus Récit: C'est moi qui du plus haut des Cieux; Air: (Gracieux et gai) Conduits pat tes vives clartés	1743	
RdB 307	Ode VII: Contre les Calomniateurs	G minor	Mezzo-soprano & Continuo	Récit: (Lentement) Dans ces jours destinés aux larmes Air: (Animé) Ô Dieu qui punis les outrages Récit: Hélas! dans quel climat sauvage Air: (Gracieusement et gai) J'ignorais la trame invisible	1744	
RdB 308	Ode VIII: Faiblesse des Hommes et grandeur de Dieu	C major	Soprano & Continuo	Air: (Très tendrement – Vivement) Mon âme, louez le Seigneur; Récit: Comme nous esclaves du sort Air: (Très tendre) Dieu seul doit faire notre esprit Récit: Il offre au timide étranger Air: (Gracieux et louré) Les jours des Rois sont dans sa main	1744	

=== Lost Works ===
Drouard de Bousset also composed an opera in 1729 L'Amour guéri par l'amour; 3 Grand Motets: Exaudiat te, Magnificat & Venite exultemus; 20 Petits Motets and a Book of Harpsichord Pieces published in 1754.

== Publications ==
- Ie. RECUEIL D'AIRS NOUVEAUX SERIEUX ET À BOIRE Dedié au Public COMPOSÉS PAR Mr. DE BOUSSET Maistre de Musique du Roy, pour les Academies des Inscriptions, et des Sciences. Gravé par du Plessy. Prix 3tt. SE VEND A PARIS. Chez L'Auteur, rüe du plastre au Marais. Le Sr. Boivin Marchand, rüe St. Honoré a la Regle d'Or. Le Sr. le Clerc, rüe du Roule a la Croix d'Or. Avec Privilege du Roy. 1731.
- IIe. RECUEIL D'AIRS NOUVEAUX SERIEUX ET À BOIRE Dedié au Public COMPOSÉS PAR Mr. DE BOUSSET Maistre de Musique du Roy, pour les Academies des Inscriptions, et des Sciences. Gravé par du Plessy. Prix 3tt. SE VEND A PARIS. Chez L'Auteur, rüe du plastre au Marais. Le Sr. Boivin Marchand, rüe St. Honoré a la Regle d'Or. Le Sr. le Clerc, rüe du Roule a la Croix d'Or./ Avec Privilege du Roy. 1731.
- CONCERTOS EN TRIOTS POUR LES VIELES ET MUSETTES Qui se peuvent joüer sur les Flutes Traversiere et a Bec, Hautbois et Violon. On peut doubler toutes les parties hors les Endroits Marqués Seuls et Duo. 1er Oeuvre. COMPOSÉS PAR Mr DE BOUSSET Maitre de Musique du Roy pour les Academies des Inscriptions, et des Sciences. 5tt En blanc. SE VENDENT A PARIS. Chez L'Auteur, rüe du Plastre Ste Avoye. La Veuve Boivin, rüe St Honoré a la Regle d'Or. Le Sr. le Clerc, rüe du Roule a la Croix d'Or. Avec Privilege du Roy. 1736.
- CANTATES SPIRITUELLES TIRÉES Des Pseaumes, des Histoires les plus interessantes de l'Ecriture Sainte, et autres sujets pieux. A Voix seule, avec Symphonie Et Sans Symphonie COMPOSÉES PAR Mr. DE BOUSSET Maître de Musique du Roy pour ses Academies des Inscriptions et des Sciences. Gravé par N. Baillieul le Jeune. PRIX EN BLANC 7.tt 10.s. Se Vendent a Paris chez l'Auteur ruë du Platre St. Avoye. La Veuve Boivin Mde. Ruë St. Honoré à la Regle d'Or, Le Sr. Le Clerc Md. Ruë du Roule à la Croix d'Or. Paris, l'auteur, Boivin, Le Clerc, 1739.
- IIeme RECEÜIL DE CANTATES SPIRITUELLES Tirées des Histoires les plus interessantes de L'ancien Testament. A Voix seule, et à deux Voix Avec Simphonie et sans Simphonie COMPOSÉES PAR MR. DE BOUSSET Maitre de Musique du Roy pour ses Academies des Inscriptions et des Sçiences. Organiste de l’Eglise Paroissiale de S. André des Arcs, et des Chanoines reguliers de Ste. Croix de la Bretonnerie. Gravées par Baillieul le jeune. Prix en blanc 4tt. SE VENDENT A PARIS Chez L'auteur ruë du Plâtre S. Avoye, La Veuve Boivin ruë S Honoré à la régle d'Or. Le Sr. Le Clerc rüe du Roule à la Croix d'Or. Le Sr. de la Guette Md. Libraire rüe St. Jacques à St. Antoine, et au Bon Pasteur. Avec Privilege du Roy 1740.
- Pièces de Clavecin composées par M. du Bousset Maître de Musique du Roi, pour ses Académies Royales des Inscriptions & des Sciences, & Organiste de la paroisse de S. André des Arts. Prix 6 liv. Chez l'Auteur, rue du Jouy, & aux Addresses ordinaires de Musique. 1754.

== Other publications, editions, recordings ==
- annual motet for the oratory of the Académie des sciences
- Felicity Smith The music of René Drouard de Bousset (1703–1760): a source study 2008
- Judith cantata – on Le Passage de la Mer Rouge cantatas by Elisabeth Jacquet de la Guerre, Brossard and Bousset. Ensemble Le Tendre Amour, Barcelona, with Luanda Siqueira, soprano. K617. 2009
- Cantatas from psalms 83 and 147, cantatas Le naufrage de Pharaon and Abraham. Ensemble Le Tendre Amour, Barcelona, with Michiko Takahashi, soprano and Bernhard Hansky, baritone. Brilliant Classics. 2013
- "IIe ODE de M. Rousseau" tirée du pseaume XVIII à deux voix, dessus & basse chantante avec la basse-continue, (1740). Jean-Baptiste Rousseau Poésies mises en musique, with Cécile Van Watter; Guillaume Durant; Ensemble Almazis, dir. Iakovos Pappas MAG 358.42. 2020
