= Mogens Pedersøn =

Danish instrumentalist and composer

Mogens Pedersøn (also Mogens Pedersen, Magno Petreo; c. 1583 – January or February 1623) was a Danish instrumentalist and composer. He is considered the most important Danish-born composer before Buxtehude.

== Life ==
Early in his career he entered the service of the monarch of Denmark–Norway, Christian IV. In 1599 he was selected to accompany Melchior Borchgrevinck and two other Danish court musicians to study with Giovanni Gabrieli in Venice, returning to Denmark in 1600. After continuing to study with Borchgrevinck, he was appointed an instrumentalist member of the royal chapel in 1603.

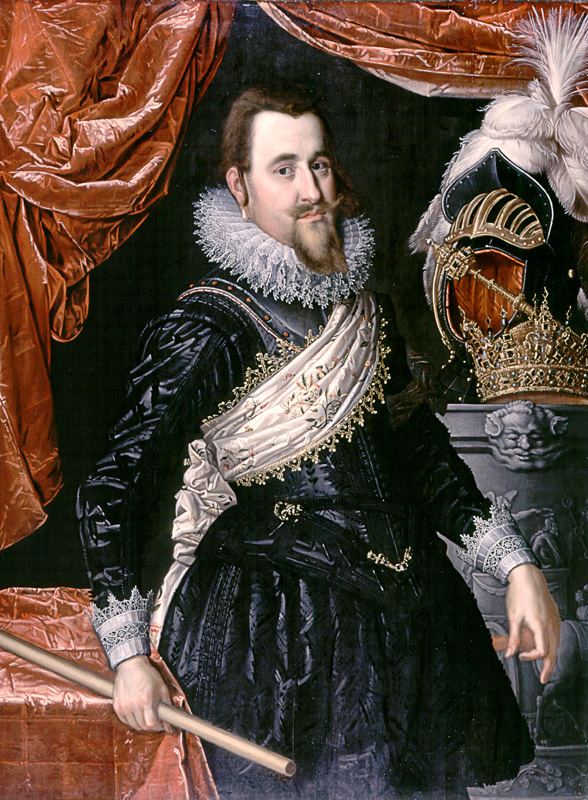
Christian IV, King of Denmark throughout Mogens Pedersøn's time at court

In 1605, Pedersøn undertook a further longer trip to study with Gabrieli with the support of King Christian, remaining in Venice for four years. During this time he published his first book of madrigals in 1608. These Italian madrigals are polyphonic compositions for five voices in a contemporary late Renaissance style.

He resumed his post at the Danish royal chapel in 1609. However, he was one of four court musicians to travel to England between 1611 and 1614. As James I of England was married to Anne of Denmark there was a natural connection between the two courts. It is from an English manuscript copy by Francis Tregian that Pedersøn's second book of madrigals is known.

Pedersøn was appointed assistant director of the Danish royal chapel (under Borchgrevinck) in 1618—the first Danish-born musician and composer to reach such a position.

In 1620, Pedersøn made a significant contribution to Danish church music with the publication of Pratum spirituale. This was intended to be a practical publication for use in worship and in schools and is organised according to the church calendar. The settings are for five voices, many using existing Danish Lutheran melodies. It includes six entirely original compositions, in an early Baroque style: a Danish language mass, two sets of responses, and three Latin motets.

Pedersøn last appears in official records in January 1623 and is thought to have died shortly afterwards, in Copenhagen.

== Works list ==
- Madrigali a 5 voci, libro primo (1608, Venice). Dedicated to King Christian IV of Denmark.
- Madrigali, libro secondo (1611). Partially lost; 10 madrigals have survived in manuscript copy.
- 2 madrigaletti in Hans Brachrogge's Madrigaletti a 3 voci (1619). Complete facsimile at the Danish Royal Library
- Pratum spirituale, d. e. Messer, Salmer, Motteter, som brugelig ere udi Danmark og Norge, komponerede med 5 Stemmer (1620, Copenhagen), dedicated to Prince Christian of Denmark. Complete facsimile at the Danish Royal Library
- Two pavans for 5 viols. Only three of the parts have survived.

=== Selected recordings ===
- Mogens Pedersøn Sacred Music From The court Of Christian IV: 3 Hymns from Pratum Spirituale. Ad Te Levavi Oculos Meos. Missa Quinque Vocum. John Dowland Thou Mighty God. Vocal Group ARS NOVA, Bo Holten Kontrapunkt 32100
