= Jean-Baptiste Drouart de Bousset =

French composer

Jean-Baptiste Drouard de Bousset (French pronunciation: [ʒɑ̃ batist dʁuaʁ də busɛ]; 1662 - 3 October 1725) was a French baroque composer.

He was born in Asnières, Province of Burgundy, of minor nobility, and became maître de musique of the chapelle of the Louvre. He died in Paris.

His son René Drouard de Bousset was a noted organist who also published two series of cantatas on biblical subjects.

== Works, editions, recordings ==
Works

- Psaumes paraphrased by Elisabeth-Sophie Chéron (1648–1711), Ballard Paris.

Recordings

- Les Fastes De Bacchus, dir. Michel Verschaeve, La Compagnie Baroque. Arion
- Airs Sérieux, Elizabeth Dobbin, Le Jardin Secret. Fuga Libera (Outhere, 2016)
