= Truid Aagesen =

Danish composer and organist

- Born: fl. 1593–1625; Denmark
- Other names: Theodoricus Sistinus, Trudo Haggaei Malmogiensis
- Occupations: Composer, organist
- Notable work: Cantiones (1608)

Truid Aagesen (fl. 1593–1625) was a Danish composer and organist. His only known published music is a set of secular Cantiones for three voices which were published in Hamburg in 1608 under his Latinized name, Theodoricus Sistinus. He was also known under the name Trudo Haggaei Malmogiensis.

Little is known about Aagesen's early life but his musical mentor and spiritual adviser was Norwegian-born Jesuit Laurentius Nicolai with whom he studied music. Aagesen was appointed organist of Vor Frue Kirke in Copenhagen on 23 June 1593. He studied in Venice with Giovanni Gabrieli from 1599 to 1600.

In 1600, he went to Prague as a royal commissioner for the King Christian IV. Between 1609 and 1611, he is supposed to have taught at the court and therefore received subsidies from the royal treasury. In 1613, the Danish king published a letter stating that all men of the "Roman Catholic" religion must leave Denmark. Aagesen, who had been suspected of being on the Pope's payroll as early as 1604, was informed of a ruling made in the governing body of Copenhagen University on 15 September 1613 that, since he had Catholic sympathies, he should not be allowed to continue as organist. In 1615, he was replaced by Johan Meincke. After that he is known to have lived in Danzig (now Gdańsk) in 1625.

== Works ==
- Italian Cantiones for three voices (1608)
- Missa Baci amorosi for five voices (unpublished)
- Canon (unpublished)

== Other sources ==
- John Bergsagel, Heinrich Schütz und die Musik in Dänemark, 1985, (p. 19–24)
- John Bergsagel and Ole Kongsted. "Aagesen, Truid." In Grove Music Online. Oxford Music Online. (accessed March 19, 2012).
- Oskar Garstein, Rome and the Counter-Reformation in Scandinavia: Jesuit Educational Strategy, 1992 (p. 166)
- Spotify
