= William Brade =

English composer (1560–1630)

William Brade (1560 – 26 February 1630) was an English composer, violinist, and viol player of the late Renaissance and early Baroque eras, mainly active in northern Germany. He was the first Englishman to write a canzona, an Italian form, and probably the first to write a piece for solo violin.

== Biography ==
Little is known about his early life. Around 1590 he left England to pursue a musical career in Germany, as did several other prominent English musicians, sensing better job opportunities abroad. He switched employments often between the various courts in north Germany and Denmark. Between his arrival in Germany, sometime around 1590, and 1594 he worked for the Brandenburg court; between 1594 and 1596 he worked for Christian IV of Denmark in Copenhagen; then until 1599 he was back in Brandenburg. He returned that year to Copenhagen, where he stayed until 1606. From 1606 to 1608 he worked at Bückeburg in Brunswick-Lüneburg. From 1608 to 1610 he was employed in Hamburg, but he returned to Bückeburg in 1610. Evidently by 1612 he was again planning on switching jobs, for a letter surviving from that year, written by the count at Bückeburg, tells the Hamburg court pithily that he was a "wanton, mischievous fellow" and should not be allowed to have his way.

However, in spite of the warning by his former employer, by 1613 he was working in Hamburg. Two years later—he liked to swap jobs every two years—he returned to Copenhagen, but in 1618 he moved on to Halle where he obtained the position of kapellmeister to the Prince of Magdeburg, Christian Wilhelm of Brandenburg (1598–1631). By 1619 he was in Berlin, and the next year he returned to Copenhagen yet again. Two years later he moved to Gottorp in Schleswig-Holstein, where he served as director of the Hofkapelle until 1625.

His last years were spent in Hamburg, one of the few refuges available within Germany from the ravages of the Thirty Years' War. There is no evidence that he ever returned to England.

== Compositions ==
All of Brade's surviving music is for string instruments, and most is for dancing. The earlier music, for example, in his collection published in 1609 in Hamburg, is based on English models, and similar to the contemporary work of composers such as Peter Philips and John Dowland. Later he began to work with Italian models, writing the first known canzona by an Englishman; in addition he began to arrange his dances into suites, a practice which would become common during the Baroque era. Some of the dances he wrote were in forms previously unknown in Germany such as the branle, maschera, and volta.

His coral, a set of variations on a ground bass, is considered to be the earliest music written for the solo violin by an English composer; however, its attribution is not completely certain, for another source dated 1684 gives the name of another composer.

Stylistically, his music is more homophonic than much of the music by his English contemporaries, who still preferred a polyphonic idiom.

As a performer, he was famous for his fine technique; he was one of the most famous early violinists, and highly regarded in Germany. Several pieces by other composers were published in Hamburg as tributes to him after his death.
