= Erster Theil etlicher Choräle =

Collection of liturgical organ music by Johann Pachelbel

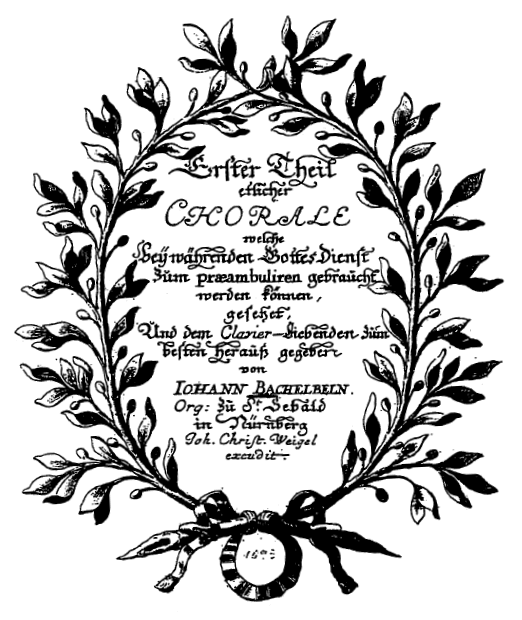
Facsimile of the title page of Erster Theil etlicher Choräle

Erster Theil etlicher Choräle (commonly known as Acht Choräle zum Präambulieren, PWC 45–52, T. 1–8, PC 1–8) is a collection of liturgical organ music by Johann Pachelbel, published during his lifetime. It contains eight chorale preludes in seven different styles.

== General information ==
Erster Theil etlicher Choräle (literally "First Part of [a collection of] assorted chorales") is one of Pachelbel's earliest publications. It is a mystery, however, when or where it was first published. Johann Mattheson mentions that the first edition appeared before 1693, while the edition lacked any indications of the year of publication. The only copy extant today is a Nuremberg edition by Johann Christoph Weigel, who also published Pachelbel's Hexachordum Apollinis (1699) and a reprint of his Musicalische Ergötzung. This copy is marked "1693", however, there are two problems with this date. The first is that it was added by another hand at a later date, the second is that Weigel did not start working in Nuremberg until at least 1698. Thus, the surviving copy must be a second or a third edition. Given the number of reprints, Erster Theil must have enjoyed considerable popularity. The title indicates that Pachelbel may have wished to publish a set of chorale collections, however, no other chorale publications by him are known.

Johann Christoph Bach (1671–1721), Johann Sebastian's eldest brother and one of Pachelbel's most important pupils, may have assisted with the publication of the first edition of Erster Theil etlicher Choräle, for the engraving closely resembles his handwriting.

A manuscript collection of chorale preludes by Johann Christoph Bach (1642–1703), Johann Sebastian's first cousin once removed, organist at Eisenach (where Pachelbel made acquaintance with members of the Bach family during his stay there 1677–1678), may have some connection to Pachelbel's Erster Theil, given the similarity of not only the subject but also the titles of both collections:

- Pachelbel: Erster Theil etlicher Choräle welche bey wärendem Gottes Dienst zum Prämbuliren gebrauchet werden können
- Bach: 44 Choräle welche bey wärenden Gottes-Dienst zum Praembuliren gebraucht werden können

It is not known, however, who influenced whom. No other printed collections of chorale preludes survive from the period, making Pachelbel's Erster Theil unique in its choice of subject. Decades after its publication, the collection was singled out by Mattheson, who described the contents as "models [of chorale writing] not to be dismissed" in his Der vollkommene Capellmeister (1739).

== Contents ==
=== Ich ruf zu dir, Herr Jesu Christ ===
This famous chorale is presented as a very straightforward three-voice piece, with the cantus firmus in upper voice and brief snatches of fore-imitation in the lower voices throughout the setting.

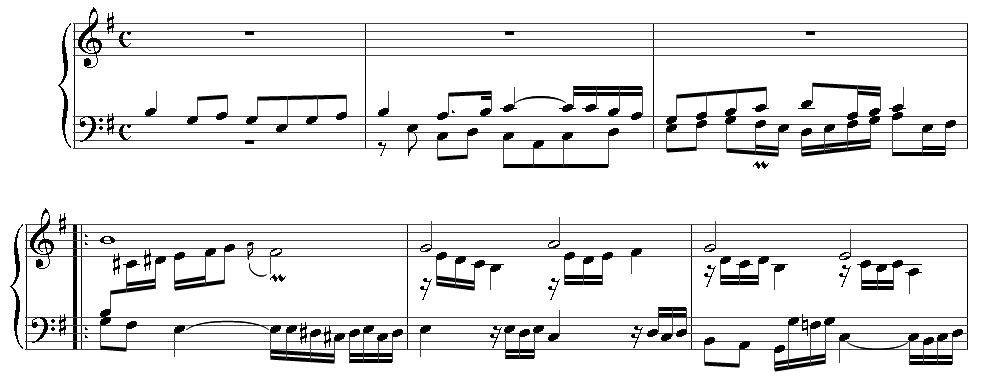

=== Wie schön leuchtet der Morgenstern ===
The chorale "Wie schön leuchtet der Morgenstern", associated variously with Epiphany, Whit, Annunciation, and Sundays after Trinity, is set by Pachelbel as a three-voice prelude with the chorale in the bass voice. Pachelbel uses fore-imitation throughout the piece: whenever the next phrase of the chorale is about to begin, the upper voices anticipate its melodic contour in brief imitative passages.

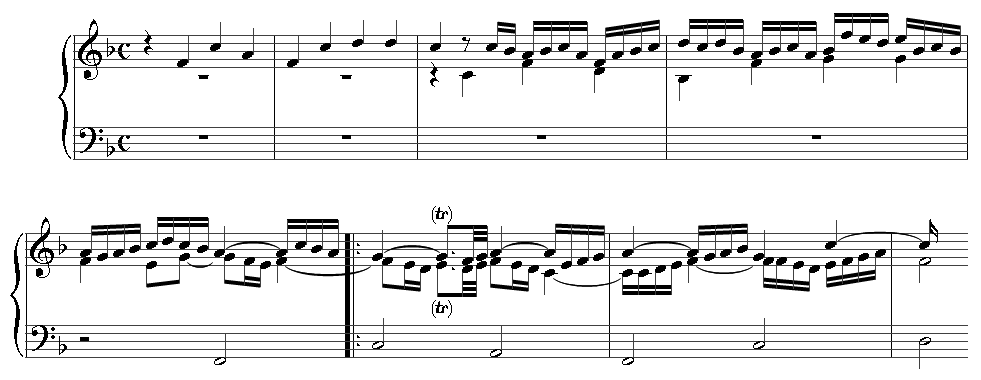

=== Nun lob, mein Seel, den Herren ===
The chorale "Nun lob, mein Seel, den Herren", an old doxology setting of Psalm 103, is presented by Pachelbel in a three-voice setting with the cantus firmus in the tenor voice. The arrangement of voices and the white mensural notation, both derived from the German polyphonic song, are unique in Pachelbel's surviving oeuvre, as is the ornamentation used in Wir glauben all an einen Gott.

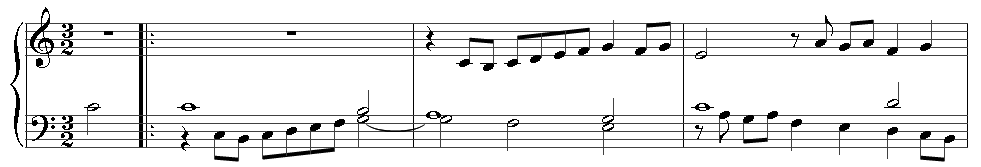

=== Vater unser im Himmelreich ===
The chorale "Vater unser im Himmelreich" is a famous hymn, a versification of the Lord's Prayer. Pachelbel presents it as a four-voice setting with the chorale in the upper voice. Fore-imitation is used throughout the piece in well-developed three-voice sections, resulting in what Pachelbel scholar Kathryn Welter described as "the most magnificent of the eight preludes [of Erster Theil] in its discipline of construction and richness of harmonies."

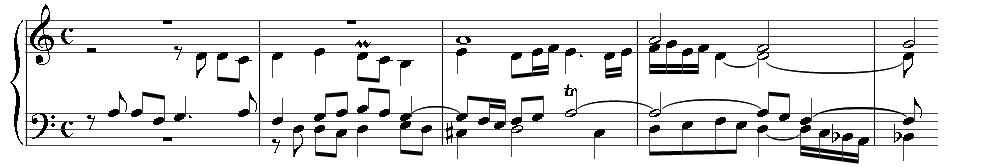

=== Wir glauben all an einen Gott ===
This setting of the German Creed "Wir glauben all an einen Gott" is the only known example of ornamented cantus firmus setting in Pachelbel's surviving works. The style, which goes back to the time of Jan Pieterszoon Sweelinck and Heinrich Scheidemann, was not wholly unknown to Pachelbel, for he would normally use ornamentation in his chorale variations. A possible explanation is that Pachelbel may have been reluctant to use ornamentation in pieces intended for congregational singing. He probably included the piece in Erster Theil as a model. The setting is in three voices, and the ornamented chorale is in the upper voice.

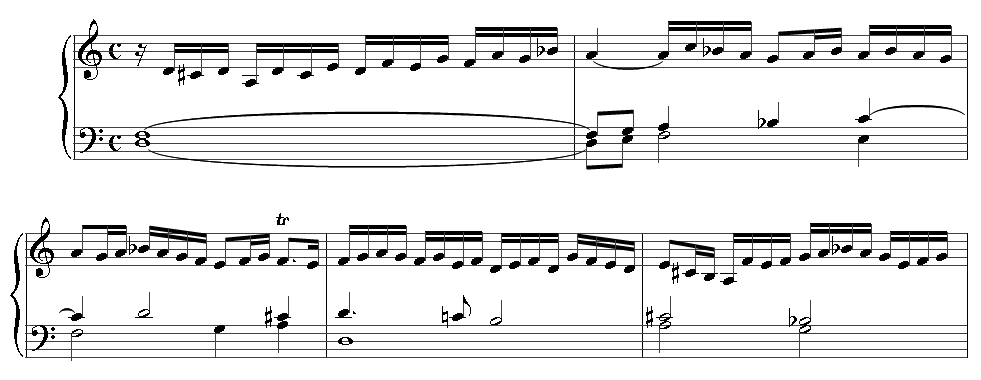

=== Dies sind dir heil'gen zehn Gebot ===
The text of the chorale references the Ten Commandments. Pachelbel's setting (P 50a) is a four-voice fugue in G mixolydian. The first line of the chorale is used as the subject, which appears 11 times. The last statement of the subject is in the lowest voice, establishing with the final notes the pitch the congregation would enter after the piece is performed by the organist. Another setting (P 50b) was formerly attributed to Pachelbel and included in this set. It has since been attributed to Johann Gottfried Walther.

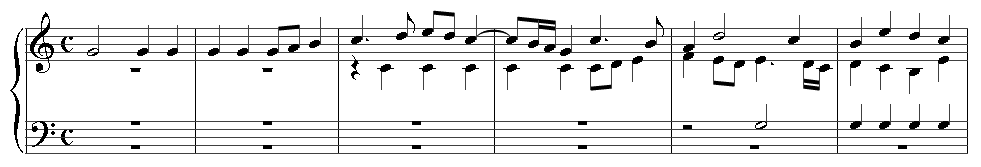

=== Jesus Christus unser Heiland, der von uns ===
The well-known Communion hymn "Jesus Christus, unser Heiland, der von uns den Gotteszorn wandt" is treated by Pachelbel in a manner most unexpected for the period: the setting is a bicinium, i.e. a two-voice piece with the chorale in long notes in one voice and fast ornamental passages in the other voice. Such pieces were very popular about a hundred years before Pachelbel's time, but by the end of the 17th century they were rarely seen. Pachelbel modifies the old form by splitting the bicinium into two sections: the first has the cantus firmus in the upper voice and the ornaments in the lower voice, while the second (starting at bar 30) reverses this arrangement. Further modification of the classic bicinium form occurs when Pachelbel uses the technique of fore-imitation (for which he was particularly known), when the ornamental passages include motifs that anticipate the chorale melody. The technique is used in many instances throughout the piece, including the very first bars.

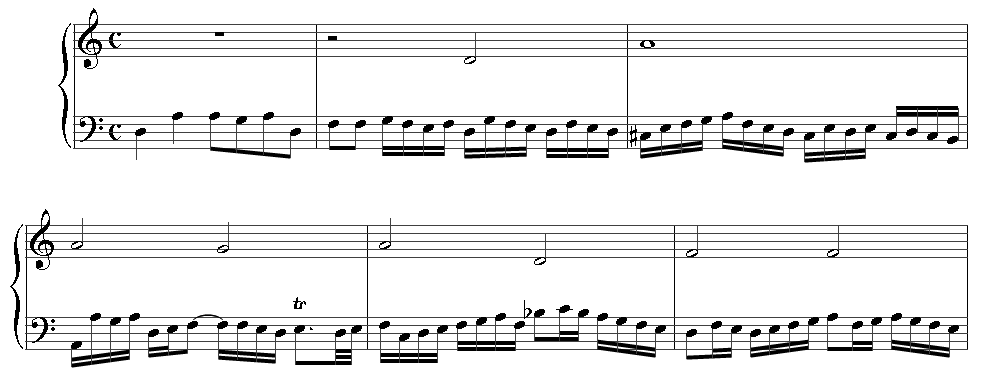

=== Vom Himmel hoch, da komm' ich her ===
For the last piece of the collection Pachelbel chose Martin Luther's famous Christmas hymn "Vom Himmel hoch, da komm ich her." He sets it as a three-voice piece with the chorale in the bass. Unlike Wie schön leuchtet der Morgenstern which uses the same arrangement, the upper voices do not provide mere fore-imitation, but engage in highly original figurations. Pachelbel scholar Ewald Nolte suggested that these were probably intended as imitations of birdsong, a somewhat popular phenomenon in the instrumental music of the 17th century. In any case, these fanciful figurations, together with the compound 12/8 meter, suggest a pastoral mood.

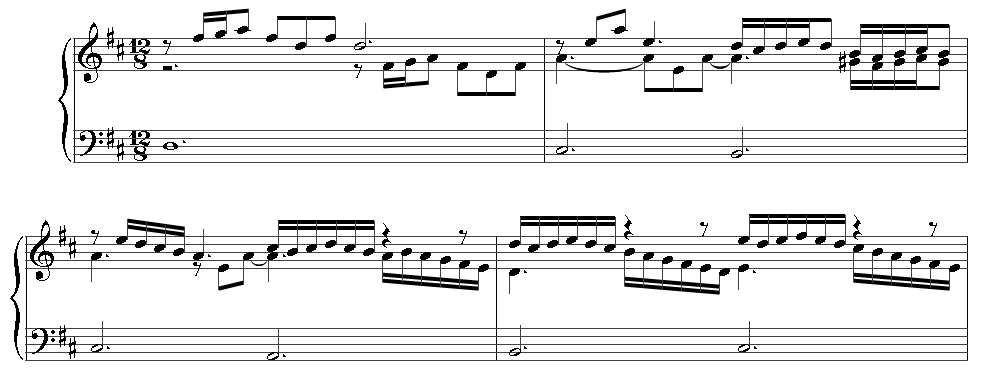
