= Pachelbel (surname) =

Pachelbel (German pronunciation: [ˈpaxɛlbl̩], [ˈpaxl̩bɛl], or [paˈxɛlbl̩]) is the surname of several people:

- Johann Pachelbel (1653–1706), German composer
- Wilhelm Hieronymus Pachelbel (c. 1685–1764), German composer, son of Johann
- Amalia Pachelbel (1688–1723), German painter and engraver, daughter of Johann
- Charles Theodore Pachelbel (1690–1750), German composer, son of Johann
