= Hexachordum Apollinis =

1699 music collection by Pachelbel

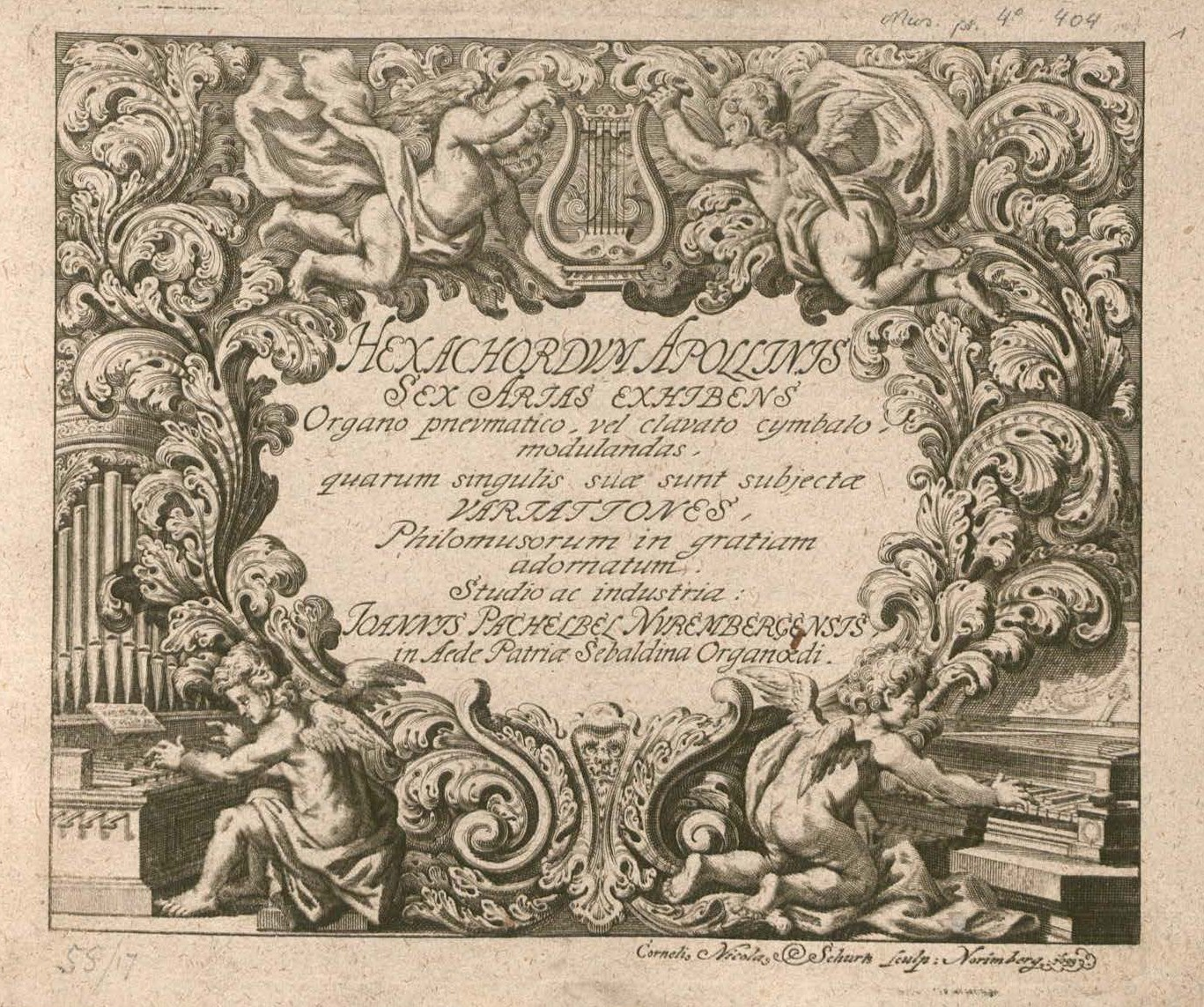
Facsimile of the frontispiece of Hexachordum Apollinis.

Hexachordum Apollinis (PWC 193–8, T. 211–6, PC 131–6, POP 1–6) is a collection of keyboard music by Johann Pachelbel, published in 1699. It comprises six arias with variations, on original themes, and is generally regarded as one of the pinnacles of Pachelbel's oeuvre. The collection includes a preface in which Pachelbel dedicates the work to Dieterich Buxtehude and Ferdinand Tobias Richter and briefly discusses the nature of music.

== General information ==
Hexachordum Apollinis (the title roughly translates to "Six Strings of Apollo") was published in 1699 in Nuremberg by Johann Christoph Weigel, a publisher who had worked with Pachelbel before. The frontispiece, created by Cornelius Nicolaus Schurz, describes the collection as "six arias to be played on the organ, or the harpsichord, to whose simple melodies are added variations for the pleasure of Friends of the Muses." The instruments mentioned are referenced on the frontispiece: two cherubs are pictured, one playing a pipe organ (possibly with a pedalboard), the other a single-manual harpsichord or clavichord.

Pachelbel wrote a short preface (dated November 20, 1699), in which he dedicated the collection to Dieterich Buxtehude and Ferdinand Tobias Richter and expresses a hope that his eldest son Wilhelm Hieronymus might study with one of them (it is unknown whether this hope was realized). Pachelbel also confesses that "something weightier and more unusual" than this work should have been written for the occasion, apparently feeling that this is not his best work. Pachelbel alludes to the "friendly nature" of Buxtehude and Richter, which might indicate that he knew one of them or both, perhaps through correspondence.

Another topic discussed in the preface is the nature of music. Pachelbel writes that music is the finest of the arts, governing human emotions and desires, and expresses the "belief of many" that music comes from the "Dreymal-Heilig" sung by angels and from the movement of celestial bodies (a belief, Pachelbel points out, shared by Pythagoras and Plato). A separate page of the preface illuminates a cabalistic aspect of Hexachordum Apollinis: using an alphabet provided by Pachelbel's lifelong friend Johann Beer, the letters of the inscription "JOHANNES PACHELBELIVS ORGANISTA NORIBERGHENSIVM" are translated into numbers with the total sum of 1699, the year of publication; further research has illustrated that a similar alphabet will produce a 3:1 ratio with "Johannes Pachelbelius Hexachordum" (303) and "Apollinis" (101). Other instances of numerological devices in Hexachordum Apollinis may exist, but as of 2015 are yet to be researched.

Of all published works by Pachelbel, Hexachordum Apollinis had the widest distribution and survives in more than 10 copies in various libraries in Berlin, London, The Hague, Rochester, and other cities.

== Analysis ==
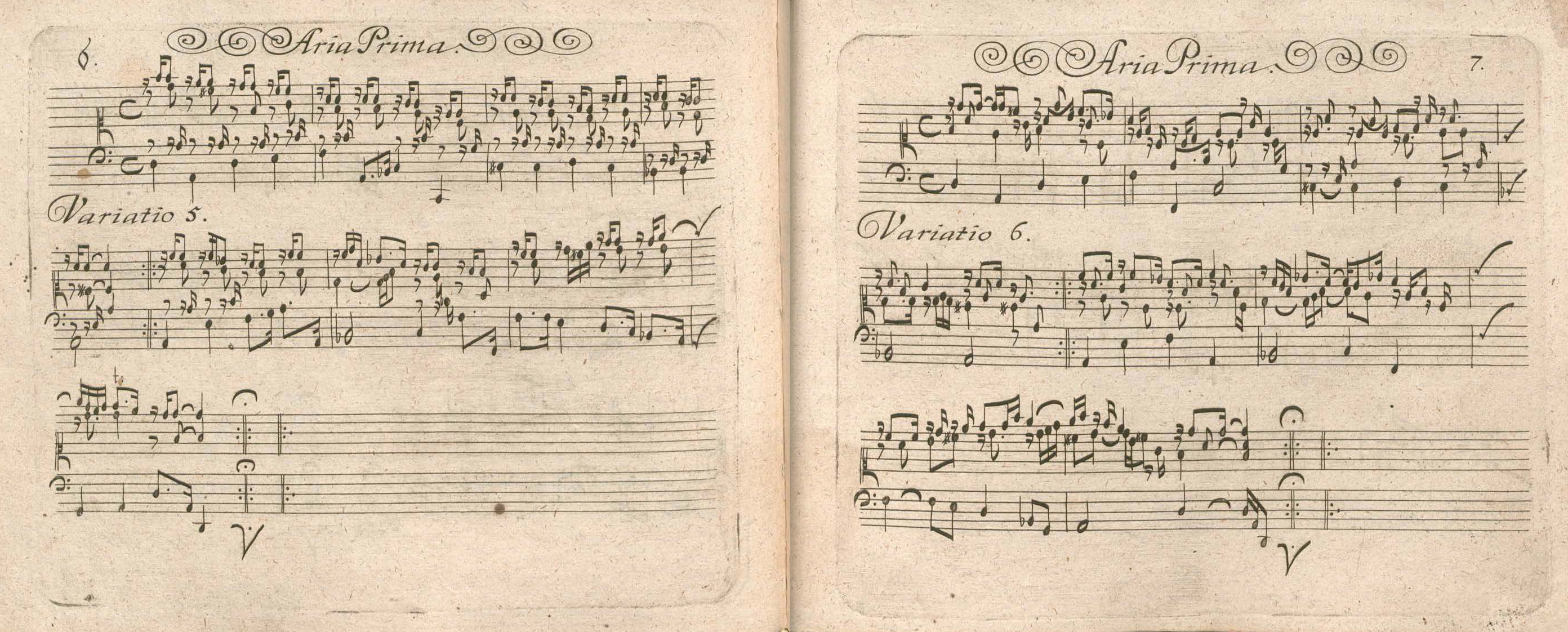
The fifth and the sixth variations from Aria Prima, as they appeared in the first edition. Note that both variations display characteristic style brisé figurations.

The collection contains six arias with variations, all on original, secular themes. The practice of composing variations on original themes was a relatively new one (one previous instance was Frescobaldi's Aria detta la Frescobalda from the 1627 Secondo libro di toccate; of Pachelbel's contemporaries Bernardo Pasquini was one of the main exponents of this trend), and Pachelbel was among the first in Europe to explore the form. The overall plan of Hexachordum Apollinis is as follows:

Piece	Key	Number of variations
Aria Prima	D minor (Dorian)	6
Aria Secunda	E minor	5
Aria Tertia	F major	6
Aria Quarta	G minor (Dorian)	6
Aria Quinta	A minor	6
Aria Sexta Sebaldina	F minor (Mixolydian)	8

There is a distinct difference between Aria Sebaldina and the preceding five arias. First of all, the first arias are arranged so that their keys span a perfect fifth, the keys of a hexachord. According to the old hexachordal principle the sixth aria should have been in B♭ major. Pachelbel does use two flats, as expected, but the key actually used is F minor (in modern standard, four flats). Furthermore, this aria is in 3/4 time, whereas the other arias are in common time. The number of variations is larger than that of any other aria, and Aria Sebaldina is also the only one provided with a subtitle. Sebaldina almost certainly refers to St. Sebaldus Church in Nuremberg, where Pachelbel was working at the time. Scholar Willi Apel once suggested that the aria's melody may have been a traditional tune associated somehow with the church, and not an original Pachelbel composition.

Pachelbel's themes are simple song-like pieces in two sections: four bars in the first section and four or eight in the second. Both sections are repeated. The variations conform to the same concept: most are in common time (except for Aria Sebaldina, in which all variations are in triple time, like the theme) and explore various constant harmony and melodic outline models. Although the frontispiece indicates that the work is intended for either organ or harpsichord, much of the music is better suited for the latter, particularly the brisé figurations, broken chords, and a number of variations that introduce various non-keyboard styles: the strumming of a plucked string instrument, lute style brisé, etc. (see Example 1).

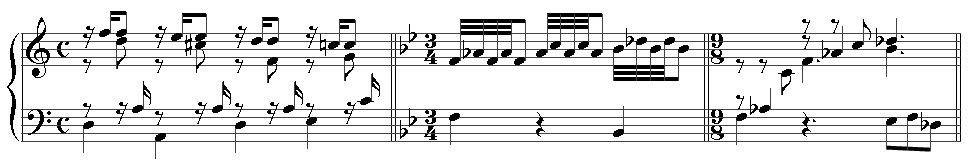
Example 1. Samples of non-keyboard styles in Hexachordum Apollinis: Aria Prima, Variation 5, bar 1; Aria Sexta (Sebaldina), Variation 5, bar 1 (imitates the strumming of a plucked string instrument); and Aria Sexta (Sebaldina), Variation 7, bar 5.

== Media ==
Aria Quinta for organ
The fifth Aria from 'Hexachordum Apollinis' (1699) played by Tibor Pinter on the sample set of the organ in Smecno, Czech Republic built cca. 1587 .

Aria Sexta for organ
The sixth Aria (Aria Sebaldina)from 'Hexachordum Apollinis' (1699) played by Tibor Pinter on the sample set of the organ in Zlata Koruna, Czech Republic built 1699.

== See also ==
- List of compositions by Johann Pachelbel
