= Salomon Schweigger =

German theologian and orientalist (1551–1622)

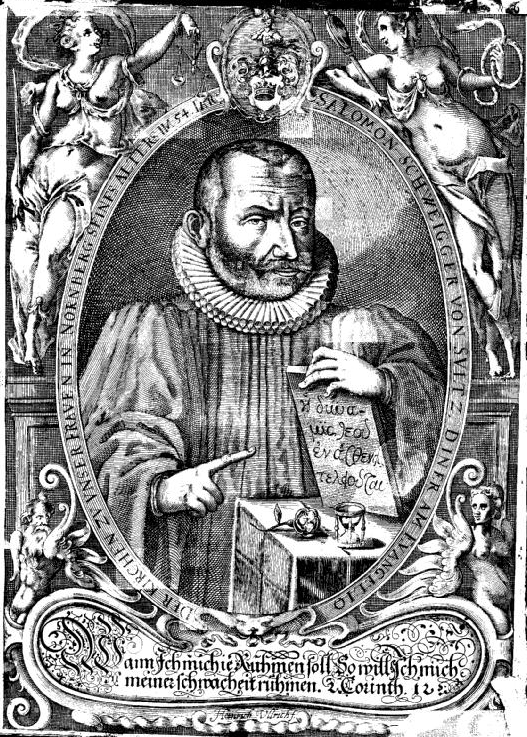
Salomon Schweigger

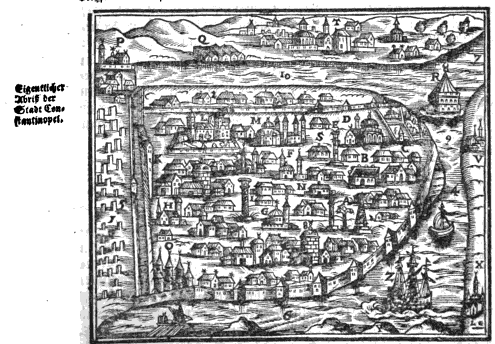
Schweigger's illustration of Constantinople c. 1578

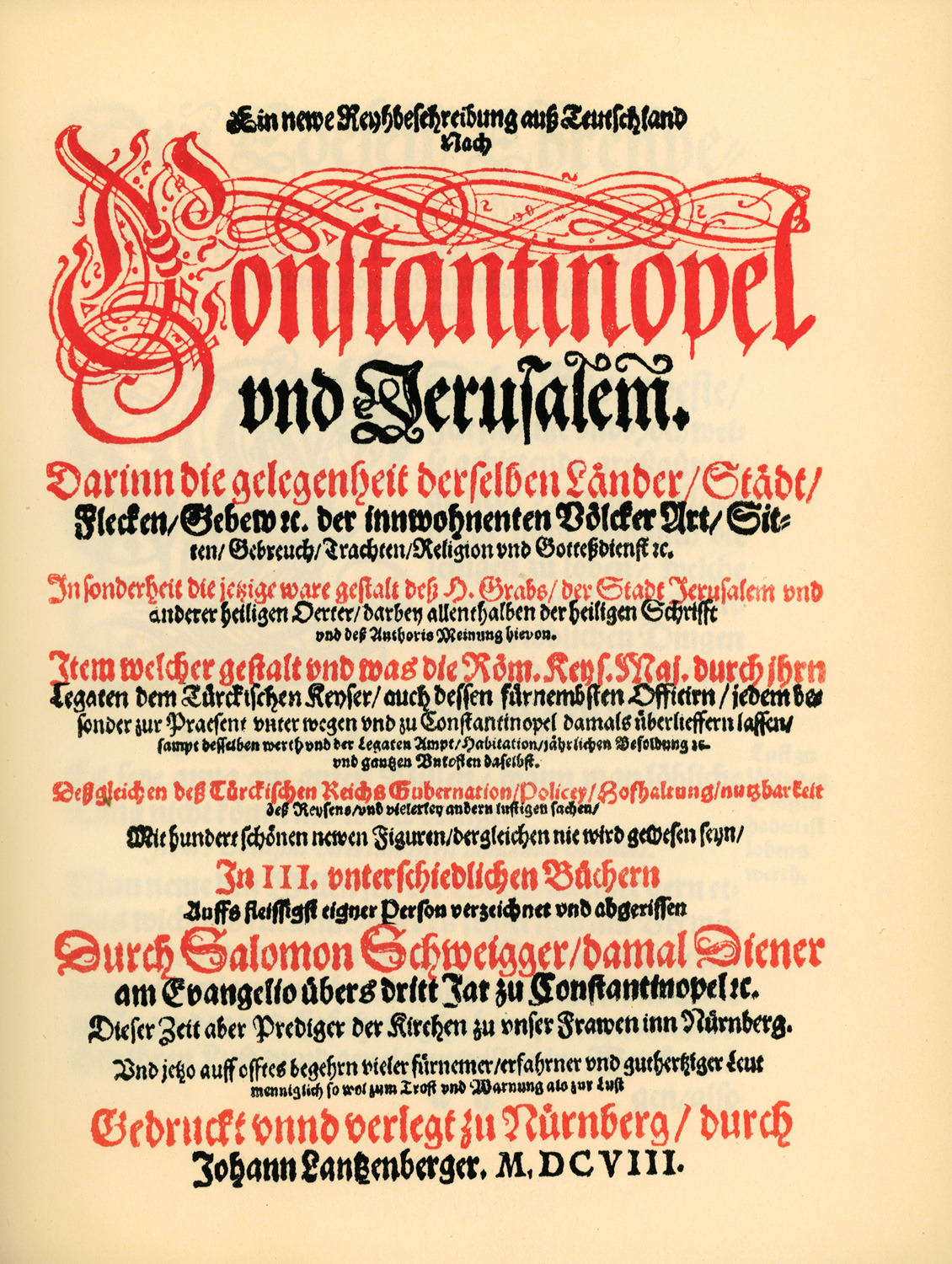
Ein newe Reiss Beschreibung auss Teutschland nach Constantinopel und Jerusalem (1608) title page

Salomon Schweigger (also spelled Solomon Schweiger) (30 March 1551 – 21 June 1622) was a German Lutheran theologian, minister, anthropologist and orientalist of the 16th century. He provided insights during his travels in the Balkans, Constantinople and the Middle East, and published a travel book of his exploits. He also published the first German language translation of the Qur'an.

== Biography ==
Schweigger was born in Sulz am Neckar. His father was Henry Schweigger, notarius (court and town clerk) and praefectus pupillorum (superior of the orphanage children in Sulz). Salomon first attended the convent school in Bad Herrenalb-Alpirsbach, and from 1572, studied theology and classical philology at the University of Tübingen.

In 1576, having completed his studies and being in search of employment, he was hired as embassy chaplain by Joachim von Sintzendorff, Habsburg ambassador to Istanbul (1578–81). He traveled as a Habsburgian envoy to Constantinople with an Austrian delegation from Vienna on a diplomatic mission of Emperor Rudolf II to Sultan Murad III. He spent several years attached the Habsburg embassy, in the role of Hofprediger (court preacher) successor to Stephan Gerlach. In this travel diary, he vividly describes his personal experiences and also provides an interesting insight into life in the former Ottoman Empire. He deduced that "Serbians, Bulgarians, Rascians, have their origins in the ancient German tribes of Daci", and also wrote about Bulgarian jewelry, curious at the nose rings he saw worn by the women and the "exoticism" he witnessed. He also commented on jugglers, fires, the "clumsy" music of the Turks, their food, customs, and buildings.

He left Constantinople in 1581 and traveled to Egypt and Jerusalem, where he quoted Adam Reusner. Visiting Ramla, he commented on the Jewish populations in the city. In Egypt, he traveled with Gerlach and David Chytraeus. He also visited Damascus before returning to Germany via Crete and Venice. On returning to Germany, Schweigger served as pastor in the town of Grötzingen from 1581–1589. In 1589, Heinrich Hermann Baron Schutzbar von Milchling, appointed Schweigger to be patron of the parish of Wilhermsdorf in Middle Franconia. The City of Nuremberg called him in 1605 to serve at the Frauenkirche where he worked for 17 years.

His account of his years spent in the Balkans, Turkey and the Middle East would later gain fame in his "Ein newe Reiss Beschreibung aus Teutschland Nach Constantinopel und Jerusalem", published in 1608. Several of his sketches appeared centuries later in Kiril Petkov's 1997 book Infidels, Turks, and Women: The South Slavs in the German Mind, ca. 1400-1600. In 1616, he published "The Turkish Alcoran, religion, and superstition". Solomon is also the author of the first German version of the Qur'an. In the Ottoman Empire, Schweigger found an Italian translation of the Qur'an, which was known among Christians living there to a certain extent. Schweigger translated from the Italian but published it only after his return to Nuremberg (1616, 2nd ed., 1623, further editions without naming 1659; 1664). He translated from a first Italian version of 1547 by Andrea Arrivabene, itself based on translation from Latin by Robert of Ketton in the 12th century. It is surprising that Schweigger did not resort to the Latin text. Schweigger's German translation of the Italian translation of the Latin translation of the Arabic Koran was in turn translated into Dutch in 1641 and printed in Hamburg.

== Personal life ==
He was first married to Susanna Michael (d. 1585 in Grötzingen) from Memmingen, who in 1583 gave birth to his first son, Immanuel, who became the father of the Nuremberg sculptor, Georg Schweigger. Salomon married Elisabetha Vischer on 13 September 1585. On 16 September 1588, their son Solomon was born, whose descendants lived in Nuremberg. He died, aged 71, in Nürnberg, and was buried at St. Rochus Cemetery.

== Literature ==
- Heyd, Wilhelm von, Schweigger, Salomon. In: Allgemeine Deutsche Biographie (ADB). Band 33, Duncker & Humblot, Leipzig 1891, S. 339 f.
- Schweigger, S., & Stein, H. (1986). Zum Hofe des türkischen Sultans. Leipzig: F.A. Brockhaus.
- Schweigger, Valentin (1879). Genealogie der Familie Schweigger. Handschrift Nürnberg.
