= Musicalische Ergötzung =

Collection of chamber music by Pachelbel

Musicalische Ergötzung (English: Musical Delight, PWC 370a–375, T. 331–336, PC 348–353) is a collection of chamber music by Johann Pachelbel. Published during his lifetime, it contains six suites for two violins and basso continuo.

The exact circumstances of the German-titled work's publication are unknown. The only extant copy of the original print was published in or after 1699 in Nuremberg, by Johann Christoph Weigel, a publisher who also issued several other works by Pachelbel. Yet Johann Mattheson, writing some decades after Pachelbel's death, claimed that Musicalische Ergötzung was first published in 1691.

The collection contains six parties, or suites:

1. Partie I in F major: Sonata (Allegro) – Allemande – Courante – Ballet – Sarabande – Gigue
2. Partie II in C minor: Sonata – Gavotte – Trezza – Aria – Sarabande – Gigue
3. Partie III in E♭ major: Sonata (Allegro) – Allemande – Courante – Gavotte – Sarabande – Gigue
4. Partie IV in E minor: Sonata (Adagio) – Aria – Courante – Aria – Chaconne
5. Partie V in C major: Sonata – Aria – Trezza – Chaconne
6. Partie VI in B♭ major: Sonata (Adagio) – Aria – Courante – Gavotte – Sarabande – Gigue

These are not the exact titles in the original published edition but "normalized" into a more modern international terminology. For example, in the original German edition, "Chaconne" was spelled "Ciacona", "Gigue" as "Gigg", "Courante" as "Courant", etc.

The technique of scordatura (alternative tuning used for the open strings) is applied to the violin parts of all suites, but, unlike contemporary composers such as Heinrich Ignaz Biber, Pachelbel used it sparingly, not to produce special effects but to teach the amateur performers (for whom the work was probably intended) the basics of this technique.

The following violin tunings are given by the composer in the original print:

1. Partie: c' f' c f
2. Partie: c' g' c f
3. Partie: b♭ e♭' b♭' e♭
4. Partie: b e' b' e
5. Partie: c' g' c f
6. Partie: b♭ f' b♭' e♭
