= Wilhelm Hieronymus Pachelbel =

German composer and organist

- Born: Erfurt, Electorate of Mainz
- Baptised: 29 August [O.S. 19 August] 1686
- Died: 6 June 1764 (aged 77); Nuremberg
- Works: Seven known compositions for keyboard
- Father: Johann Pachelbel
- Relatives: Amalia Pachelbel (sister); Charles Theodore Pachelbel (brother)

Wilhelm Hieronymus Pachelbel (baptized 29 August [O.S. 19 August] 1686 – 6 June 1764) was a German composer and organist, the elder son of Johann Pachelbel.

== Life ==
He was born in Erfurt, Electorate of Mainz, and spent the first four years of his life there. The Pachelbel family moved to Stuttgart in 1690, then, fleeing from the War of the Grand Alliance, to Gotha in 1692, and finally to Nuremberg in 1695. Wilhelm Hieronymus almost certainly received his first music education from his father. By age 14 he was proficient enough on the keyboard to receive special commendation from the town council of Nuremberg. After leaving Nuremberg, he worked as organist at Fürth and his native Erfurt's Predigerkirche, before returning and taking the position at St. Jakob in 1706, shortly before his father's death. That same year J.S. Richter succeeded Johann Pachelbel at the city's largest church, Sebalduskirche; Wilhelm Hieronymus took Richter's former position at St. Egidienkirche. He remained in Nuremberg for the rest of his life, working at St. Egidien until 1719, when Richter died and Wilhelm Hieronymus was chosen to succeed him at Sebalduskirche.

Only seven pieces by Wilhelm Hieronymus survive, all of them for keyboard. While three show the influence of his father (the Toccata in G major, the chorale partita on "O Lamm Gottes, unschuldig", and the fugal prelude to Fantasia super Meine Seele, lass es gehen), in the remaining works Pachelbel shows a preference for technique that is harmonically and contrapuntally simpler, influenced by the emerging Classical style. Two such pieces were published by Pachelbel himself.

== List of works ==
- Prelude and Fugue in C major (published in Nuremberg, 1725)
- Prelude, Fugue, and Fantasia in D major (Nuremberg, possibly 1725, published as Musicalisches Vergnügen)
- Toccata in G major
- Fantasia in B-flat major
- Fantasia super Meine Seele, lass es gehen
- Chorale partita O Lamm Gottes unschuldig
- Fugue in F major

Maybe is BWV 923 a work of Pachelbel, some manuscripts give him as the composer (https://www.bach-digital.de/receive/BachDigitalWork_work_00001096)

== See also ==
- Johann Pachelbel
