= Johann Valentin Eckelt =

German baroque composer (1673–1732)

- Born: May 1673; Werningshausen, Electorate of Mainz, Holy Roman Empire
- Died: 18 December 1732 (aged 59); Sondershausen, Principality of Schwarzburg-Sondershausen, Holy Roman Empire
- Occupation: Organist

Johann Valentin Eckelt (May 1673 — 18 December 1732) was a German Baroque composer, organist, and music theorist. A pupil of the renowned Johann Pachelbel, Eckelt is remembered in his own right for his analytical writings about music and preservation of early compositions for the keyboard.

== Early life and career ==
Eckelt was born in Werningshausen near Erfurt in the Electorate of Mainz, today a municipality of Thuringia, Germany, and was orphaned at the age of nine. He pursued his education in Mainz and Erfurt before becoming a student of Pachelbel in 1690.

Eckelt first served as organist at Wernigerode in 1697 before his relocation to Sondershausen in 1701, residing there and serving as organist at the Lutheran Trinitatiskirche for the rest of his life.

=== Works ===
In his 1692 manuscript, The Tabulaturbuch, Eckelt compiled seventy-three pieces for the keyboard, including preludes, fugues, and choral settings. Lost during the Second World War and rediscovered in 1980s Poland, this document is a valuable source for Pachelbel's keyboard compositions, alongside those of Johann Jakob Froberger and Christian Friedrich Witt.

His compositions include hymns, organ preludes, etc., and a Passion for large orchestra. However, most of his original pieces are lost. Amongst the reputable pieces that have survived is his Ciaccona in C Major, containing sixty-one variations. Eckelt achieved larger fame via his didactic works. These were: Experimenta musicae geometrica (Erfurt, 1715), Instructions for Composing a Work (1722), and Compendium of What a Musician Needs to Know.

== Death ==
Eckelt died on 18 December 1732 in Sonderhausen, aged 59.

== Bibliography ==
- Volume 18 of the Enciclopedia universal ilustrada europeo-americana.
