= Ferdinand Tobias Richter =

Austrian composer and organist (1651–1711)

Ferdinand Tobias Richter (22 July 1651 – 3 November 1711) was a Baroque composer and organist from the Holy Roman Empire.

== Biography ==
Richter was born in Würzburg within the Holy Roman Empire. From 1675 to 1679 he served as organist at Heiligenkreuz Abbey in southern Austria. In 1683 he moved to Vienna to become court and chamber organist at the imperial court. In 1690 he was named first organist in the court chapel. He worked there until his death.

Richter's compositions include several toccatas, five suites and other pieces for keyboard. He also wrote music for a number of Jesuit school plays, operas and oratorios. His music shows a decided flair for the dramatic.

In 1699 Johann Pachelbel dedicated Hexachordum Apollinis, a collection including his famous Aria Sebaldina in F minor, to Dietrich Buxtehude and to his friend in Vienna, Ferdinand Tobias Richter.

Richter died, aged 60, in Vienna. His son Anton Karl Richter (1690-1763) was also court organist, serving from 1718 to 1751.
