= Alessandro Poglietti =

Italian composer

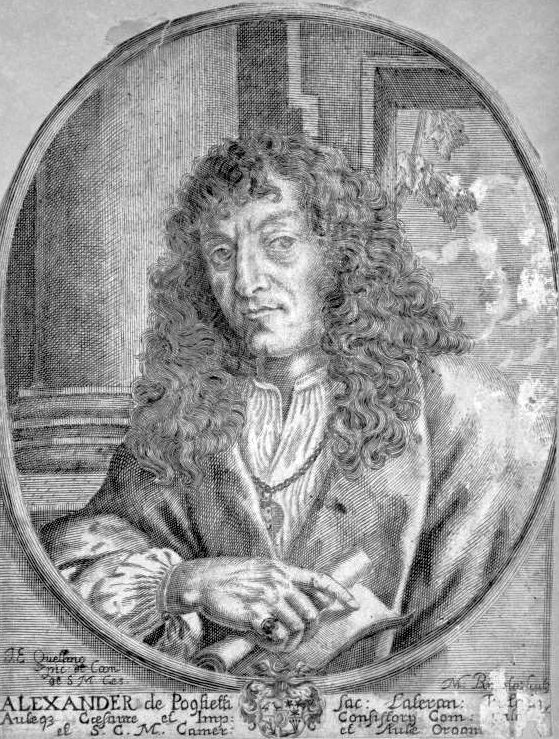
A late-17th-century engraving done after Jan-Erasmus Quellinus' portrait of Alessandro Poglietti (the original painting is lost).

Alessandro Poglietti (early 17th century – July 1683) was a Baroque organist and composer of unknown origin. In the second half of the 17th century Poglietti settled in Vienna, where he attained an extremely high reputation, becoming one of Leopold I's favorite composers. Poglietti held the post of court organist for 22 years from 1661 until his death during the Turkish siege that led into the Battle of Vienna.

Poglietti is primarily important for his keyboard music, particularly Rossignolo (1677), a collection of diverse pieces for harpsichord that includes a large number of imitations of natural sounds, and a collection of 12 ricercares, which was widely copied during his lifetime.

== Life ==
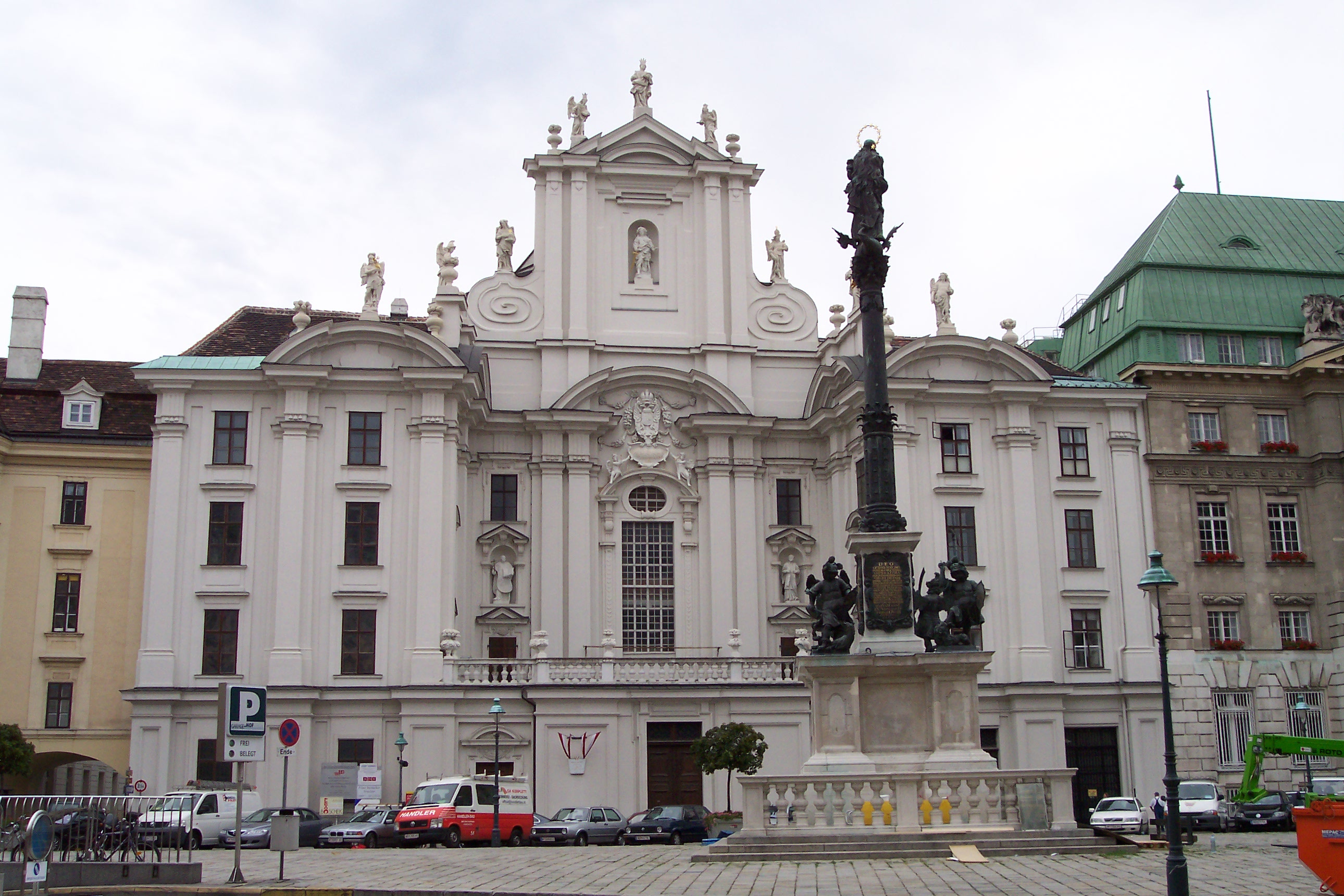
Kirche am Hof (or Zu den neun Chören der Engel), where Poglietti worked as organist from 1661.

Nothing is known of Poglietti's origins and early life. Tuscany and Bohemia have been suggested as his possible birthplace. He may have received musical training in Rome or Bologna. Towards the 1660s Poglietti settled in Vienna: in early 1661 he became organist and Kapellmeister at the Jesuit church Zu den neun Chören der Engel (Nine Choirs of Angels), and on 1 July 1661 he was appointed organist of the court Kapelle under Leopold I (a post previously held by none other than Johann Jakob Froberger).

Poglietti held the court position until his death and apparently enjoyed a high reputation. The Emperor (who was a composer himself) was particularly fond of Poglietti, ennobling him and bestowing upon him the title Comes palatinus Caesareus, and the composer was also favored by the Pope, who made him a Knight of the Golden Spur, i.e., a member of the second highest Order of Papal Orders of Chivalry. Poglietti also had friends among Austrian nobility, among them Count Anton Franz von Collalto and Karl II von Liechtenstein-Kastelkorn, Prince-Bishop of Olomouc—in 1672 Poglietti inherited estates near their residences. Another important connection of Poglietti's was with the Göttweig Benedictine Abbey, where he stayed as a guest a number of times, and where his only known opera was performed, in 1677. Composer Johann Kaspar Kerll was a personal friend of Poglietti's, and he may have known Johann Pachelbel, who visited Vienna in the mid-1670s.

Poglietti died in Vienna in July 1683, during the Turkish siege that eventually led into the Battle of Vienna. His death was lamented by Kerll in Missa in fletu solatium, published in Munich in 1689 as part of a collection of masses, Missae sex. Kerll's work includes continuo parts that specifically order the performer to "avoid consonances".

== Works ==
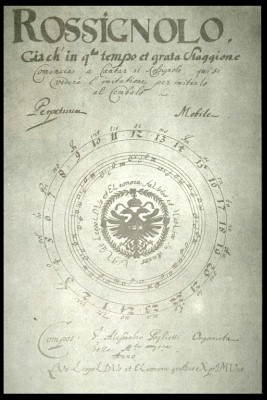
Title page of Rossignolo (1677).

Poglietti's importance lies primarily in his keyboard music. Together with Johann Kaspar Kerll, he represents the transitional period between the time of Frescobaldi and the late Baroque period. Particularly important are two large sets of pieces: an unpublished collection of twelve keyboard ricercares and Rossignolo (1677), a collection of harpsichord music. The ricercares belong to the tradition of Frescobaldi's Fiori musicali and Bach's The Art of Fugue. Models of the strict contrapuntal style, they were most probably intended for the organ, and were widely copied in the Vienna area. The Rossignolo pieces, on the other hand, are quite different. The collection, which Poglietti presented to Leopold I and his wife Eleonor Magdalene, comprises the following works:

- Toccata and Canzona
- A standard allemande—courante—sarabande—gigue suite in which every movement has a double (the allemande has two)
- An Aria Allemagna with 20 variations
- A set of pieces based on a single theme:
  - Ricercar per Il Rossignol
  - Sincopatione del Ricercar
  - Capriccio per Io Rossignol Sopra'l Ricercar
  - Aria bizarra del Rissignolo
  - Imitatione del medesimo Uccello

Many of these pieces employ programmatic devices. For example, Aria bizarra and Imitatione are very demanding, virtuosic pieces based on Poglietti's adaptation of nightingale calls. Many of the variations of Aria Allemagna imitate music for non-keyboard instruments (Variation 5 Lyra, Variation 11 Bayrische Schalmay, etc.) or foreign and/or folk traditions (Variation 15 Französische Baiselements). Poglietti's other pieces include more program music: a canzon and capriccio pair über das Henner und Hannengeschrey, in which the capriccio imitates hens and cocks, and the suite sopra la ribellione di Ungheria, which commemorates a Hungarian Protestant rebellion of 1671. Poglietti's suite musically illustrates the rebellion itself, the capture of the rebels, their execution, and closes with an imitation of church bells. Poglietti also provided numerous examples of program music (which were incipits of possible pieces) in his performance and composition treatise Compendium oder kurtzer Begriff (1676).

Numerous pieces contain highly original treatments of the form: movements of the Binder Gigue from an A minor suite begin with repeated chords and include octave triplets in the left hand; the toccatas as well as any other piece may feature rapid modulations to completely foreign keys, highly contrasting sections and sections built on various kinds of repetition.

Poglietti's other music includes chamber music (mostly suites and sonatas), sacred vocal works (masses, motets, Litaniae Lauretanae for two SATB choirs) and a single opera (Endimione festeggiante, 1677). Compendium oder kurtzer Begriff und Einführung zur Musica (1676) is a treatise on keyboard composition; a sketchbook survives which also serves as a guide to keyboard students.

== List of works ==
Aria Allemagna with 20 variations, from Rossignolo (1677)
Performed by Sylvia Kind on a harpsichord of the type made in the early 20th century

Canzona and Capriccio über das Henner und Hannengeschrey ("on Hen and Cocks")
Performed by Sylvia Kind on a harpsichord of the type made in the early 20th century

Toccatina, first movement of Suite sopra la ribellione di Ungheria (1671)
Performed by Sylvia Kind on a harpsichord of the type made in the early 20th century

=== Vocal ===
- Ave regina coelorum à 5
- Endimione festeggiante, opera (1677)
- Litaniae Lauretanae à 8
- Magnificat à 3
- Missa à 3, for 3vv, violin and basso continuo (1680)
- Missa à 4
- Missa à 5
- Requiem aeternam
- 2 motets

=== Keyboard ===
- Suite sopra la ribellione di Ungheria, 8 pieces (1671)
- Toccata fatta sopra l'assedio di Filippsburgo (1676; misspelled "Cassedio" in the source)
- Rossignolo, a suite of 17 pieces (1677)
- Canzon and Capriccio über das Henner und Hannengeschrey
- A collection of 12 ricercares
- Toccata del 7. tono
- numerous other pieces: suites, canzonas, capriccios, preludes and fugues, etc.

=== Other instrumental ===
- 8 sonatas, various balletti, all for string instruments

=== Writings ===
- Compendium oder kurtzer Begriff, und Einführung zur Musica (1676; includes a collection of keyboard pieces)
- Regulae compositionis, a sketchbook containing advice on composition
