= Johann Pachelbel =

German composer and organist (1653–1706)

- Born: Free Imperial City of Nuremberg, Holy Roman Empire
- Baptised: 11 September [O.S. 1 September] 1653
- Died: before 9 March 1706 (aged 52); Free Imperial City of Nuremberg, Holy Roman Empire
- Works: List of compositions
- Spouses: Barbara Gabler (m. 1681; died 1683); Judith Drommer (m. 1684)
- Children: 8, including Wilhelm Hieronymus, Amalia and Charles Theodore

Johann Pachelbel (Note: Pronounced /ˈpɑːkəlˌbɛl/ in English. The Duden Aussprachewörterbuch lists three possible German pronunciations for the surname: [ˈpaxɛlbl̩], [ˈpaxl̩bɛl], and [paˈxɛlbl̩]. Johann is pronounced [ˈjoːhan].) (also Bachelbel; baptised 11 September [O.S. 1 September] 1653 (Note: The date of Pachelbel's birth and death are unknown, therefore his baptismal and burial dates, which are known, are given. 1 September is the date in the Julian calendar in use in Nuremberg at the time. The corresponding Gregorian calendar date is 11 September.) – buried 9 March 1706) was a German composer, organist, and teacher who brought the south German organ schools to their peak. He composed a large body of sacred and secular music, and his contributions to the development of the chorale prelude and fugue have earned him a place among the most important composers of the middle Baroque era.

Pachelbel's music enjoyed enormous popularity during his lifetime; he had many pupils and his music became a model for the composers of south and central Germany. Today, Pachelbel is best known for the Canon in D; other well known works include the Chaconne in F minor, the Toccata in E minor for organ, and the Hexachordum Apollinis, a set of keyboard variations.

He was influenced by southern German composers, such as Johann Jakob Froberger and Johann Caspar Kerll, Italians such as Girolamo Frescobaldi and Alessandro Poglietti, French composers, and the composers of the Nuremberg tradition. He preferred a lucid, uncomplicated contrapuntal style that emphasized melodic and harmonic clarity. His music is less virtuosic and less adventurous harmonically than that of Dieterich Buxtehude, although, like Buxtehude, Pachelbel experimented with different ensembles and instrumental combinations in his chamber music and, most importantly, his vocal music, much of which features exceptionally rich instrumentation. Pachelbel explored many variation forms and associated techniques, which manifest themselves in various diverse pieces, from sacred concertos to harpsichord suites.

== Life ==
=== 1653–1674: Early youth and education (Nuremberg, Altdorf, Regensburg) ===
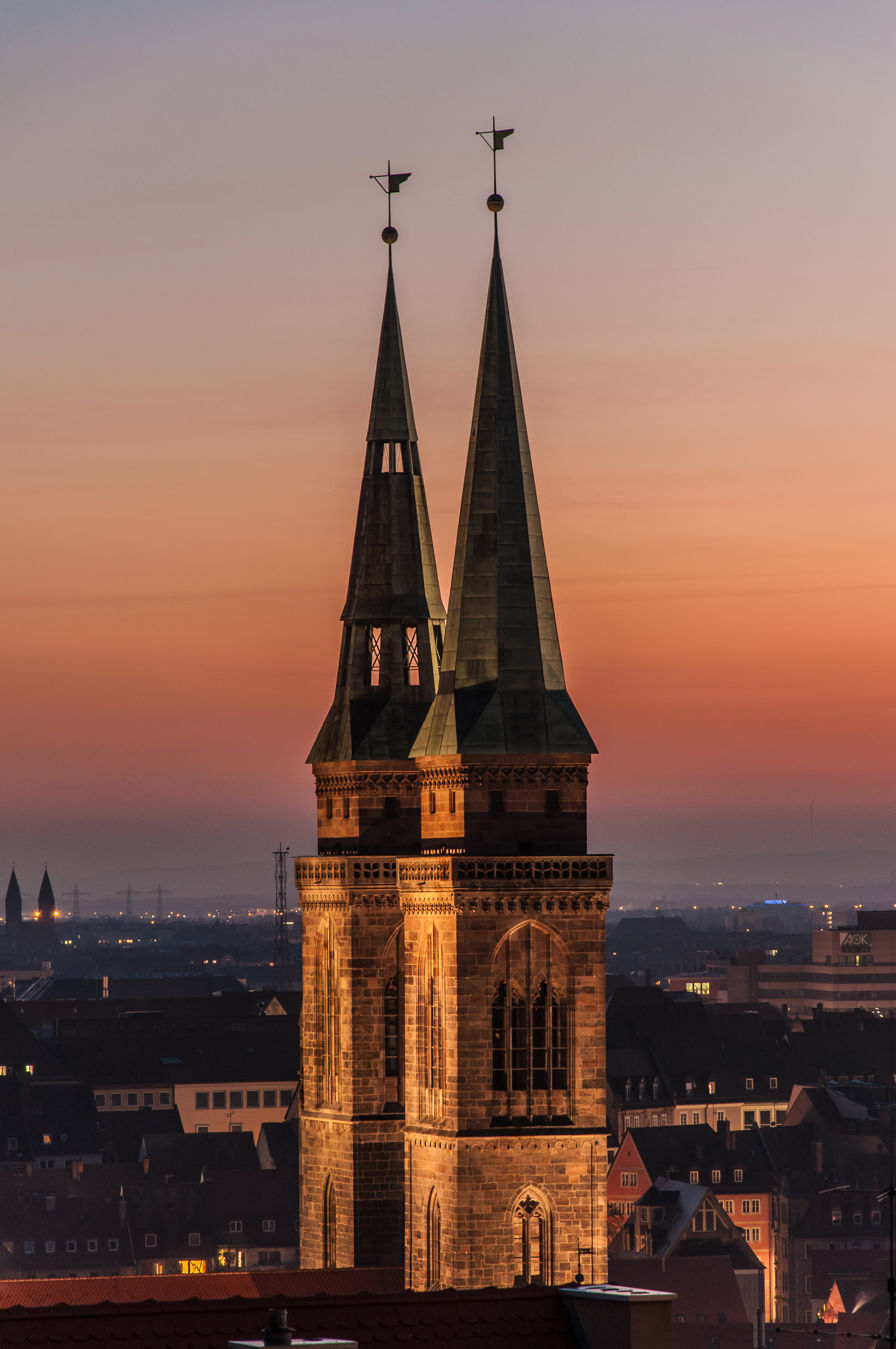
St. Sebaldus Church, Nuremberg, which played an important role in Pachelbel's life

Johann Pachelbel was born in 1653 in Nuremberg into a middle-class family, son of Johann (Hans) Pachelbel (born 1613 in Wunsiedel, Germany), a wine dealer, and his second wife Anna (Anne) Maria Mair. The exact date of Johann's birth is unknown, but he was baptized on 1 September. Among his many siblings was an older brother, Johann Matthäus (1644–1710), who served as Kantor in Feuchtwangen, near Nuremberg.

During his early youth, Pachelbel received musical training from Heinrich Schwemmer, who later became the cantor of St. Sebaldus Church (Sebalduskirche). Some sources indicate that Pachelbel also studied with Georg Caspar Wecker, organist of the same church and an important composer of the Nuremberg school, but this is now considered unlikely. (Note: See also Johann Mattheson's Pulpit Obituary of 1740, where Mattheson specifically addresses this claim and gives reasons as to why it is not true. Walther's biography, published in 1732, is the only source to state that Pachelbel studied with Wecker; there is no direct evidence for that.) In any case, both Wecker and Schwemmer were trained by Johann Erasmus Kindermann, one of the founders of the Nuremberg musical tradition, who had been at one time a pupil of Johann Staden.

Johann Mattheson, whose Grundlage einer Ehrenpforte (Hamburg, 1740) is one of the most important sources of information about Pachelbel's life, mentions that the young Pachelbel demonstrated exceptional musical and academic abilities. He received his primary education in St. Lorenz Hauptschule and the Auditorio Aegediano in Nuremberg, then on 29 June 1669, he became a student at the University of Altdorf, where he was also appointed organist of St. Lorenz church the same year. Financial difficulties forced Pachelbel to leave the university after less than a year. In order to complete his studies, he became a scholarship student, in 1670, at the Gymnasium Poeticum at Regensburg. The school authorities were so impressed by Pachelbel's academic qualifications that he was admitted above the school's normal quota.

Pachelbel was also permitted to study music outside the Gymnasium. His teacher was Kaspar (Caspar) Prentz, once a student of Johann Caspar Kerll. Since the latter was greatly influenced by Italian composers such as Giacomo Carissimi, it is likely through Prentz that Pachelbel started developing an interest in contemporary Italian music, and Catholic church music in general.

=== 1673–1690: Career (Vienna, Eisenach, Erfurt) ===
Prentz left for Eichstätt in 1672. This period of Pachelbel's life is the least documented one, so it is unknown whether he stayed in Regensburg until 1673 or left the same year his teacher did; at any rate, by 1673 Pachelbel was living in Vienna, where he became a deputy organist at the Saint Stephen Cathedral. At the time, Vienna was the center of the vast Habsburg empire and had much cultural importance; its tastes in music were predominantly Italian. Several renowned cosmopolitan composers worked there, many of them contributing to the exchange of musical traditions in Europe. In particular, Johann Jakob Froberger served as court organist in Vienna until 1657 and was succeeded by Alessandro Poglietti. Georg Muffat lived in the city for some time, and, most importantly, Johann Caspar Kerll moved to Vienna in 1673. While there, he may have known or even taught Pachelbel, whose music shows traces of Kerll's style. Pachelbel spent five years in Vienna, absorbing the music of Catholic composers from southern Germany and Italy. In some respects, Pachelbel is similar to Haydn, who too served as a professional musician of the Stephansdom in his youth and as such was exposed to music of the leading composers of the time. Although he was a Lutheran, his works were influenced by Catholic music.

In 1677, Pachelbel moved to Eisenach, where he found employment as court organist under Kapellmeister Daniel Eberlin (also a native of Nuremberg), in the employ of Johann Georg I, Duke of Saxe-Eisenach. He met members of the Bach family in Eisenach (which was the home city of J. S. Bach's father, Johann Ambrosius Bach), and became a close friend of Johann Ambrosius and tutor to his children. However, Pachelbel spent only one year in Eisenach. In 1678, Bernhard II, Duke of Saxe-Jena, Johann Georg's brother, died and during the period of mourning court musicians were greatly curtailed. Pachelbel was left unemployed. He requested a testimonial from Eberlin, who wrote one for him, describing Pachelbel as a 'perfect and rare virtuoso' – einen perfekten und raren Virtuosen. With this document, Pachelbel left Eisenach on 18 May 1678.

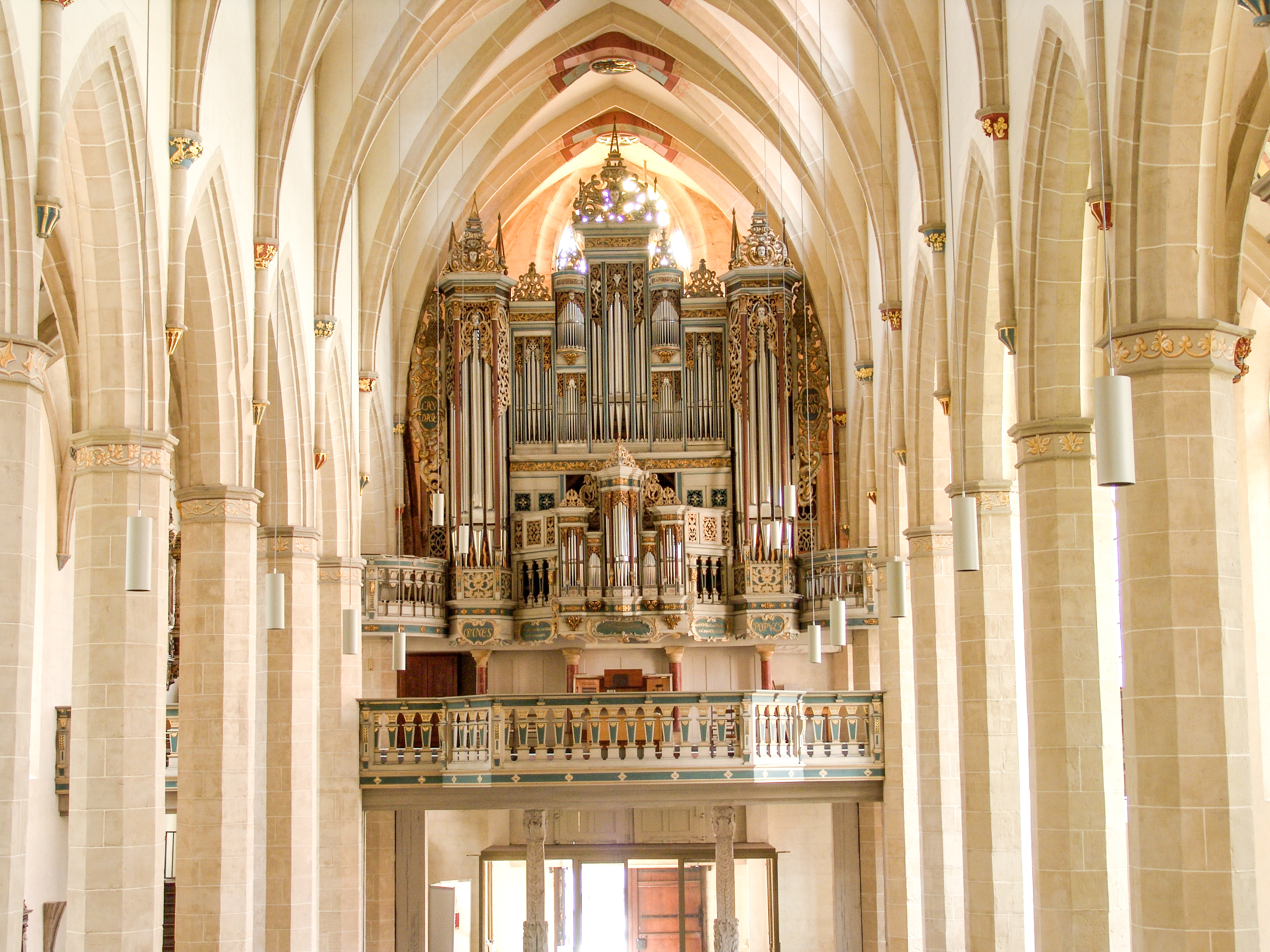
Predigerkirche, the Erfurt church, where Pachelbel worked for 12 years, starting in 1678

In June 1678, Pachelbel was employed as organist of the Predigerkirche in Erfurt, succeeding Johann Effler (c. 1640–1711; Effler later preceded Johann Sebastian Bach in Weimar). The Bach family was very well known in Erfurt (where virtually all organists would later be called "Bachs"), so Pachelbel's friendship with them continued here. Pachelbel became godfather to Johann Ambrosius' daughter, Johanna Juditha, taught Johann Christoph Bach (1671–1721), Johann Sebastian's eldest brother, and lived in Johann Christian Bach's (1640–1682) house. Pachelbel remained in Erfurt for 12 years and established his reputation as one of the leading German organ composers of the time during his stay. The chorale prelude became one of his most characteristic products of the Erfurt period, since Pachelbel's contract specifically required him to compose the preludes for church services. (Note: For the discussion of the contract in question, see Nolte 1957, p. xlviii. The text of the contract is also given in Welter 1998, pp. 27–29, and Botstiber's introduction to DTÖ, xvii, Jg.viii/2 (1901/R).) His duties also included organ maintenance and, more importantly, composing a large-scale work every year to demonstrate his progress as composer and organist, as every work of that kind had to be better than the one composed the year before.

Johann Christian Bach (1640–1682), Pachelbel's landlord in Erfurt, died in 1682. In June 1684, Pachelbel purchased the house (called Zur silbernen Tasche, now Junkersand 1) from Johann Christian's widow. In 1686, he was offered a position as organist of the St. Trinitatis church (Trinitatiskirche) in Sondershausen. Pachelbel initially accepted the invitation but, as a surviving letter indicates, had to reject the offer after a long series of negotiations: it appears that he was required to consult with Erfurt's elders and church authorities before considering any job offers. It seems that the situation had been resolved quietly and without harm to Pachelbel's reputation; he was offered a raise and stayed in the city for four more years.

Pachelbel married twice during his stay in Erfurt. Barbara Gabler, daughter of the Stadt-Major of Erfurt, became his first wife, on 25 October 1681. The marriage took place in the house of the bride's father. Both Barbara and their only son died in October 1683 during a plague. Pachelbel's first published work, a set of chorale variations called Musicalische Sterbens-Gedancken ("Musical Thoughts on Death", Erfurt, 1683), was probably influenced by this event.

Ten months later, Pachelbel married Judith Drommer (Trummert), daughter of a coppersmith, on 24 August 1684. They had five sons and two daughters. Two of the sons, Wilhelm Hieronymus Pachelbel and Charles Theodore Pachelbel, also became organ composers; the latter moved to the American colonies in 1734. Another son, Johann Michael, became an instrument maker in Nuremberg and traveled as far as London and Jamaica. One of the daughters, Amalia Pachelbel, achieved recognition as a painter and engraver.

=== 1690–1706: Final years (Stuttgart, Gotha, Nuremberg) ===
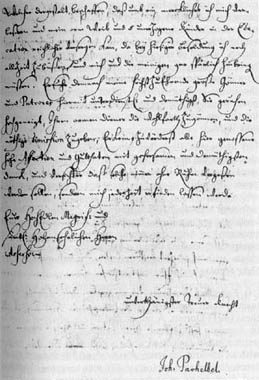
Pachelbel's letter

Although Pachelbel was an outstandingly successful organist, composer, and teacher at Erfurt, he asked permission to leave, apparently seeking a better appointment, and was formally released on 15 August 1690, bearing a testimonial praising his diligence and fidelity.

He was employed in less than a fortnight: from 1 September 1690, he was a musician-organist in the Württemberg court at Stuttgart under the patronage of Duchess Magdalena Sibylla. That job was better, but, unfortunately, he lived there only two years before fleeing the French attacks of the War of the Grand Alliance. His next job was in Gotha as the town organist, a post he occupied for two years, starting on 8 November 1692; there he published his first, and only, liturgical music collection: Acht Chorale zum Praeambulieren in 1693 (Erster Theil etlicher Choräle).

When former pupil Johann Christoph Bach married in October 1694, the Bach family celebrated the marriage on 23 October 1694 in Ohrdruf, and invited him and other composers to provide the music; he probably attended—if so, it was the only time Johann Sebastian Bach, then nine years old, met Johann Pachelbel.

In his three years in Gotha, he was twice offered positions, in Germany at Stuttgart and in England at Oxford University; he declined both. Meanwhile, in Nuremberg, when the St. Sebaldus Church organist Georg Caspar Wecker (and his possible former teacher) died on 20 April 1695, the city authorities were so anxious to appoint Pachelbel (then a famous Nuremberger) to the position that they officially invited him to assume it without holding the usual job examination or inviting applications from prominent organists from lesser churches. He accepted, was released from Gotha in 1695, and arrived in Nuremberg in summer, with the city council paying his per diem expenses.

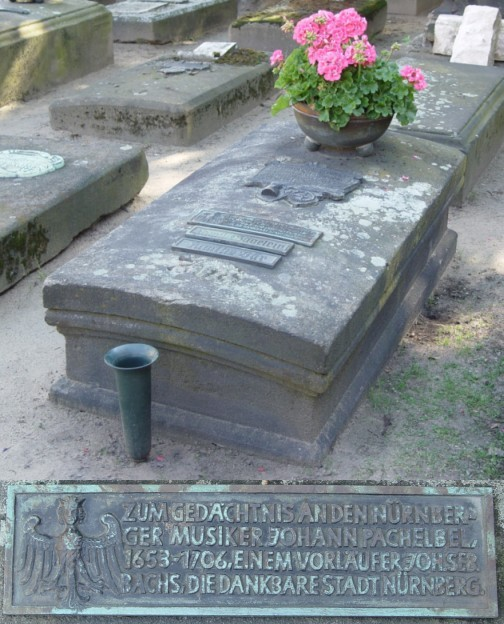
Pachelbel's tomb at the St. Rochus Cemetery in Nuremberg (Note: The inscription reads: "Zum Gedächtnis an den Nürnberger Musiker Johann Pachelbel, 1653–1706, einem Vorläufer Joh. Seb. Bachs, die dankbare Stadt Nürnberg." [In memory of Nuremberg musician Johann Pachelbel, 1653–1706, a forerunner of Johann Sebastian Bach, the grateful city of Nuremberg.])

Pachelbel lived the rest of his life in Nuremberg, during which he published the chamber music collection Musicalische Ergötzung, and, most importantly, the Hexachordum Apollinis (Nuremberg, 1699), a set of six keyboard arias with variations. Though most influenced by Italian and southern German composers, he knew the northern German school, because he dedicated the Hexachordum Apollinis to Dieterich Buxtehude. Also composed in the final years were Italian-influenced concertato Vespers and a set of more than ninety Magnificat fugues.

Johann Pachelbel died at the age of 52, in early March 1706, and was buried on 9 March; Mattheson cites either 3 March or 7 March 1706 as the death date, yet it is unlikely that the corpse was allowed to linger unburied as long as six days. Contemporary custom was to bury the dead on the third or fourth post-mortem day; so, either 6 or 7 March 1706 is a likelier death date. He is buried in the St. Rochus Cemetery, a Protestant cemetery.

== Works ==
Apart from harpsichord suites, this section concentrates only on the works whose ascription is not questioned. For a complete list of works which includes pieces with questionable authorship and lost compositions, see List of compositions by Johann Pachelbel.

During his lifetime, Pachelbel was best known as an organ composer. He wrote more than two hundred pieces for the instrument, both liturgical and secular, and explored most of the genres that existed at the time. Pachelbel was also a prolific vocal music composer: around a hundred of such works survive, including some 40 large-scale works. Only a few chamber music pieces by Pachelbel exist, although he might have composed many more, particularly while serving as court musician in Eisenach and Stuttgart.

Several principal sources exist for Pachelbel's music, although none of them as important as, for example, the Oldham manuscript is for Louis Couperin. Among the more significant materials are several manuscripts that were lost before and during World War II but partially available as microfilms of the Winterthur collection, a two-volume manuscript currently in possession of the Oxford Bodleian Library which is a major source for Pachelbel's late work, and the first part of the Tabulaturbuch (1692, currently at the Biblioteka Jagiellońska in Kraków) compiled by Pachelbel's pupil Johann Valentin Eckelt, which includes the only known Pachelbel autographs). The Neumeister Collection and the so-called Weimar tablature of 1704 provide valuable information about Pachelbel's school, although they do not contain any pieces that can be confidently ascribed to him.

Currently, there is no standard numbering system for Pachelbel's works. Several catalogues are used, by Antoine Bouchard (POP numbers, organ works only), Jean M. Perreault (P numbers, currently the most complete catalogue; organized alphabetically), Hideo Tsukamoto (T numbers, L for lost works; organized thematically) and Kathryn Jane Welter (PC numbers).

=== Keyboard music ===
Much of Pachelbel's liturgical organ music, particularly the chorale preludes, is relatively simple and written for manuals only: no pedal is required. This is partly due to Lutheran religious practice where congregants sang the chorales. Household instruments like virginals or clavichords accompanied the singing, so Pachelbel and many of his contemporaries made music playable using these instruments. The quality of the organs Pachelbel used also played a role: south German instruments were not, as a rule, as complex and as versatile as the north German ones, and Pachelbel's organs must have only had around 15 to 25 stops on two manuals (compare to Buxtehude's Marienkirche instrument with 52 stops, 15 of them in the pedal). Finally, neither the Nuremberg nor the southern German organ tradition endorsed extensive use of pedals seen in the works by composers of the northern German school.

Only two volumes of Pachelbel's organ music were published and distributed during his lifetime: Musikalische Sterbens-Gedancken (Musical Thoughts on Death; Erfurt, 1683) – a set of chorale variations in memory of his deceased wife and child, and Acht Choräle (Nuremberg, 1693). Pachelbel employed white mensural notation when writing out numerous compositions (several chorales, all ricercars, some fantasias); a notational system that uses hollow note heads and omits bar lines (measure delimiters). The system had been widely used since the 15th century but was gradually being replaced in this period by modern notation (sometimes called black notation).

==== Chorale preludes ====
Chorale preludes constitute almost half of Pachelbel's surviving organ works, in part because of his Erfurt job duties which required him to compose chorale preludes on a regular basis. The models Pachelbel used most frequently are the three-part cantus firmus setting, the chorale fugue and, most importantly, a model he invented which combined the two types. This latter type begins with a brief chorale fugue that is followed by a three- or four-part cantus firmus setting. Chorale phrases are treated one at a time, in the order in which they occur; frequently, the accompanying voices anticipate the next phrase by using bits of the melody in imitative counterpoint. An example from Wenn mein Stündlein vorhanden ist:

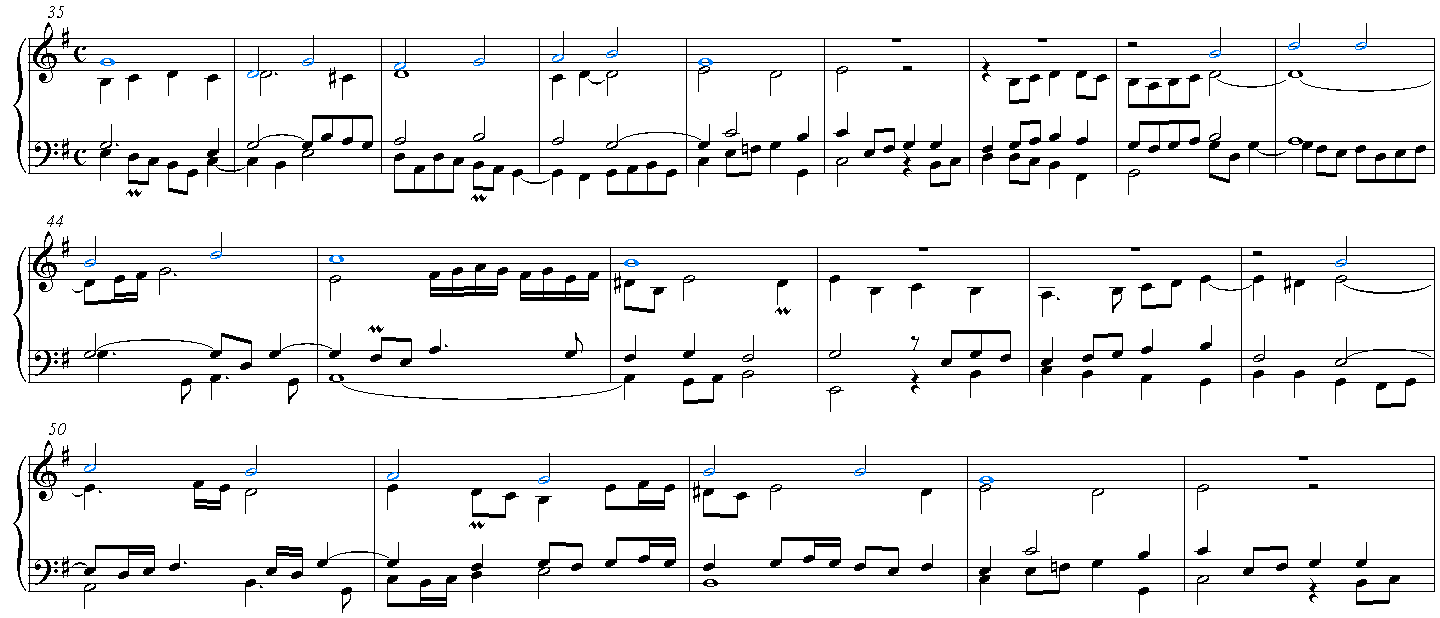
Example from "Wenn mein Stündlein vorhanden ist" of Pachelbel's chorales, bars 35–54. The chorale in the soprano is highlighted.

The piece begins with a chorale fugue (not shown here) that turns into a four-part chorale setting which starts at bar 35. The slow-moving chorale (the cantus firmus, i.e., the original hymn tune) is in the soprano, and is highlighted in blue. The lower voices anticipate the shape of the second phrase of the chorale in an imitative fashion (notice the distinctive pattern of two repeated notes). Pachelbel wrote numerous chorales using this model ("Auf meinen lieben Gott", "Ach wie elend ist unsre Zeit", "Wenn mein Stündlein vorhanden ist", etc.), which soon became a standard form.

A distinctive feature of almost all of Pachelbel's chorale preludes is his treatment of the melody: the cantus firmus features virtually no figuration or ornamentation of any kind, always presented in the plainest possible way in one of the outer voices. Pachelbel's knowledge of both ancient and contemporary chorale techniques is reflected in Acht Choräle zum Praeambulieren, a collection of eight chorales he published in 1693. It included, among other types, several chorales written using outdated models. Of these, "Nun lob, mein Seel, den Herren" is based on the hymn by Johann Gramann, a paraphrase of Psalm 103; it is one of the very few Pachelbel chorales with cantus firmus in the tenor. "Wir glauben all an einen Gott" is a three-part setting with melodic ornamentation of the chorale melody, which Pachelbel employed very rarely. Finally, "Jesus Christus, unser Heiland der von uns" is a typical bicinium chorale with one of the hands playing the unadorned chorale while the other provides constant fast-paced accompaniment written mostly in sixteenth notes.

Nun komm der Heiden Heiland
Performed on a church organ in Trubschachen, Switzerland by Burghard Fischer

Ach Gott vom Himmel, sieh darein

==== Fugues ====
Pachelbel wrote more than one hundred fugues on free themes. These fall into two categories: some 30 free fugues and around 90 of the so-called Magnificat Fugues. His fugues are usually based on non-thematic material, and are shorter than the later model (of which those of J. S. Bach are a prime example). The contrapuntal devices of stretto, diminution and inversion are very rarely employed in any of them. Nevertheless, Pachelbel's fugues display a tendency towards a more unified, subject-dependent structure which was to become the key element of late Baroque fugues. Given the number of fugues he composed and the extraordinary variety of subjects he used, Pachelbel is regarded as one of the key composers in the evolution of the form. He was also the first major composer to pair a fugue with a preludial movement (a toccata or a prelude) – this technique was adopted by later composers and was used extensively by J. S. Bach.

The Magnificat Fugues were all composed during Pachelbel's final years in Nuremberg. The singing of the Magnificat at Vespers was usually accompanied by the organist, and earlier composers provided examples of Magnificat settings for organ, based on themes from the chant. Pachelbel's fugues, however, are almost all based on free themes and it is not yet understood exactly where they fit during the service. It is possible that they served to help singers establish pitch, or simply act as introductory pieces played before the beginning of the service. There are 95 pieces extant, covering all eight church modes: 23 in primi toni, 10 in secundi toni, 11 in tertii toni, 8 in quarti toni, 12 in quinti toni, 10 in sexti toni, 8 in septimi toni and 13 in octavi toni. Although a few two- and four-voice works are present, most employ three voices (sometimes expanding to four-voice polyphony for a bar or two). With the exception of the three double fugues (primi toni No. 12, sexti toni No. 1 and octavi toni No. 8), all are straightforward pieces, frequently in common time and comparatively short – at an average tempo, most take around a minute and a half to play.

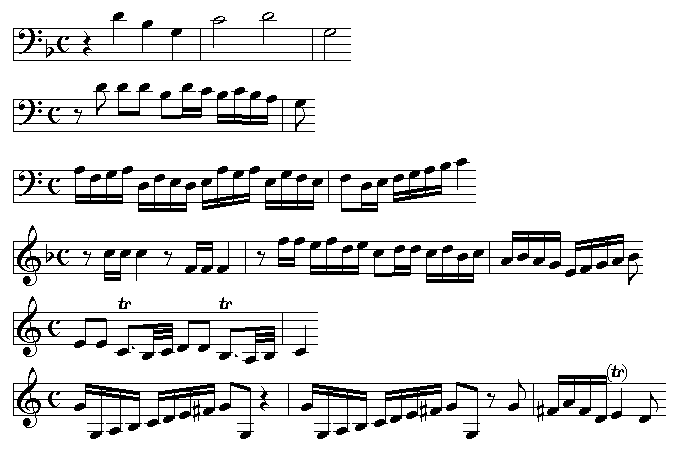
Fugue subjects from Magnificat fugues: secundi toni 7, octavi toni 10, primi toni 16, sexti toni 10, quarti toni 8 and octavi toni 13

Although most of them are brief, the subjects are extremely varied (see Example 1). Frequently some form of note repetition is used to emphasize a rhythmic (rather than melodic) contour. Many feature a dramatic leap (up to an octave), which may or may not be mirrored in one of the voices sometime during an episode – a characteristic Pachelbel technique, although it was also employed by earlier composers, albeit less pronounced. Minor alterations to the subject between the entries are observed in some of the fugues, and simple countersubjects occur several times. An interesting technique employed in many of the pieces is an occasional resort to style brisé for a few bars, both during episodes and in codas. The double fugues exhibit a typical three-section structure: fugue on subject 1, fugue on subject 2, and the counterpoint with simultaneous use of both subjects.

A typical Pachelbel repercussion subject.

Most of Pachelbel's free fugues are in three or four voices, with the notable exception of two bicinia pieces. Pachelbel frequently used repercussion subjects of different kinds, with note repetition sometimes extended to span a whole measure (such as in the subject of a G minor fugue, see illustration). Some of the fugues employ textures more suited for the harpsichord, particularly those with broken chord figuration. The three ricercars Pachelbel composed, that are more akin to his fugues than to ricercars by Frescobaldi or Froberger, are perhaps more technically interesting. In the original sources, all three use white notation and are marked alla breve. The polythematic C minor ricercar is the most popular and frequently performed and recorded. It is built on two contrasting themes (a slow chromatic pattern and a lively simplistic motif) that appear in their normal and inverted forms and concludes with both themes appearing simultaneously. The F♯ minor ricercar uses the same concept and is slightly more interesting musically: the key of F♯ minor requires a more flexible tuning than the standard meantone temperament of the Baroque era and was therefore rarely used by contemporary composers. This means that Pachelbel may have used his own tuning system, of which little is known. Ricercare in C major is mostly in three voices and employing the same kind of writing with consecutive thirds as seen in Pachelbel's toccatas (see below).

Pachelbel's use of repercussion subjects and extensive repeated note passages may be regarded as another characteristic feature of his organ pieces. Extreme examples of note repetition in the subject are found in magnificat fugues: quarti toni No. 4 has eight repeated notes, octavi toni No. 6 has twelve. (Note: The most extraordinary example of note repetition, however, is not found in Pachelbel's fugues but in his first setting of the Vom Himmel hoch chorale, where a string of 30 repeated 16th-notes occurs in bars 15 and 16) Also, even a fugue with an ordinary subject can rely on strings of repeated notes, as it happens, for example, in magnificat fugue octavi toni No. 12:

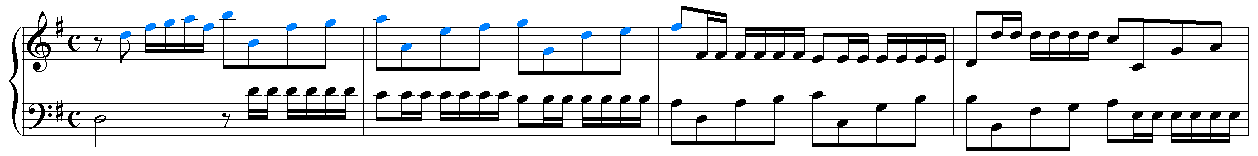
Excerpt from Magnificat Fugue octavi toni No. 12 (bars 15–18). Fugue subject that appears once in this excerpt is highlighted.

Fugue in C major for organ
One of Pachelbel's many C major fugues on original themes, this short piece uses a subject with a pattern of repeated notes in a manner discussed above.

==== Chaconnes and variations ====
Pachelbel's apparent affinity for variation form is evident from his organ works that explore the genre: chaconnes, chorale variations and several sets of arias with variations. The six chaconnes, together with Buxtehude's ostinato organ works, represent a shift from the older chaconne style: they completely abandon the dance idiom, introduce contrapuntal density, employ miscellaneous chorale improvisation techniques, and, most importantly, give the bass line much thematic significance for the development of the piece. Pachelbel's chaconnes are distinctly south German in style; the duple meter C major chaconne (possibly an early work) is reminiscent of Kerll's D minor passacaglia. The remaining five works are all in triple meter and display a wide variety of moods and techniques, concentrating on melodic content (as opposed to the emphasis on harmonic complexity and virtuosity in Buxtehude's chaconnes). The ostinato bass is not necessarily repeated unaltered throughout the piece and is sometimes subjected to minor alterations and ornamentation. The D major, D minor and F minor chaconnes are among Pachelbel's best-known organ pieces, and the latter is often cited as his best organ work.

Chaconne in F minor for organ
Performed on a church organ in Trubschachen, Switzerland by Burghard Fischer

Chaconne in F minor for organ
Played by Tibor Pinter on the sample set of the Marcussen organ, Moerdijk, Netherlands.

Chaconne in D minor for organ
Played by Tibor Pinter on the sample set of Gottfried Silbermann's organ (1722) in Roetha, Germany

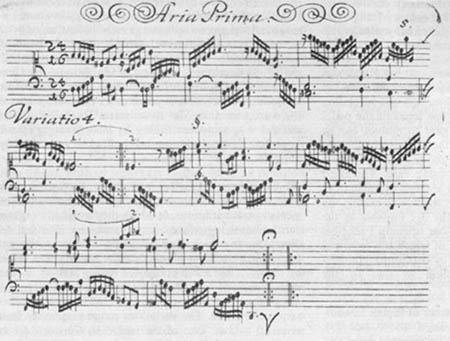
A page from the original printed edition of Hexachordum Apollinis, showing the fourth variation of the first aria

In 1699 Pachelbel published Hexachordum Apollinis (the title is a reference to Apollo's lyre), a collection of six variations set in different keys. It is dedicated to composers Ferdinand Tobias Richter (a friend from the Vienna years) and Dieterich Buxtehude. Each set follows the "aria and variations" model, arias numbered Aria prima through Aria sexta ("first" through "sixth"). The final piece, which is also the best-known today, is subtitled Aria Sebaldina, a reference to St. Sebaldus Church where Pachelbel worked at the time. Most of the variations are in common time, with Aria Sebaldina and its variations being the only notable exceptions; they are in 3/4 time. The pieces explore a wide range of variation techniques.

Aria Quinta for organ
The fifth aria from Hexachordum Apollinis (1699) played by Tibor Pinter on the sample set of the organ in Smecno, Czech Republic, built ca. 1587

Aria Sexta for organ
The sixth aria (Aria Sebaldina) from Hexachordum Apollinis (1699) played by Tibor Pinter on the sample set of the organ in Zlata Koruna, Czech Republic, built 1699

Pachelbel's other variation sets include a few arias and an arietta (a short aria) with variations and a few pieces designated as chorale variations. Four works of the latter type were published in Erfurt in 1683 under the title Musicalische Sterbens-Gedancken ("Musical Thoughts on Death"), which might refer to the death of Pachelbel's first wife that occurred in the same year. This was Pachelbel's first published work and it is now partially lost. These pieces, along with Georg Böhm's works, may or may not have influenced Johann Sebastian Bach's early organ partitas.

==== Toccatas ====
About 20 toccatas by Pachelbel survive, including several brief pieces referred to as toccatinas in the Perreault catalogue. They are characterized by consistent use of pedal point: for the most part, Pachelbel's toccatas consist of relatively fast passagework in both hands over sustained pedal notes. Although a similar technique is employed in toccatas by Froberger and Frescobaldi's pedal toccatas, Pachelbel distinguishes himself from these composers by having no sections with imitative counterpoint–in fact, unlike most toccatas from the early and middle Baroque periods, Pachelbel's contributions to the genre are not sectional, unless rhapsodic introductory passages in a few pieces (most notably the E minor toccata) are counted as separate sections. Furthermore, no other Baroque composer used pedal point with such consistency in toccatas.

Many of Pachelbel's toccatas explore a single melodic motif, and later works are written in a simple style in which two voices interact over sustained pedal notes, and said interaction – already much simpler than the virtuosic passages in earlier works – sometimes resorts to consecutive thirds, sixths or tenths. Compare the earlier D major toccata, with passages in the typical middle Baroque style, with one of the late C major toccatas:

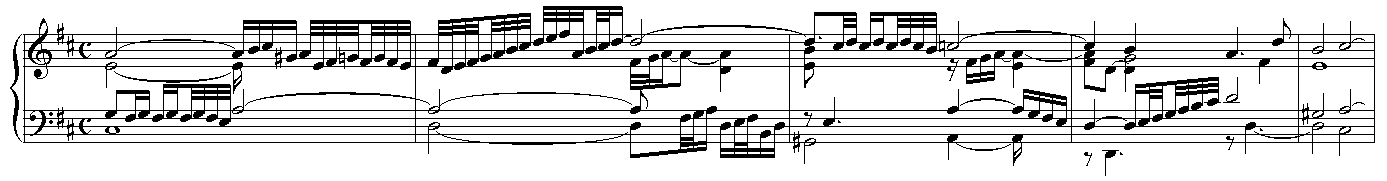
Excerpt from Toccata in D major (bars 10–14).

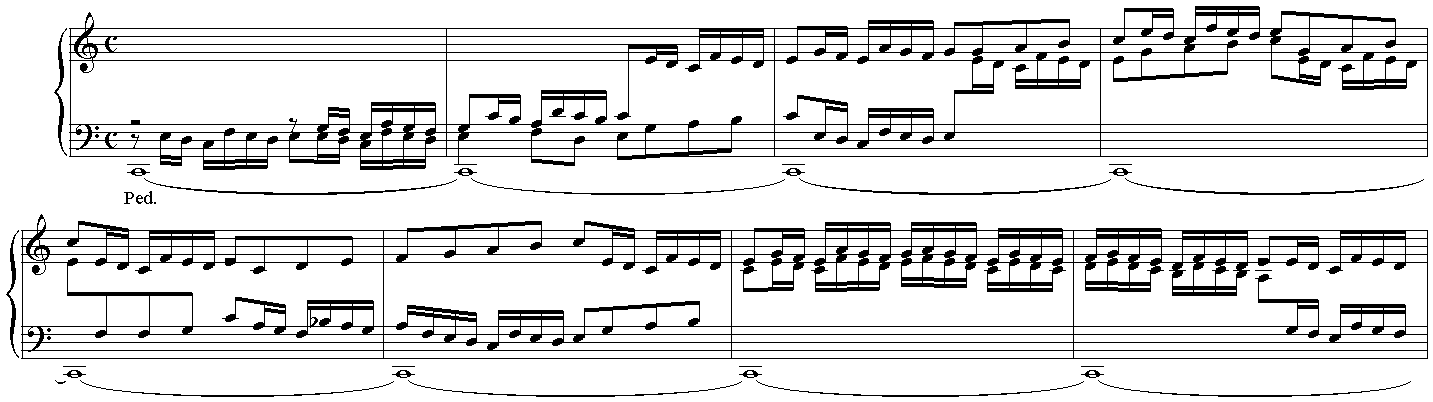
Opening bars of Toccata in C major. Two-voice motivic interplay, based on the melody introduced in the first bar, is reduced to consecutive thirds in the last two bars. The piece continues in a similar manner, with basic motivic interaction in two voices and occasional consecutive thirds or sixths.

Toccata in E minor

Toccata in F major
Both performed on a church organ in Trubschachen, Switzerland, by Burghard Fischer

Sometimes a bar or two of consecutive thirds embellish the otherwise more complex toccata-occasionally there is a whole section written in that manner; and a few toccatas (particularly one of the D minor and one of the G minor pieces) are composed using only this technique, with almost no variation. Partly due to their simplicity, the toccatas are very accessible works; however, the E minor and C minor ones which receive more attention than the rest are in fact slightly more complex.

==== Fantasias ====
Pachelbel composed six fantasias. Three of them (the A minor, C major and one of the two D Dorian pieces) are sectional compositions in 3/2 time; the sections are never connected thematically; the other D Dorian piece's structure is reminiscent of Pachelbel's magnificat fugues, with the main theme accompanied by two simple countersubjects.

The E♭ major and G minor fantasias are variations on the Italian toccata di durezze e ligature genre. Both are gentle free-flowing pieces featuring intricate passages in both hands with many accidentals, close to similar pieces by Girolamo Frescobaldi or Giovanni de Macque.

==== Preludes ====
Almost all pieces designated as preludes resemble Pachelbel's toccatas closely, since they too feature virtuosic passagework in one or both hands over sustained notes. However, most of the preludes are much shorter than the toccatas: the A minor prelude (pictured below) only has 9 bars, the G major piece has 10. The only exception is one of the two D minor pieces, which is very similar to Pachelbel's late simplistic toccatas, and considerably longer than any other prelude. The toccata idiom is completely absent, however, in the short Prelude in A minor:

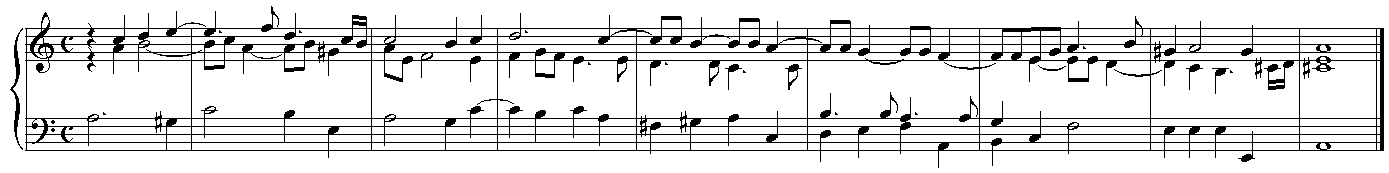
Prelude in A minor (full score)

Prelude in A minor

A texture of similar density is also found in the ending of the shorter D minor piece, where three voices engage in imitative counterpoint. In pairs of preludes and fugues Pachelbel aimed to separate homophonic, improvisatory texture of the prelude from the strict counterpoint of the fugue.

==== Other keyboard music ====
Around 20 dance suites transmitted in a 1683 manuscript (now destroyed) were previously attributed to Pachelbel, but today his authorship is questioned for all but three suites, numbers 29, 32 and 33B in the Seiffert edition. (Note: For a discussion of the suites' authorship, see Perreault's "An Essay on the Authorities" (in Perreault 2004, pp. 252–253).) The pieces are clearly not without French influence (but not so much as Buxtehude's) and are comparable in terms of style and technique to Froberger's suites. Seventeen keys are used, including F♯ minor. Number 29 has all four traditional movements, the other two authentic pieces only have three (no gigue), and the rest follow the classical model (Allemande, Courante, Sarabande, Gigue), sometimes updated with an extra movement (usually less developed), a more modern dance such as a gavotte or a ballet. All movements are in binary form, except for two arias.

=== Chamber music ===
Pachelbel's chamber music is much less virtuosic than Biber's Mystery Sonatas or Buxtehude's Opus 1 and Opus 2 chamber sonatas. The famous Canon in D belongs to this genre, as it was originally scored for 3 violins and a basso continuo, and paired with a gigue in the same key. The canon shares an important quality with the chaconne and passacaglia: it consists of a ground bass over which the violins play a three-voice canon based on a simple theme, the violins' parts form 28 variations of the melody. The gigue which originally accompanied the canon is a simple piece that uses strict fugal writing.

Musicalische Ergötzung ("Musical Delight") is a set of six chamber suites for two scordatura violins and basso continuo published sometime after 1695. At the time, scordatura tuning was used to produce special effects and execute tricky passages. However, Pachelbel's collection was intended for amateur violinists, and scordatura tuning is used here as a basic introduction to the technique. Scordatura only involves the tonic, dominant and sometimes the subdominant notes.

Each suite of Musikalische Ergötzung begins with an introductory Sonata or Sonatina in one movement. In suites 1 and 3 these introductory movements are Allegro three-voice fughettas and stretti. The other four sonatas are reminiscent of French overtures. They have two Adagio sections which juxtapose slower and faster rhythms: the first section uses patterns of dotted quarter and eighth notes in a non-imitative manner. The second employs the violins in an imitative, sometimes homophonic structure, that uses shorter note values. The dance movements of the suites show traces of Italian (in the gigues of suites 2 and 6) and German (allemande appears in suites 1 and 2) influence, but the majority of the movements are clearly influenced by the French style. The suites do not adhere to a fixed structure: the allemande is only present in two suites, the gigues in four, two suites end with a chaconne, and the fourth suite contains two arias.

Pachelbel's other chamber music includes an aria and variations (Aria con variazioni in A major) and four standalone suites scored for a string quartet or a typical French five-part string ensemble with 2 violins, 2 violas and a violone (the latter reinforces the basso continuo). Of these, the five-part suite in G major (Partie a 5 in G major) is a variation suite, where each movement begins with a theme from the opening sonatina; like its four-part cousin (Partie a 4 in G major) and the third standalone suite (Partie a 4 in F♯ minor) it updates the German suite model by using the latest French dances such as the gavotte or the ballet. The three pieces mentioned all end with a Finale movement. Partie a 4 in G major features no figuration for the lower part, which means that it was not a basso continuo and that, as Jean M. Perreault writes, "this work may well count as the first true string quartet, at least within the Germanophone domain."

=== Vocal music ===
Johann Gottfried Walther famously described Pachelbel's vocal works as "more perfectly executed than anything before them". Already the earliest examples of Pachelbel's vocal writing, two arias "So ist denn dies der Tag" and "So ist denn nur die Treu" composed in Erfurt in 1679 (which are also Pachelbel's earliest datable pieces,) display impressive mastery of large-scale composition ("So ist denn dies der Tag" is scored for soprano, SATB choir, 2 violins, 3 violas, 4 trumpets, timpani and basso continuo) and exceptional knowledge of contemporary techniques.

These latter features are also found in Pachelbel's Vespers pieces and sacred concertos, large-scale compositions which are probably his most important vocal works. Almost all of them adopt the modern concertato idiom and many are scored for unusually large groups of instruments (Jauchzet dem Herrn, alle Welt (in C) uses four trumpets, timpani, 2 violins, 3 violas, violone and basso continuo; Lobet den Herrn in seinem Heiligtum is scored for a five-part chorus, two flutes, bassoon, five trumpets, trombone, drums, cymbals, harp, two violins, basso continuo and organ). Pachelbel explores a very wide range of styles: psalm settings (Gott ist unser Zuversicht), chorale concertos (Christ lag in Todesbanden), sets of chorale variations (Was Gott tut, das ist wohlgetan), concerted motets, etc. The ensembles for which these works are scored are equally diverse: from the famous D major Magnificat setting written for a 4-part choir, 4 violas and basso continuo, to the Magnificat in C major scored for a five-part chorus, 4 trumpets, timpani, 2 violins, a single viola and two violas da gamba, bassoon, basso continuo and organ.

Pachelbel's large-scale vocal works are mostly written in modern style influenced by Italian Catholic music, with only a few non-concerted pieces and old plainchant cantus firmus techniques employed very infrequently. The string ensemble is typical for the time, three viols and two violins. The former are either used to provide harmonic content in instrumental sections or to double the vocal lines in tutti sections; the violins either engage in contrapuntal textures of varying density or are employed for ornamentation. Distinct features of Pachelbel's vocal writing in these pieces, aside from the fact that it is almost always very strongly tonal, include frequent use of permutation fugues and writing for paired voices. The Magnificat settings, most composed during Pachelbel's late Nuremberg years, are influenced by the Italian-Viennese style and distinguish themselves from their antecedents by treating the canticle in a variety of ways and stepping away from text-dependent composition.

Other vocal music includes motets, arias and two masses. Of the eleven extant motets, ten are scored for two four-part choruses. Most of this music is harmonically simple and makes little use of complex polyphony (indeed, the polyphonic passages frequently feature reduction of parts). The texts are taken from the psalms, except in Nun danket alle Gott which uses a short passage from Ecclesiastes. The motets are structured according to the text they use. One important feature found in Gott ist unser Zuversicht and Nun danket alle Gott is that their endings are four-part chorale settings reminiscent of Pachelbel's organ chorale model: the chorale, presented in long note values, is sung by the sopranos, while the six lower parts accompany with passages in shorter note values:

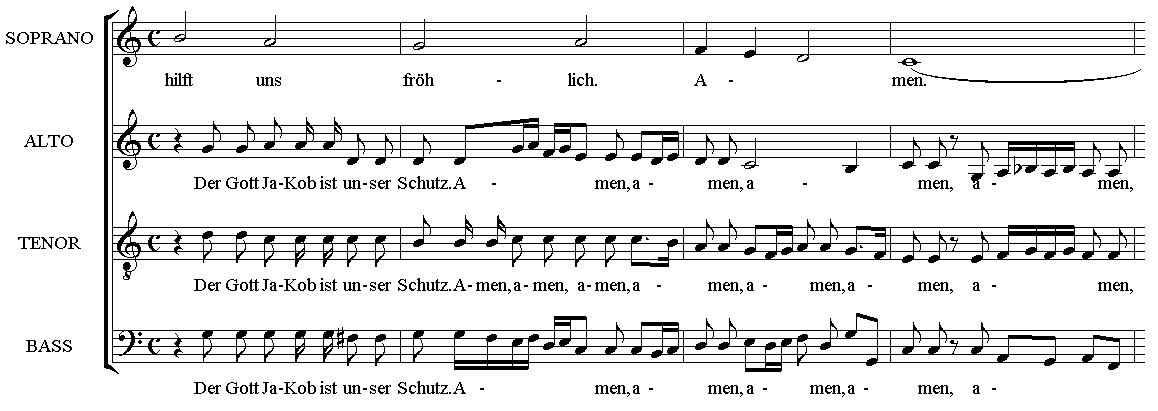
Excerpt from the ending of motet Gott ist unser Zuversicht (bars 92–95). These are the first choir's parts, the notes and lines for the second choir are the same.

The arias, aside from the two 1679 works discussed above, are usually scored for solo voice accompanied by several instruments; most were written for occasions such as weddings, birthdays, funerals and baptisms. They include both simple strophic and complex sectional pieces of varying degrees of complexity, some include sections for the chorus. The concerted Mass in C major is probably an early work; the D major Missa brevis is a small mass for an SATB choir in three movements (Kyrie, Gloria, Credo). It is simple, unadorned and reminiscent of his motets.

== Posthumous influence ==
One of the last middle Baroque composers, Pachelbel did not have any considerable influence on most of the famous late Baroque composers, such as George Frideric Handel, Domenico Scarlatti or Georg Philipp Telemann. However, he did influence Johann Sebastian Bach indirectly; the young Johann Sebastian was tutored by his older brother Johann Christoph Bach, who studied with Pachelbel, so J.S. Bach's early chorales and chorale variations borrow from Pachelbel's music, though the style of northern German composers, such as Georg Böhm, Dieterich Buxtehude, and Johann Adam Reincken, also played an important role in the development of Bach's talent.

Pachelbel was the last great composer of the Nuremberg tradition and the last important southern German composer. Pachelbel's influence was mostly limited to his pupils, most notably Johann Christoph Bach, Johann Heinrich Buttstett, Andreas Nicolaus Vetter, and two of Pachelbel's sons, Wilhelm Hieronymus and Charles Theodore. The latter became one of the first European composers to take up residence in the American colonies and so Pachelbel influenced, although indirectly and only to a certain degree, the American church music of the era. Composer, musicologist and writer Johann Gottfried Walther is probably the most famous of the composers influenced by Pachelbel – he is, in fact, referred to as the "second Pachelbel" in Mattheson's Grundlage einer Ehrenpforte.

As the Baroque style went out of fashion during the 18th century, the majority of Baroque and pre-Baroque composers were virtually forgotten. Local organists in Nuremberg and Erfurt knew Pachelbel's music and occasionally performed it, but the public and the majority of composers and performers did not pay much attention to Pachelbel and his contemporaries. In the first half of the 19th century, some organ works by Pachelbel were published and several musicologists started considering him an important composer, particularly Philipp Spitta, who was one of the first researchers to trace Pachelbel's role in the development of Baroque keyboard music. Much of Pachelbel's work was published in the early 20th century in the Denkmäler der Tonkunst in Österreich series, but it was not until the rise of interest in early Baroque music in the middle of the 20th century and the advent of historically informed performance practice and associated research that Pachelbel's works began to be studied extensively and again performed more frequently.

Canon in D major
Arrangement for violins, harps and bass by Kevin MacLeod

Pachelbel's Canon, a piece of chamber music scored for three violins and basso continuo and originally paired with a gigue in the same key, experienced a surge in popularity during the 1970s. This is due to a recording by Jean-François Paillard in 1968, which made it a universally recognized cultural item. Its visibility was increased by its choice as the theme music for the film Ordinary People in 1980. One of the most recognized and famous Baroque compositions, it became popular for use in weddings, rivaling Wagner's Bridal Chorus. Despite its centuries-old heritage, the Canon's chord progression has been used widely in pop music in the 20th and 21st centuries. It has been called "almost the godfather of pop music" by Pete Waterman.

== Sources ==
- Apel, Willi (1972). The History of Keyboard Music to 1700. Translated by Hans Tischler. Indiana University Press. ISBN 0-253-21141-7.. Originally published as Geschichte der Orgel- und Klaviermusik bis 1700 by Bärenreiter-Verlag, Kassel.
- Buszin, Walter E. (1959). "Johann Pachelbel's Contribution to Pre-Bach Organ Literature". The Musical Heritage of the Church. Vol. 5. St. Louis: Concordia Publishing House. Archived from the original on 3 March 2006.
- Nolte, Ewald Valentin (2001). "Pachelbel [Bachelbel], Johann". In Butt, John (ed.). Grove Music Online. Revised by John Butt. Oxford: Oxford University Press. doi:10.1093/gmo/9781561592630.article.6002278237. ISBN 9781561592630. (subscription, Wikilibrary access, or UK public library membership required)
- Nolte, Ewald Valentin (1957). "Classic Contract between Pachelbel and Erfurt Church". The Diapason (32): xlviii.
- Perreault, Jean M. (2004). The Thematic Catalogue of the Musical Works of Johann Pachelbel. Lanham: Scarecrow Press. ISBN 0-8108-4970-4.
- Welter, Kathryn Jane (1998). Johann Pachelbel: Organist, Teacher, Composer, A Critical Reexamination of His Life, Works, and Historical Significance (PHD). Cambridge: Harvard University. OCLC 42665284.
