= St. Rochus Cemetery, Nuremberg =

Cemetery in Nuremberg, Germany

Coordinates: 49°26′51″N 11°03′37″E

Rochusfriedhof
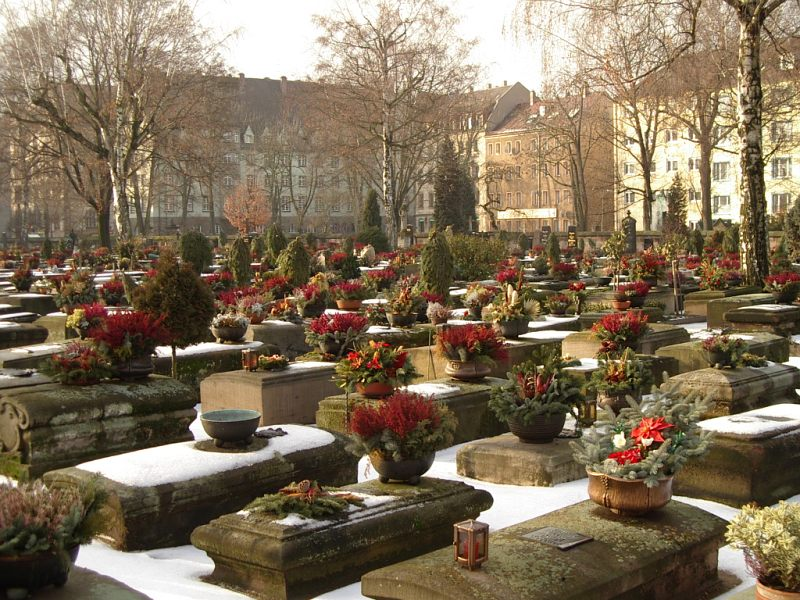
- St. Rochus Cemetery viewed from northwest.
- Interactive map of Rochusfriedhof

Details
- Established: c. 1517
- Location: Nuremberg
- Country: Germany
- Type: Protestant Cemetery
- Size: ?
- No. of graves: ?
- Website: https://st-johannisfriedhof-nuernberg.de/infos-rochusfriedhof/
- Find a Grave: Rochusfriedhof

St. Rochus Cemetery (Rochusfriedhof) is a cemetery in Nuremberg, Germany. It is located in the Gostenhof quarter.

== History ==
The cemetery was created in late 1510s to bury the victims of the plague epidemic of 1517–18. To avoid spreading the disease, city authorities decided to build the cemetery at some distance from the city, so St. Rochus is located outside the old city wall. The cemetery was finally consecrated on 21 March 1519. St. Rochus Chapel (Rochuskapelle), a small chapel, was built in 1520–21. The architect was Hans Beheim the Elder, who also built a chapel for Johannisfriedhof, another old Nuremberg cemetery.

St. Rochus Cemetery – Rochusfriedhof

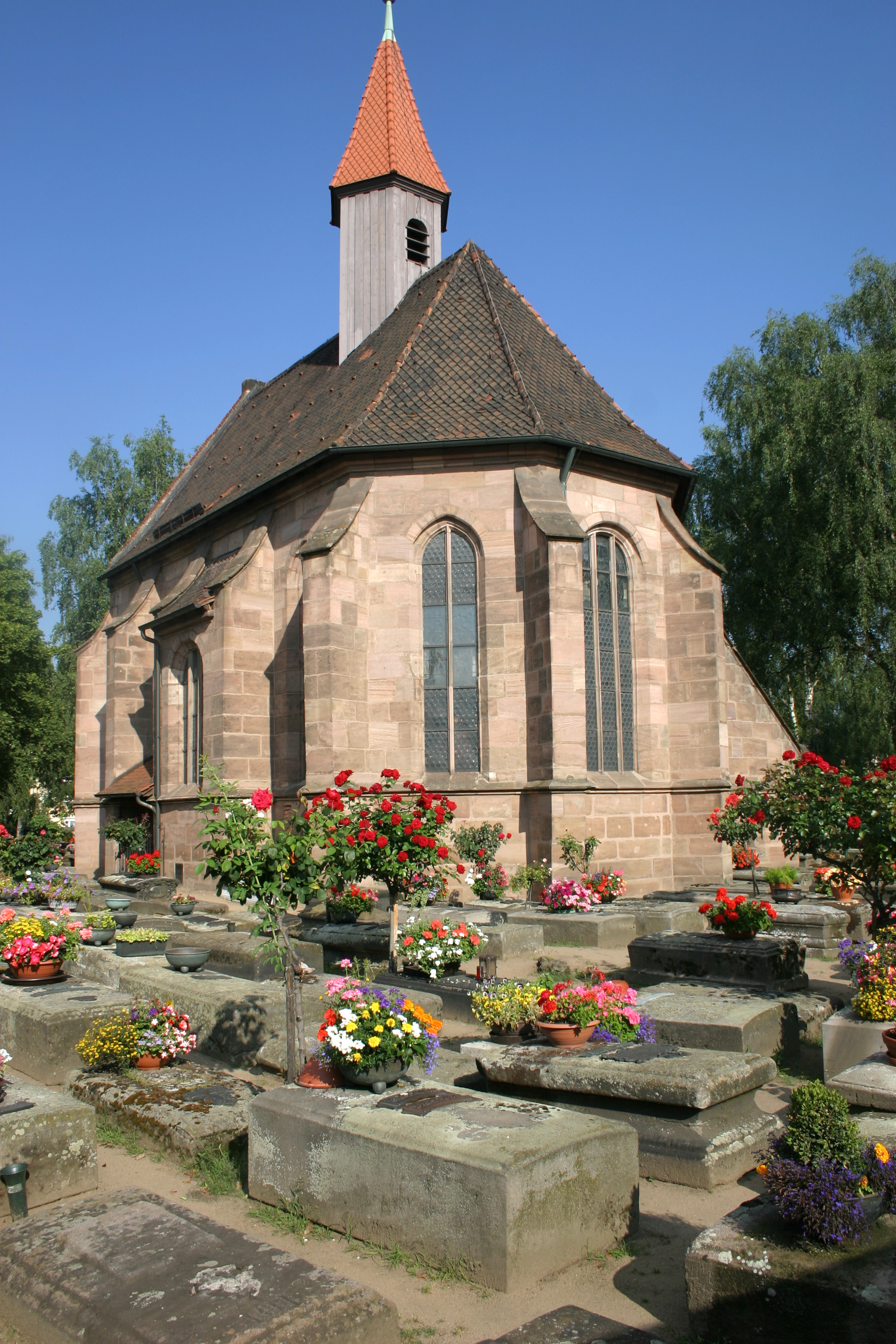

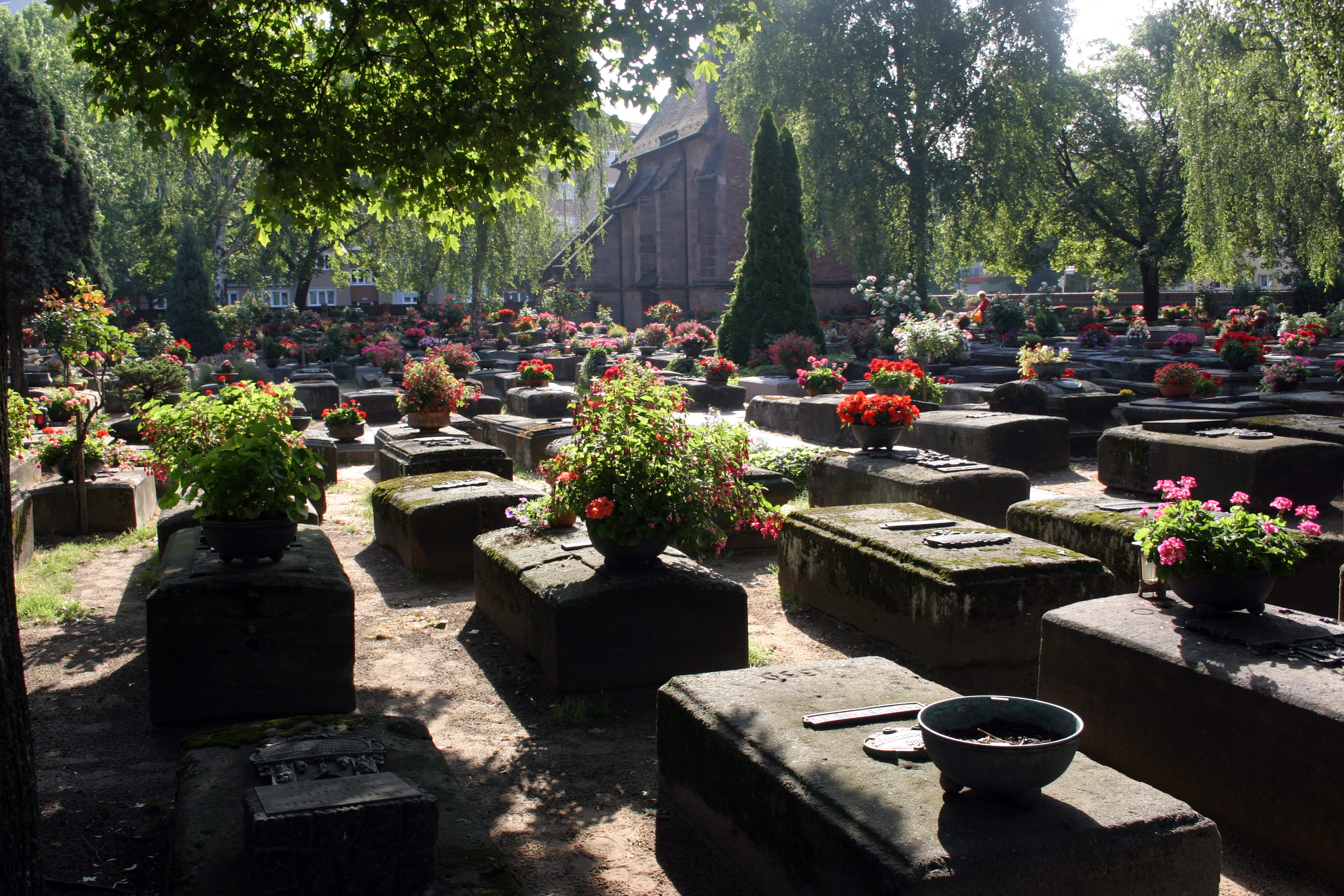

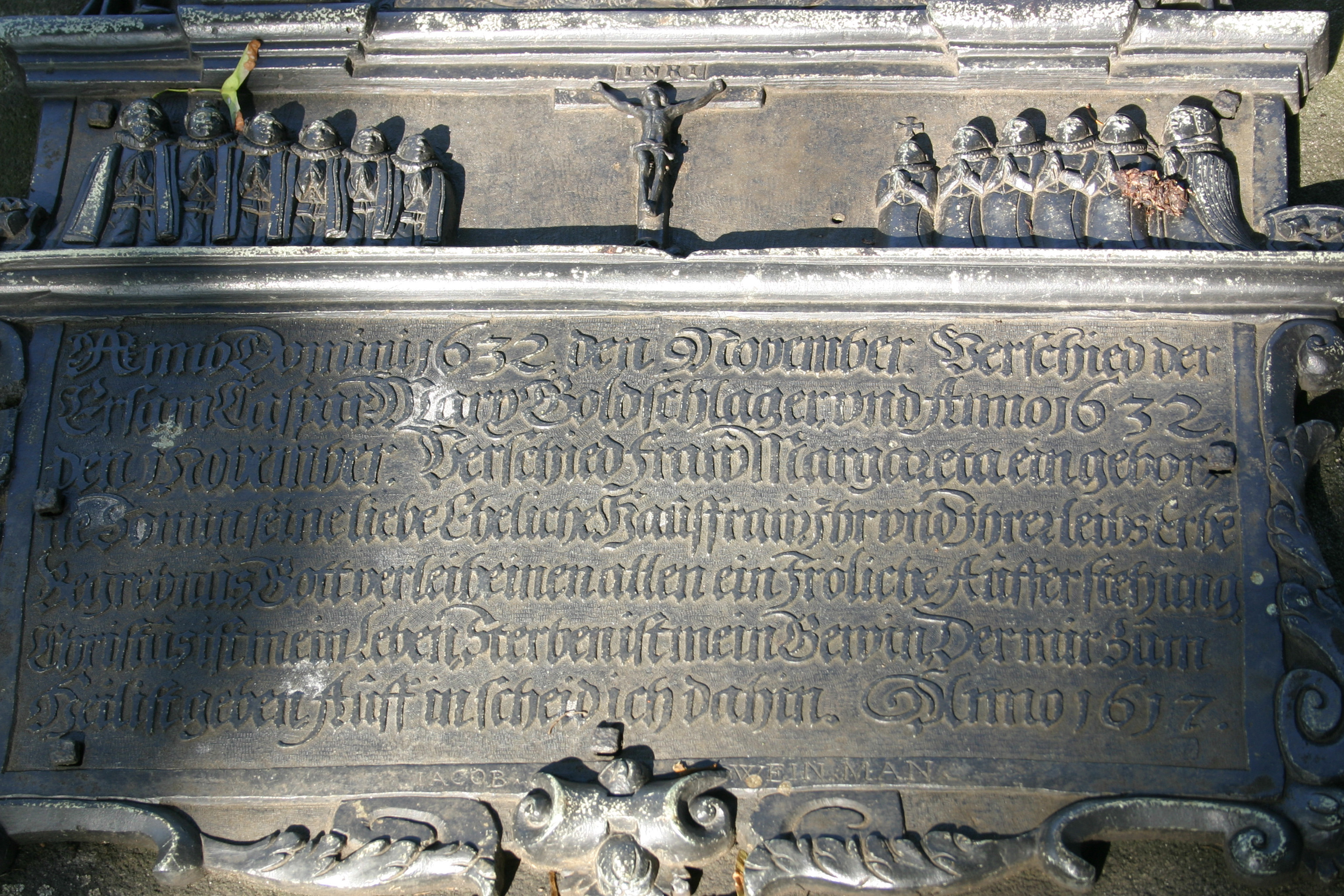

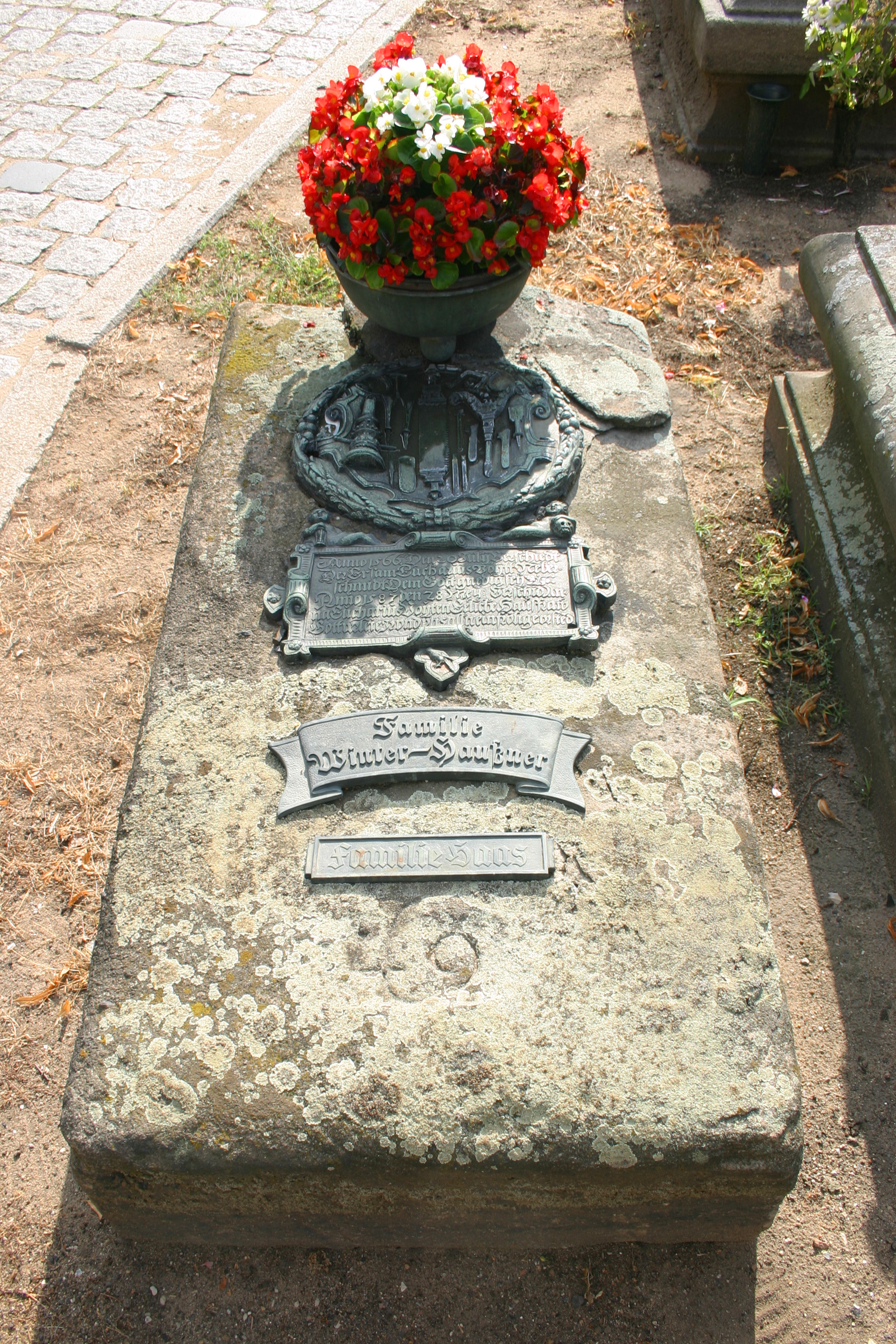

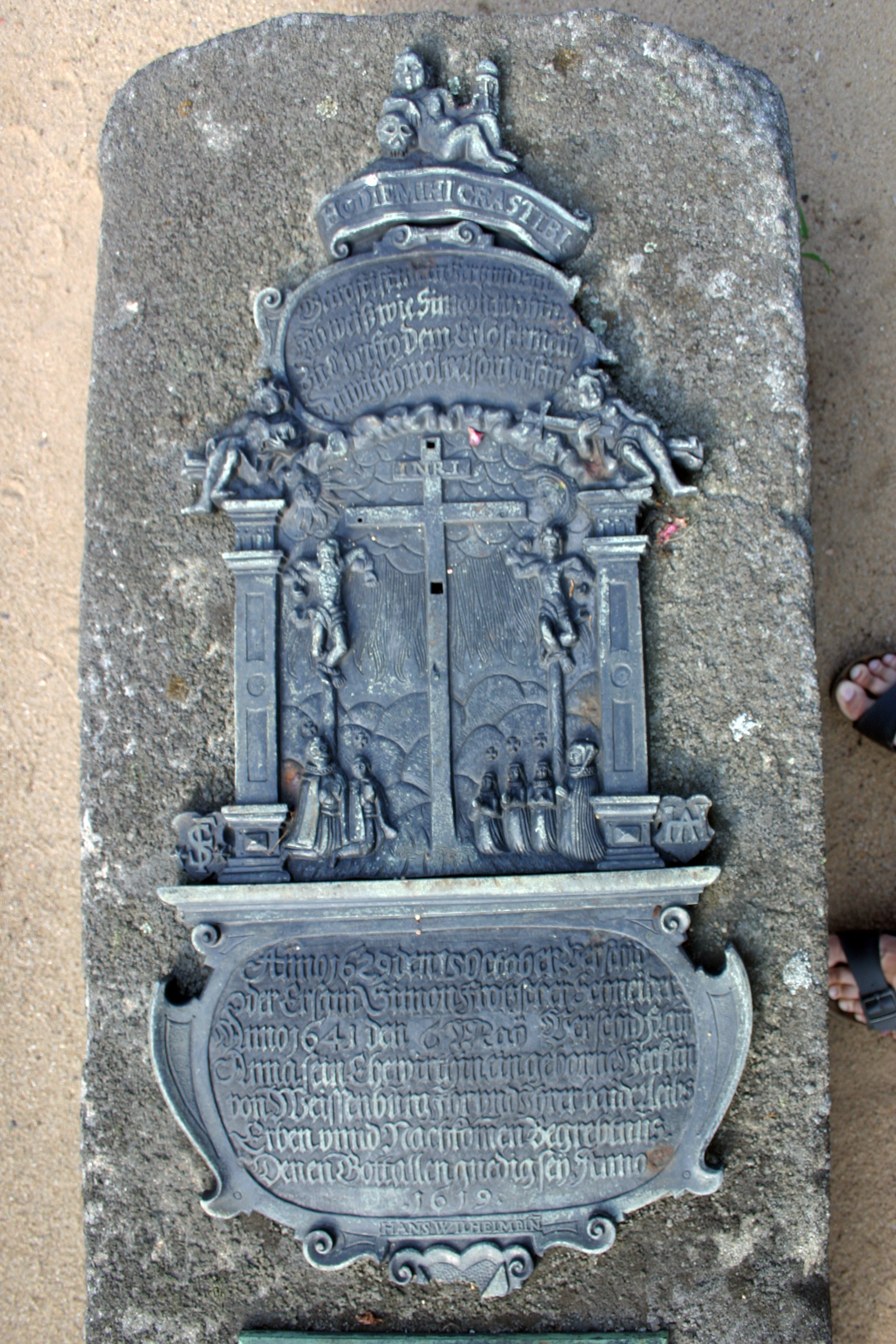

== Notable interments ==
- Johann Pachelbel (1653–1706), composer.
- Peter Vischer the Elder (c. 1455–1529), sculptor.
