= Bicinium =

Type of Renaissance and early Baroque composition

Bicinium super Omnis arbor

In music of the Renaissance and early Baroque eras, a bicinium (pl. bicinia) was a composition for only two parts, especially one for the purpose of teaching counterpoint or singing.

The term has had two usages in music history:

1. Recently, the term has come to mean any composition at all from the Renaissance or early Baroque period for two vocal or instrumental parts.
2. Historically, a bicinium referred specifically to a two-part composition used as a teaching tool, most often in Protestant, German-speaking areas.

The term was first used in Poland, by Jan z Lublina in a treatise of 1540. Volumes of bicinia were published in the next several decades in Germany, the Low Countries, and even in Italy, as the usefulness of bicinia as teaching aids became apparent. In addition, Martin Luther had strongly expressed that children should learn both music and the psalms: bicinia with German texts from the Psalms fulfilled his purpose.

Students could be expected to master singing a single part in a duet more easily than a part in a larger ensemble. Usually a bicinium was designed to be sung or played by students of the same age and ability, rather than for a single student and a teacher.

This model of moving from two-part study, writing, and singing to three parts and then more was adopted by Heinrich Glarean in his Dodecachordon (1547), one of the most influential music theory and pedagogy treatises of the Renaissance.

In a similar manner, present-day music students typically learn counterpoint first by writing in two parts, and then later in three, only moving to four or more parts after mastering the earlier stages.

A similar pedagogical composition for three voices is known as a tricinium (pl. tricinia).

== See also ==
- Étude
