= Charles Theodore Pachelbel =

American classical composer

Charles Theodore Pachelbel (baptized Carl Theodorus, also spelled Karl Theodor, on 24 November [O.S. 14 November] 1690; buried 15 September 1750) was a German composer, organist and harpsichordist of the late Baroque era. He was the son of the more famous Johann Pachelbel, composer of the popular Canon in D. He was one of the first European composers to take up residence in the American colonies, and was the most famous musical figure in early Charleston, South Carolina.

== Life ==
=== Early years (1690–1732) ===
He was born in Stuttgart and baptized in the Evangelische Kirchengemeinde (Protestant parish) there on 24 November 1690, son of Johann Pachelbel and his second wife Judith Drommer. The family moved to Gotha in 1692, then to Nuremberg in 1695. Nothing is known about Charles Theodore's life for 25 years after 1706, when his father died, except the fact that he probably lived in England for some time (his name appears in a 1732 list of subscribers to a volume of harpsichord music published in London).

=== The colonies (1733–50) ===
The circumstances of his emigration to the colonies are unknown. Pachelbel was living in Boston, Massachusetts, by spring 1733, when he was asked to assist in the installation of the new organ of Trinity Church in Newport, Rhode Island. The instrument was donated to Trinity by George Berkeley, the famous philosopher. Pachelbel was subsequently hired as organist of the church and held the post until approximately mid-1735. In 1736 Pachelbel gave two public concerts in New York: on 21 January and on 9 March. Both took place in Robert Todd's house, an important tavern. Pachelbel played the harpsichord, accompanied by local musicians and singers.

Pachelbel soon left for Charleston, South Carolina, where he spent the rest of his life. On 16 February 1737 he married Hanna Poitevin in St. Philip's Church in Charleston. The couple had at least one child, Charles, born on 10 September 1739. This could have been Pachelbel's second marriage, because traces of an older daughter have been found. He actively participated in the musical life of the city: on 22 November 1737 he organized a concert of vocal and instrumental music, apparently the first public concert in the Charleston area; in February 1740 he succeeded John Salter as organist of St. Philip's Church; and in 1749, one year before he died, he opened a singing school. Pachelbel's death in 1750 was apparently caused by some sort of illness, referred to as a "lameness in the hands" in the documents. His wife outlived him by 19 years and died on 6 September 1769. There is no further record of Pachelbel's children.

== Works ==
Only a handful of works by Charles Pachelbel survive; the most famous is an aria God of sleep, for whom I languish. His Magnificat for double choir is performed with some frequency. The young Peter Pelham studied with him since Newport and followed him to Charleston; some of Pachelbel's compositions survive in Pelham's partbooks. Included in the list of Pachelbel's possessions compiled after his death are a harpsichord, a clavichord and collections of sheet music, but none of these seem to have survived.

== References and further reading ==
- Butler, H. Joseph: "Charles Theodore Pachelbel", Grove Music Online ed. L. Macy (Accessed March 2, 2005), (subscription access)
- Cienniwa, Paul: "Music at Trinity" (Accessed July 25, 2011)
- Redway, Virginia Larkin: "Charles Theodore Pachelbell, Musical Emigrant", Journal of the American Musicological Society, Vol. 5, No. 1. 1952. pp. 32–36
- Redway, Virginia Larkin: "A New York Concert in 1736", The Musical Quarterly, Vol. 22, No. 2. 1936. pp. 170–177
- Welter, Kathryn Jane: Johann Pachelbel: Organist, Teacher, Composer. A Critical Reexamination of His Life, Works, and Historical Significance. Harvard University, Cambridge, Massachusetts, 1998, dissertation. Available through UMI Dissertation Services, 2001. 384p
- Williams, G.W.: "Early Organists at St Philip's, Charleston", South Carolina Historical Magazine, liv (1953), 83–87
