= Amalia Pachelbel =

German painter and engraver (1688–1723)

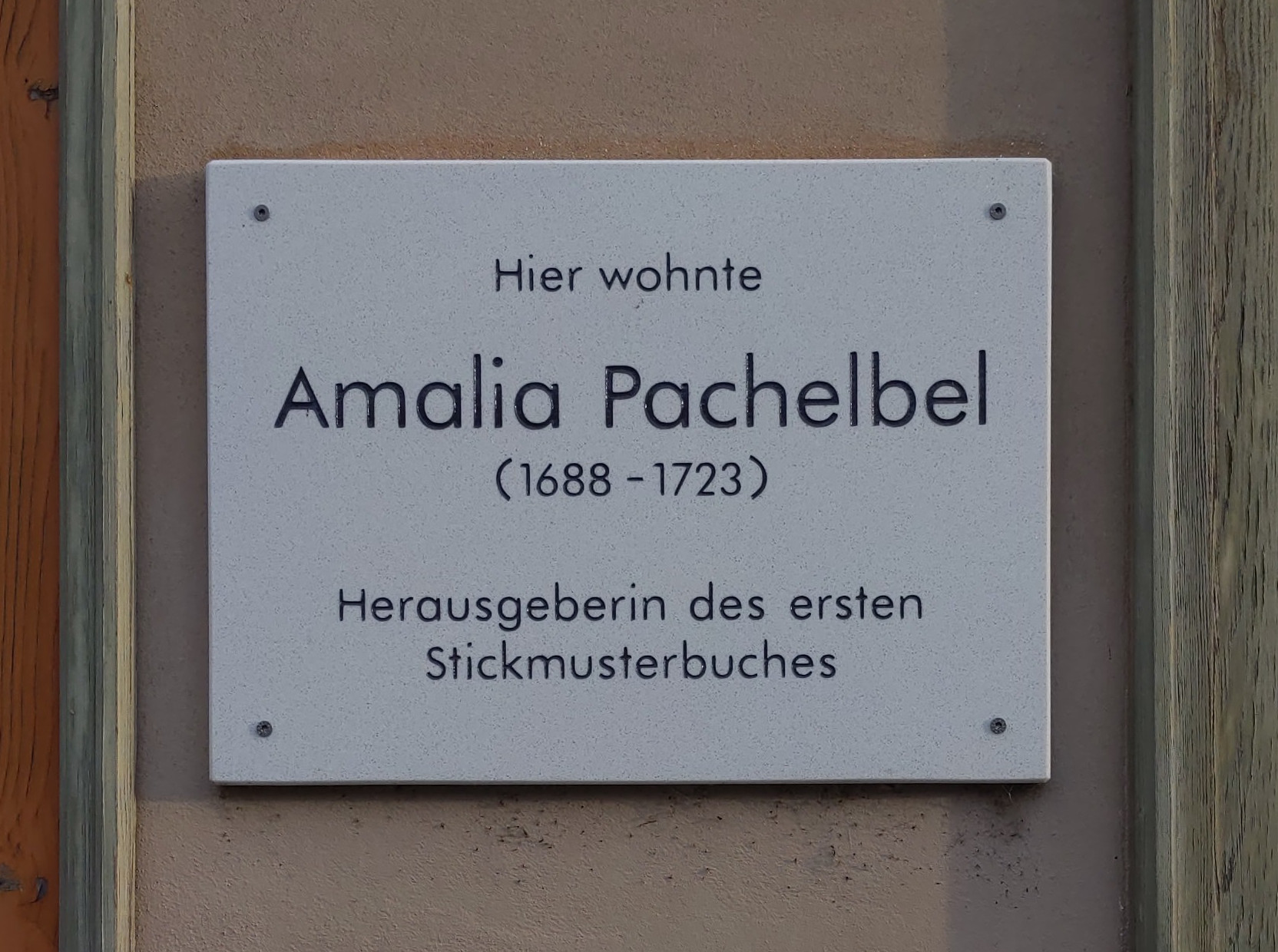
Commemorative plaque in Erfurt. The German text reads: "Here lived Amalia Pachelbel (1688–1723). Author of the first embroidery pattern textbook."

Amalia Pachelbel (29 October [O.S. 19 October] 1688 – 6 December 1723) was a German painter and engraver. She was born in Erfurt and was the oldest daughter of composer Johann Pachelbel. She was named after Amalia Oeheim, who was Johann's sister-in-law. According to Pachelbel's obituary retold in Mattheson's Grundlage einer Ehrenpforte of 1740, Amalia's interest in art pleased her father, and he was always supportive of her. Amalia became known for her floral watercolors, copper engravings and porcelain pieces. In 1715 she married notary J. G. Beer. She died in Nuremberg in 1723. In 1730, seven years after her death, she was included in Doppelmayr's encyclopedia of important mathematicians and artists of Nuremberg (Historische Nachricht von den Nürnbergischen Mathematicis und Künstlern), as was her father.

A commemorative plaque installed on a house in Erfurt where the Pachelbel family lived mentions her as the "author of the first embroidery pattern (formula) textbook". A previous version of the plaque had two mistakes.
