= Christoph Weigel the Elder =

German engraver, art dealer and publisher (1654–1725)

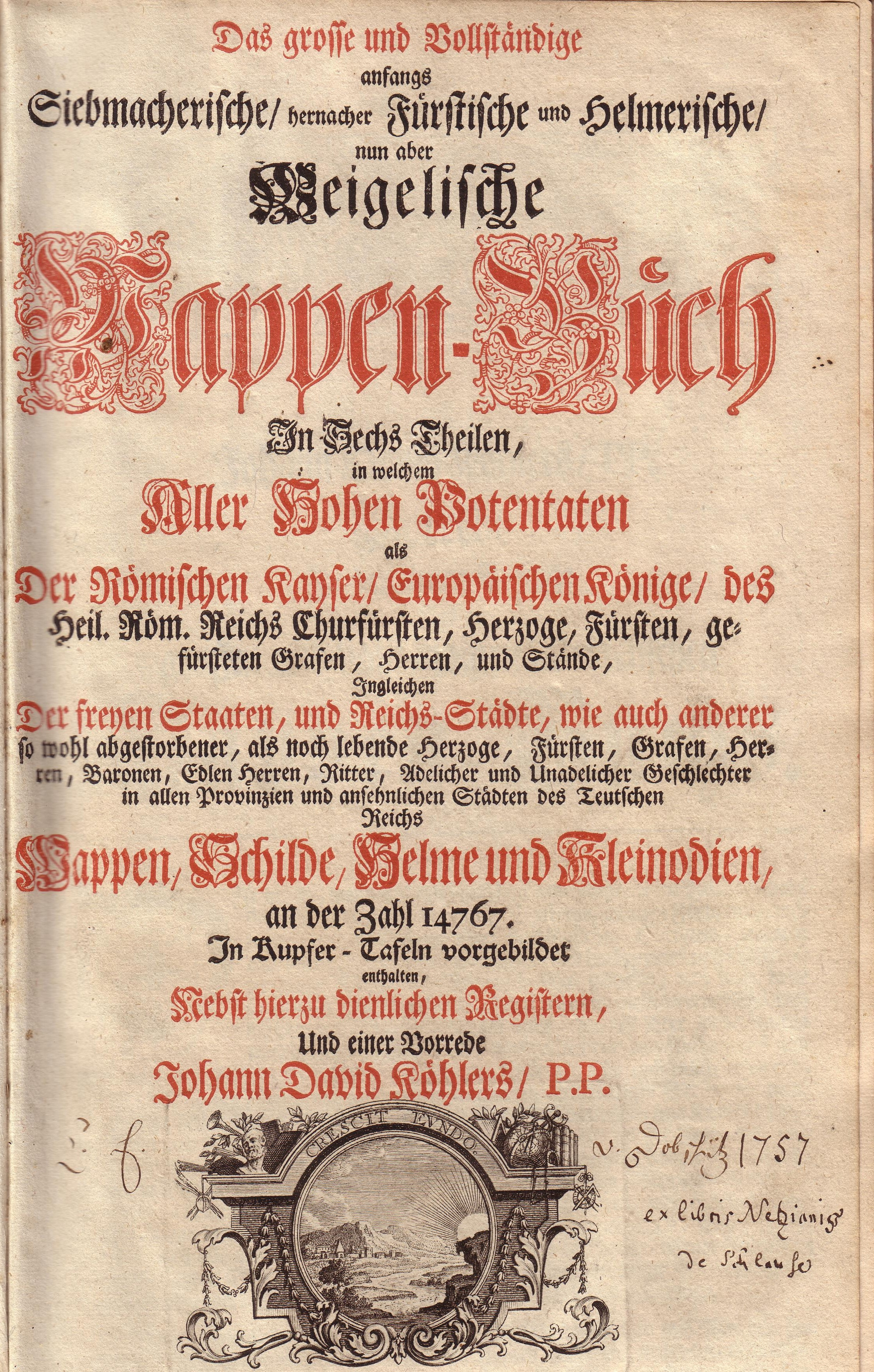
Christoph Weigel's book of heraldry, published posthumously by his widow in 1734

Johann Christoph Weigel, known as Christoph Weigel the Elder (9 November 1654 – 5 February 1725), was a German engraver, art dealer and publisher. He was born at Redwitz, Free imperial city of Eger in Egerland, and died in Nuremberg, aged 70.

Christoph Weigel the Elder learned the art of engraving in Augsburg. After various positions, including in Vienna and Frankfurt am Main, he acquired citizenship in Nuremberg in 1698. Weigel's first work from his own, successfully run publishing house in Nuremberg was Bilderlust from 1698. Around 70 books and a series of engravings were published by this publishing house during his lifetime.

One of his most important works is the Register of Estates from 1698. In it, Weigel described and described more than two hundred types of crafts and services, each illustrated by a copper engraving, based on life. Weigel visited almost all of the workshops himself, drew and observed on-site, coordinated the content of his articles with the master craftsmen, and copied important equipment from the original.

Another important work by Weigel is the new edition of the Coat of Arms book by Johann Siebmacher. The work was published under the title The Great and Complete, initially Siebmachers Wappenbuch, then Fürstischen and Helmerische / and now Weigelian Coat of Arms Book. In six parts with coats of arms, shields, helmets and jewels, numbering 14,767, prefigured in copper plates. It was first published by his widow with Lorenz Bieling in Nuremberg; In 1734, it was published in two volumes by the company's publisher.

Weigel worked particularly brilliantly in the scraping and line manner. He was the first engraver to use a type of machine for the underground. In Nuremberg, he worked very closely with the imperial geographer and cartographer Johann Baptist Homann (1664–1724), when producing his maps. His younger brother Johann Christoph Weigel ran an art shop in Nuremberg around the same time and was also very successful.

Weigel's publishing house was continued after 1725 by his widow, who published a number of her late husband's works, for example, his coat of arms book.
