= Chronological list of German classical composers =

The following is a chronological list of classical music composers who lived in, worked in, were German citizens, or who grew up and made their careers in Germany.

== Medieval ==
- Hildegard von Bingen (1098–1179)

== Renaissance ==
- Caspar Othmayr (1515–1553)
- Valentin Haussmann (c. 1560 – c. 1613–14)
- Hans Leo Hassler (1564–1612)

== Baroque ==
- Michael Praetorius (1571–1621)
- Andreas Hakenberger (1574–1627)
- Heinrich Schütz (1585–1672)
- Samuel Scheidt (1587–1653)
- Johann Schop (1590–1667)
- Johann Jakob Froberger (1616–1667)
- Kaspar Förster (1616–1673)
- Heinrich Schwemmer (1621–1696)
- Johann Caspar Kerll (1627–1693)
- Georg Caspar Wecker (1632–1695)
- Adam Krieger (1634–1666)
- Dieterich Buxtehude (1637-1707)
- Johann Philipp Krieger (1649–1725)
- Johann Krieger (1651–1735)
- Georg Muffat (1653–1704)
- Johann Pachelbel (1653–1706)
- Johann Kuhnau (1660–1722)
- Christian Friedrich Witt (1660–1717)
- Giovanni Henrico Albicastro (1660–1730)
- Franz Xaver Murschhauser (1663–1738)
- Georg Caspar Schürmann (1672/1673–1751)
- Georg Friedrich Kauffmann (1679–1735)
- Georg Philipp Telemann (1681–1767)
- Johann David Heinichen (1683–1729)
- Johann Sebastian Bach (1685–1750)
- George Frideric Handel (1685–1759)
- Sylvius Leopold Weiss (1687–1750)
- Johann Friedrich Fasch (1688–1758)
- Gottfried Heinrich Stölzel (1690–1749)
- Johann Christian Hertel (1697–1754)
- Johann Joachim Quantz (1697–1773)
- Johann Gottlieb Graun (1703–1771)
- Carl Heinrich Graun (1704–1759)

== Classical era ==
- Johan Agrell (1701–1765)
- Johann Ernst Eberlin (1702–1762)
- Johann Gottlieb Janitsch (1708–c. 1763)
- Christoph Schaffrath (1709–1763)
- Wilhelm Friedmann Bach (1710–1784)
- Frederick II of Prussia (1712–1786)
- Johann Ludwig Krebs (1713–1780)
- Carl Philipp Emanuel Bach (1714–1788)
- Christoph Willibald Gluck (1714–1787)
- Gottfried August Homilius (1714–1785)
- Johann Schobert (1720?–1767)
- Bernhard Joachim Hagen (1720–1787)
- Jakob Friedrich Kleinknecht (1722–1794)
- Carl Friedrich Abel (1723–1787)
- Johann Wilhelm Hertel (1727–1789)
- Hermann Friedrich Raupach (1728–1778)
- Florian Leopold Gassmann (1729–1774)
- Joseph Haydn (1732–1809)
- Johann Christoph Friedrich Bach (1732–1795)
- Johann Christian Fischer (1733–1800)
- Johann Christian Bach (1735–1782)
- Anton Schweitzer (1735–1787)
- Johann Gottfried Eckhardt (1735–1809)
- Johann Michael Haydn (1737–1806)
- Johann Christoph Oley (1738–1789)
- Friedrich Wilhelm Herschel (1738–1822)
- Ernst Eichner (1740–1777)
- Anton Zimmermann (1741–1781)
- Roman Hoffstetter (1742–1815)
- Johann Peter Salomon (1745–1815)
- Johann Wilhelm Hässler (1747–1822)
- Joseph Schuster (1748–1812)
- Emanuel Aloys Förster (1748–1823)
- Theodor von Schacht (1748–1823)
- Johann Friedrich Edelmann (1749–1794)
- Peter Winter (1754–1825)
- Joseph Martin Kraus (1756–1792)
- Franz Johannes Gleißner (1759–1818)
- Franz Danzi (1763–1826)
- Simon Mayr (1763–1845)

== Romantic/Post-romantic ==
- Peter Anton Kreusser (1765–1831)
- Franz Xaver Kleinheinz (1765–1832)
- Ludwig van Beethoven (1770–1827)
- Peter Hänsel (1770–1831)
- Friedrich Jeremias Witt (1770–1836)
- Ferdinand Ries (1784–1838)
- Louis Spohr (1784–1859)
- Friedrich Wilhelm Michael Kalkbrenner (1785–1849)
- Carl Maria von Weber (1786–1826)
- Johann Peter Pixis (1788–1874)
- Giacomo Meyerbeer (1791–1864)
- Heinrich Marschner (1795–1861)
- Johann Carl Gottfried Löwe (1796–1869)
- Franz Schubert (1797-1828)
- Fanny Mendelssohn (1805–1847)
- Felix Mendelssohn (1809–1847)
- Carl Baermann (1810–1885)
- Otto Nicolai (1810–1849)
- Robert Schumann (1810–1856)
- Ferdinand Hiller (1811–1885)
- Emilie Mayer (1812–1883)
- Julius Rietz (1812–1877)
- Richard Wagner (1813–1883)
- Adolf von Henselt (1814–1889)
- Friedrich Robert Volkmann (1815–1883)
- Jacques Offenbach (1819–1880)
- Clara Schumann (1819–1896)
- Peter Cornelius (1824–1874)
- Carl Reinecke (1824–1910)
- Albert Dietrich (1829–1908)
- Karl Klindworth (1830–1916)
- Hans Bronsart von Schellendorff (1830–1913)
- Hans von Bülow (1830–1894)
- Johannes Brahms (1833–1897)
- Franz Wohlfahrt (1833–1884)
- Julius Reubke (1834–1858)
- Max Bruch (1838–1920)
- Carl Baermann (pianist) (1839–1913)
- Josef Gabriel Rheinberger (1839–1901)
- Max Liebling (1845–1927)
- August Friedrich Martin Klughardt (1847–1902)
- Philipp Scharwenka (1847–1917)
- Fritz Seitz (1848–1918)
- Emil Liebling (1851–1914)
- Engelbert Humperdinck (1854–1921)
- Paul Klengel (1854–1935)
- Max Wagenknecht (1857–1922)
- Sally Liebling (1859–1909)
- Julius Klengel (1859–1933)
- Richard Strauss (1864–1949)
- Georg Liebling (1865–1946)
- Paul Lincke (1866–1946)
- Ferdinand Küchler (1867–1937)
- Hans Pfitzner (1869–1949)
- Max Reger (1873–1916)

== Modern/Post-modern/Contemporary ==
- Richard Wetz (1875–1935)
- Sigfrid Karg-Elert (1877–1933)
- Eduard Künneke (1885–1953)
- Wilhelm Furtwängler (1886–1954)
- Rudi Stephan (1887–1915)
- Carl Orff (1895–1982)
- Paul Hindemith (1895–1963)
- Herbert Eimert (1897–1972)
- Kurt Weill (1900–1950)
- Werner Egk (1901–1983)
- Stefan Wolpe (1902–1972)
- Boris Blacher (1903–1975)
- Karl Amadeus Hartmann (1905–1963)
- Martin Scherber (1907–1974)
- Berthold Goldschmidt (1903–1996)
- Bernd Alois Zimmermann (1918–1970)
- Fritz Geißler (1921–1984)
- Bertold Hummel (1925–2002)
- Hans Werner Henze (1926–2012)
- Karlheinz Stockhausen (1928–2007)
- Roland Kayn (1933–2011)
- Helmut Lachenmann (born 1935)
- Aribert Reimann (1936–2024)
- Michael von Biel (born 1937)
- Hans-Joachim Hespos (1938–2022)
- Nicolaus A. Huber (born 1938)
- Johannes Fritsch (1941–2010)
- Asmus Tietchens (born 1947)
- Wolfgang Rihm (1952–2024)
- Hans-Jürgen von Bose (born 1953)
- Alexander Schubert (born 1979)
