= German organ schools =

The 17th century organ composers of Germany can be divided into two primary schools: the north German school and the south German school (sometimes a third school, central German, is added). The stylistic differences were dictated not only by teacher-pupil traditions and international influences, but also by separate organ building traditions: northern organs tend to have a tower layout with emphasis on the pedal division, while southern and Austrian instruments are typically divided around a window and emphasize manual divisions.

== North German organ school ==
=== Overview ===
The composer who is now considered the founder of this school is Jan Pieterszoon Sweelinck, a Dutch composer (a student of his father Pieter Swybbertszoon and of Gioseffo Zarlino in Venice). Sweelinck's fame as a teacher was very widespread (in Germany he was known as the "maker of organists"), as was his influence. However, the English keyboard school withered during the first half of the 17th century, and the Dutch composers after Sweelinck were either not on his level (Anthoni van Noordt) or left too few compositions to make any significant mark on the history of European music (Pieter Cornet). Sweelinck's influence therefore was primarily important in Germany, Heinrich Scheidemann and Gottfried Scheidt being the first major composers to study under him.

Later northerners like Franz Tunder, Georg Böhm and Johann Adam Reincken all cultivated a harmonically and rhythmically complex improvisatory style rooted in the chorale improvisation tradition. Forms such as the organ prelude (a multi-sectional composition with numerous flourishes and embellishments such as scale runs, arpeggios and complex counterpoint) and the chorale fantasia (a musical setting of a whole verse of the chorale text, resulting in a multi-sectional composition with contrasting sections for different lines) were developed almost exclusively by north German composers. Dieterich Buxtehude's work represents the pinnacle of this tradition; the praeludia form the core of his work. Nikolaus Bruhns was the most important of Buxtehude's pupils, but he died early and only a few works by him survive.

The quality of north German organs improved vastly during the 17th and early 18th century. The instruments would typically have two or more manuals, a pedalboard and a wide range of stops; this contributed to the style cultivated across the region as the majority of large-scale works require considerable pedal skills and benefit from larger, more versatile organs.

=== List of composers ===
- Johann Friedrich Alberti (studied under Werner Fabricius and Vincenzo Albrici)
- Vincenzo Albrici
- Bach Family
- Christoph Bernhard (studied under Paul Siefert and Agostino Fontana; worked with Heinrich Schütz and Matthias Weckmann)
- Georg Böhm (studied under Reincken)
- Jakob Bölsche (studied under Georg Dietrich Leyding)
- Nikolaus Bruhns (studied under Buxtehude; nephew of Friedrich Nicolaus Bruhns)
- Arnold Matthias Brunckhorst
- Johann Heinrich Buttstett (studied under Johann Pachelbel)
- Dieterich Buxtehude (Associate of Reincken and Pachelbel (one of the two dedicatees of Pachelbel's Hexachordum Apollinis; son-in-law and successor to Tunder)
- Andreas Düben I
- Andreas Düben (studied under Sweelinck; son of Andreas Düben I, brother of Martin Düben, father of Gustaf Düben)
- Gustaf Düben (studied under his father Andreas Düben)
- Martin Düben (son of Andreas Düben I, brother of Andreas Düben; like his brother, studied under Sweelinck)
- David Ebel I (father of David Ebel II; successor to Barthold Hering as Organist at St. Mary's Church, Lübeck
- David Ebel II
- Hermann Ebel (successor of Heinrich Marcus as Organist at St. Mary's Church, Lübeck; succeeded to post by Peter Hasse)
- Daniel Erich (studied under Buxtehude)
- Werner Fabricius (studied under Thomas Selle and Scheidemann)
- Christian Flor (predecessor as Organist at St. John's Church, Lüneburg to Böhm)
- Johann Philipp Förtsch (studied under Johann Philipp Krieger; a principal composer for the Hamburg Opera)
- Christian Geist
- Johann Nikolaus Hanff (teacher to Johann Mattheson)
- Nikolaus Hasse (son of Peter Hasse)
- Peter Hasse (studied under Sweelinck; Succeeded to post of Organist at St. Mary's Church, Lübeck by Franz Tunder)
- Peter Hasse II (studied under Sweelinck)
- Petrus Heydorn
- Ewaldt Hintz (studied under Johann Jakob Froberger)
- Wilhelm Karges
- Andreas Kneller (studied either under Tunder or his uncle Matthias Weckmann; brother to Sir Godfrey Kneller)
- Johann Ludwig Krebs (studied under J. S. Bach, son of Johann Tobias Krebs)
- Johann Tobias Krebs (studied under J. S. Bach, father of Johann Ludwig Krebs)
- Adam Krieger (studied under Samuel Scheidt)
- Jakob Kortkamp (studied under Jacob Praetorius)
- Georg Dietrich Leyding (studied under Reincken, Buxtehude, and Johann Theile)
- Johann Lorentz
- Vincent Lübeck (possibly studied under Kneller and Buxtehude)
- Heinrich Marcus
- Johann Valentin Meder
- Peter Mohrhardt
- Andreas Neunhaber (studied under Paul Siefert)
- Bartholomaeus Praetorius
- Hieronymus Praetorius (son of Jacob Praetorius I)
- Hieronymus (II) Praetorius
- Hieronymus (III) Praetorius (son of Jacob Praetorius; studied under Sweelinck)
- Jacob Praetorius I (father of Hieronymus Praetorius)
- Jacob Praetorius (son of Hieronymus Praetorius, brother of Michael (II) Praetorius and Johann Praetorius; studied under Sweelinck)
- Johann Praetorius (son of Hieronymus Praetorius, brother of Michael (II) Praetorius and Jacob Praetorius; studied under Sweelinck)
- Michael Praetorius (born Schultze)
- Michael (II) Praetorius (son of Hieronymus Praetorius, brother of Jacob Praetorius and Johann Praetorius)
- Johann Martin Radeck
- Johann Adam Reinken (studied under Scheidemann)
- Christian Ritter (studied under Christoph Bernhard)
- Georg Wilhelm Saxer
- Heinrich Scheidemann (studied under Sweelinck)
- Gottfried Scheidt (studied under Sweelinck; brother to Samuel Scheidt)
- Samuel Scheidt (studied under Sweelinck)
- Johann Christian Schieferdecker (friend to Reinhard Keiser (for whom he often composed operas for the Hamburg Opera); student, assistant, and successor to Buxtehude)
- Melchior Schildt (studied under Sweelinck)
- Paul Siefert (studied under Sweelinck; teacher to Andreas Neunhaber and possibly Christoph Bernhard)
- Johann Steffens
- Delphin Strungk (studied under Sweelinck; father of Nicolaus Adam Strungk)
- Nicolaus Adam Strungk (son of Delphin Strungk)
- Franz Tunder (possibly studied under Frescobaldi; father-in-law and predecessor as Organist of St. Mary's Church, Lübeck to Buxtehude)
- Andreas Nicolaus Vetter (studied under Pachelbel and Georg Caspar Wecker)
- Matthias Weckmann (studied under Schütz, Jacob Praetorius and Scheidemann)
- Andreas Werckmeister (possible teacher to Johann Gottfried Walther)
- Friedrich Wilhelm Zachow (teacher to George Frideric Handel)

== South German organ school ==
=== Overview ===
The tradition of the south was shaped by composers who travelled to Italy or studied under Italian masters. The first important southerner was Johann Jakob Froberger, who visited Italy and France and cultivated Italian idioms in his toccatas (influenced by Girolamo Frescobaldi and Giovanni de Macque) and the French lutenists' style brisé in his harpsichord suites – he was also the first to establish the standard model for the suite, which was later used by both south and north German composers. Froberger's influence was felt all over Europe and extended far into the future: Albrechtsberger, Beethoven's teacher, knew and respected Froberger's work, and a copy of a part of one of his composition exists in the hand of Mozart.

Froberger did not have any significant pupils, but the other important southerner, Johann Kaspar Kerll, did achieve fame as a teacher and influenced numerous composers. Kerll initially studied under Giovanni Valentini, an Italian composer who worked in Vienna; he then travelled to Italy and visited many more regions of Europe. Kerll's influence was perhaps short-lived compared to Froberger's (the most important fact here being Händel's frequent borrowing from Kerll's work), but he was a model for (and perhaps even taught) the Nuremberg-born Johann Pachelbel, whose work is the highest point of the south German tradition.

Typical south German organs differed from their northern counterparts and could have only a dozen or two stops, sometimes a single manual and, occasionally, no pedal; much like many Italian instruments. The music of south German composers on the whole concentrates more on melody, harmonic clarity and sound; genre-wise, Italian models were adopted and resulted in German versions of the toccata, a special brand of improvisatory preludes, and ostinato variation forms: chaconnes and passacaglias. Perhaps the last significant southerner was Johann Heinrich Buttstett, Pachelbel's pupil, who continued the trends set by his teacher but did not achieve any considerable fame; it appears that numerous works by him are now lost.

=== List of composers ===
- Christian Erbach (ca. 1568 – 14 June 1635 in Augsburg)
- Johann Caspar Ferdinand Fischer (c. 1656 – 1746; active in Rastadt, Baden), studied in Paris
- Johann Jakob Froberger (1616 – 7 May 1667; studied under Frescobaldi in Italy, active in Stuttgart and Vienna)
- Johann Kaspar Kerll (1627 – 1693; studied under Valentini, then under Carissimi and possibly Frescobaldi; active in Munich and Vienna)
- Johann Erasmus Kindermann ( 1616 – 1655; studied under Johann Staden, active Nuremberg)
- Johann Krieger (1651 – 1735; active Nuremberg and Zitau), studied under Heinrich Schwemmer and Georg Caspar Wecker
- Johann Philipp Krieger (1649 – 1725; active Nuremberg, Halle & Weißenfels), studied under Johann Drechsel, Gabriel Schütz, and Johann Rosenmüller)
- Christian Michael (c. 1593 - 29 August 1637 Leipzig)
- Georg Muffat (studied under Lully in Paris, then with Pasquini and Corelli in Italy)
- Franz Xaver Murschhauser (1663 – 1738; active in Munich), studied under Kerll
- Johann Pachelbel (studied under Wecker and Schwemmer and possibly Kerll)
- Wilhelm Hieronymus Pachelbel (studied under his father Johann)
- Paul Peuerl (1570 in Stuttgart – disappeared from Upper Austria after 1625)
- Isaac Posch (died 1623 in Ljubljana)
- Ferdinand Tobias Richter (1651 – 1711; active in Lower Austria and Vienna)
- Sebastian Anton Scherer (1631 – 1712; active in Ulm)
- Heinrich Schwemmer (teacher to Nikolaus Deinl, Johann Krieger, Johann Löhner, Johann Pachelbel, J.B. Schütz, and Maximilian Zeidler)
- Johann Speth (1664 – after 1719; active in Augburg)
- Johann Staden (1581 – 1634; active Nuremberg and Dresden), teacher to Kindermann
- Agostino Steffani (studied under Kerll)
- Christoph Stoltzenberg (studied under Deinl)
- Christoph Strauss (1575–1631; active Vienna)
- Georg Caspar Wecker (studied under Kindermann; teacher to Johann Krieger and Pachelbel)

== See also ==
- French organ school
