= Johann Krieger (disambiguation) =

Johann Krieger (1651–1735) was a German composer and organist.

Johann Krieger or Johan Krieger may also refer to:

- Johan Cornelius Krieger (1683–1755), Danish architect
- Johann Nepomuk Krieger (1865–1902), German draftsman and selenographer
- Johann Philipp Krieger (1649–1725), German composer and organist
