= Andreas Kneller =

German composer and organist

Andreas Kneller (variants: Kniller, Knöller, Knüller) (23 April 1649 – 24 August 1724) was a German composer and organist of the North German school.

== Life ==
Born in Lübeck, he was the younger brother of portrait painter Sir Godfrey Kneller. Nothing certain is known about his musical education, though he may have learnt from Franz Tunder (1614–1667), organist of St. Mary's Church, Lübeck, or his own uncle Matthias Weckmann (ca. 1616–1674), organist of St. Jacob's Church, Hamburg. In 1667, he became organist of the Marktkirche in Hanover, succeeding Melchior Schildt (1592–1667). In 1685, he moved to Hamburg, where he became organist of the Petrikirche. It was there that he made the acquaintance of Johann Adam Reincken; he went on to marry his daughter Margaretha Maria in 1686. Kneller's son-in-law Johann Jacob Hencke became his assistant in 1717, and succeeded in him in 1723. Kneller was well respected as a musician, and often acted as an examiner of organs and organists. He was part of the group that examined the candidates for organist at the Jacobikirche, Hamburg, in 1720, which included J.S. Bach (though he did not appear for an audition, he was still chosen for the post but had to decline).

== Works ==
His surviving compositions consist of a few works for organ, typical of the North German baroque toccata form: free passages alternating with fugal sections; this style was described as 'a free way of composition, not subject to any constraints' by Athanasius Kircher (1601-1680), and is thus a sort of stylus phantasticus. These are preludes and fugues in D minor, G major and F minor, originally written in tablature, at the church of Mylau, Saxony. They are published in an edition by K. Beckmann, Wiesbaden, 1987. He also wrote a partita with eight variations on Nun komm der Heiden Heiland (Come now, saviour of heathens) (2 var. published in K. Straube: Choralvorspiele alter Meister, Leipzig, 1907). Three other fragments of preludes also survive. An organ Te Deum attributed to 'A. Kniller' is believed to be the only known work by a different composer by the name of Anton Kniller.

== Sources ==
- Horace Fishback/Ulf Grapenthin: 'Kneller [Kniller, Knöller, Knüller], Andreas', Grove Music Online ed. L. Macy (Accessed 2007-06-07), http://www.grovemusic.com/
- Friedhelm Flamme: notes to recording Organ Works of the North German Baroque III, cpo records 777 246-2

== Scores ==
- Free scores by Andreas Kneller at the International Music Score Library Project (IMSLP)
