= Johann Staden =

German Baroque composer and organist (1581–1634)

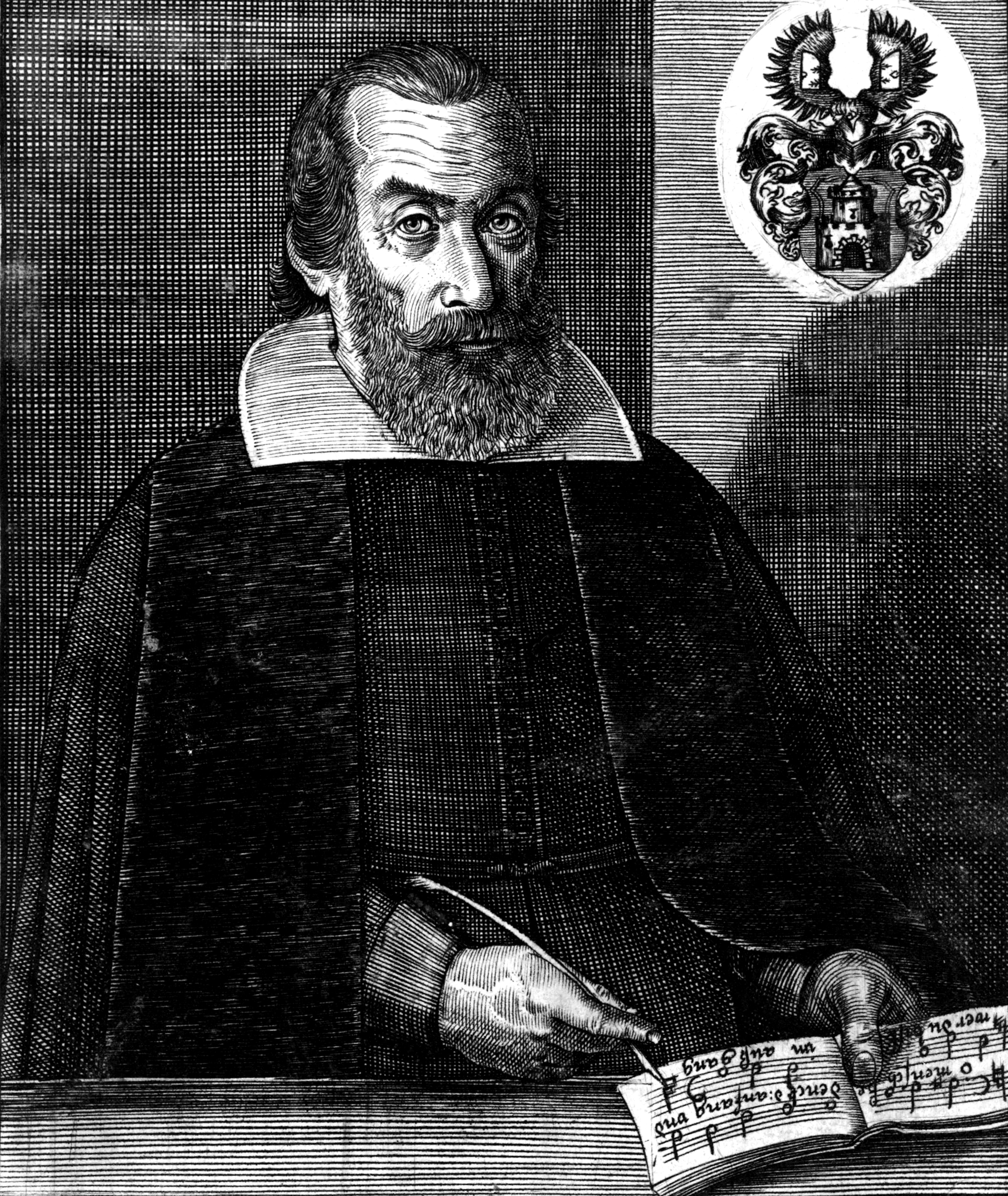
- Staden's only known likeness, a 1640 engraving by Johann Pfann
- Born: 2 July 1581 (baptised); Nuremberg
- Died: 15 November 1634 (aged 53) (buried); Nuremberg

Johann Staden (baptized 2 July 1581 – 15 November 1634) was a German composer and organist of the early Baroque period. He is best known for establishing the so-called Nuremberg School. He was father to the composer Sigmund Theophil Staden.

== Life ==
He was the son of Hans Staden and Elisabeth Löbelle. The exact date of his birth is unknown; it is believed that he was born in Nuremberg in 1581 (the date on the only surviving portrait) and records show that a certain Johannes Starnn was baptised in July 1581. At 18 Staden was already quite famous and serving as organist of one of the city churches; by 1604 he was employed as court organist in Bayreuth; he got married the same year. In 1605 the court moved to Kulmbach, where Staden remained until 1610, publishing two collections of secular songs, Neue teutsche Lieder (1606) and Neue teutsche geistliche Gesäng (1609). He may have visited Bayreuth again in 1610 and returned to Nuremberg by 1611, the year his daughter was baptised there.

In June 1612 he left Nuremberg again to succeed Hans Leo Hassler as court organist in Dresden. He stayed until around 1614/15, becoming organist at Nuremberg's Spitalkirche on 20 June 1616. Later that year he moved to the Lorenzkirche, succeeding Kaspar Hassler. Finally, in 1618 he accepted the most prestigious musical position in Nuremberg: organist at the Church of Saint Sebald (Sebalduskirche). He held that post until his death in 1634.

== Works and influence ==
Much of Staden's work survives in printed collections. His first published works were the secular songs of Neue teutsche Lieder (1606), another Neue teutsche Lieder (1609) and Venus Kräntzlein (1610); the songs feature simplistic rhythms, are harmonically simple and feature little to no imitative counterpoint. The same can be said about his sacred songs, which he also published several collections of. Other sacred music is of considerably greater interest: Harmoniae sacrae (1616) contains some of the earliest German sacred concertos, introducing the concepts of an obligatory basso continuo, independent instrumental accompaniment and the solo concerto to Nuremberg's tradition; these features are also seen in other collections of sacred choral music. The basic style, however, remained that of the motet. Staden's instrumental music consists of around 200 pieces, including not only various dance forms but also some of the first German instrumental sonatas. These pieces could have been written for a group of performers named Nuremberg Musikkränzlein.

Staden was highly acclaimed as a teacher; he was instrumental in creating the Nuremberg tradition and his most important pupil, Johann Erasmus Kindermann, would carry that tradition through Georg Caspar Wecker and Heinrich Schwemmer to the Krieger brothers and, ultimately, to Johann Pachelbel, who studied under both Wecker and Schwemmer. Other pupils of Staden included three of his sons (Johann, Adam and Sigmund Theophil Staden) and miscellaneous lesser Nuremberg composers. Apart from establishing the so-called Nuremberg school through training young musicians, Staden's activities in Nuremberg during the 1620s-30s included evaluating new music dedicated to the city (this included Samuel Scheidt's Geistliche Concerten of 1634).

== List of works ==
- Neue deutsche Lieder samt etlichen Galliarden (1609)
- Venuskränzlein, gewidmet Markgraf Christian von Brandenburg-Bayreuth (1610)
- Harmoniae sacrae pro festis praecipuis totius anni (1616)
- Neue Pavanen, Galliarden, Couranten, Intraden und Canzonen (1618)
- Harmoniae novae sacrarum cantionum (1628)
- Hertzens-trosts-Musica (1630)
- Musicalischer Freuden- und Andachtswecker (1630)
- Trauerlied zum Tode Gustav II. Adolfs von Schweden (1632)
- Operum Musicorum Posthumorum (1643)
- Neue deutsche Lieder nach Art der Villanellen
- Neue teutsche geistliche Gesäng
- Hauß-Music
- Geistlicher Music-Klang
- Davids-Harpfe
