= Christian Ritter =

German composer and organist (17th century)

- Born: c. 1645–1650; Dresden, Saxony, Germany
- Died: After 1725 (aged 75–80)
- Occupations: Organist; composer
- Years active: 1660s–1710s
- Notable work: O amantissime sponse Jesu
- Style: Classical

Christian Ritter (c. 1645–1650 – likely after 1725) was an organist and composer of the North German organ school.

== Biography ==
Ritter was likely a pupil of Christoph Bernhard in Dresden. A notice on one of his works described him as Kammerorganist (chamber organist) in Halle in 1666, although this position does not appear in the records until 1672. In 1677, he was the Hoforganist (court organist). The composer David Pohle was Kapellmeister at Halle during these years. Ritter may have left Halle in 1677, as the role of Kammerorganist was filled by Johann Philipp Krieger that year.

Some years later, he went to Sweden. In 1681, he was mentioned on a record of the Stockholm court, a year later as deputy Kapellmeister. Ritter went back to Dresden in 1683, becoming Kammerorganist and deputy Kapellmeister under Christoph Bernhard. In 1688, he was evidently back in Stockholm as Kapellmeister, remaining there until 1699. According to a detail on a vocal work, Ritter was living in Hamburg in 1704.

In 1717, he described himself in a letter to Johann Mattheson as "Emeritus, who did his part at the royal, electoral and princely courts for more than 30 years in re musica".

== Works ==
As well as more than 20 sacred vocal works, a few organ and keyboard works survive. Best known among his sacred works is O amantissime sponse Jesu, a cantata for soprano and five stringed instruments.

A number of musicologists, amongst them Hans Joachim Moser and Richard Buchmayer, author of the first major study on Ritter, assess his compositions as being of exceptionally high quality.

== Sources ==
- Baselt, Bernd (1993). "Brandenburg-Prussia and the Central German Courts". In Buelow, George J (ed.). The Late Baroque Era. Basingstoke, Hampshire: Macmillan. pp. 230–253. ISBN 0-333-51603-6.
- Buchmayer, Richard (1909). "Christian Ritter. Ein vergessener deutscher Meister des 17. Jh.". Riemann-Festschrift. Leipzig. pp. 354ff.
