= Peter Anton Kreusser =

German composer

Peter Anton Freiherr von Kreusser (1765–1831 or 1832) was a German composer.

== Biography ==
Claiming to be of Swabian aristocrat stock, he was born in Lengfurt (today Triefenstein). He began the Anglo-Bavarian branch of the Kreusser [Kreußer] family when he married Anne Rickets in London.

As the younger cousin of the composer George Anton Kreusser (1746–1810), who was a friend and collaborator of Wolfgang Amadeus Mozart, Peter followed George to Paris, where he served as a violinist. The French Revolution brought him to London, where his career as a composer began.

During his time in London he lived at 44 Greek Street. He formed a close association with the Wornum family that extended over two generations and resulted in the Sickert family coming to live in England. In 1823 he returned to Munich, where Maximilian II of Bavaria ennobled him and his descendants and raised him to Freiherr. He died in Munich during a cholera epidemic.

== Compositions ==
He wrote many romantic airs, divertimenti, sonatas and dances for the piano forte. Much of his catalogue was dedicated to friends and associates, amongst them Emily Huskisson, wife of William Huskisson. His Six Waltzes for the Piano Forte in which there is introduced an old German Air, 2nd set, Op. 12, was published in London in 1810. Sixteen published compositions or arrangements by him are listed in the British Library Catalog.
