= Christian Michael =

German organist and composer

Christian Michael (c. 1593 – 29 August 1637) was a German organist and composer active in Saxony.

Born in Dresden, he matriculated at Leipzig in 1609 and succeeded his brother Samuel as organist at the Nicholaikirche in 1633.

His principal work is Tabulatura, darinnen etzliche Praeludia, Toccaten und Couranten uff das Clavier instrument gesetzt (Braunschweig, 1639). With his father Rogier and brothers Tobias and Samuel, he is represented by a single motet in the anthology Angst der Hellen und Friede der Seelen (1623); two other vocal works survive in manuscript.
