= Georg Dietrich Leyding =

German composer and organist

Georg Dietrich Leyding (or Leiding) (German: [ˈlaɪdɪŋ]; 23 February 1664 – 10 May 1710) was a German composer and organist associated with the North German school.

Born in Bücken, close to Nienburg, his father was a riding master in the French lifeguards. Showing an early ability in music, he moved to Braunschweig (Brunswick) in 1679 to study with organist Jacob Bölsche and in 1684 studied briefly with both Johann Adam Reincken and Dieterich Buxtehude in Hamburg and Lübeck. He returned to Braunschweig the same year, where he succeeded Bölsche as organist of the St Ulrich and St Blasius churches after Bölsche's death, and later also became organist of the Magnikirche. Towards the end of the 1680s, he learned composition from the Hofkapellmeister of Wolfenbüttel, Johann Theile. Leyding died in Braunschweig.

J. G. Walther wrote in his Musicalisches Lexicon that he was 'primarily a composer for the organ', but of the 'many extant keyboard pieces' that Leyding wrote, only five are now known, all for organ. Three are preludes, in B♭ major, C major, and E♭ major, which have significant pedal parts; a setting of the chorale Wie schön leucht’ uns der Morgenstern; and a set of chorale variations on Von Gott will ich nicht lassen. They are published in an edition by K. Beckmann as Sämtliche Orgelwerke (Wiesbaden, 1984).

== Sources ==
- Walter, Horst (2001). "Leyding [Leiding], Georg Dietrich". Grove Music Online (8th ed.). Oxford University Press. doi:10.1093/gmo/9781561592630.article.16339. ISBN 978-1-56159-263-0. (subscription, Wikilibrary access, or UK public library membership required).
