= Sebastian Anton Scherer =

German organist and composer (1631–1712)

Sebastian Anton Scherer (3 October 1631 – 26 August 1712) was a German composer and organist of the Baroque era.

Scherer was born in Ulm, where he resided until his death. On 17 June 1653 he was elected town musician, and it was also around that time that he became assistant to Tobias Eberlin, then organist of the famous Ulm Münster. Sherer probably started studying with Eberlin at the same time, later married his daughter and in 1671 succeeded him as organist of the cathedral. Sources disagree on whether Scherer was later appointed organist or simply organ consultant at St. Thomas (Église Saint-Thomas) in Strasbourg, but it was most probably the latter case, since apparently he remained Ulm's cathedral organist until his death in 1712.

Scherer's surviving works are few, as is typical for the era. They include a collection of sacred vocal music (motets, mass movements and psalm settings) somewhat notable for its imaginative word-setting in some of the pieces, fourteen trio sonatas published as one volume in 1680, all of considerable quality, and a two-part volume of organ music. This latter publication exhibits Italian influence, particularly that of Frescobaldi, which was typical for the south German tradition Scherer represented. The first part, written out entirely in tablature, is titled Intonationes breves per octo Tonos and contains 32 short versets, four for each church mode, so that each mode has an intonatio prima (toccata-like, with extensive use of pedal point), secunda (imitative), tertia (toccata-like) and quarta (imitative). The second part contains eight toccatas, all of which are sectional pieces that make heavy use of pedal point and contain much imitative counterpoint as well as free writing.

Other works include sacred and secular vocal music; and there is evidence that a set of lute suites was published in Augsburg, but those pieces are lost.

== List of works ==
- Musica sacra (...) missae, psalmi, et motetti, Op. 1 (Ulm, 1657). For 3-5 voices and instruments.
- Operum musicorum secundum, distinctum in libros 2, Op. 2 (Ulm, 1664). Organ music.
- Traur- und Klaggesan (Ulm, 1664). Secular vocal music for 5 voices and basso continuo.
- Sonatae, Op. 3 (Ulm, 1680). Trio sonatas for 2 violins, viola da gamba and basso continuo.
- Jubilate Deo, O quam mirabilis (vocal works in manuscript sources)

== Media ==
Intonatio Seconda

Intonatio Tertia
