= Ferdinand Küchler =

German musician

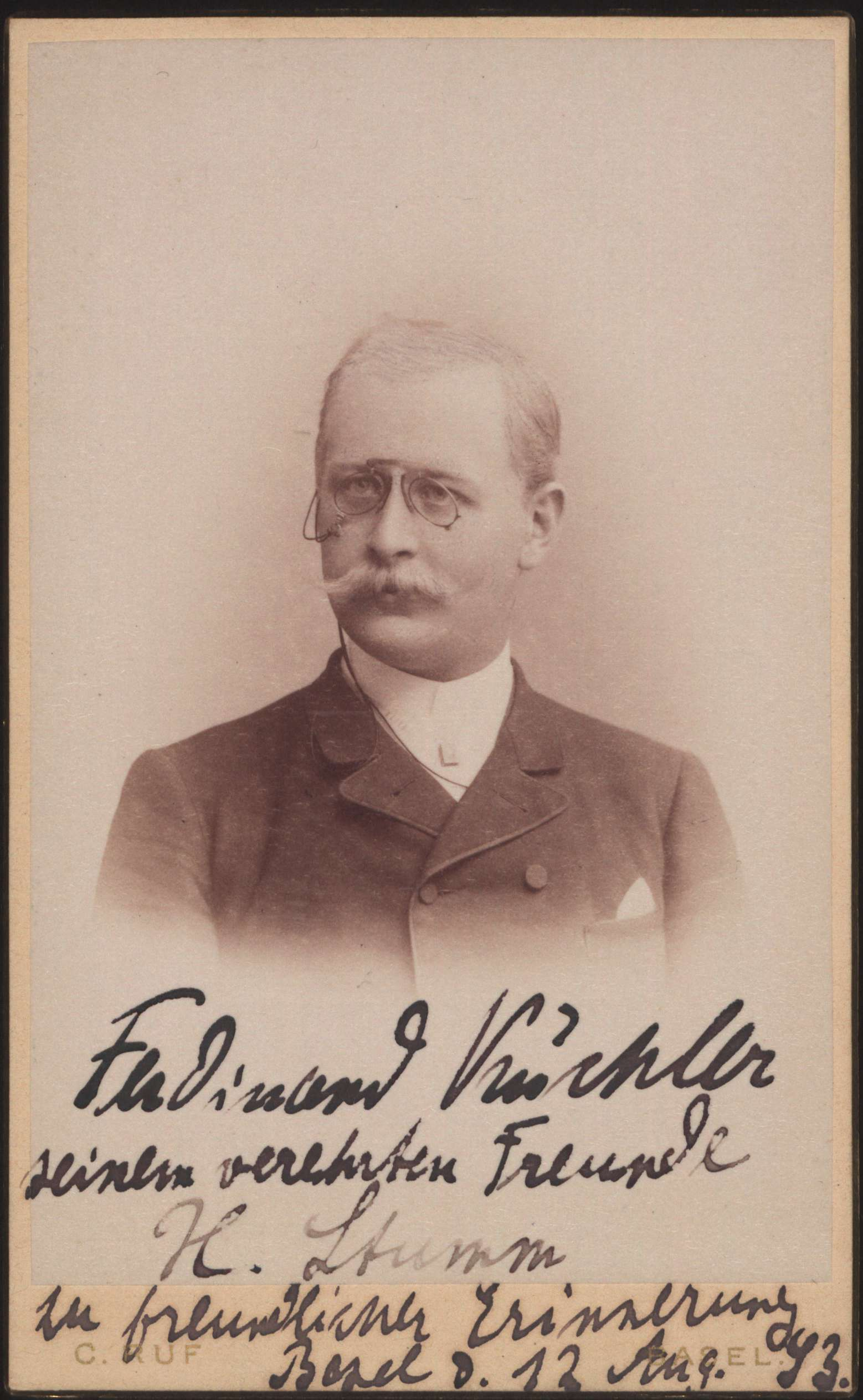
Ferdinand Küchler around 1893

Ferdinand Küchler (14 July 1867, in Giessen – 24 October 1937, in Leipzig) was a German violinist and violist, renowned violin pedagogue, and composer of instructive violin music.

== Life and work ==
Küchler studied violin with Johann Naret-Koning and Hugo Heermann, and music theory with Arthur Egidi and Iwan Knorr from 1883 to 1888 at the Hoch Conservatory in Frankfurt am Main. In 1889 he took his first job as principal violist of the Symphony Orchestra in Basel, also playing viola in a string quartet, and later began teaching violin at the local music school. In 1898 he was appointed a violin teacher at the Hoch Conservatory, and was also violist of the Heermann Quartet led by his former teacher. Küchler returned to Basel in 1910. The following year became director of a private music school and worked as a choral conductor. From 1927 to 1936 he taught violin at the Landeskonservatorium der Musik zu Leipzig (State Conservatory of Leipzig).

Küchler wrote textbooks on violin technique and composed instructive pieces for the violin including several student concertos. His two-volume Course of Violin Instruction (published by Hug-Verlag, Zürich) was a cornerstone of the violin instructional literature until the mid-1960s.

== Works ==
Sortable list of compositions, pedagogical works and literature categorized by genre, opus number, date of composition, titles and scoring.

Genre	Opus	Date	German title (Original title)	English title	Scoring	Notes
Piano			Sechs Walzer und Zwey Eccossaisen	6 Waltzes and 2 Eccossaises	for piano	
Piano			Sechs neue Ansbacher Walzer und 2 Dreher	6 New Ansbacher Waltzes and 2 Spinning Songs	for piano	
Pedagogical			Tägliche Studien für die linke Hand des Geigers	Daily Studies for the Violinist's Left Hand	for violin	published 1900s
	1					
Pedagogical	2	1910–1911	Praktische Violinschule: mit Verwendung von Übungsstücken älterer berühmter Pädagogen: 1. Erste Lage bis zur Einführung in das Doppelgriffspiel, die wichtigsten Bogenstricharten und ihre Ausführung nach modernen Anschauungen; 2. Der Fingersatz auf der Violine: mit vielen Beispielen aus der klassischen und modernen Violinliteratur; 3. Ein Beitrag zur Reform des Violinunterrichts auf Grundlage von F. A. Steinhausen's Werk "Die Physiologie der Bogenführung auf den Streichinstrumenten"	A Course of Violin Instruction: with Application of Exercises of Well-known Masters (Méthode de violon: avec application d'études des maîtres classiques): 1. The First Position to the Introduction of Double-Stop Playing, the Main Bow Stroke Types and Their Transfer to Modern Ideas; 2. Violin Fingering: with Many Examples from Classical and Modern Violin Literature; 3. A Contribution to the Reform of Violin Teaching Based on Friedrich Adolf Steinhausen's Book "The Physiology of Bowing for Stringed Instruments" (1902)	for violin	in 2 volumes, 8 books published 1914
Pedagogical			Chorgesangschule	A Course of Choral Singing	for chorus	published 1915
Chamber music	3		Der Aufstieg vom Volkslied zu den klassischen Meistern: Eine dem Lehrgange der praktischen Violinschule von Ferdinand Küchler sich einfügende und stufenweise fortschreitende Sammlung von Liedern und klassischen Vortragsstücken Heft I: 20 leichte Weisen Heft II: Nr. 21-40	The Progression from Folk Song to the Classical Masters: A Gradual Progressive Collection of Songs and Classical Pieces in Ferdinand Küchler's Course of Violin Instruction	for violin and piano	in 4 books published 1928
Pedagogical	4		Die ersten Doppelgriffe des Violinisten in allen Dur- und Molltonarten	Elementary Method of Double-Stopping in All Major and Minor Keys (Cours élémentaire des doubles cordes)	for violin	published 1928
	5					
Pedagogical	6		100 Etüden für die Anfangs- und Mittelstufe des Violinspiels	100 Etudes for the Violin (Elementary and Intermediate Grades) (100 Études pour le violon (Degrés élémentaire et moyen))	for violin	published 1929
Pedagogical	7		Tonleitern, Lagenwechsel, Dreiklänge	Scales, Shifting, Arpeggios (Gammes, changements de position, arpèges)	for violin	published 1933
	8					
Pedagogical	9		Geworfener Strich und Springbogen	Spiccato and Springing Bow (Jeté et sautillé)	for violin	published 1934
Chamber music	10		Die erste Freude am Zusammenspiel (Erstes Zusammenspiel): 40 ganz leichte Stücke in der ersten Lage	The First Joys of Ensemble Playing: 40 Very Easy Pieces in the First Position	for violin (or violin ensemble) and piano	published 1932
Chamber music			Blumenlese für angehende Violinisten, 24 Stücke nach Volksweisen und nach Beethoven, Weber, Dittersdorf, Reissinger, Donizetti	Anthology for Aspiring Violinists, 24 Pieces after Folk Songs and after Beethoven, Weber, Dittersdorf, Reissinger and Donizetti	for violin and piano	published 1929
Pedagogical			Lehrbuch der Bogenführung auf der Violine	Textbook of Violin Bowing	for violin	published 1929
Pedagogical			Lehrbuch der Technik des linken Armes	The Technique of the Left Arm: a Tutor (Traité de la technique violonistique du bras gauche)	for violin	published 1931
Chamber music	11		Concertino G-Dur (1. Lage)	Concertino in G major (1st Position)	for violin and piano	published 1934
Literature			Goethes Musikverständnis	Goethe's Understanding of Music		published 1935
Concertante	12		Concertino D-Dur (1. und 3. Lage)	Concertino in D major (1st and 3rd Position)	for violin and orchestra (or piano)	published 1936
Pedagogical	13		Intonations- und Triller-Studien: eine Ergänzung zu jeder Violinschule	Exercises for Intonation and Trills: a Supplement to Every School of Violin-Playing (Exercices d'intonation et de trilles: Complément à toute méthode de violon)	for violin	published 1936
Chamber music	14		Concertino D-dur (I. Lage)	Concertino in D major (1st Position)	for violin and piano	published 1937
Concertante	15		Concertino im Stil von Antonio Vivaldi D-Dur, Schülerkonzert (1. und 3. Lage)	Concertino in the Style of Antonio Vivaldi in D major, Student Concerto (1st and 3rd Position)	for violin and orchestra (or piano)	published 1937
