= Wornum =

Wornum is a surname, which may refer to

- George Grey Wornum (1888–1957), British architect
- Michael Wornum (1925–1995), British-born American politician
- Ralph Nicholson Wornum (1812–1877), English art historian, son of Robert
- Robert Wornum (1780–1852), English piano maker, father of Ralph
