= Melchior Schildt =

German composer and organist

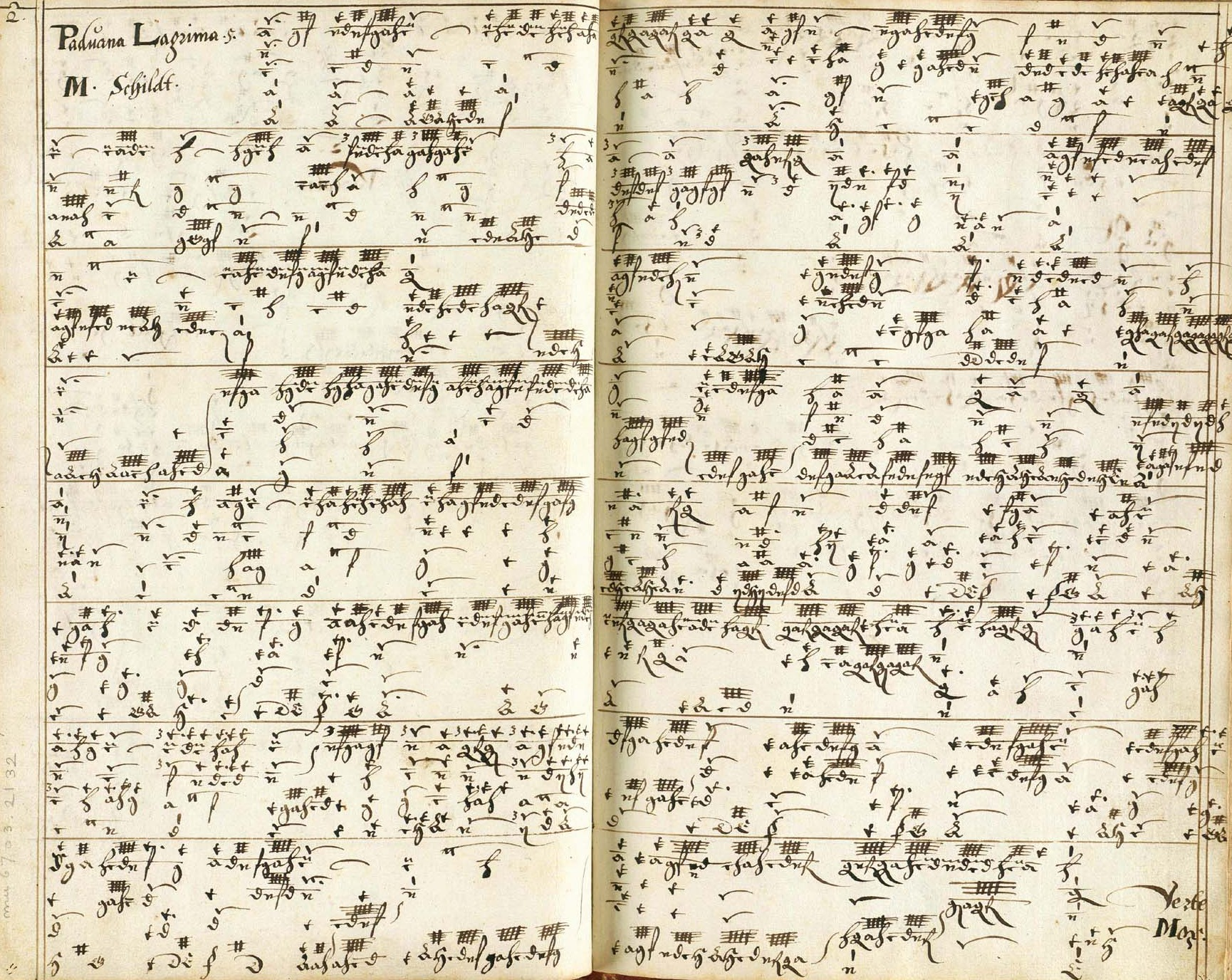
Variations on Paduana Lachrimae by Melchior Schildt

Melchior Schildt (born 1592 or 1593, Hanover – 18 May 1667) was a German composer and organist of the North German Organ School. He came from a long line of church musicians who had served the town of Hanover for over 125 years. He studied with Jan Pieterszoon Sweelinck from 1609 to 1612, and in 1629 replaced his recently deceased father as organist at the Marktkirche in Hanover, where he remained until his death.

== Works ==
The Sämtliche Orgelwerke (Complete organ works) edited by Klaus Beckmann is published by Schott (Mainz 2003. ISMN: M 001-13431-6) as vol. 5 of the series Meister der norddeutschen Orgelschule. It contains the following:

- Herr Christ, der einig Gottessohn on "Herr Christ, der einig Gotts Sohn"
- Herzlich lieb hab' ich dich, o mein Herr on the hymn by Martin Schalling
- Magnificat, primi modi
- Praeambulum g-Moll
- Praeambulum G-Dur
- Allein Gott in der Höh' sei Ehr' on the hymn by Decius
