= Heinrich Schwemmer =

German music teacher and composer

Heinrich Schwemmer (28 March 1621 – 31 May 1696) was a German music teacher and composer.

He was born in Gumpertshausen bei Hallburg, Lower Franconia, and moved with his mother to Weimar after his father’s death in 1627, to get away from the Thirty Years War. After his mother's death in 1638, he moved to Coburg, then in 1641 to Nuremberg, where he remained for the rest of his life. He studied music with Kindermann at the Sebaldusschule, and in 1650 himself became a teacher, effectively a Kantor without the title; from 1656 he was Director chori musici along with Paul Hainlein. Along with Georg Caspar Wecker, he taught a generation of musicians in the tradition of the South German school, including Nikolaus Deinl, Johann Krieger, Johann Löhner, Johann Pachelbel, J.B. Schütz, and Maximilian Zeidler. Schwemmer taught singing, while Wecker gave instruction in keyboard playing and composition.

All his known compositions, of which there a considerable number in manuscript, are vocal works: mostly sacred strophic songs for weddings and funerals, with some cantatas and chorale concertos. He was a master of the vocal stile concertato.

== Sources ==
- Harold E. Samuel, 'Schwemmer, Heinrich', Grove Music Online ed. L. Macy (Accessed 2007-06-10) (subscription required)
- Harold E. Samuel: The Cantata in Nuremberg during the Seventeenth Century (Ann Arbor, 1982)
