= Franz Xaver Murschhauser =

German composer and theorist

Franz Xaver Anton Murschhauser (1 July 1663 – 6 January 1738) was a German composer and theorist.

He was born in Saverne (then under the Holy Roman Empire) but he is first mentioned as a singer and instrumentalist at St Peter's School in Munich, in 1676. He studied music with the Kantor, Siegmund Auer and, from 1683 to his death in 1693, Johann Caspar Kerll. Murchhauser was appointed music director of the Munich Frauenkirche in 1691, where he remained until his death.

== Works ==
He published two collections of organ music in the tradition of the South German school, intended for use with the Catholic liturgy; these consist of short toccatas, fantasies and fugues written using the psalm tones and plainchant melodies.

The first collection is entitled Octi-tonium novum organicum, octo tonis ecclesiasticis, ad Psalmos, & magnificat (Augsburg, 1696), and contains 89 pieces.

The second collection is in two parts of 34 pieces each, entitled Prototypon longo-breve organicum; (part I, Nuremberg, 1703; part II, Nuremberg, 1707). Both may be found in Denkmäler der Tonkunst in Bayern XXX, Jg.xviii (1917).

There are other keyboard works in the Österreichische Nationalbibliothek, Vienna, and the Sing-Akademie zu Berlin. Like Operis Organici Tripartiti Pars Secvnda Complectens Arias octo, cum annexis ad maiorem Delectationem diversimodis Variationibus nec non Pro Tempore Natalis Domini Cantilenas aliquot sive Arias Pastorales, compluribus aeque Variationibus luculenter amplificatas et diductas Authore Francisco Xaverio Murschhavser Opus Septimum (1714), for harpsichord or organ.

A surviving accompanied vocal work, Vespertinus latriae et hyperduliae cultus (Ulm, 1700), contains ten psalms and one laudate.

He also published two works on the subject of music theory, designed for instruction in the art of composition: Fundamentalische kurz- und bequeme Handleitung sowohl zur Figural als Choral Music (Munich, 1707), and Academia musico-poetica bipartita, oder Hohe Schul der musicalischen Compositions, part I [there is no part II] (Nuremberg, 1721). These treatises are conservative and distinctly 'old-fashioned' in their treatment of the subject, and were strongly attacked by Johann Mattheson in his Critica musica due to their firmly being founded on the contrapuntal practice of late-16th century sacred music, while Mattheson was in favour of the 'modern', Italian opera-influenced style.

== Media ==
Hail Little Jesus
Performed by Sylvia Kind on a harpsichord of the type made in the early 20th century

== Sources ==
- George J. Buelow, 'Murschhauser, Franz Xaver', Grove Music Online ed. L. Macy (Accessed 2007-06-10), http://www.grovemusic.com/
