= Johann Steffens =

German organist and composer

- Born: 1560
- Died: 1616
- Instrument: organ

Johann Steffens (1560–1616) was a German organist and composer. He was born in Itzehoe, and died in Lüneburg.

Aside from organ works his works include five-part German madrigals (1619) influenced by Hassler.

== Selected recordings ==
- North German Organ Baroque Volume 4 CPO
- German madrigals. Himlische Cantorey, Hamburger Ratsmusik, Simone Eckert CPO 2013
