= Johann Erasmus Kindermann =

German organist and composer (1616–1655)

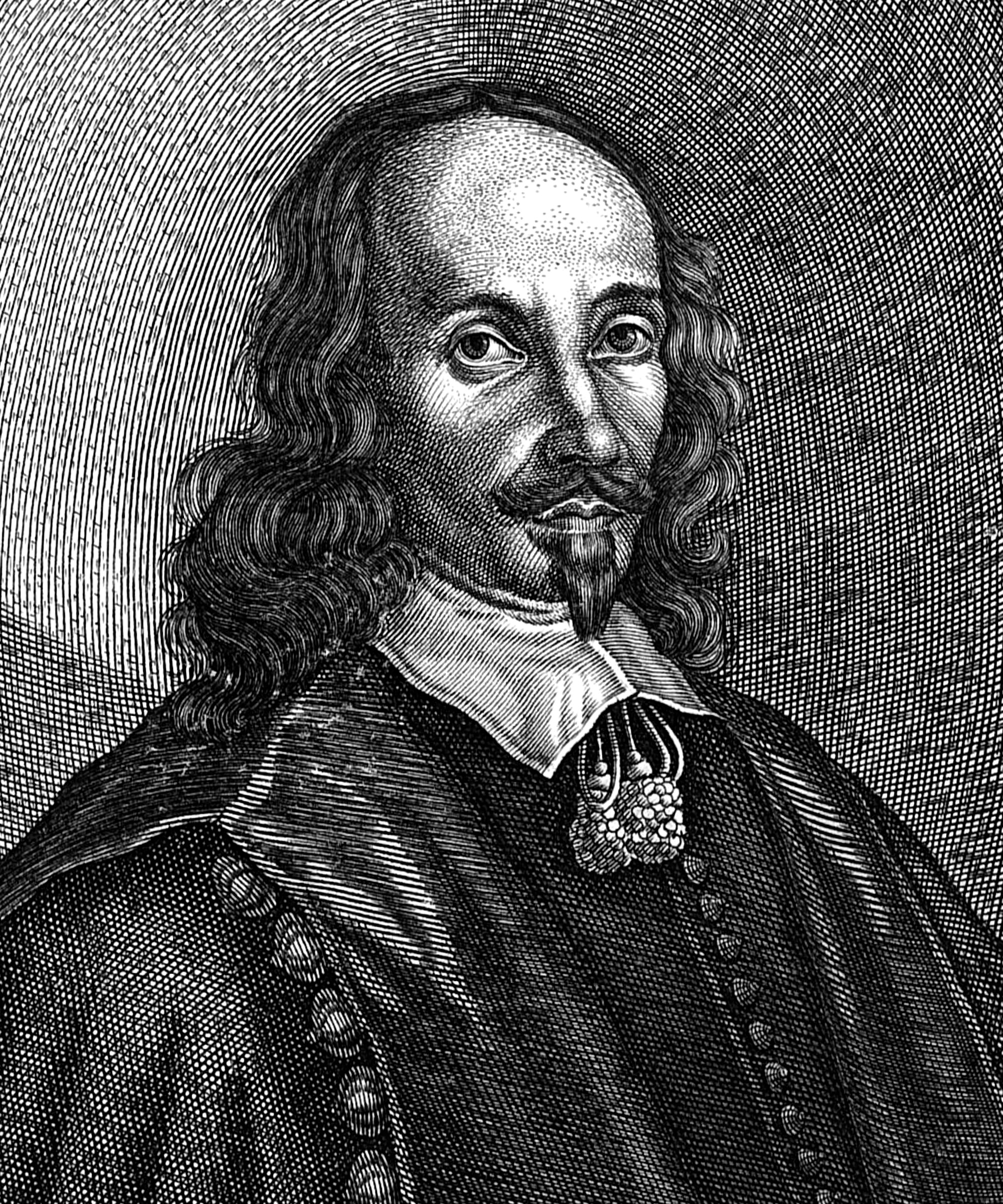
- Engraving of Kindermann; by Johann Friedrich Fleischberger, c. 1655
- Born: 29 March 1616; Nuremberg, Free Imperial City of Nuremberg, Holy Roman Empire
- Died: 14 March 1655 (aged 38); Nuremberg, Free Imperial City of Nuremberg, Holy Roman Empire
- Occupations: Organist; composer
- Years active: 1630s–1655
- Era: Baroque
- Employers: Frauenkirche, Nuremberg; St. Egidien, Nuremberg
- Style: Classical

Johann Erasmus Kindermann (29 March 1616, Nuremberg – 14 April 1655, Nuremberg) was a German organist and composer. He became part of what is called "the Nuremberg school" of composition under the aegis of its effective founder, Johann Staden (1581–1634), who was also Kindermann's teacher. Other musicians associated with this school include Hans Leo Hassler, Jakob Hassler, Kasper Hassler, Johann Pachelbel, Sigmund Theophil Staden, and Georg Caspar Wecker.

== Biography ==
Kindermann was the child of a comb-maker named Hans Kindermann and his wife Ursula (née Gebel). No records survive concerning Kindermann's general schooling. In later life, Kindermann mentions in letters that he had music lessons with Johann Staden. By the time he was 15 years old, Kindermann was earning four gulden per year participating in Sunday-afternoon concerts at Nuremberg's Frauenkirche, both as a bass singer and as a violinist, and he continued to do so until about 1634.

1634 was the year that the municipality agreed to pay for Kindermann to travel to Italy in order to learn about the music there. Then, in January 1636, he was appointed to the post of second organist at the Frauenkirche, a position he held until early 1640. In that year, the Nuremberg council appointed him organist at St. Egidien, a position he retained until his death in 1655. However, letters and manuscript scores for large-scale concerted works reveal Kindermann's interest in establishing himself outside Nuremberg. In these sources, we find evidence of applications for posts in Augsburg and Frankfurt am Main following the Thirty Years' War, but he was unsuccessful in these attempts.

Kindermann became an influential teacher, and his pupils included Johann Agricola, Augustin Pfleger, Heinrich Schwemmer and Georg Caspar Wecker. Kindermann was also instrumental in spreading new music in Nuremberg and south Germany, publishing not only several collections of his own music, but also works by Giacomo Carissimi, Girolamo Frescobaldi and Tarquinio Merula.

== Works ==
Verse 6 of Magnificat from Harmonia Organica
Performed by Ulrich Metzner at St. Ulrich and Afra Church, Feuchtwangen, 2009

=== Instrumental music ===
- n.d. [lost] Wer ist, der so vom Himmel kommt, 5vv, insts
- 1640–43. Deliciae studiosorum (4 pts), a 3–5, bc
- 1643
  - [lost] Musicalische Felder- und Wälderfreund, lv, bc
  - [lost] Musicalische Herzentrost-Blümlein, lv, 2 b viols, bc
- 1645. [lost] Frühlings und Sommer freud, lv, bc
- 1652. Neu-verstimmte Violen Lust, 3 viols, bc (Frankfurt)
- 1653. [27] Canzoni, [9] sonatae (2 pts), 1–3 vn, vc, bc

=== Keyboard music ===
- n.d. 30 suite movts, kbd, D-B, ed. in HM, lxi (pub. 1950)
- 1645. Harmonia organica, in tabulaturam germanicam (5 pts)'

=== Vocal music ===
- n.d.
  - Ach bleib bey uns Herr Jesu, 2vv [attrib. ‘J.E.K.’], in Das Jahr ist fortgelauffen (n.p., n.d.)
  - Befihl dem Herren, S, S, B, 2 vn, bc, D-Ngm
  - Herr Gott, dich loben wir, 6vv, insts, D-B
  - Ich will singen, 5vv, insts, ? PL-WRu;
  - Lasset uns loben, 5vv, insts, D-F;
  - Nun wohlauf ihr meine Sinnen, inst acc. to song by G. Neumark, in Fortgepflanzter musicalisch-poetischer Lustwald (Jena, 1957)
  - Turbabor sed non perturbabor, 3vv, insts, Kl, S-Uu;
  - Wachet auf, 4vv, insts, ? RUS-KA;
  - Wer ist, der so vom Himmel kommt, 5vv, insts
- 1639
  - Cantiones [pathētikai], hoc est Ad memoriam passionis ... Jesu Christi (motets), 3, 4vv, bc
  - Sunt hostes, Momique, bonis crebraeque, T, T, 2 va, bc [wedding music]
- 1640
  - Friedens Clag (3 motets), 3vv, bc
  - Göttliche Liebesflamme, das ist Christliche Andachten, Gebet und Seufftzer (Dilherr), S, bc (text only; 2/1651)
- 1642
  - Concentus Salomonis, das ist Geistliche Concerten auss dem Hohen Lied dess hebraïschen Königes Salomonis (Opitz), 2vv, 2 vn, bc
  - Dialogus, Mosis Plag, Sünders Klag, Christi Abtrag, 1–6vv, bc
  - [8] Musicalische Friedens Seufftzer, 3, 4vv, bc
  - Opitianischer Orpheus, das ist [13] Musicalischer Ergetzligkeiten (2 pts) (Opitz), 1, 2vv, 2 vn, vle/bn, bc
- 1643
  - 1 song in Intermedium musico-politicum
  - Dess Erlösers Christi, und sündigen Menschens heylsames Gespräch (dialogue, J.M. Dilherr), 7vv, bc
  - Musica catechetica, das ist Musicalischer Catechismus (12 motets), 5vv, bc
- 1647
  - Dum tot carminibus te lugent undique cives (L. Röselius) T ‘in stylo recitativo’ , Was ist unser Lebensstand? (J.G. Schwingshärle), C or T, bc [both on the death of M. Lunssdörffer]
  - Lobgesang über den Frewdenreichen Geburtstag ... Jesu Christi, 4vv, sampt 1 Sinfonia, a 4 (1647)
- 1650
  - Eines Christglaubigen Bekenners Hertzens Seuffzere, 2vv, 3 viols, bc (1648)* Musicalische Friedens Freud (14 strophic songs), 1, 2vv, 3 viols, bc
  - Von Gottes milder Vatters-Hand, 2vv [wedding-song]
- 1651
  - Fahr hin, Gottfried, du Friedens Sohn, 4vv [on the death of G. Polycarp]
  - Ich hab ein guten Kampff gekämpfft, 6vv [on the death of T. Peller]
- 1652. Erster Teil J.M. Dilherrns Evangelische Schlussreimen (3 pts), 1–3vv, bc
- 1654. Ich hab ein guten Kampff gekämpfft, 1v, 4 viols, bc [on the death of A.C. von Rägnitz]
