= St. Sebaldus Church, Nuremberg =

St. Sebaldus Church
- Sebalduskirche
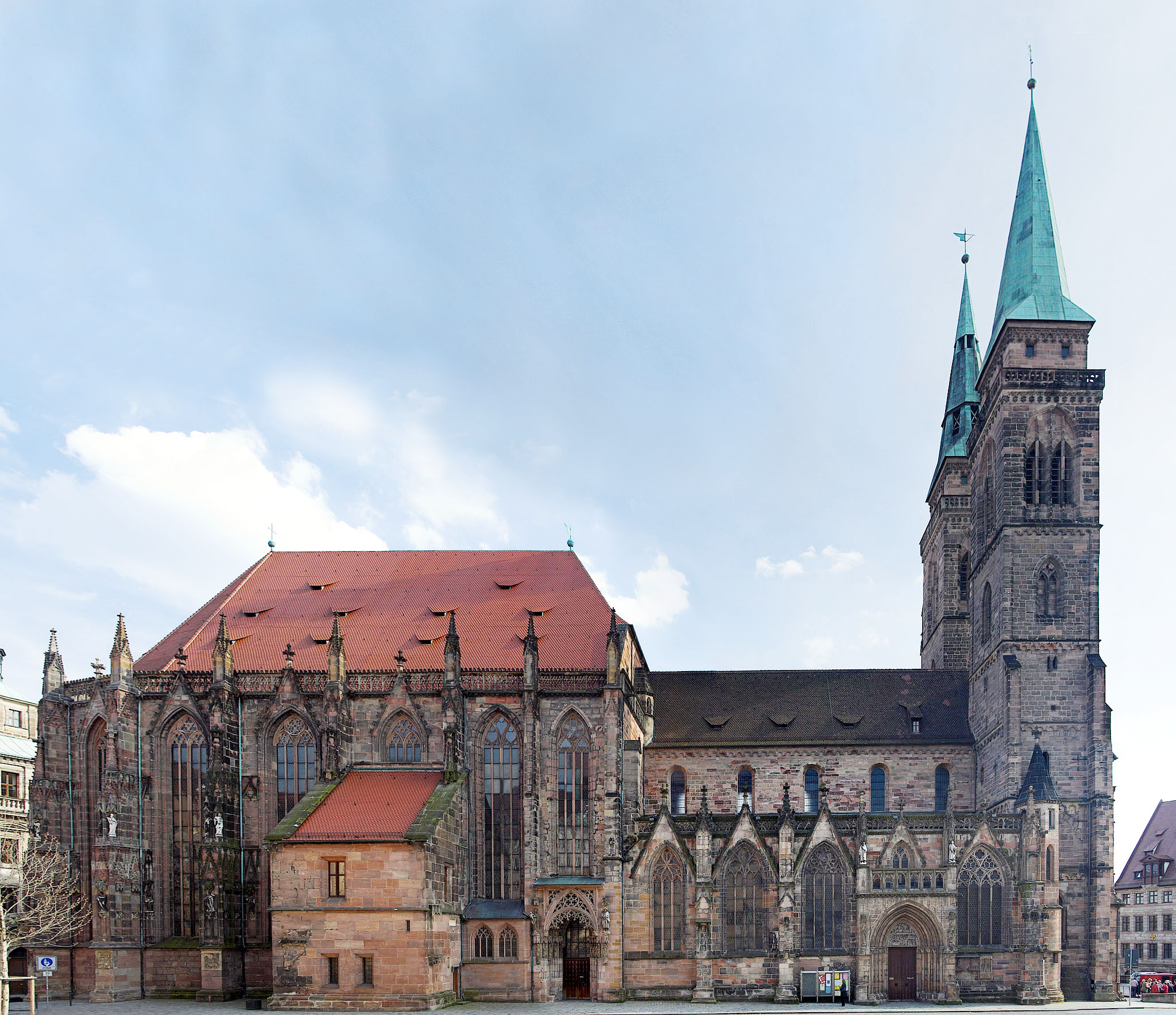
- northern facade

- Location within Bavaria Location within Germany
- 49°27′19″N 11°4′35″E
- Location: Nuremberg
- Country: Germany
- Denomination: Lutheran
- Previous denomination: Catholic
- Website: www.sebalduskirche.de

History
- Status: Parish church
- Founded: 1225 (building); 1255 (parish)

Architecture
- Functional status: Active
- Style: Romanesque (original building); Gothic

Administration
- Division: Evangelical Lutheran Church in Bavaria

St. Sebaldus Church (St. Sebald, Sebalduskirche) is a medieval church in Nuremberg, Germany. Along with Frauenkirche (Our Lady's Church) and St. Lorenz, it is one of the most important churches of the city, and also one of the oldest. It is located at the Albrecht-Dürer-Platz, in front of the old city hall. It takes its name from Sebaldus, an 8th-century hermit and missionary and patron saint of Nuremberg. It has been a Lutheran parish church since the Reformation.

== History ==
The construction of the building began in 1225. the church achieved parish church status in 1255 and was completed by 1273–75. It was originally built as a Romanesque basilica with two choirs. During the 14th century several important changes to the construction were made: first the side aisles were widened and the steeples made higher (1309–1345), then the late gothic hall chancel was built (1358–1379). The two towers were added in the 15th century. In the middle 17th century galleries were added and the interior was remodelled in the Baroque fashion. The church suffered serious damage during World War II and was subsequently restored. Some of the old interior undamaged includes the Shrine of St. Sebaldus, works by Veit Stoss and the stained glass windows. In the church the famous epitaph of the Tucher family can be found.

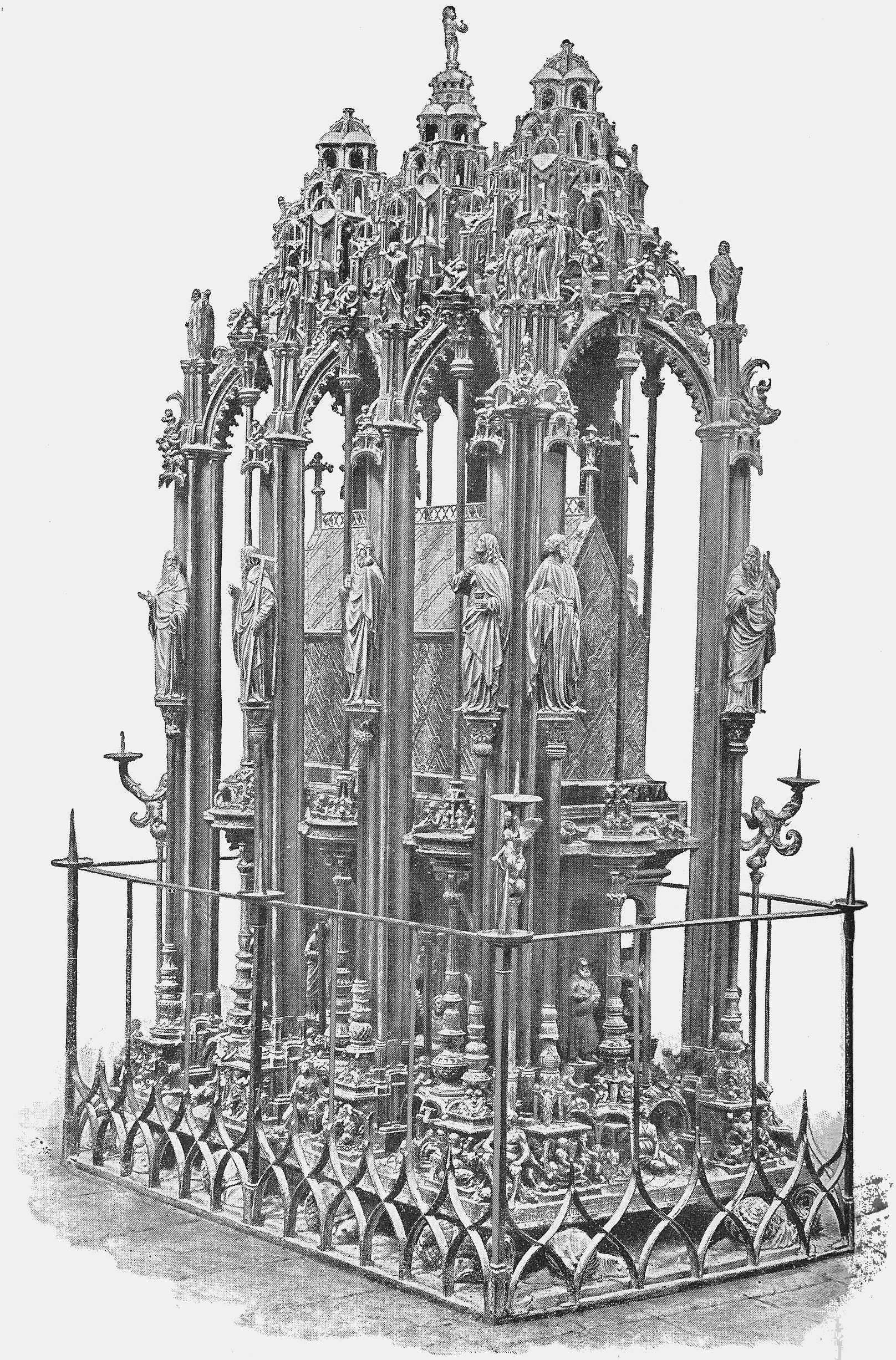
Monument of St. Sebaldus, a work of Peter Vischer the Elder and his sons. Begun 1508, completed 1519

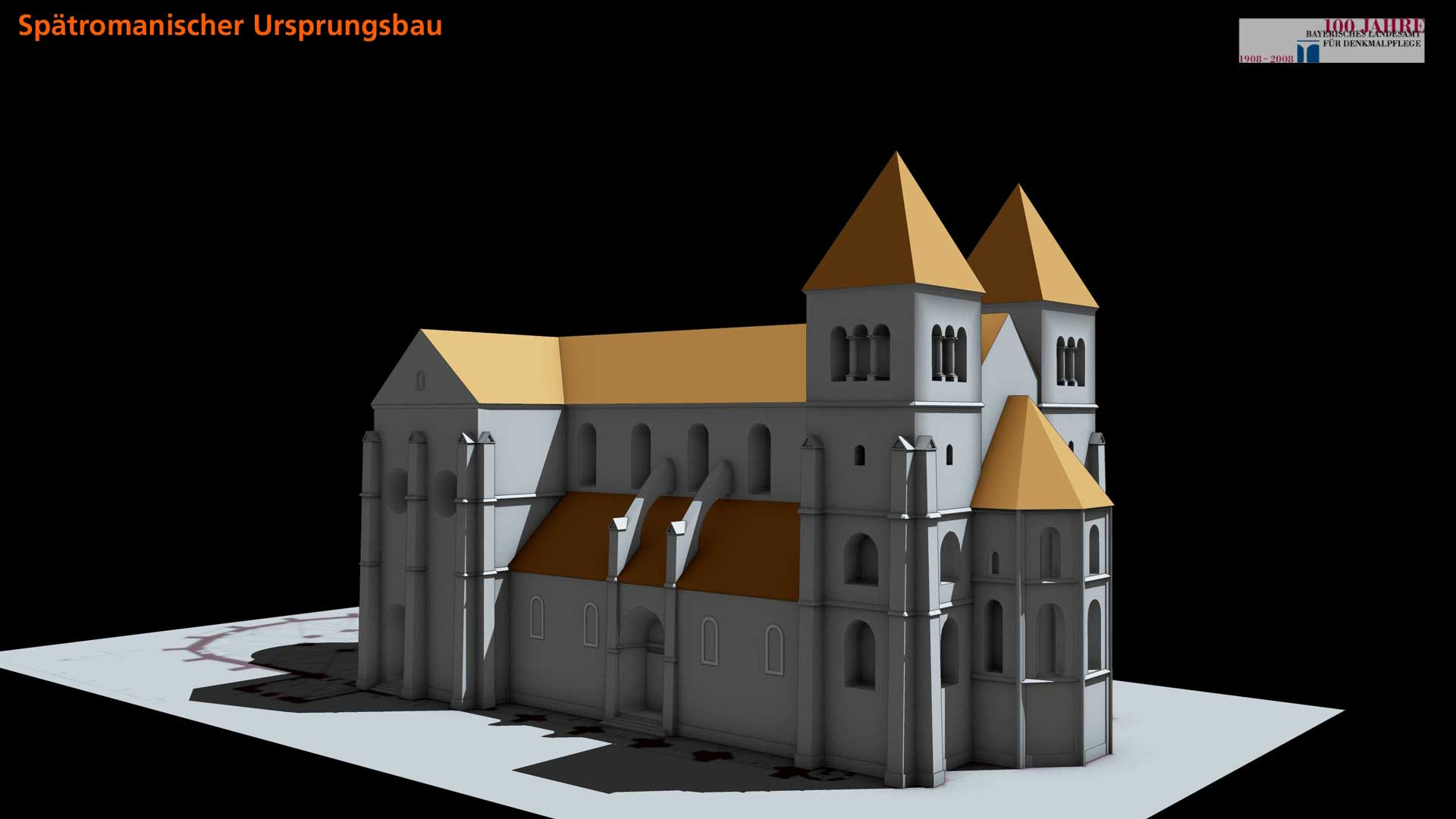
3D historical restoration of the Romanesque-period form of the St. Sebald Church

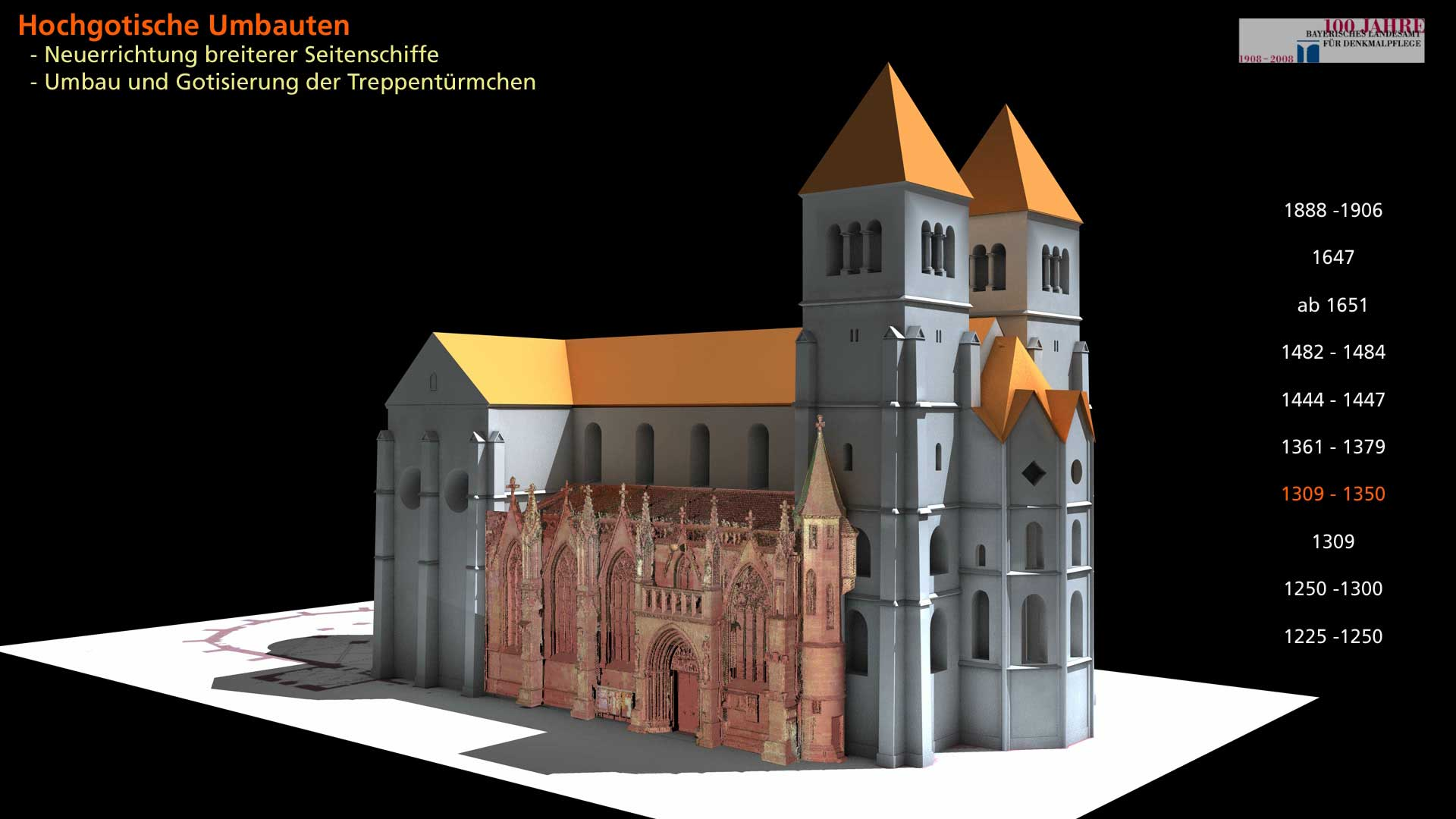
3D historical restoration of the early Gothic-period Saint Sebald Church

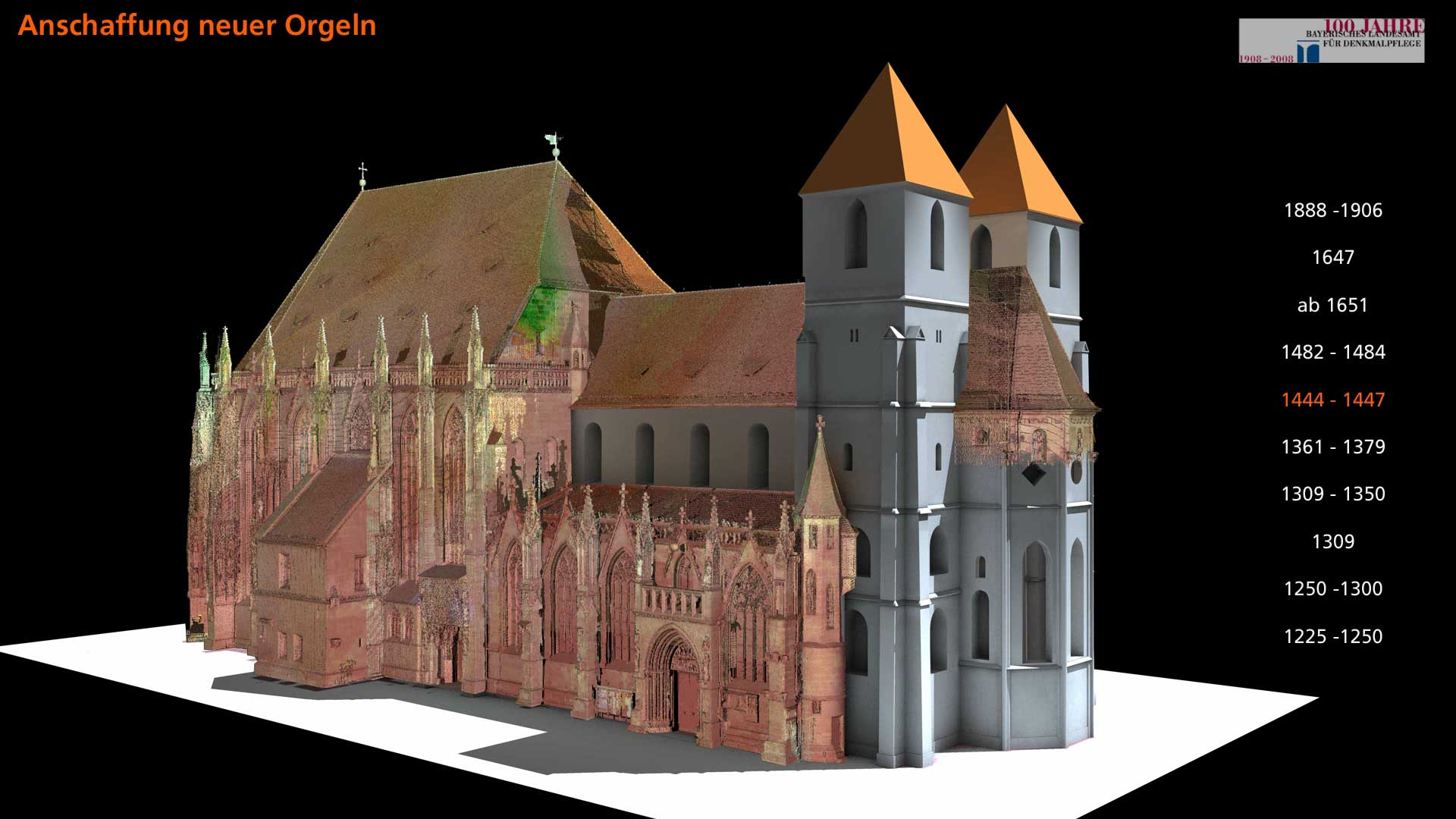
3D historical restoration showing Saint Sebald's late Gothic East Choir addition superimposed on the early Gothic church

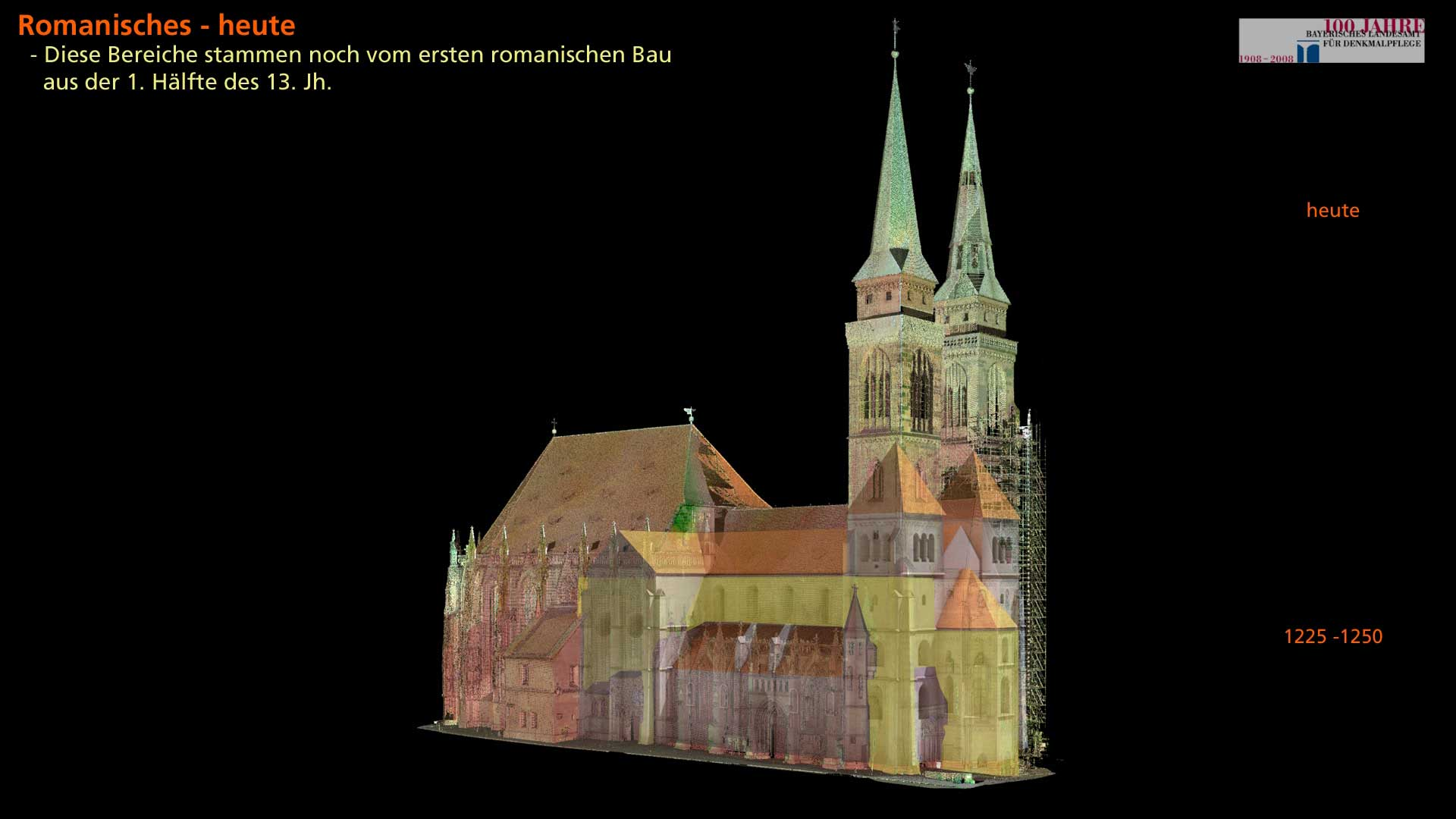
3D historical restoration showing the Romanesque-period Saint Sebald Church superimposed on the current Church

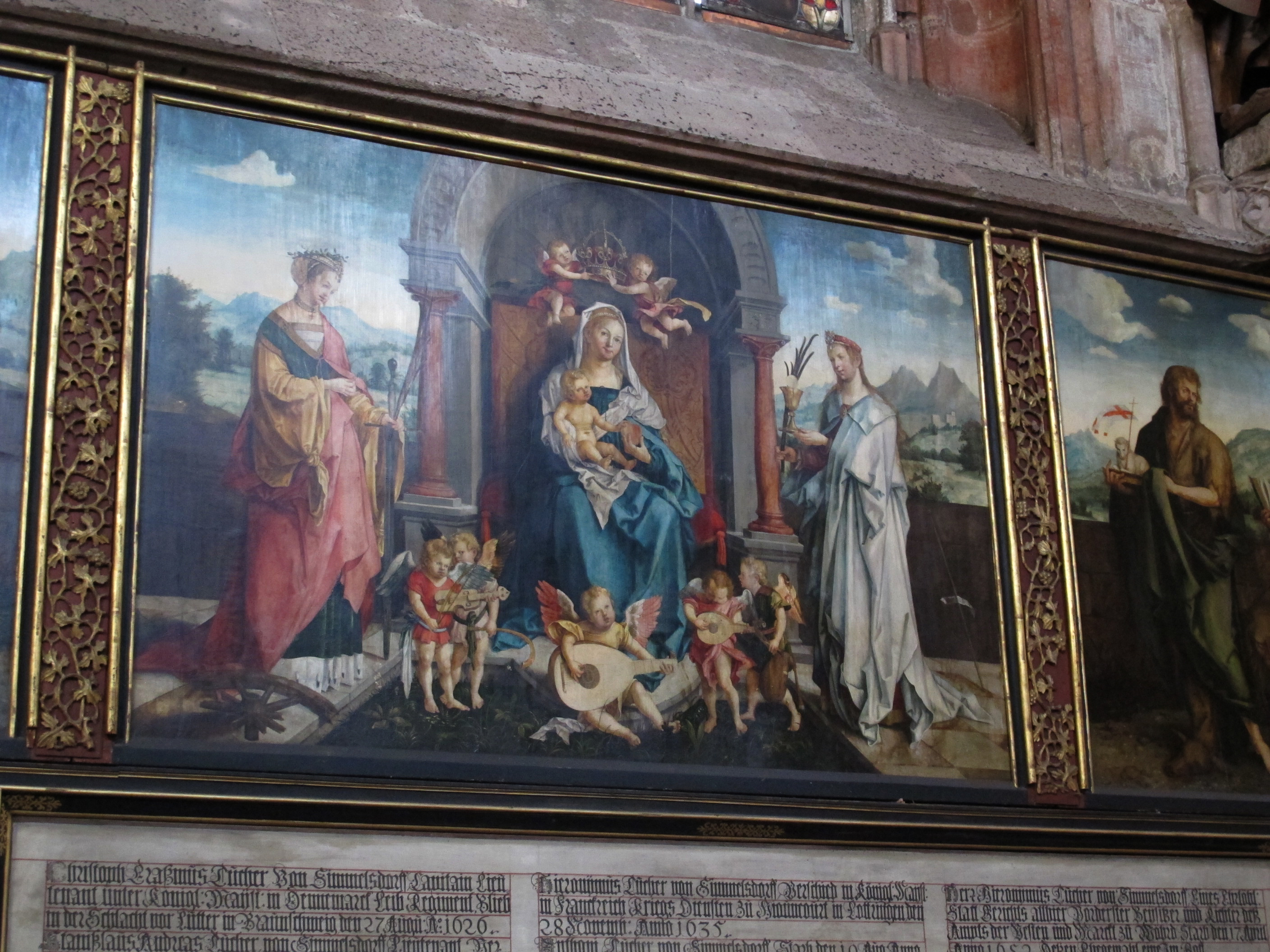
Tucher Epitaph

== Organ ==
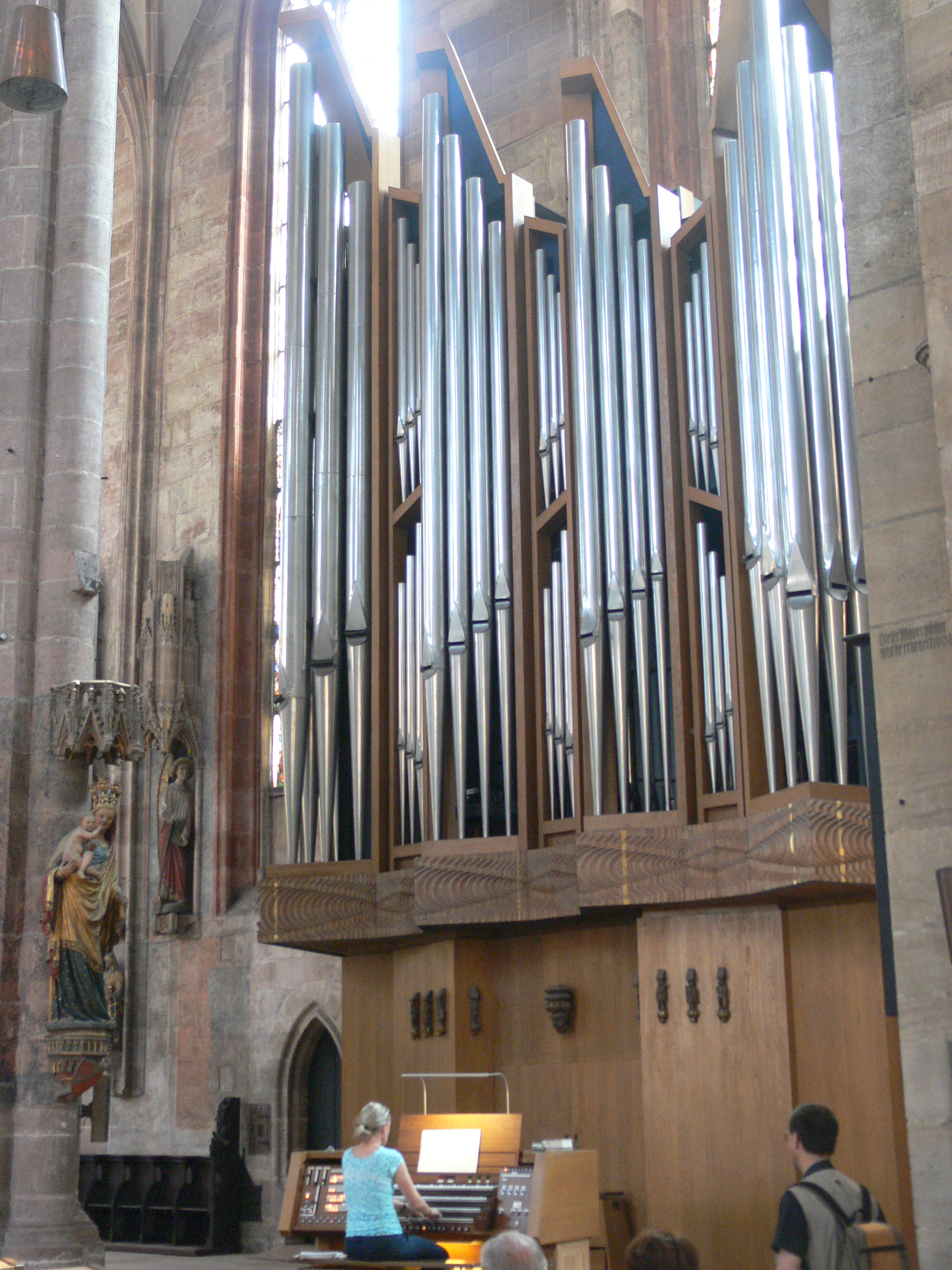
The organ of 1975 by Peter of Cologne

The church had an organ by the 14th century, and another by the 15th. The main organ had been built in 1440–41 by Heinrich Traxdorf, who also built two small organs for Nuremberg's Frauenkirche. The Traxdorf organ was rebuilt in 1691. The modified case was destroyed by the Allied forces during a bombing raid on 2 January 1945.

The new 4 manual, 122 rank, 84 stop organ by Peter of Cologne was installed in 1975.

I Hauptwerk C–a^{3}
Praestant	16′
Bordun	16′
Principal	8′
Metallflöte	8′
Spitzgambe	8′
Großnasat	5^{1}/_{3}′
Octave	4′
Spitzflöte	4′
Schwiegel	2^{2}/_{3}′
Octave	2′
Rohrschweizerpfeife	2′
Kornett V	8′
Hintersatz III–IV	4′
Mixtur VI–VII	2′
Trompete	16′
Trompete	8′
Trompete	4′
Glocken

II Schwell-Positiv C–a^{3}
Rohrpommer	16′
Grobgedeckt	8′
Quintadena	8′
Weidenpfeife	8′
Principal	4′
Rohrflöte	4′
Nasatquinte	2^{2}/_{3}′
Kleinoctave	2′
Überblasender Dulcian	2′
Gemsterz	1^{3}/_{5}′
Kleinquinte	1^{1}/_{3}′
Sifflet	1′
Septnone II	1^{1}/_{7}′
Scharfmixtur IV–VI	1′
Cimbel III	^{1}/_{3}′
Rohrkrummhorn	16′
Voix humaine	8′
Schalmei	8′
Tremulant

III Schwell-Oberwerk C–a^{3}
Nachthorngedeckt	16′
Schwellprincipal	8′
Rohrgedeckt	8′
Flaut d’amore	8′
Flaut lament (Schwebung)	8′
Octava nazarda	4′
Koppelflöte	4′
Terzflöte	3^{1}/_{5}′
Octave	2′
Flute douce	2′
Rohrgemsquinte	1^{1}/_{3}′
Span. Hintersatz III	4′
Sesquialtera II	2^{2}/_{3}′
Mixtur V–VI	1^{1}/_{3}′
Oberton II	^{8}/_{11}′
Fagott	16′
Trompete harmonique	8′
Clairon	4′
Tremulant
Xylophon

Pedalwerk C–f^{1}
Principalbass	32′
Principalbass	16′
Subbass	16′
Gedecktbass	16′
Salizetbass	16′
Octavbass	8′
Bassflöte	8′
Octave	4′
Gemshorn	4′
Doppelrohrflöte	2′
Bauernflöte	1′
Rauschzink IV	5^{1}/_{3}′
Mixtur IV	2^{2}/_{3}′
Bombarde	32′
Posaunenbass	16′
Trompetenbass	8′
Bärpfeife	8′
Feldtrompete	4′
Tremulant

(IV) Chororgel C–a^{3}
Gedeckt	8′
Engl. Gambe	8′
Principal	4′
Rohrtraverse	4′
Octave	2′
Quinte	2^{2}/_{3}′
Mixtur III–IV	1′
Musette	8′
Tremulant

Pedal (Chororgel) C–f^{1}
Pommer	16′
Bassflöte	8′
Choralbass II	4′

- Couplers: II/I, III/I, III/II, IV/I, IV/II, IV/III, I/P, II/P, II 4'/P, III/P, IV/P

=== Organists ===
The position of organist of St. Sebaldus was the most important one of this kind in Nuremberg, and several important composers occupied this post. Organists who worked at St. Sebaldus include the following (almost all held the post until their death, except where stated otherwise):

- 1446–1450: Conrad Paumann, secretly left for Munich
- 1522–1524: Hans Seber
- 1564–1561: Sebald Heyden
- 1567–1571: Hans Haiden
- 1596–1616: Hans Christoph Haiden, dismissed for adultery
- 1616–1618: Kasper Hassler
- 1618–1634: Johann Staden
- 1634–1658: Valentin Dretzel
- 1658–1686: Paul Hainlein
- 1686–1695: Georg Caspar Wecker
- 1695–1706: Johann Pachelbel
- 1706–1719: Johann Siegmund Richter
- 1719–1764: Wilhelm Hieronymus Pachelbel (Johann's son)
- 1764–1775: Cornelius Heinrich Dretzel
- 1783–1810: Egidius Bauer
- 1969–1991: Werner Jacob (left)

== Judensau ==
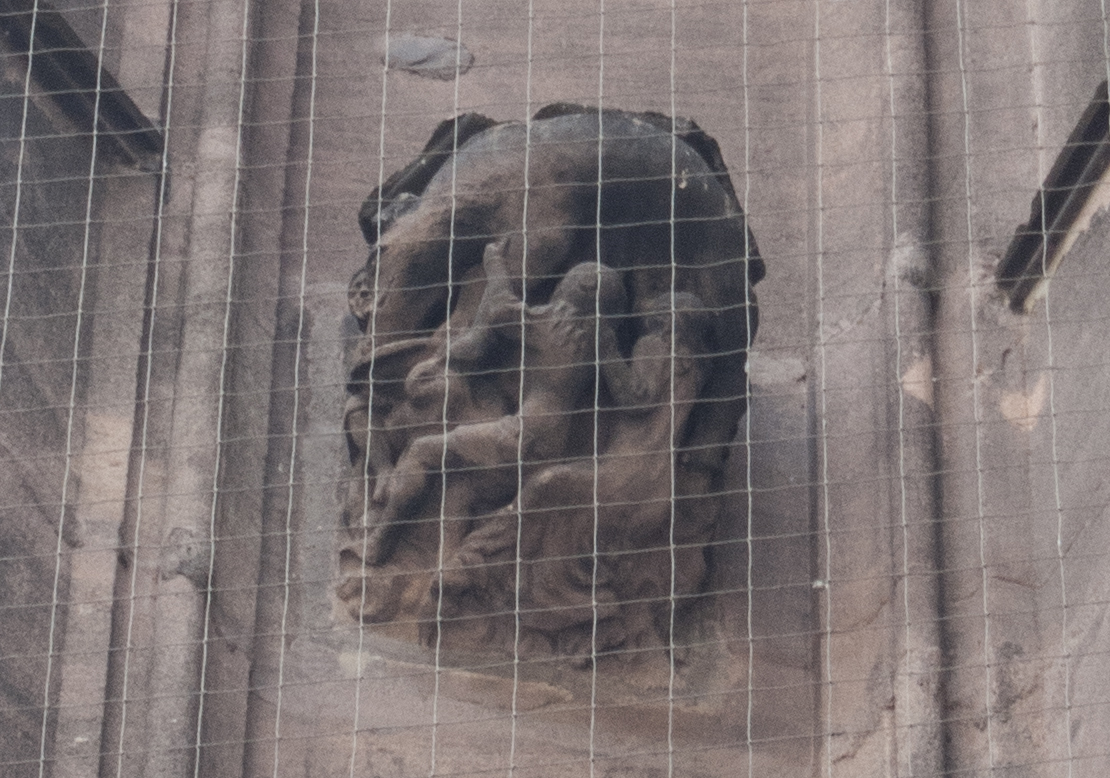
Anti-Jewish sculpture of a "Judensau" (German for "Jews' sow"). Seen from the Rathausplatz.

The church features a Judensau, an antisemitic sculpture depicting Jews engaged in obscene activities with pigs. The Judensau depicts a large sow, with two Jews hanging on the teats. A third Jew is feeding the sow on the left side, while a fourth is collecting the excrement on the right. The sculpture was made in the 1380s and is placed at a height of about 7 meters on the church.

== Burials ==
- Sebaldus
