= Johann Caspar Kerll =

German composer and organist (1627–1693)

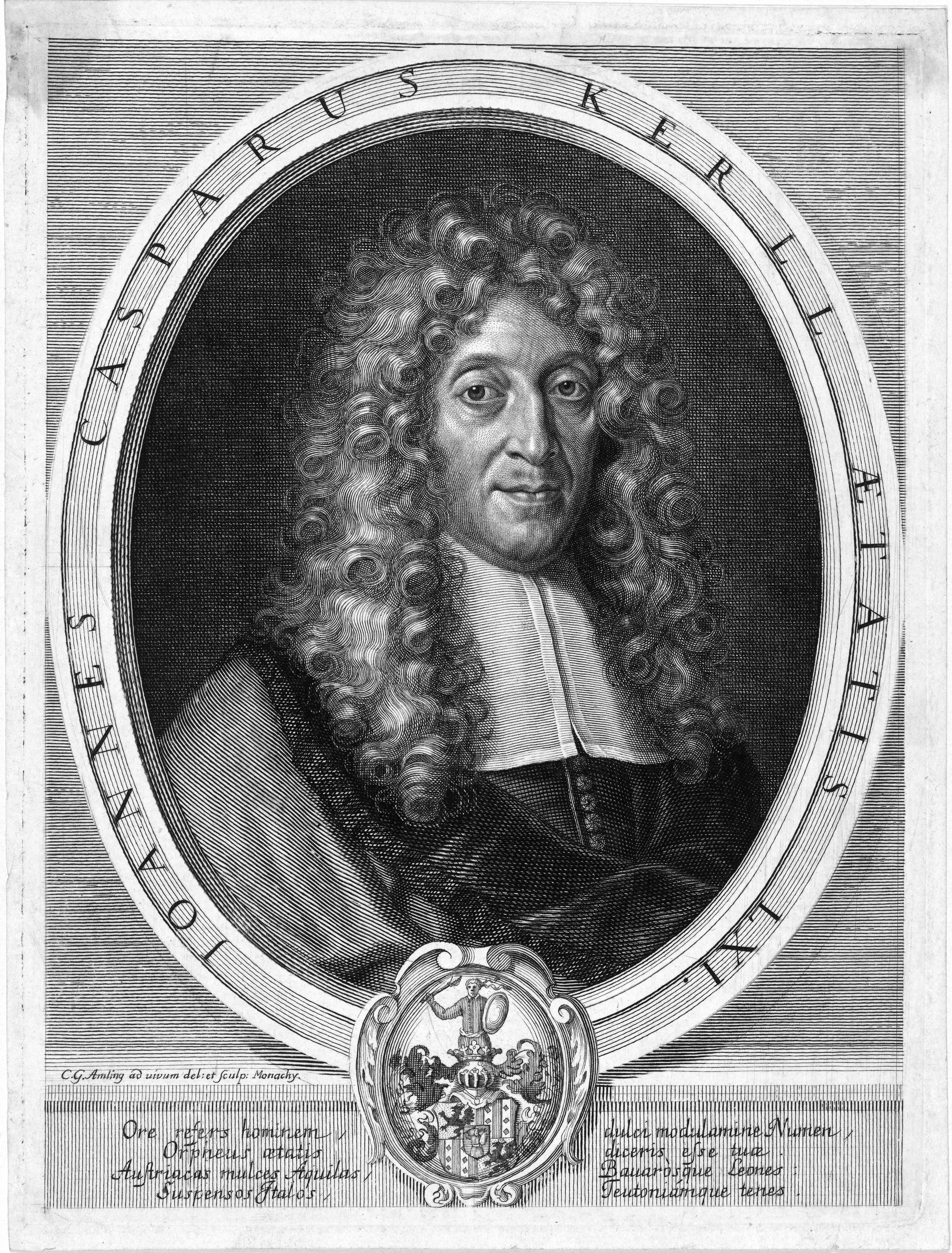
- Portrait of Kerll, made around 1685–1688 during his stay in Munich
- Born: 9 April 1627; Adorf, Electorate of Saxony
- Died: 13 February 1693 (aged 65); Munich, Electorate of Bavaria
- Occupations: Composer; organist
- Years active: 1641–1693
- Era: Baroque
- Style: Classical
- Spouses: Anna Catharina Egermayer (m. 1657; died 1679) Kunigunde Hilaris (m. 1682)
- Children: 8

Johann Caspar Kerll (9 April 1627 – 13 February 1693) was a German Baroque composer and organist. He is also known as Kerl, Gherl, Giovanni Gasparo Cherll and Gaspard Kerle.

Born in Adorf, in the Electorate of Saxony, as the son of an organist, Kerll showed outstanding musical abilities at an early age and was taught by Giovanni Valentini, court Kapellmeister of Vienna. Kerll became one of the most acclaimed composers of his time, known both as a gifted composer and an outstanding teacher. He worked in Vienna, Munich and Brussels, and also travelled widely. His pupils included Agostino Steffani, Franz Xaver Murschhauser, and possibly Johann Pachelbel, and his influence is seen in works by Handel and Johann Sebastian Bach: Handel frequently borrowed themes and fragments of music from Kerll's works, and Bach arranged the Sanctus movement from Kerll's Missa superba as BWV 241, Sanctus in D major.

Although Kerll was a well-known and influential composer, many of his works are currently lost. The losses are particularly striking in vocal music, with all 11 known operas and 24 offertories missing. The surviving oeuvre shows Kerll's mastery of the Italian concerted style, employed in almost all of his masses, and his highly developed contrapuntal technique. He was influenced by Heinrich Schütz in his sacred vocal music, and by Girolamo Frescobaldi in keyboard works.

== Life ==
Kerll was the son of Caspar Kerll and Catharina Hendel (married 1626). He was born in 1627 in Adorf, where his father served as organist of the Michaeliskirche (appointed after building the church organ with Jacob Schädlich). Caspar Kerll probably gave music lessons to his son, who apparently demonstrated exceptional musical abilities; by 1641, he was already composing, and sometime later during the early 1640s, he was sent to Vienna to study under Giovanni Valentini, court Kapellmeister and composer. Kerll's professional career started in Vienna, where he served as organist, and continued in approximately 1647/8, when Archduke Leopold Wilhelm of Austria (then the governor of the Spanish Netherlands) employed him as chamber organist for the new residential palace in Brussels.

During the following several years, Kerll was somehow able to combine travelling with working in Brussels without losing his job. First, Leopold Wilhelm sent him to Rome to study under Giacomo Carissimi. This was around 1648/9; Kerll must have met Johann Jakob Froberger and might have studied with him. Returning to Brussels for a brief time, he left again in the winter of 1649–1650, travelling to Dresden. He also attended the wedding of Philip IV of Spain and Mariana of Austria, visited Vienna several times in 1651 and 1652, and spent some time in Göttweig and Moravia. Abraham van den Kerckhoven substituted for Kerll while he was away and ultimately succeeded him in 1655, when Kerll left.

In February 1656, Kerll accepted a temporary post of Vice-Kapellmeister at the Munich court under Elector Ferdinand Maria. In March, he succeeded Giovanni Giacomo Porro as court Kapellmeister. Kerll's fame started growing rapidly as he was given more and more important tasks. Particularly important of these are his opera Oronte (now lost), which inaugurated the Munich opera house in January 1657, and a vocal mass composed in 1658 for the coronation of Emperor Leopold I in Frankfurt.

While in Munich, Kerll married Anna Catharina Egermayer in 1657. The couple had eight children, but only one of them, the youngest son, pursued a career in music. The Munich years were especially important for Kerll: he was apparently favoured by Ferdinand Maria, who would provide support for the rest of Kerll's life; in 1664 he was ennobled by the emperor; in 1669 his first published works appeared: Delectus sacrarum cantionum, a collection of vocal music, and a Missa pro defunctis, both dedicated to Ferdinand Maria. Kerll gave up his post in Munich in 1673 for unclear reasons – it is believed that there was a particularly serious quarrel with other court musicians (Italian singers) which made him leave. Kerll did, however, maintain contact with Elector Ferdinand Maria until his death.

In 1674, Kerll moved to Vienna. A pension was granted to him in 1675 by the emperor, who in 1677 employed him as one of his court organists. Although it has been suggested that Kerll might have worked at the Stephansdom, there is no proof. If he did, however, Johann Pachelbel would have been his deputy organist there. The 1679 plague, commemorated by Kerll in Modulatio organica, a collection of liturgical organ music, resulted in Anna Catharina's death. He married Kunigunde Hilaris in 1682/3 and stayed in Vienna for the next 10 years, surviving the Turkish invasion of 1683, which he also commemorated in music in Missa in fletu solatium. He visited Munich several times between 1684 and 1692, publishing his Modulatio organica (1686) and Missae sex (1689, dedicated to the emperor) there. At the end of 1692, Kerll relinquished his Vienna position and returned to Munich, where he died shortly afterwards.

== Influence ==
Although Kerll was a renowned teacher during his lifetime, his pupils did not, in all probability, include any considerably important composers, although Johann Joseph Fux possibly studied with him for a time. Agostino Steffani is perhaps his best-known pupil. Kerll's influence on later composers, however, is undeniable. Johann Pachelbel studied Kerll's style, which is particularly obvious from his organ chaconnes, which are reminiscent of Kerll's ostinato works; he may have also studied with Kerll, although there is no proof. The two most important German composers of the late Baroque era, Johann Sebastian Bach and George Frideric Handel, both studied Kerll's work: Bach arranged the Sanctus part of Kerll's Missa superba in his Sanctus in D major (BWV 241), and Handel frequently borrowed themes, and sometimes whole pieces, from Kerll's canzonas (the theme from Canzona No. 6 is taken for Let all the Angels of God from Messiah, Egypt was Glad from Israel in Egypt is practically similar to Canzona No. 4, etc.).

== Works ==
Kerll was highly regarded by his contemporaries: many of his works were published during his lifetime. Particularly important are the many printed concerted masses, a collection of motets and sacred concertos entitled Delectus sacrarum cantionum (Munich, 1669) and Modulatio organica super Magnificat octo ecclesiasticis tonis respondens (Munich, 1686), which contains liturgical organ music. Kerll was not an especially prolific composer, so the surviving works are relatively few. Much of his music was lost, including 11 operas (which he was most famous for during his lifetime), 25 offertories, four masses, litanies, chamber sonatas and miscellaneous keyboard works.

=== Keyboard music ===
The surviving keyboard music is cast in the typical southern German style, combining strict German counterpoint with Italian styles and techniques; Frescobaldi and especially Froberger were the most important influences. Most of Kerll's keyboard works are playable on both pipe organ and harpsichord; the exceptions are four dance suites composed for harpsichord and two organ toccatas: Toccata quarta Cromatica con Durezze e Ligature and Toccata sesta per il pedali. Partial chronology can be established using Kerll's (incomplete) catalogue of his own works, which is included in the 1686 Modulatio organica (it is the earliest surviving thematic catalogue of a specific composer's works): it lists 22 pieces, 18 of which were composed by 1676 at the latest. The earliest known composition by Kerll, Ricercata à 4 in A (also known as Ricercata in Cylindrum phonotacticum transferanda), was published in 1650 in Rome.

Kerll's eight toccatas (that correspond to the eight church modes) alternate between free and strict contrapuntal sections, sometimes in contrasting meters. Frequent use of 12/8 gigue-like endings is similar to Froberger's toccatas. The four dance suites are also reminiscent of Froberger's suites, yet two of them contain variation movements. Kerll's canzonas consist, typically for the time, of several fugal sections; some also have toccata-like passagework embedded in the development of cadences. Two ostinato works survive, a passacaglia and a chaconne, both built on a descending bass pattern; the passacaglia is perhaps Kerll's most well-known work.

The two best known keyboard pieces by Kerll are both programmatic, descriptive pieces. Battaglia is a descriptive piece in C major, over 200 bars long and featuring numerous repeats of fanfare-like themes, it is also attributed to Juan Bautista Cabanilles. Capriccio sopra il Cucu is based on an imitation of the cuckoo's call, which is heard more than 200 times in the piece. It is modelled after Frescobaldi's piece based on the same idea, Capriccio sopra il cucho, but is more structurally and harmonically complex. The idea of repeating a particular theme in Kerll's music reaches its extreme in the Magnificat tertii toni, where a fugue subject consists of sixteen repeated E notes.

=== Vocal and chamber music ===
Kerll wrote numerous non-keyboard works, especially during his Munich years: while he was reviving the court chapel ensemble of the Munich court, Kerll must have composed a wealth of chamber music, and all operas (around 10 or 11) were also all composed in Munich, starting with the Oronte of 1657. Kerll's chamber works include a canzona for two violins, viola da gamba and basso continuo and three sonatas. Most vocal works employ an advanced concertato technique; the requiem mass Missa pro defunctis from 1669, scored for five voices with no accompaniment, is a notable exception. The works of Delectus sacrarum cantionum, motets and sacred concertos for 2–5 voices, are sectional compositions alternating between imitative writing and free, highly ornamented parts. They are reminiscent of Heinrich Schütz's pieces from Kleine geistliche Concerte.

Six of the surviving masses were published during Kerll's lifetime as Missae sex, cum instrumentis concertantibus, e vocibus in ripieno, adjuncta una pro defunctis cum seq. Dies irae (Munich, 1689). The complex imitative counterpoint that dominates Kerll's chamber music is also present in most of his sacred vocal works: in Missa non sine quare every movement ends with a grand fugue, a similar technique is seen in Missa Renovationis (which is almost entirely based on five themes used for the Kyrie movement), where every division of the mass also closes with a large fugal section. Stretto entries of a highly chromatic subject in works like Missa in fletu solatium result in strong dissonances (the mass in question, commemorating the events of a Turkish siege that cost Kerll's friend, Alessandro Poglietti, his life, contains a continuo part that includes an "avoid consonances" warning from the composer).

== List of works ==
=== Published during the composer's lifetime ===
- Ricercata à 4 in A for keyboard instrument – published in Athanasius Kircher's Musurgia Universalis (Rome, 1650)
- Delectus sacrarum cantionum (Munich, 1669), 26 motets for 2–5 voices
- Modulatio organica super Magnificat octo ecclesiasticis tonis respondens (Munich, 1686), Magnificat versets for organ, covering all eight church modes
- Missae sex, cum instrumentis concertantibus, e vocibus in ripieno, adjuncta una pro defunctis cum seq. Dies irae (Munich, 1689), a collection of concertato masses

=== Surviving in manuscripts ===
==== Vocal ====
- Missa a 3 chori
- Missa cujus toni
- Missa nigra
- Missa pro defunctis (1669)
- Missa quasi modo genita
- Missa Quid vobis videtur (1670)
- Missa superba (1674)
- Missa volante
- 3 untitled masses with only Kyrie and Gloria movements, 1 untitled mass with only the Sanctus movement
- 16 sacred works on Latin texts, 3 on German texts
- Pia et fortis mulier S Natalia S Adriani martyris coniuge expressa, school play (Vienna, 1677)
- a secular cantata on German text
- a secular duet on Italian text

==== Keyboard ====
- 11 toccatas (8 a separate cycle, 3 more in another source)
- 6 canzonas
- 5 versets
- 4 suites
- 2 preludes

In addition to these, an assortment of other keyboard pieces survives: a chaconne, a passacaglia, a battaglia, a Capriccio sopra il cucu and an aria with two variations.

==== Other instrumental ====
- Canzona for two violins, viola da gamba and basso continuo
- 2 sonatas for two violins, viola da gamba and basso continuo
- Sonata modi dorii for two violins, viola da gamba and basso continuo
- Sonata for two violins, two violas and basso continuo

=== Lost works ===
- 25 offertories
- 11 operas
- 4 masses
- Other works, including litanies and sonatas

== List of operas ==
- Oronte (Alcaini, 1657)
- Applausi Festivi (1658)
- Ardelia (1660)
- Erinto (1661)
- Antiopa giustificata (1662)
- L'amor della patria superiore al' ogn' altro (1665)
- Atalanta (1667)
- Amor tiranno ovvero Regnero innamorato (1672)
