= Georg Caspar Wecker =

German composer

Georg Caspar Wecker (baptized 2 April 1632 – 20 April 1695) was a German Baroque organist and composer. A minor composer of the Nuremberg school, Wecker is now best remembered as one of Johann Pachelbel's first teachers.

Wecker was born and spent all his life in Nuremberg. He received his first music lessons from his father Johann, and at the age of 15 he was already allowed to play the church organ. From 1651 he served as organist of St. Walpurg, then in 1654 he became organist of the Frauenkirche. Four years later he became organist of the Egidienkirche, the third most important position of its kind in the city. He spent 28 years working there, until in 1686 he got the job at the main Nuremberg parish church of the time, St. Sebald. Wecker occupied this position until his death in 1695 and was succeeded by Johann Pachelbel.

An acclaimed teacher, Wecker was, along with Heinrich Schwemmer, an important link in the 17th century Nuremberg teacher-pupil tradition. Himself a pupil of Kindermann, he taught keyboard instruments and composition to Johann Krieger and Johann Pachelbel. Few of his works survive to this day: several cantatas, some 40 songs and 4 keyboard fugues.
