= Johann Krieger =

German composer and organist (1651–1735)

- Born: 28 December 1651; Nuremberg, Germany
- Died: 18 July 1735 (aged 83)
- Era: Baroque

Johann Krieger (28 December 1651 – 18 July 1735) was a German composer and organist, younger brother of Johann Philipp Krieger. Born in Nuremberg, he worked at Bayreuth, Zeitz, and Greiz before settling in Zittau. He was one of the most important keyboard composers of his day, highly esteemed by, among others, George Frideric Handel. A prolific composer of church and secular music, he published several dozen of his works, and others survive in manuscript. However, hundreds more were lost when Zittau was destroyed by fire in 1757, during the Seven Years' War.

Krieger's keyboard music places him among the most important German composers of his time. The two published collections, Sechs musicalische Partien (1697) and Anmuthige Clavier-Übung (1698), contain harpsichord suites, organ toccatas, fugues, ricercars, and other works. Krieger's contemporaries praised his contrapuntal skill, evident in the extant fugues and ricercars. Johann Mattheson was particularly impressed with Krieger's double fugues, remarking that he knew nobody who surpassed Krieger in this form, except Handel. Handel himself admired and studied Krieger's work, even taking a copy of Anmuthige Clavier-Übung with him to England.

== Life ==
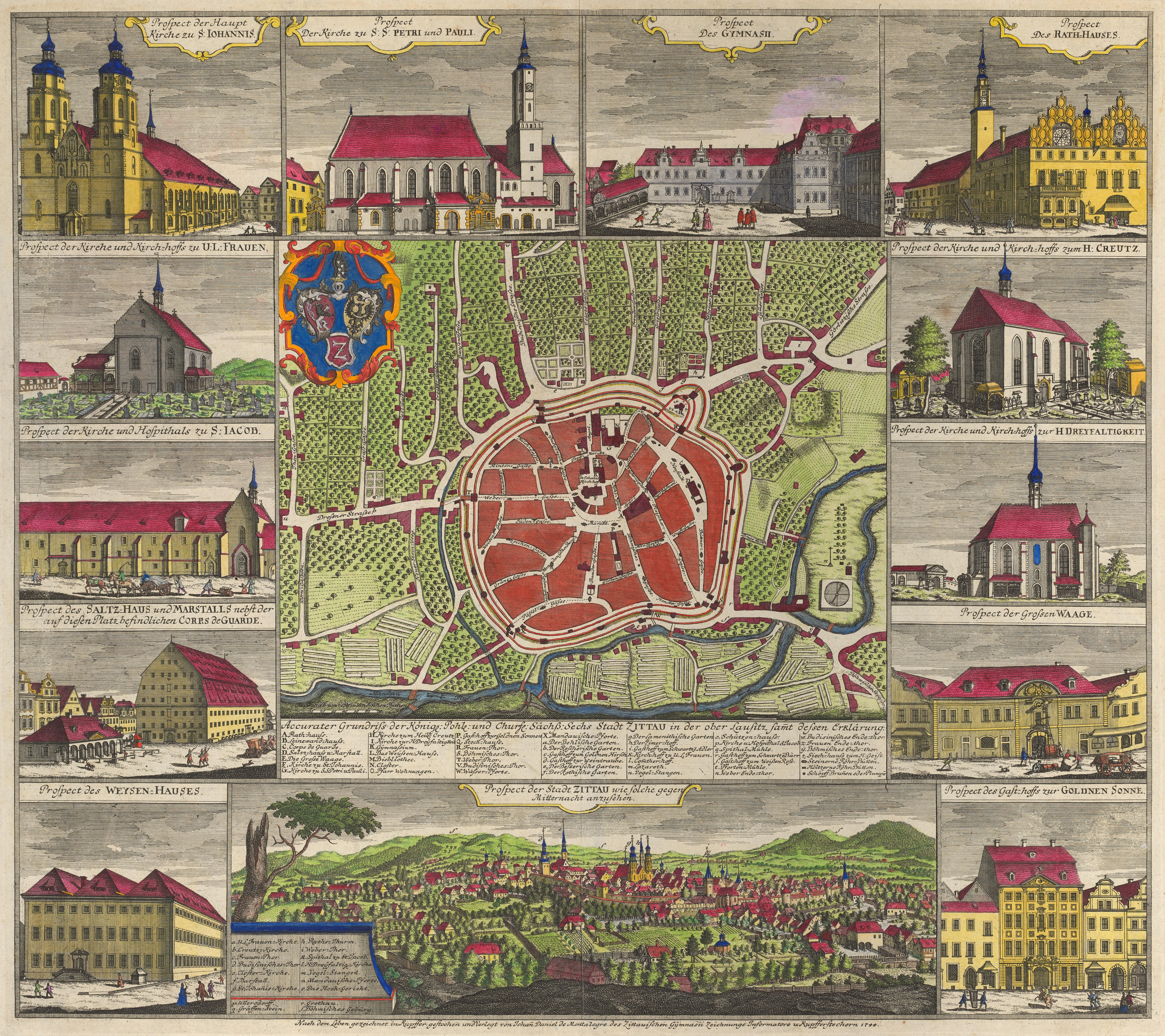
Zittau in 1744, engraved by Johann Daniel de Montalegre

Johann and his older brother Philipp came from a Nuremberg family of rugmakers. Neither are related to Adam Krieger, another Baroque composer. Johann studied with Heinrich Schwemmer (teacher of Johann Pachelbel) at St. Sebaldus, and sang in the choir there for several years. From 1661–68 Krieger studied keyboard playing with Georg Caspar Wecker. His older brother's development was different, for Johann Philipp studied with a Froberger pupil, Johann Drechsel. However, for about a decade from 1668 the two brothers' lives shared the same course. In 1671 both Kriegers studied composition at Zeitz. In 1672 Johann Philipp moved to Bayreuth and became court organist there. He very quickly rose to the rank of Kapellmeister, and was succeeded as court organist by Johann. In 1677 Johann Philipp was employed as court organist at Halle, and Johann soon became chamber musician at Zeitz, a city some 30 miles away. He then attained the position of Kapellmeister at Greiz (a further 30 miles south from Zeitz).

After Count Heinrich I of Greiz died in 1680, Johann worked as Kapellmeister at Eisenberg for a little less than two years. He then moved far to the east, to Zittau, to become director chori musici and organist of the Church of St. John (Johanniskirche) there. He held the post for 53 years, until his death. The Zittau position evidently suited the composer. The church stood in the center of the city and was one of the most important churches of Zittau. It had several organs, providing ample opportunity to experiment. There was no opera house in Zittau, but Krieger's Singspiels were, nevertheless, performed by the pupils of the city's Gymnasium. Soon after getting the Zittau position, Krieger started publishing his music. The first to appear was Neue musicalische Ergetzligkeit, a large collection of arias and songs for one to four voices, published in 1684 in Frankfurt and Leipzig. Keyboard collections, including Sechs musicalische Partien and Anmuthige Clavier-Übung followed more than a decade later, in 1697 and 1698 respectively, both printed in Nuremberg.

Krieger died on 18 July 1735 at the advanced age of 83. According to Johann Mattheson, whose Grundlage einer Ehren-Pforte remains the main source for biographical detail on Krieger, the composer was active until the very end of his life, still performing at a service on 17 July 1735, the day before he died. He outlived his brother by some 10 years: Johann Phillip died in 1725, after spending 45 years of his life in Weißenfels, a city in central Germany, not far from the places the two brothers worked at when they were young. The city of Zittau was destroyed in 1757 during the hostilities of the Seven Years' War, the Church of St. John is no longer standing. Among the numerous lost works are all of Krieger's known Singspiels. His older brother's oeuvre also suffered from events that occurred after his death: of some 2,000 cantatas by Johann Phillip, only 76 survive.

== Works ==
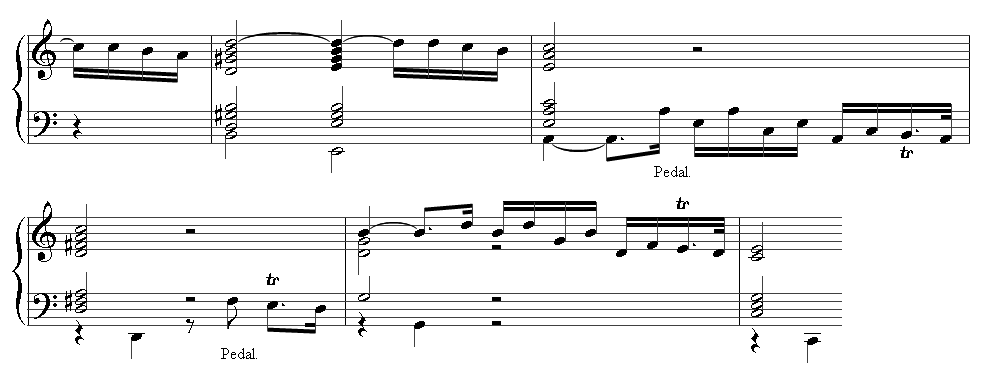
Excerpt from Krieger's Toccata mit dem Pedal aus C, showing a marked North German influence.

Krieger's keyboard works comprise the most important part of his surviving oeuvre. The six suites of Sechs musicalische Partien (Nuremberg, 1697) are worthy additions to Central German repertoire of the time and belong to the same tradition as Pachelbel's and Fischer's suites. They employ the standard dance order of allemande, courante, sarabande, and gigue, with additional movements (minuets, gavottes, etc.) added to fill space (as the composer specifies in the preface). Unusually, some of these additional dances are not in the keys of their corresponding suites. The collection also includes, as the first piece, a Fantasia, which belongs to the type cultivated by Pachelbel. Here, an eight-measure theme returns periodically as a refrain, in a polyphonic texture.

Anmuthige Clavier-Übung (Nuremberg, 1698) was the second collection of keyboard music Krieger published, and it is a much more important work. It comprises 25 pieces: nine preludes, five ricercares, seven fugues, two toccatas, a fantasy, and a chaconne. Ricercares and fugues showcase Krieger's contrapuntal skills which his contemporaries praised. For example, five of the fugues form a sequence in which four subjects are first treated independently (fugues nos. 11–14), and then appear together in a quadruple fugue (fugue no. 15). Almost all of the ricercars employ inversion, either as an inversion fugue, from the very beginning (nos. 2, 8, and 17), or in a separate section (nos. 3 and 7); ricercar no. 7 has a countersubject that is inverted in the course of the piece. Non-imitative pieces in the collection also have a fair share of interesting characteristics. The Chaconne in G minor marks the earliest known instance of an eight-bar ostinato pattern, as opposed to the more traditional four-bar pattern. It contains 29 variations, some of which form pairs, and the first setting of the theme returns and is used as a refrain three times. Toccata mit dem Pedal aus C, the last piece in Anmuthige Clavier-Übung, was described by Willi Apel as "perhaps the only fully-developed toccata written in central Germany before Bach." The toccata starts with a pedal solo, which is followed by a chordal section with recitative breaks, a song-like section in 3/4 time, an interlude, and a fugue whose subject is heard in the pedal twice, requiring alternating feet. Sectional organ works with virtuosic use of pedal were common for north German composers, but no central or south German composers attempted such pieces before Krieger. North German influence is also apparent in the other toccata of the collection, Toccata in D minor. Krieger's preludes are short pieces, free developments of a harmonic or a rhythmic idea, employing fast passagework, short fugatos, etc.

Anmuthige Clavier-Übung was the last work Krieger published during his lifetime. It was admired by Handel, who took a copy with him to England and later presented said copy to his friend, one Bernard Granville. The latter added the following note to it:

The printed book is by one of the celebrated Organ players of Germany; Mr. Handel in his youth formed himself a good deal on his plan, and said that Krieger was one of the best writers of his time for the Organ.

A few pieces not included in the printed collections survive in manuscript copies. These include, most importantly, fugues that apparently form a counterpart to ricercar no. 2 from Anmuthige Clavier-Übung, building on variations of the same subject, and two sets of chorale variations: Herr Christ der einig Gottes Sohn and In dich hab ich gehoffet, Herr. Both contain three sections; the third section of the third set is particularly interesting, as it treats the chorale in 6/8 time and a free rhythm. Other pieces in manuscript include two fantasias, one in the manner of Pachelbel and one with fugal design, a Fuga with two obbligato countersubjects, a passacaglia (16 variations), a Durezza, a Battaglia, and other works.

The non-keyboard part of Krieger's oeuvre comprises vocal works only. Neue musicalische Ergetzligkeit (Frankfurt and Leipzig, 1684) is a large collection of songs for one to four voices. It is divided into three parts. The first contains 30 strophic sacred songs, simple pieces in the Nuremberg tradition. The second contains 34 strophic secular songs, set somewhat more freely and in a more ornamented manner. The third part contains arias from five of Krieger's Singspiels: these pieces are the only surviving fragments of those large stage works. Out of Krieger's 235 known sacred vocal works only 33 survive, mostly cantatas. Distinguishing features of the cantatas include fugal movements with advanced technique, but for the most part the music builds on styles and techniques quite common at the time.

== List of works ==
=== Vocal ===
==== Cantatas ====
All for four voices with instrumental accompaniment, unless specified otherwise.

- Confitebor tibi Domine (1686)
- Danket dem Herrn (1687)
- Danksaget dem Vater (1688)
- Der Herr ist mein Licht, 2vv
- Dies ist der Tag (1687)
- Dominus illuminatio mea, 1v (1690)
- Frohlocket Gott in allen Landen (before 1717)
- Gelobet sey der Herr (1698)
- Gott ist unser Zuversicht
- Halleluja, lobet den Herrn (1685)
- Nun dancket alle Gott (1717)
- Rühmet den Herrn
- Sulamith, auf, auf zum Waffen, 5vv (1717)
- Zion jaucht mit Freuden, 1v

==== Motets ====
- Also hat Gott die Welt geliebet (1717)
- Delectare in Domino (1717)
- Ihr Feinde weichet weg (1717)
- In te Domine speravi, 1v
- Laudate Dominum omnes gentes, 5vv
- Laudate pueri Dominum, 3vv

==== Mass movements ====
- 2 Magnificats, 4vv
- 5 Sanctus movements, 2–4vv

==== Songs and arias ====
- Neue musicalische Ergetzligkeit, das ist Unterschiedene Erfindungen welche Herr Christian Weise, in Zittau von geistlichen Andachten, Politischen Tugend-Liedern und Theatralischen Sachen bishero gesetzet hat (Frankfurt and Leipzig, 1684)
  - Part 1: 30 sacred songs
  - Part 2: 34 secular songs
  - Part 3: arias from Singspiels
- 19 occasional songs, published individually between 1684 and 1697, and at least one other song

==== Stage ====
All of these works are lost, but arias and instrumental parts of several were published in Neue musicalische Ergetzligkeit.

- Jakobs doppelte Heirat (1682)
- Der verfolgte David (1683)
- Die sicilianische Argenis (1683)
- Von der verkehrten Welt (Lustspiel) (1683)
- Nebucadnezar (1684)
- Der schwedische Regner (1684)
- Der politische Quacksalber (1684)
- Die vierte Monarchie (1684)
- Der Amandus-Tag (1688)
- Friedrich der Weise (1717)
- Die vormahlige zittauische Kirchen Reformation (Dramate) (1721)

=== Keyboard ===
- Sechs musicalische Partien (Nuremberg, 1697): a fantasy and six harpsichord suites
- Anmuthige Clavier-Übung (Nuremberg, 1698): 9 preludes, 5 ricercares, 7 fugues, 2 toccatas, 1 fantasy, 1 chaconne
- Miscellaneous individual pieces in manuscripts: chorale partita Herr Christ der einig Gottes Sohn, chorale partita In dich hab ich gehoffet, Herr, other chorale settings, fugues, fantasias, 1 passacaglia, 1 battaglia, 1 durezze, and other works
