= Johann Philipp Krieger =

German Baroque composer and organist

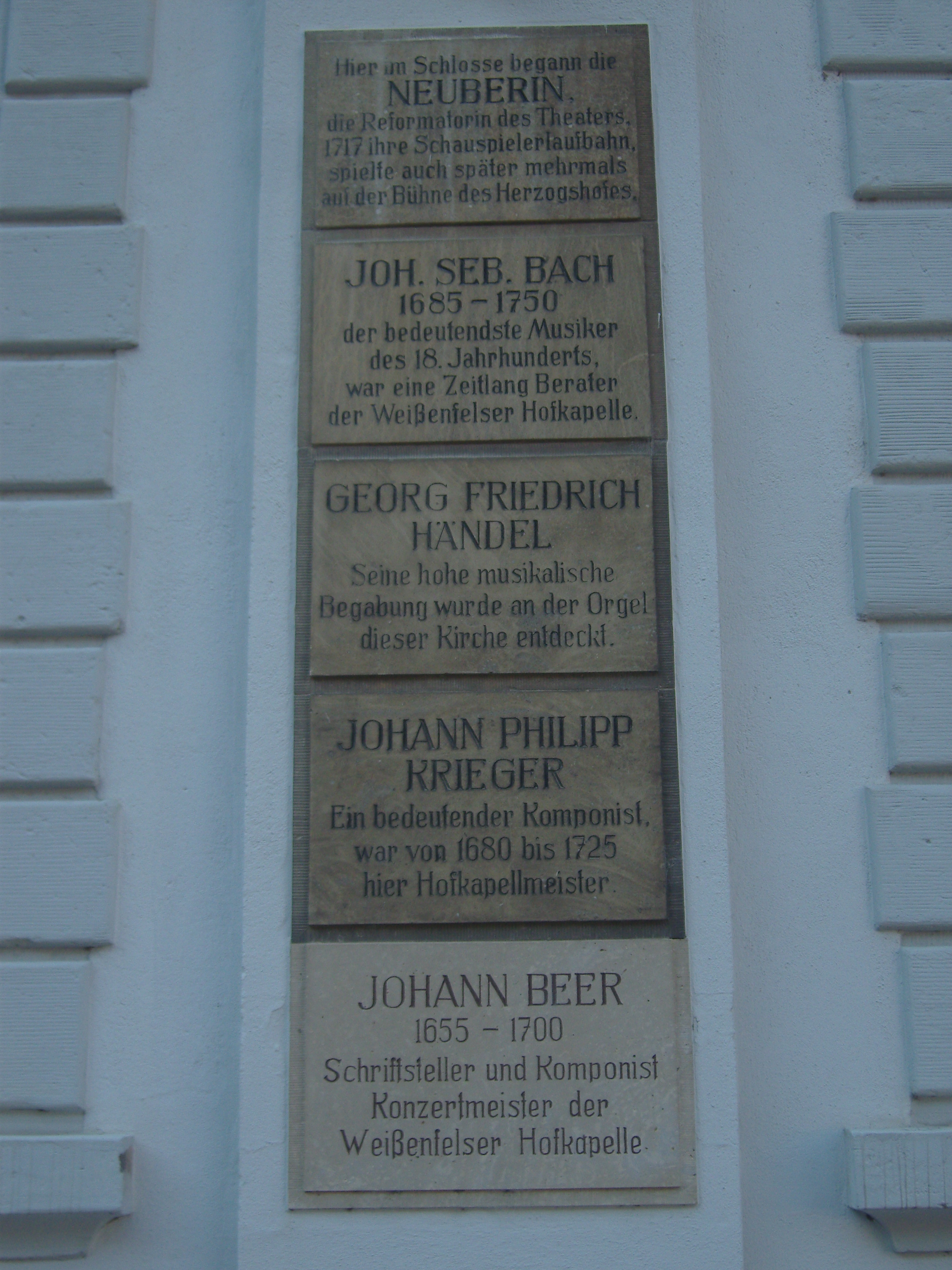

Johann Philipp Krieger (also Kriger, Krüger, Krugl, and Giovanni Filippo Kriegher; baptised 27 February 1649; died 7 February 1725) was a German Baroque composer and organist. He was the elder brother of Johann Krieger.

== Life ==
=== Early years ===
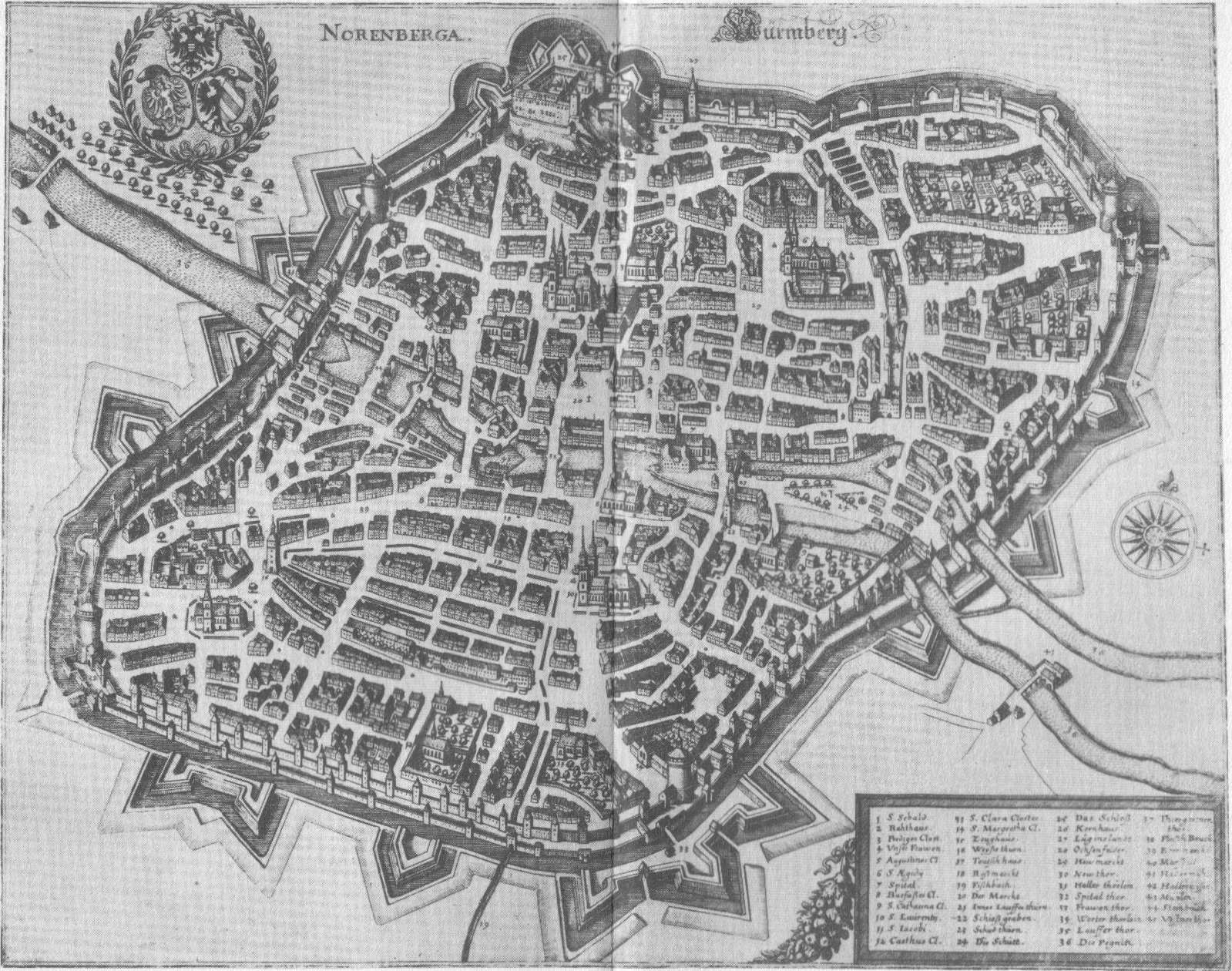
A 1650 engraving of Nuremberg, home of the Krieger family.

The Krieger brothers came from a Nuremberg family of rugmakers. According to Johann Mattheson's Grundlage einer Ehren-Pforte, Johann Philipp started studying keyboard playing at age 8, with Johann Drechsel (a pupil of the celebrated Johann Jakob Froberger) and other instruments at around the same time, with Gabriel Schütz. He was apparently a gifted student, displaying absolute pitch and a feeling for keyboard music: according to Mattheson, already after a year of studies he was able to impress large audiences and was composing attractive arias. Johann Philipp soon left Nuremberg for Copenhagen, where he spent some four or five years, studying organ playing with Johann Schröder, the royal organist, and composition with Kaspar Förster. The precise dates of his stay in Copenhagen are unknown: Mattheson reports 1665 to 1670, but Johann Gabriel Doppelmayr, author of a 1730 biographical volume on famous residents of Nuremberg, claimed Johann Philipp stayed in Copenhagen between 1663 and 1667. During his stay, whenever it occurred, Johann Philipp was offered an invitation to become organist in Christiania (now Oslo, Norway), which he declined.

Mattheson and Doppelmayr also differ on the details of Johann Philipp's subsequent career. He and his brother evidently spent some time in Zeitz, studying composition, and also went to Bayreuth, where Johann Philipp became court organist, and then rose to the rank of Kapellmeister, Johann succeeding him as court organist. However, the precise dates are again unknown. Doppelmayr gives 1669–1670 for the Bayreuth stay, while Mattheson confusingly reports that Johann Philipp was at Zeitz in 1670–1671, and at Bayreuth in 1670–1672. Research has shown that the civic records of Zeitz contain no mention of either brother, and Bayreuth records list Johann Philipp as court organist in 1673, complicating the matter further.

=== Journey to Italy and later life ===
Johann Adolf I, Duke of Saxe-Weissenfels, under whom Krieger was promoted to Kapellmeister, and with whom the composer moved to Weißenfels.

Johann Philipp was still employed in Bayreuth in 1673, when Margrave Christian Ernst left to fight in the Franco-Dutch War. Following that, the composer was granted permission to travel to Italy without loss of salary. He stayed in Venice, studying with Johann Rosenmüller (composition) and Giovanni Battista Volpe (keyboard), and then in Rome, where his teachers were Antonio Maria Abbatini (composition) and Bernardo Pasquini (keyboard and composition). In 1675 Johann Philipp went to Vienna, then one of the most important musical capitals of Europe, where he played for Emperor Leopold I. The Emperor was a well-known patron of the arts and a composer; upon hearing Krieger's performance, he was sufficiently impressed to ennoble him and all his brothers and sisters.

Johann Philipp later returned to Bayreuth, and shortly thereafter travelled to Frankfurt and Kassel. He was offered job invitations in both cities, but either declined both, or held them for a very short time. On 2 November 1677 Johann Philipp was employed as court organist at Halle. Duke August died in 1680 and was succeeded by his brother, Johann Adolf I, who moved the court to Weißenfels. Johann Philipp went with him as Kapellmeister, and this was his last position: he held it for 45 years, until his death. The court's musical establishment soon became one of Germany's greatest. Two years after Johann Philipp moved to Weißenfels, his brother Johann moved to Zittau, similarly to accept a position he would occupy for several decades until his death.

Johann Philipp was a prolific composer and supplied the Weißenfels court with countless sacred and secular works, including some 2,000 cantatas, at least 18 operas, trio-sonatas, etc. He also had numerous works by other composers performed at the court, and kept a catalogue of every piece he performed. He actively published his own music: a set of trio sonatas appeared in 1688, to be followed by another, then a collection of music for wind instruments, etc. Unfortunately, numerous works were lost: for instance, of the 2,000 cantatas only 76 are extant. This is the case with his brother's music, too: hundreds of his compositions are listed in Johann Philipp's catalogue, but very few survive. Johann Philipp died in 1725. He was succeeded as Weißenfels Kapellmeister by his son, Johann Gotthilf, until 1736.

== Compositions ==
Collections of Krieger's music published during the composer's lifetime, in chronological order.

- 12 suonate (Nuremberg, 1688): trio sonatas for two violins and basso continuo
- Auserlesene in denen dreyen Sing-Spielen Flora, Cecrops und Procris enthaltene Arien (Nuremberg, 1690): first volume of arias
- Auserlesene Arien anderer Theil (Nuremberg, 1692): second volume of arias
- 12 suonate (Nuremberg, 1693): trio sonatas for violin, bass viol, and basso continuo
- Musicalischer Seelen-Friede (Nuremberg, 1697): 20 cantatas for a soloist and 1–2 violins (obbligato/ad lib)
- Lustige Feld-Music (Nuremberg, 1704): works for 4 wind instruments

In the 21st century Krieger was suggested as one of three possible composers of the Kyrie–Gloria Mass for double choir, BWV Anh. 167.

== Sources ==
- Samuel, Harold E. (2001). "Johann Philipp Krieger". In Sadie, Stanley; Tyrrell, John (eds.). The New Grove Dictionary of Music and Musicians (2nd ed.). London: Macmillan. ISBN 978-1-56159-239-5.
- Wollny, Peter (2015). "Vom „apparat der auserleßensten kirchen Stücke" zum „Vorrath an Musicalien, von J. S. Bach und andern berühmten Musicis": Quellenkundliche Ermittlungen zur frühen Thüringer Bach-Überlieferung und zu einigen Weimarer Schülern und Kollegen Bachs". Bach-Jahrbuch 2015 [Bach Yearbook 2015]. Bach-Jahrbuch (in German). Vol. 101. Neue Bachgesellschaft. Leipzig: Evangelische Verlagsanstalt. ISBN 978-3-374-04320-0. ISSN 0084-7682.
