= Guy Du Faur, Seigneur de Pibrac =

French jurist and poet (1529–1584)

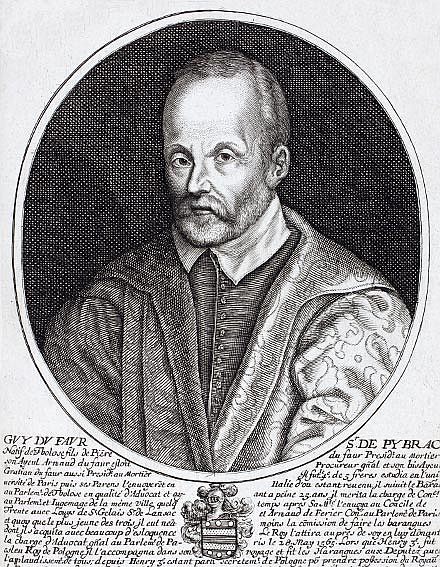
Guy Du Faur, seigneur de Pibrac

Guy Du Faur, Seigneur de Pibrac (1529–1584) was a French jurist and poet.

== Life ==
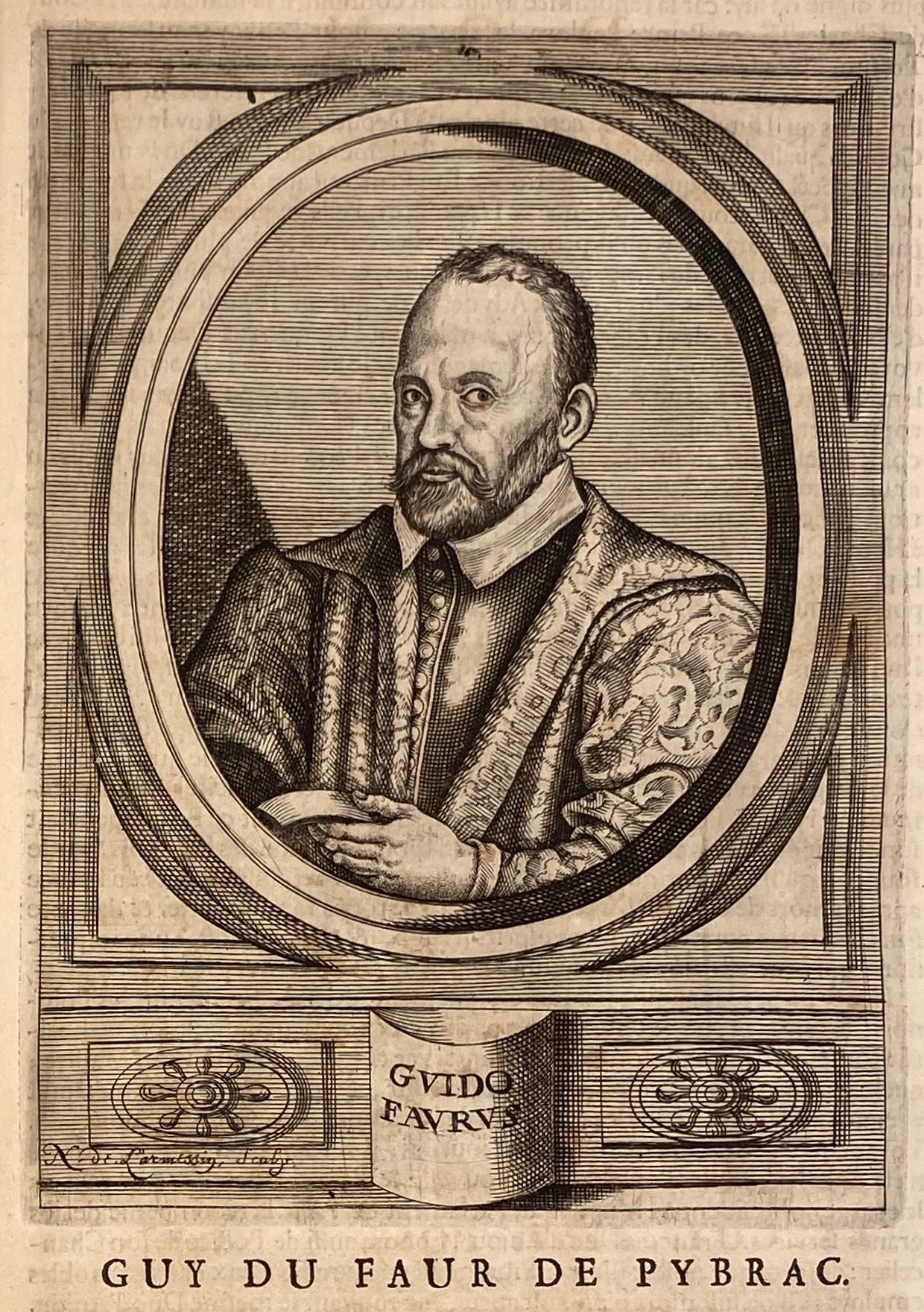
Guy Du Faur de Pibrac

Guy Du Faur, Seigneur de Pibrac was born at Toulouse to an old family of the magistracy. He studied law there with Jacques Cujas, and afterwards at Padua.

In 1548 Pibrac was admitted to the bar at Toulouse, at once took high rank, and in 1557 rose to be juge-mage, an office in Languedocian cities about equal to that of privat. He was selected in 1562 as one of the three representatives of the king of France at the Council of Trent. There he gave a speech arguing for gallicanism.

In 1565 Pibrac became general advocate to the Parlement of Paris, and extended the renaissance in jurisprudence which was transforming French justice. In 1573 he was sent by Charles IX of France to accompany as chancellor his brother Henry (afterwards Henry III) to Poland, of which country Henry had been elected king. Pibrac's fluent Latin won much applause from the Poles, but his second visit to Poland in 1575, when sent back by Henry III to try to save the Crown he had deserted, was not so successful. Then he was employed in negotiations with the so-called politiques, and he managed to keep them quiet for a while. In 1578 he became the chancellor of Marguerite of France, queen of Navarre. Although he was fifty, her beauty and intellectual gifts led him to aspire to win her affection; but he was rejected with disdain.

== Works ==
Pibrac is best remembered today for his poetry. He authored 126 quatrains which were published between 1574 and 1576. These were re-published many times and in many languages during the 17th century, and were set to music by multiple composers. These included settings by composers Orlando di Lasso, Pietro Giuseppe Gaetano Boni, Paschal de L'Estocart, Jean Planson, and Jean de Bournonville.

Pibrac's oratorical style was rather pedantic, but quotations from the classics had a fresher meaning in his day. He was the friend of Ronsard, de Thou and l'Hôpital, and left, among other literary remains, elegant and sententious quatraines.

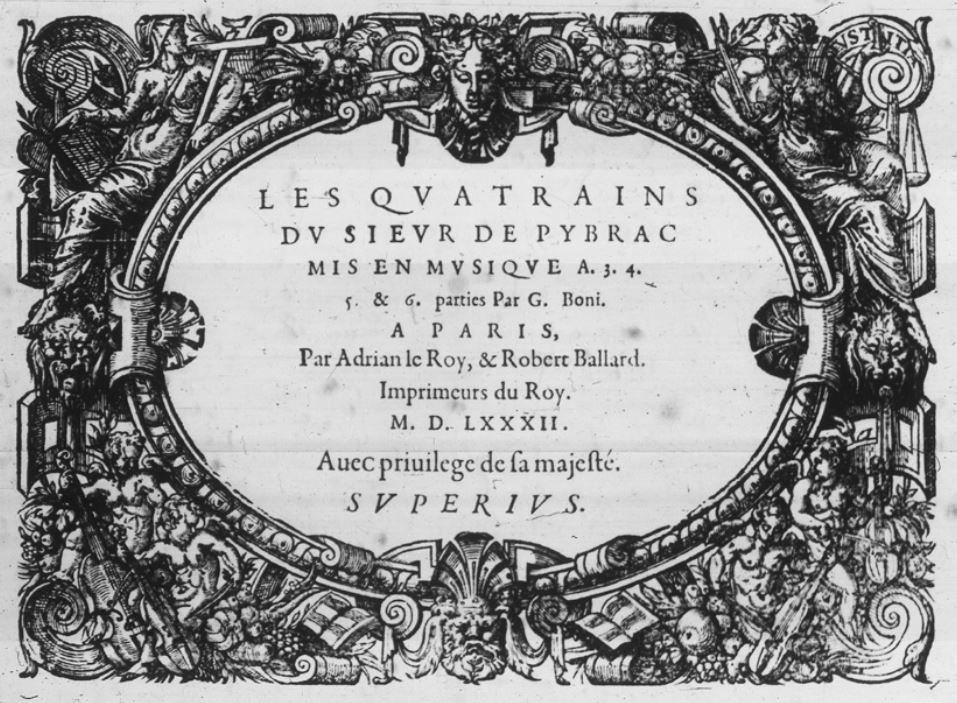
Title page of Quatrains by Pibrac set to music by Guillaume Boni (Paris : Le Roy et Ballard, 1582).

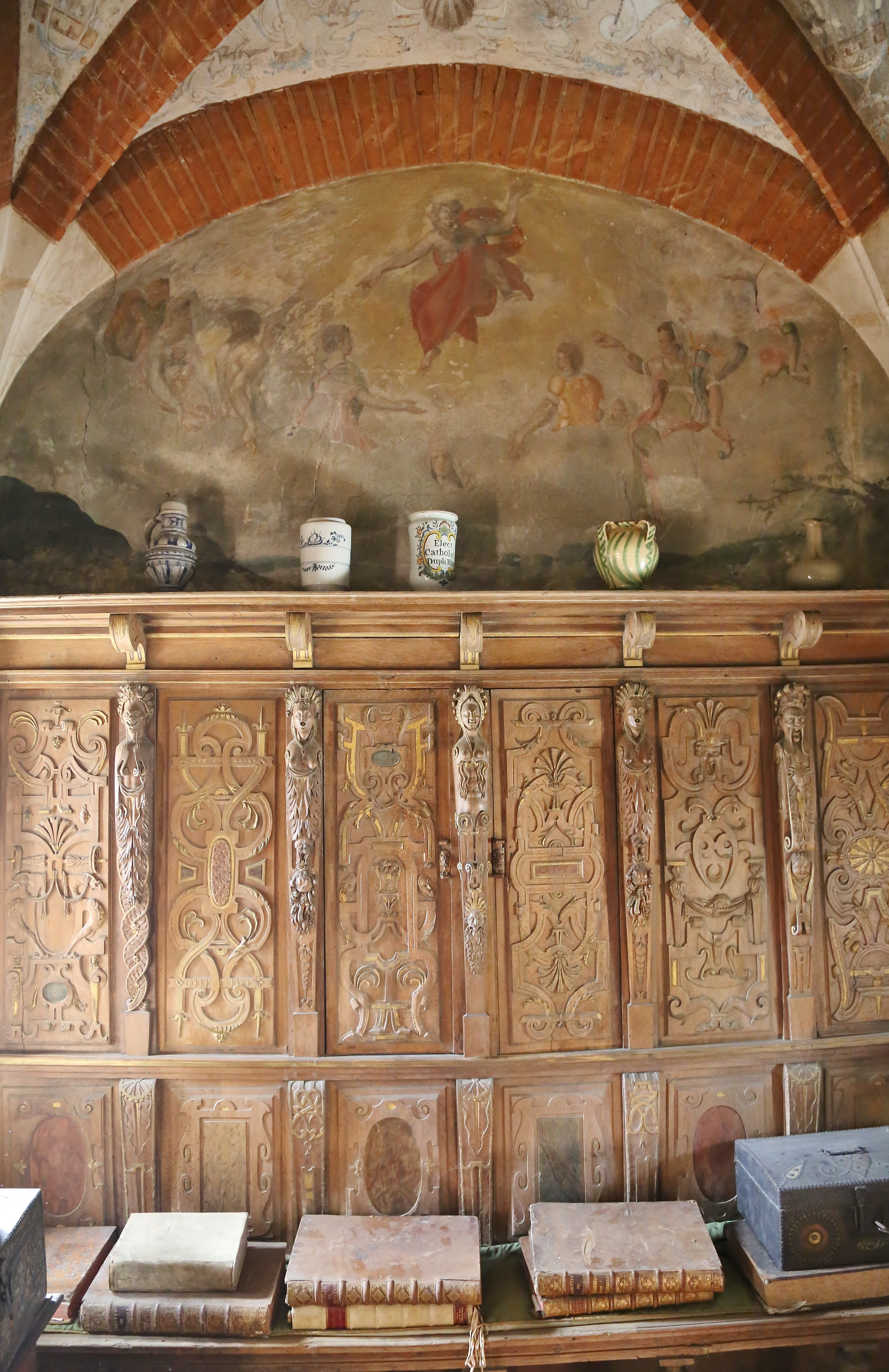
The Quatrains' cabinet (French: Cabinet des Quatrains) at the Château de Pibrac, where tradition has it that he composed his works.

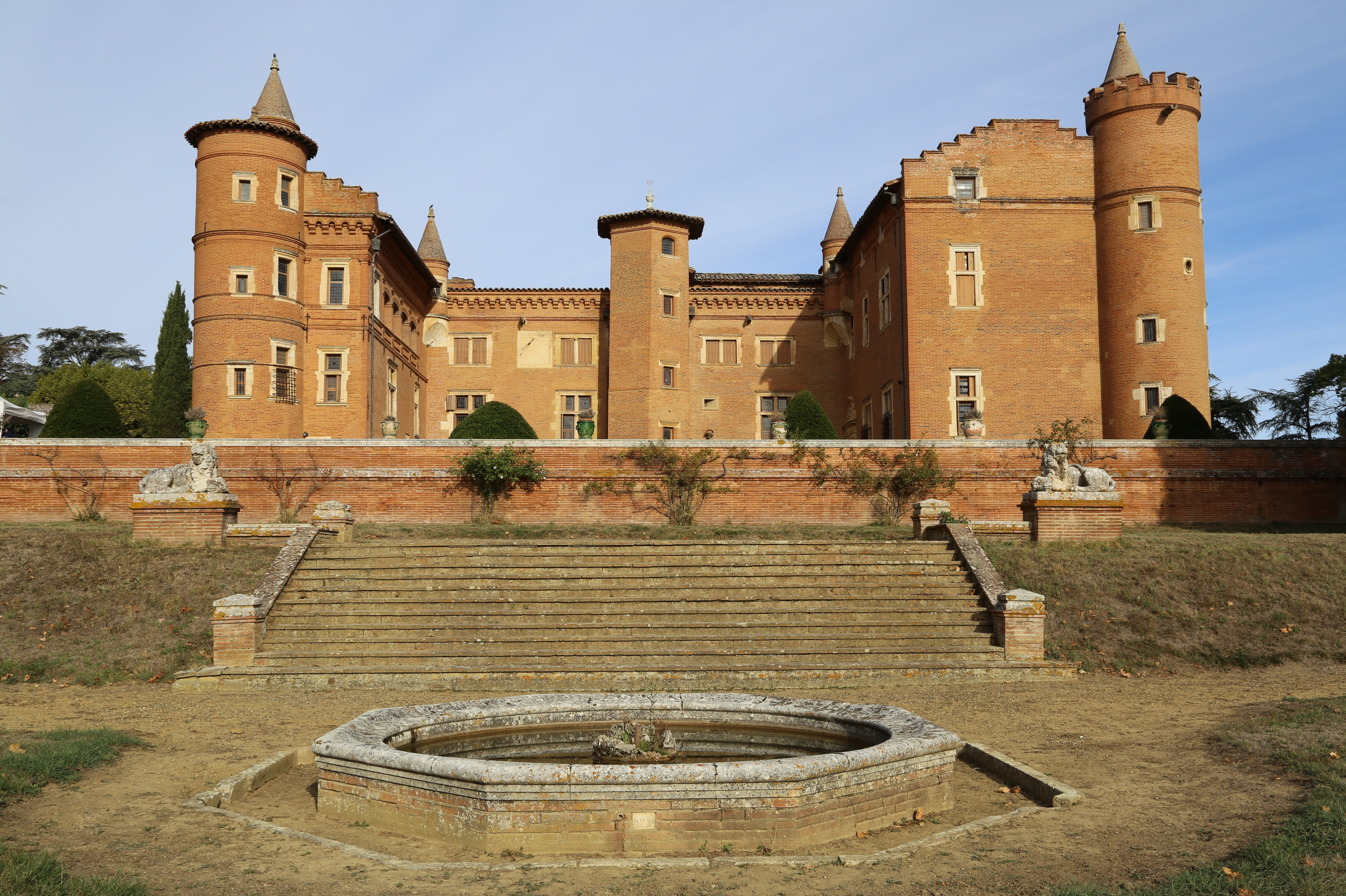
The castle of Pibrac (Haute-Garonne, France).
