= Château de Pibrac =

Converted 16th-century castle in Haute-Garonne, France

Coordinates: 43°37′9″N 1°17′13″E

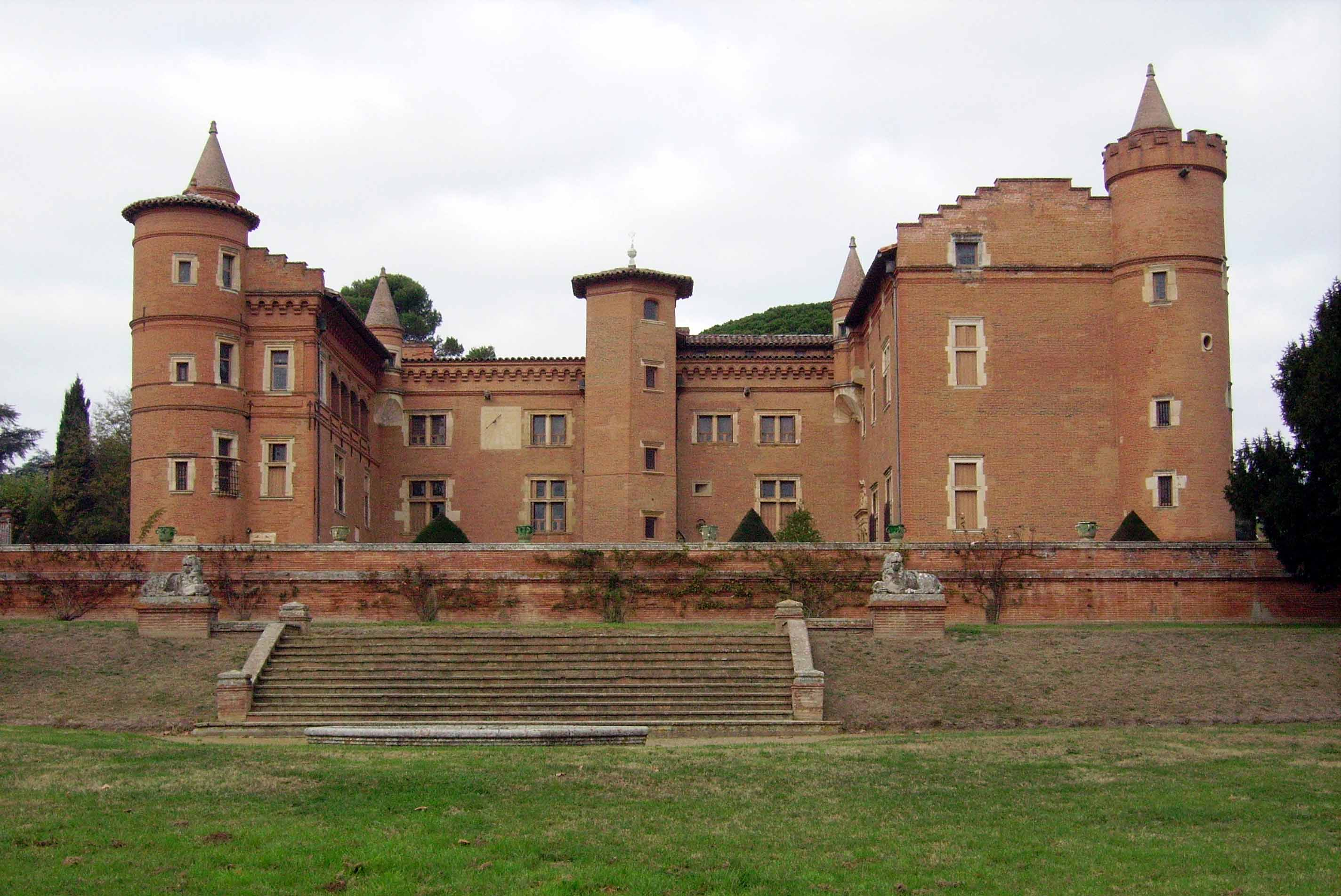
Château de Pibrac

The Château de Pibrac is a converted 16th century castle in the commune of Pibrac in the Haute-Garonne département of France.

It was rebuilt in 1540 to replace the old manor house. The architect appears to be Nicolas Bachelier. During the Revolution, in 1794, the sculptures were smashed and the tops of the towers destroyed. It was restored, with alterations, in 1887.

One of the rooms, known as the Quatrains' cabinet (French: cabinet des Quatrains), has vaults decorated with mythological subjects dating from the 16th century. According to tradition, it was in this room, which has kept its 16th century decorations almost intact, that Guy du Faur de Pibrac composed his famous "moral quatrains".

The red brick structure, privately owned, has been listed since 1932 as a monument historique by the French Ministry of Culture.

Outdoor and park

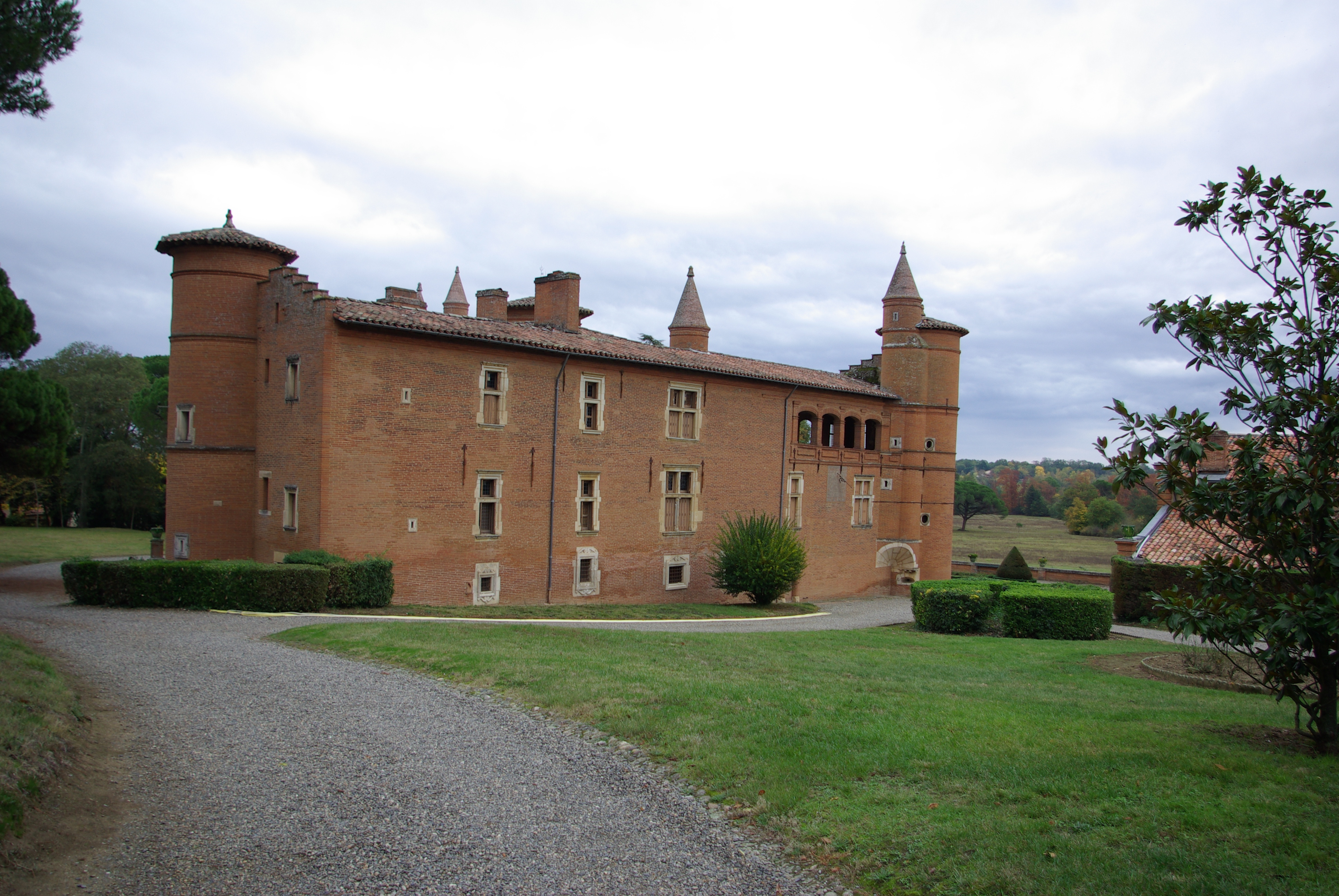
Château de Pibrac

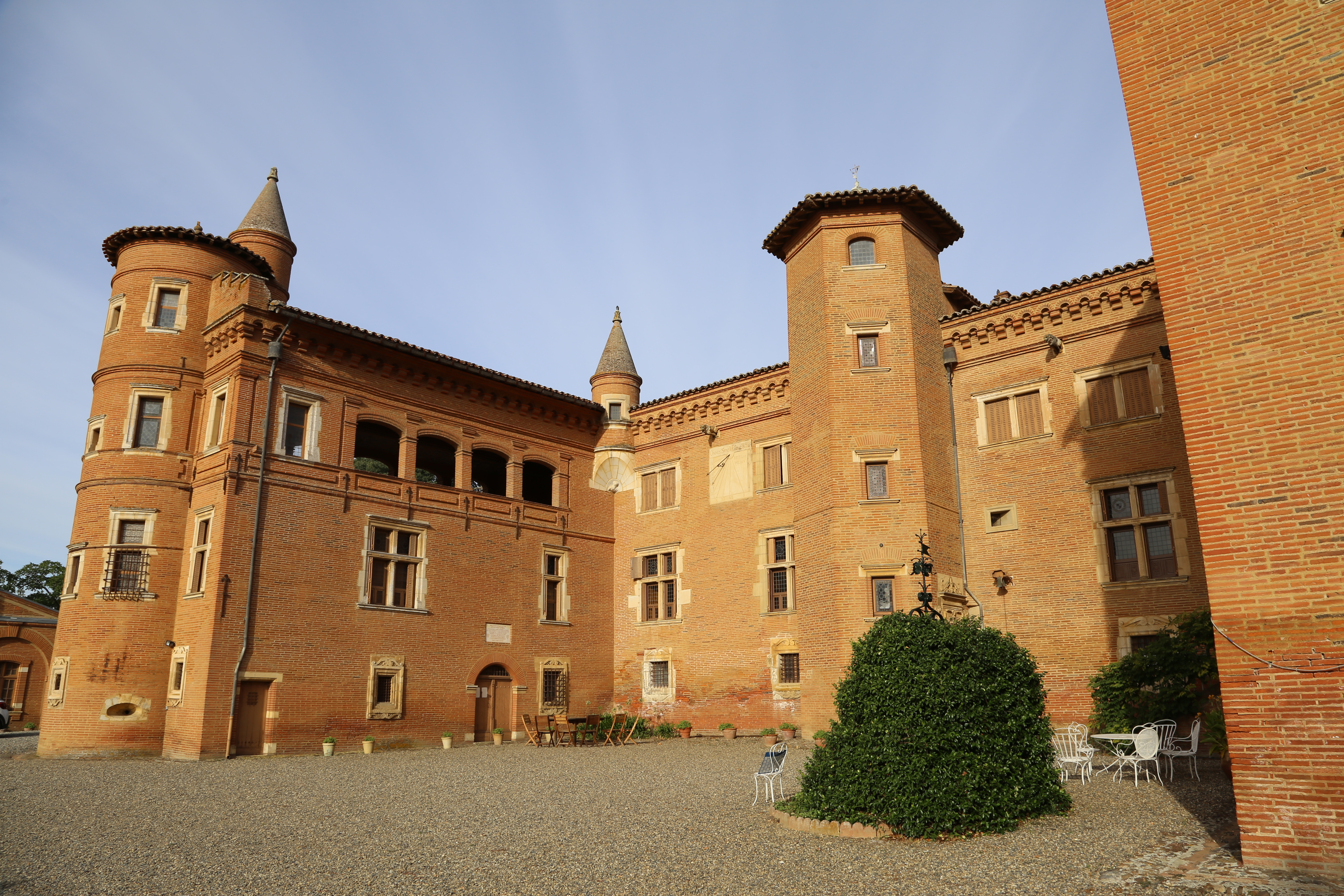
The château

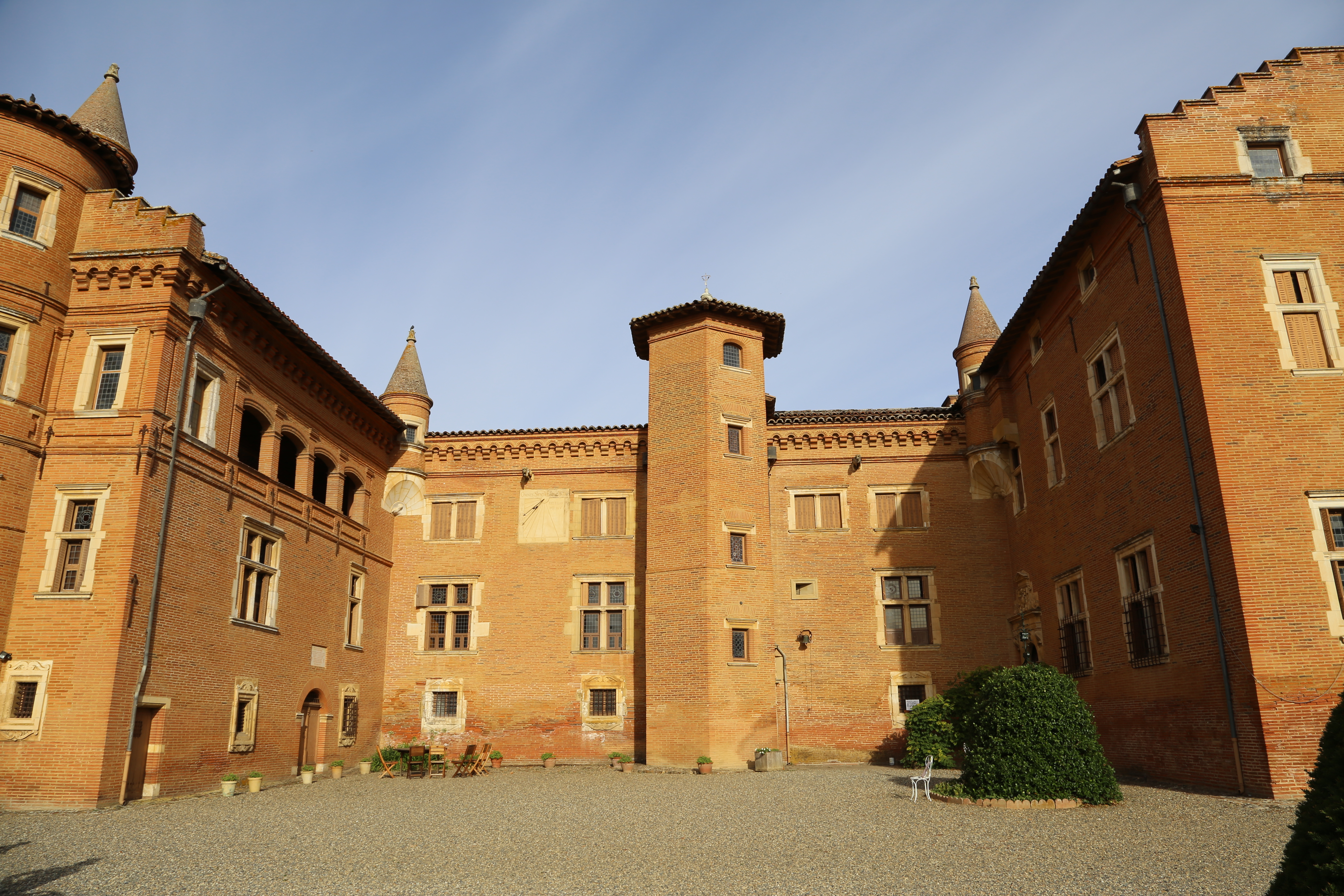
The château

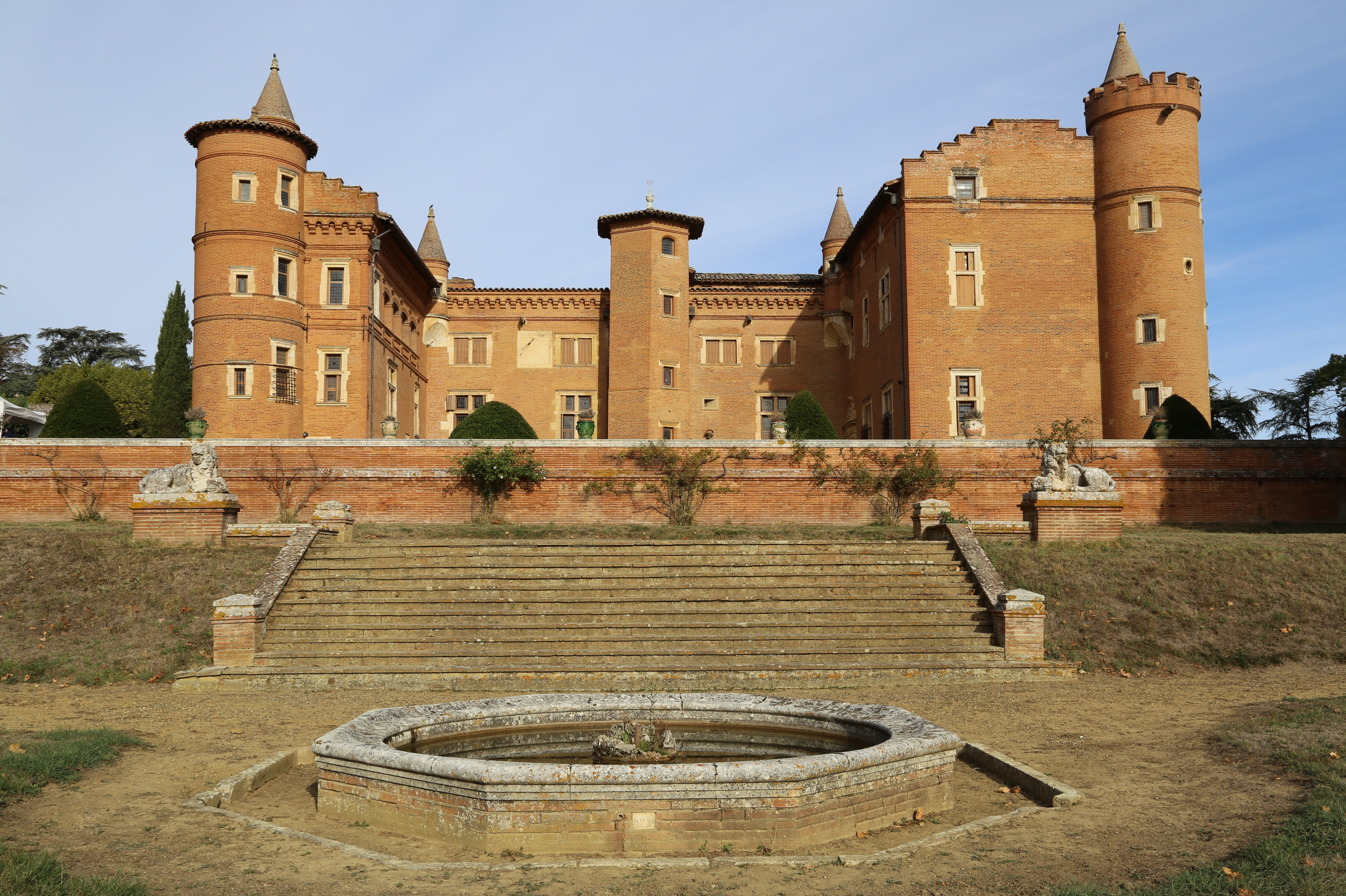
The château

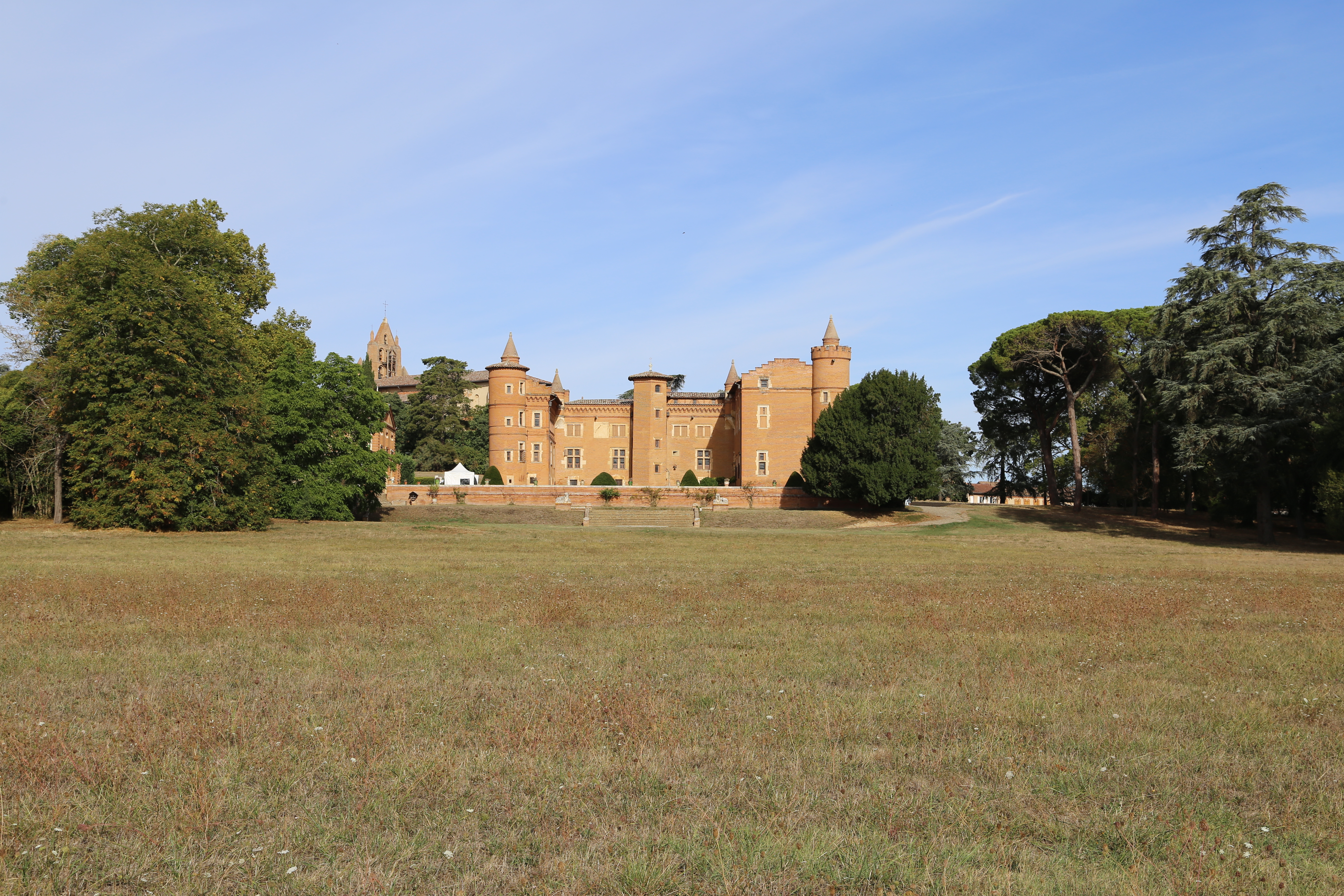
The château

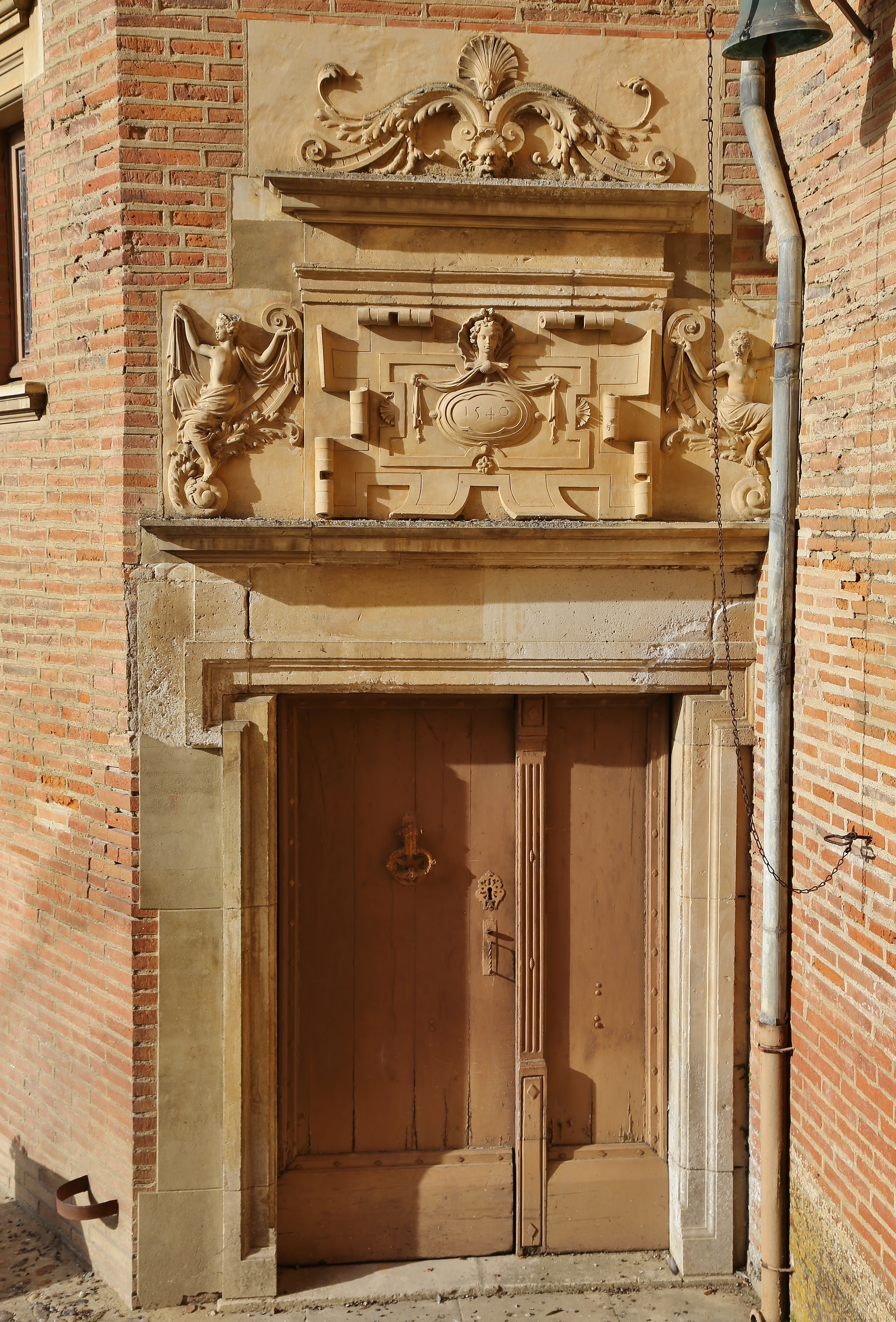
Renaissance door of the tower (restored)

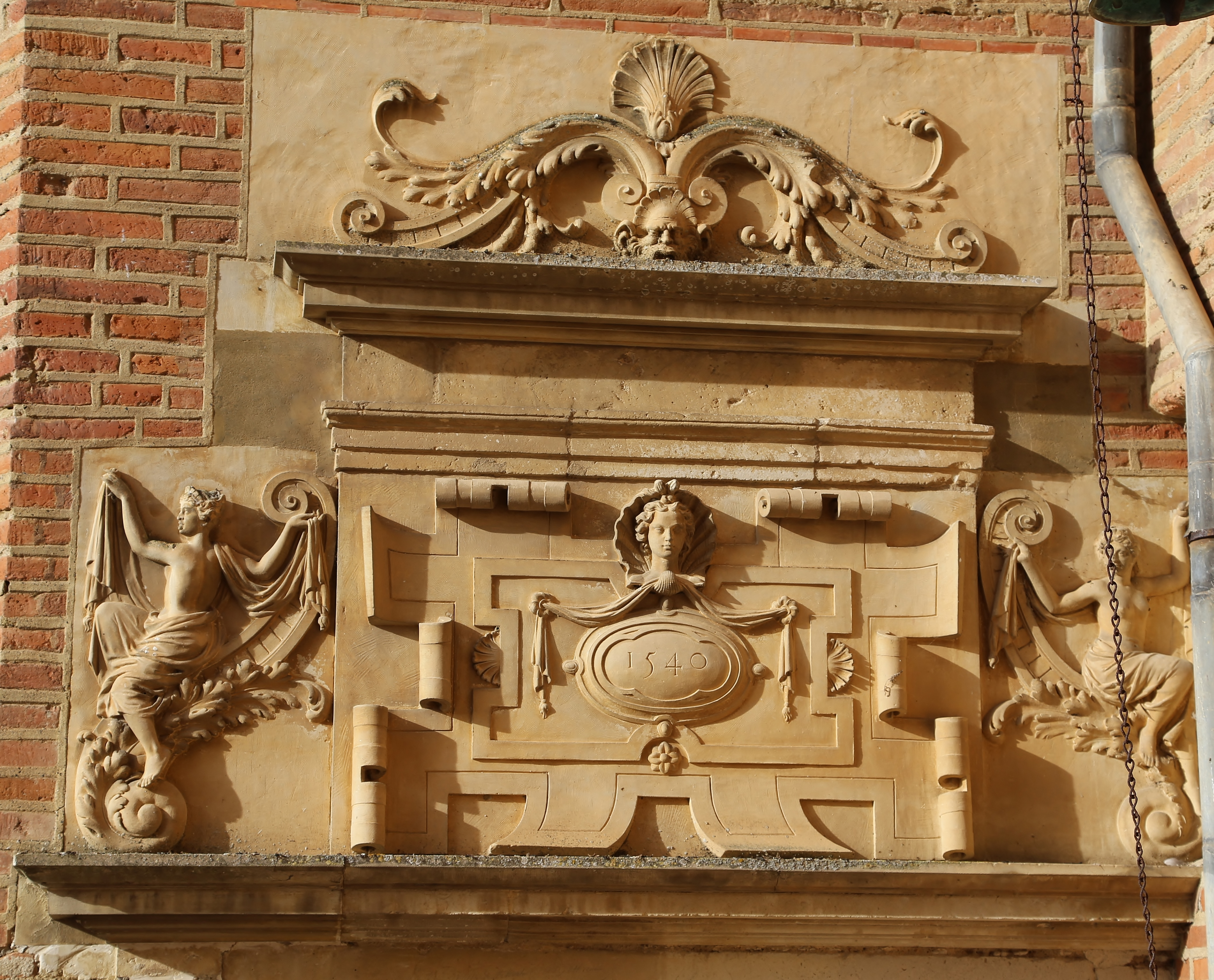
Restored decoration of the Renaissance door of the tower

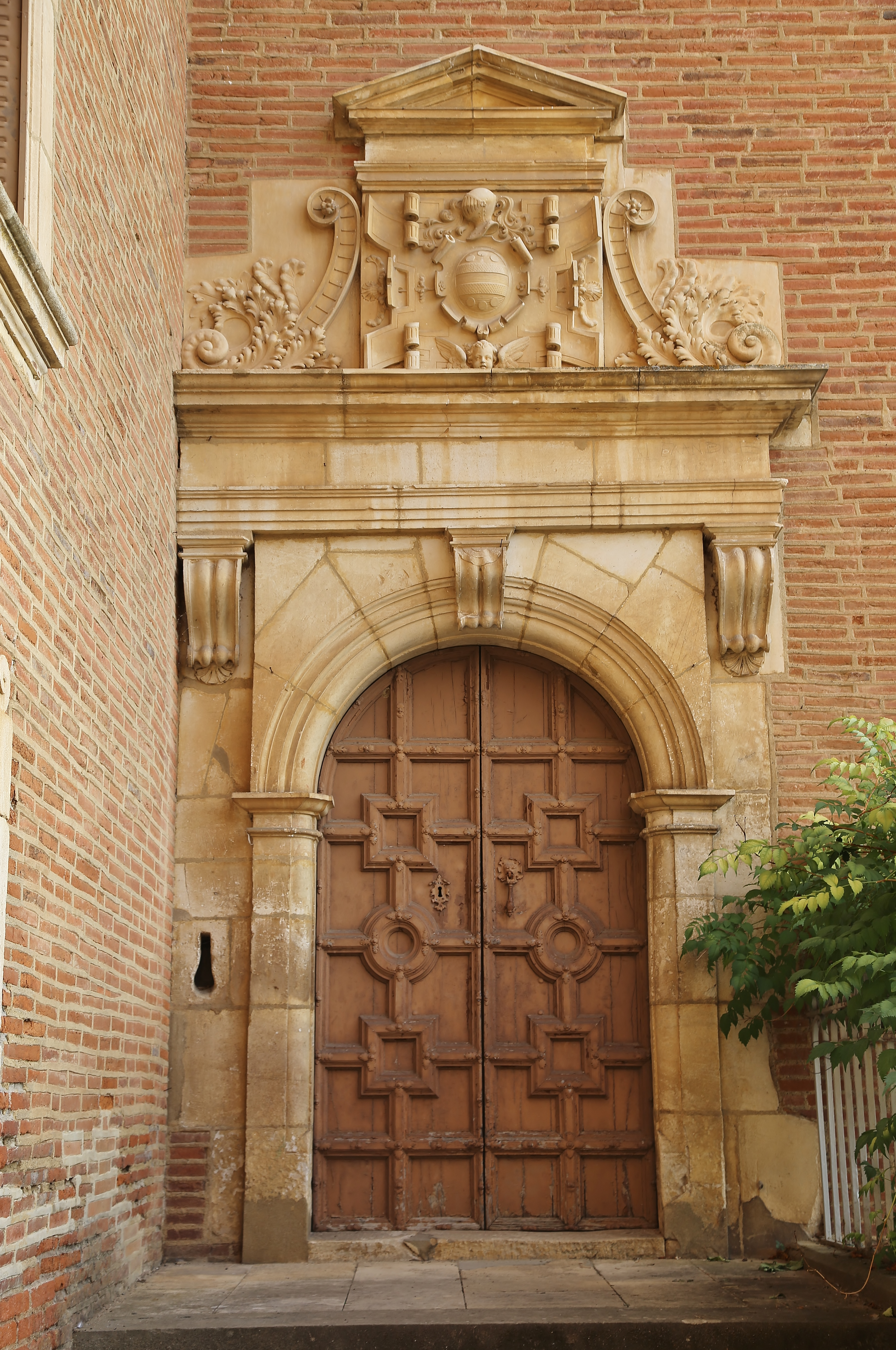
Renaissance door of the château (restored)

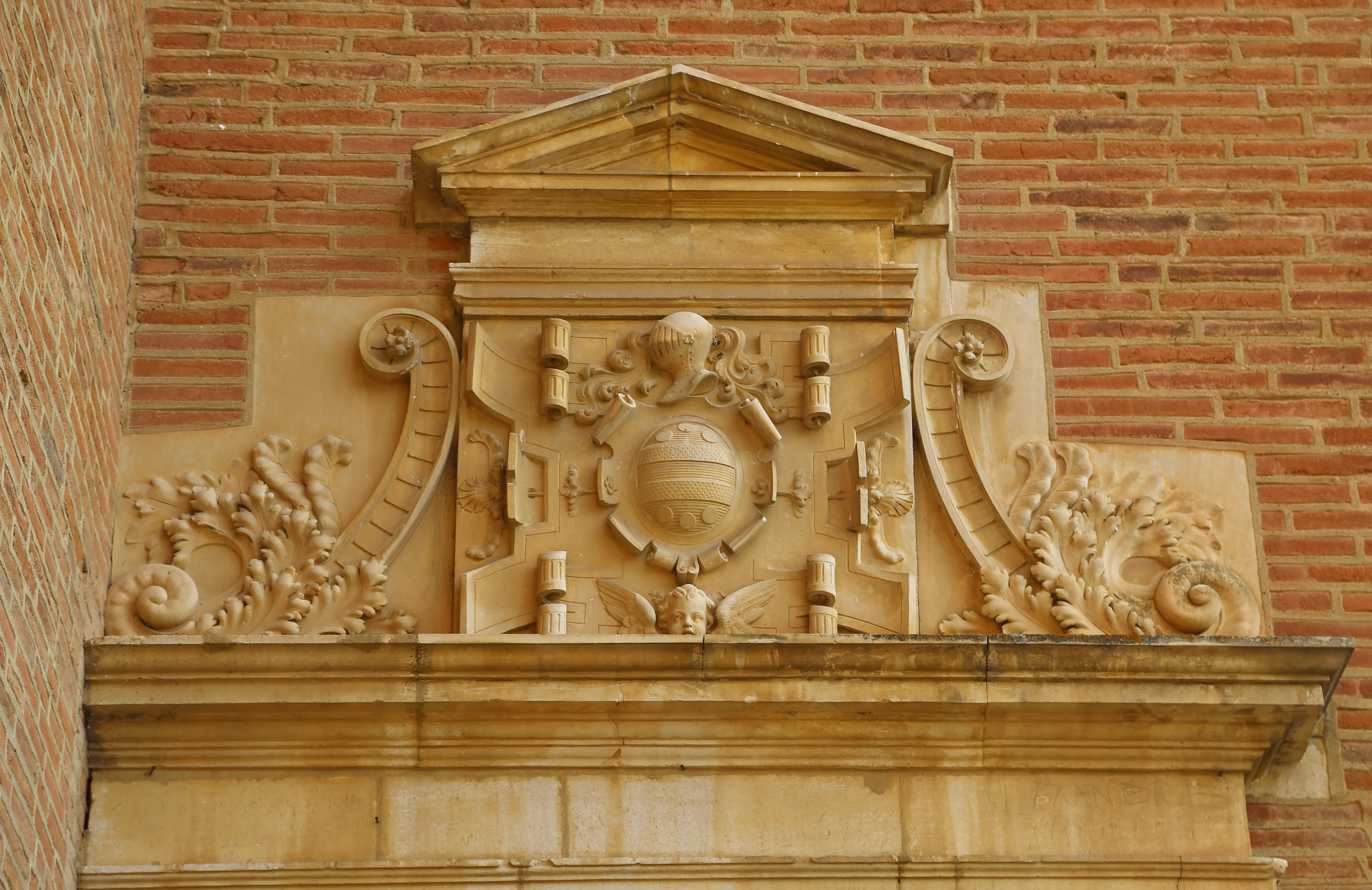
Restored decoration of the Renaissance door of the château

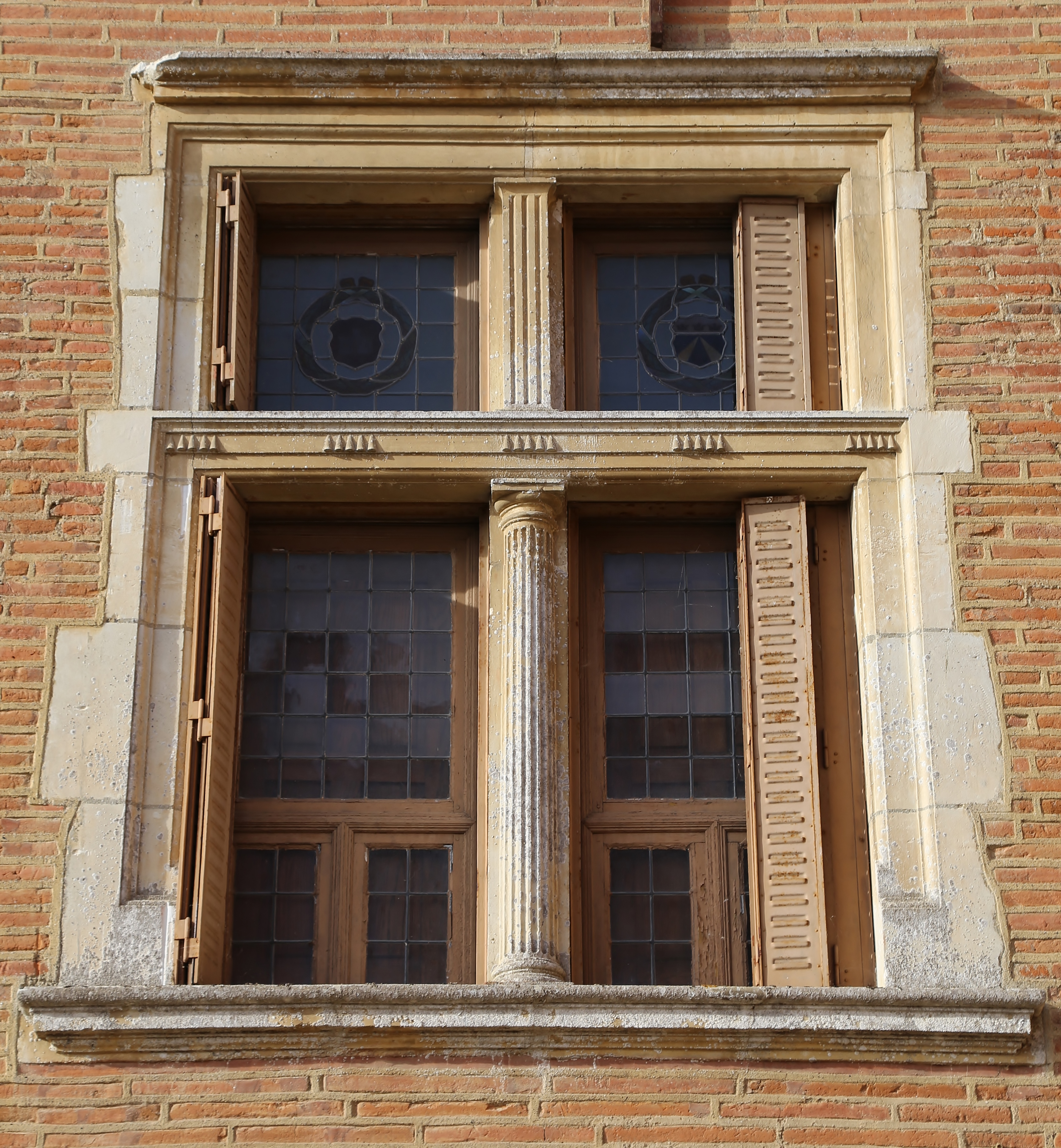
Renaissance window on the first floor

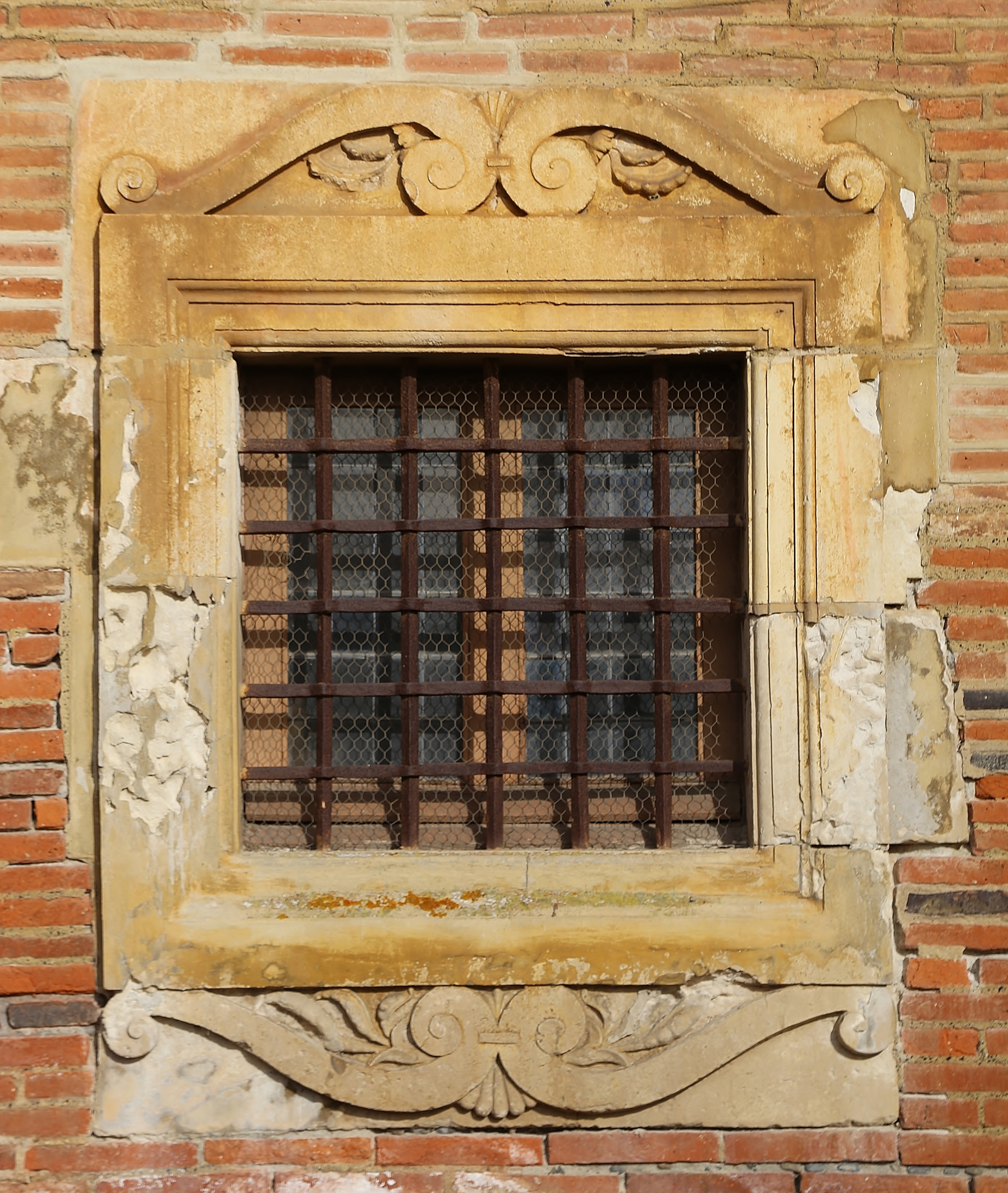
Renaissance window on the ground floor

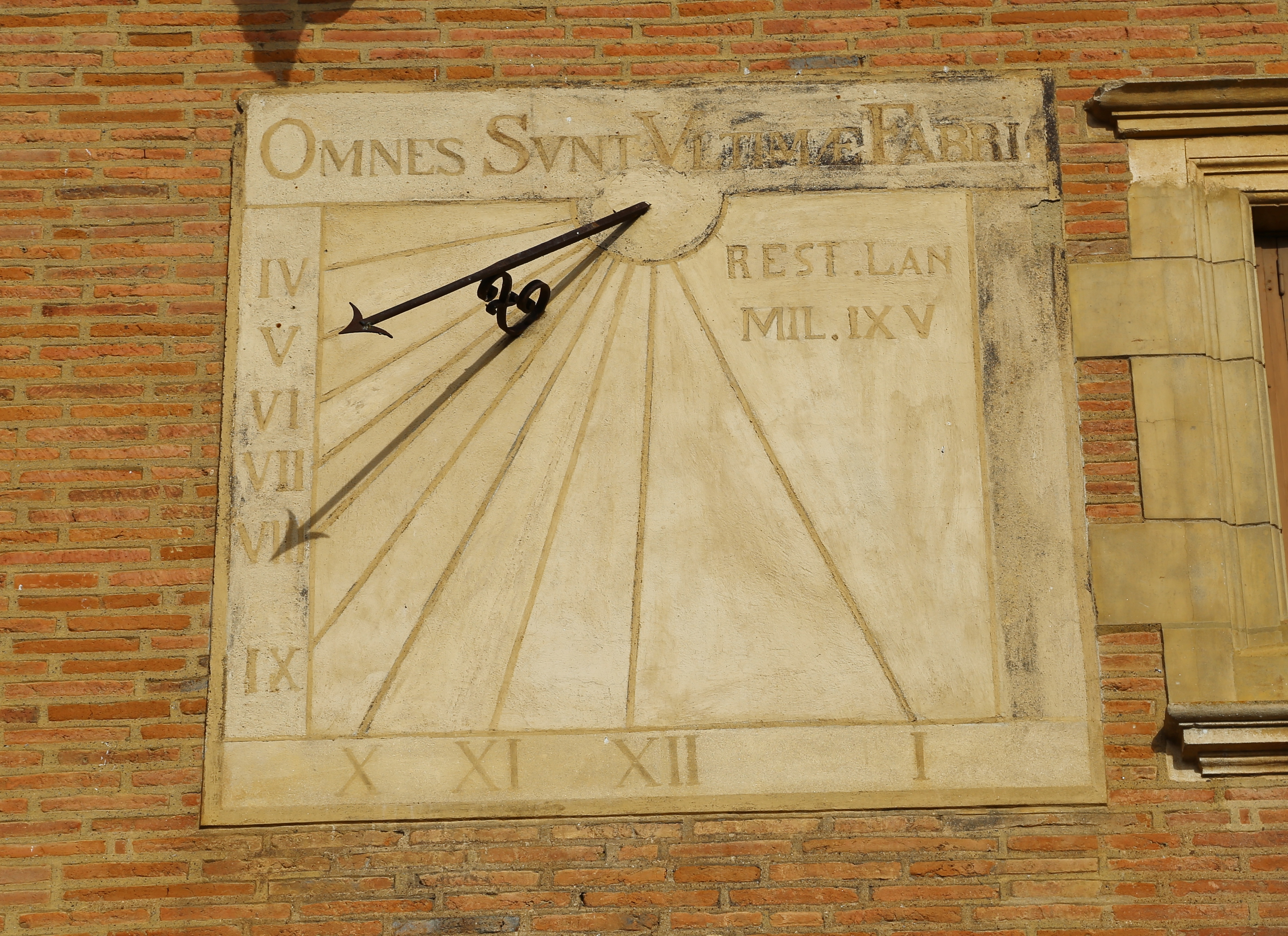
Sundial

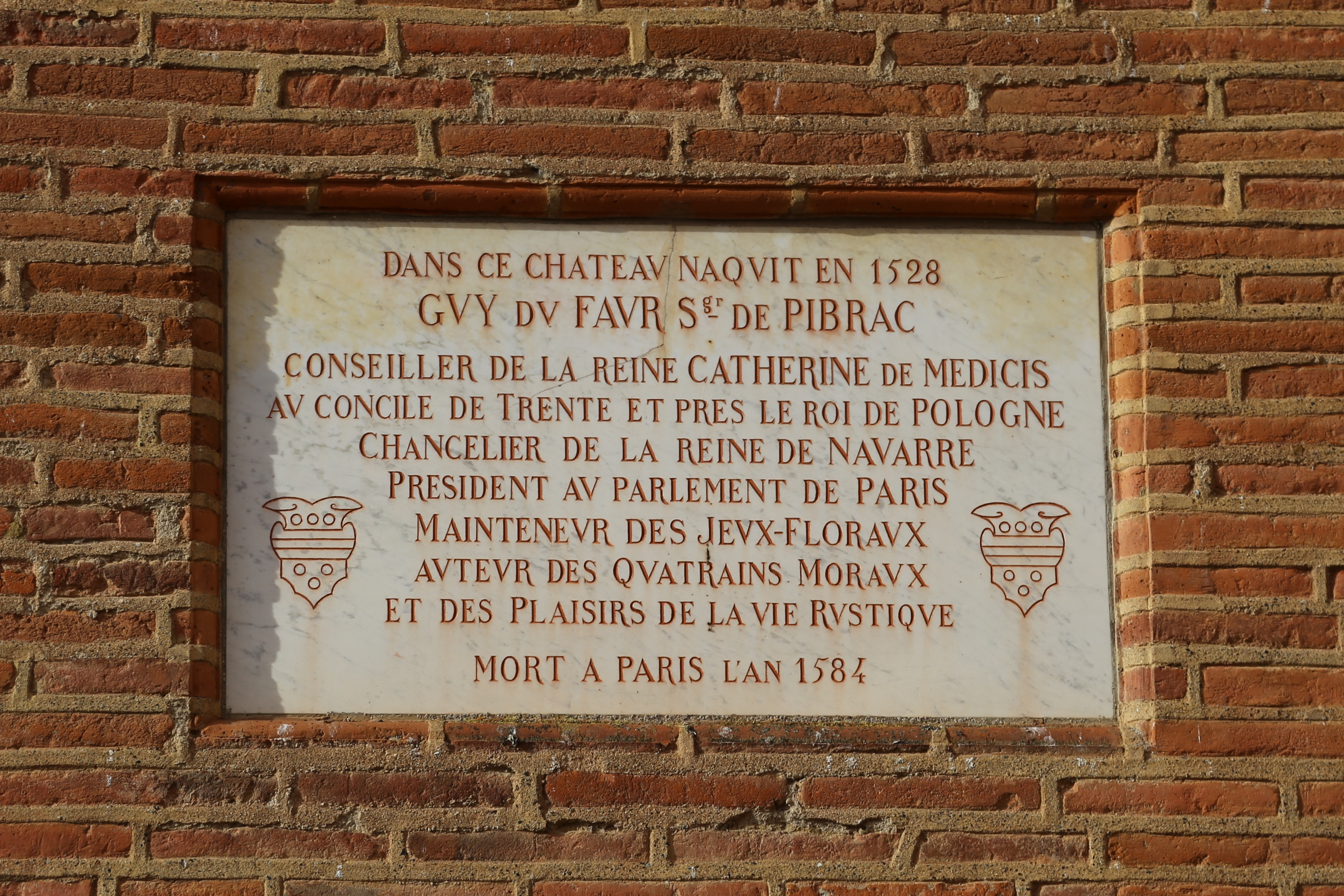
Plaque in memory of Guy du Faur de Pibrac, famous poet and parliamentarian of the 16th century

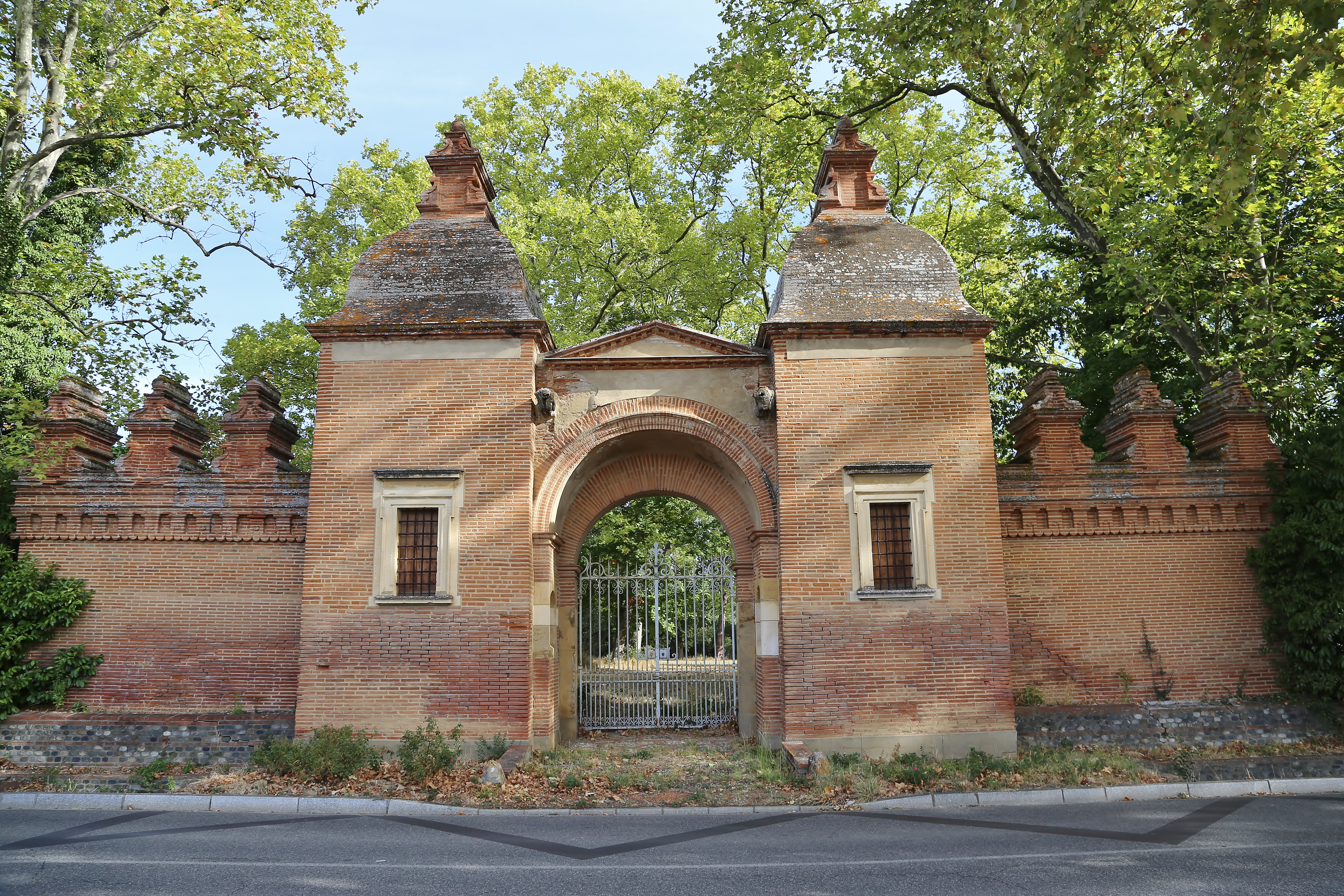
The Henry IV portal

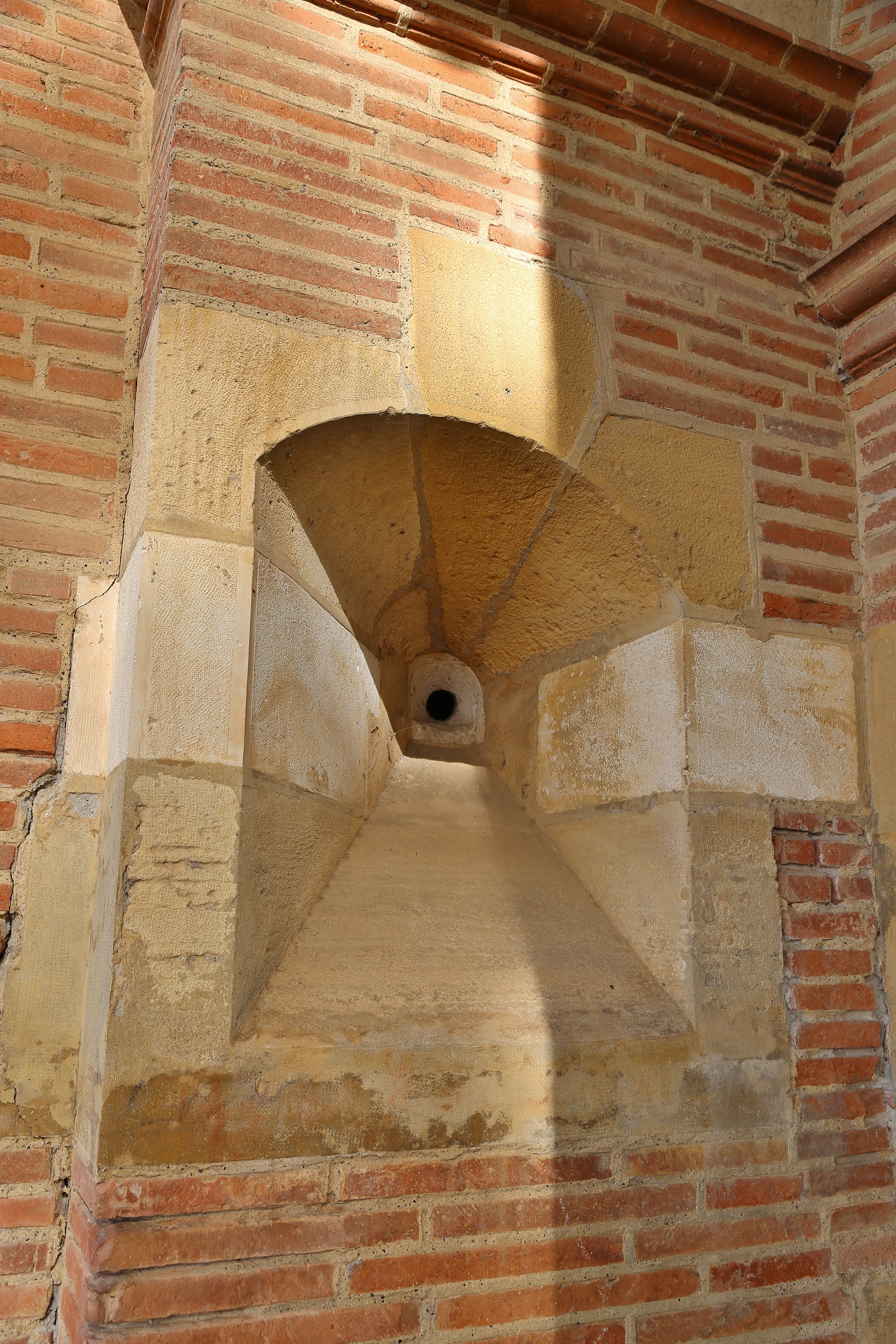
Detail of the Henry IV portal
Interior

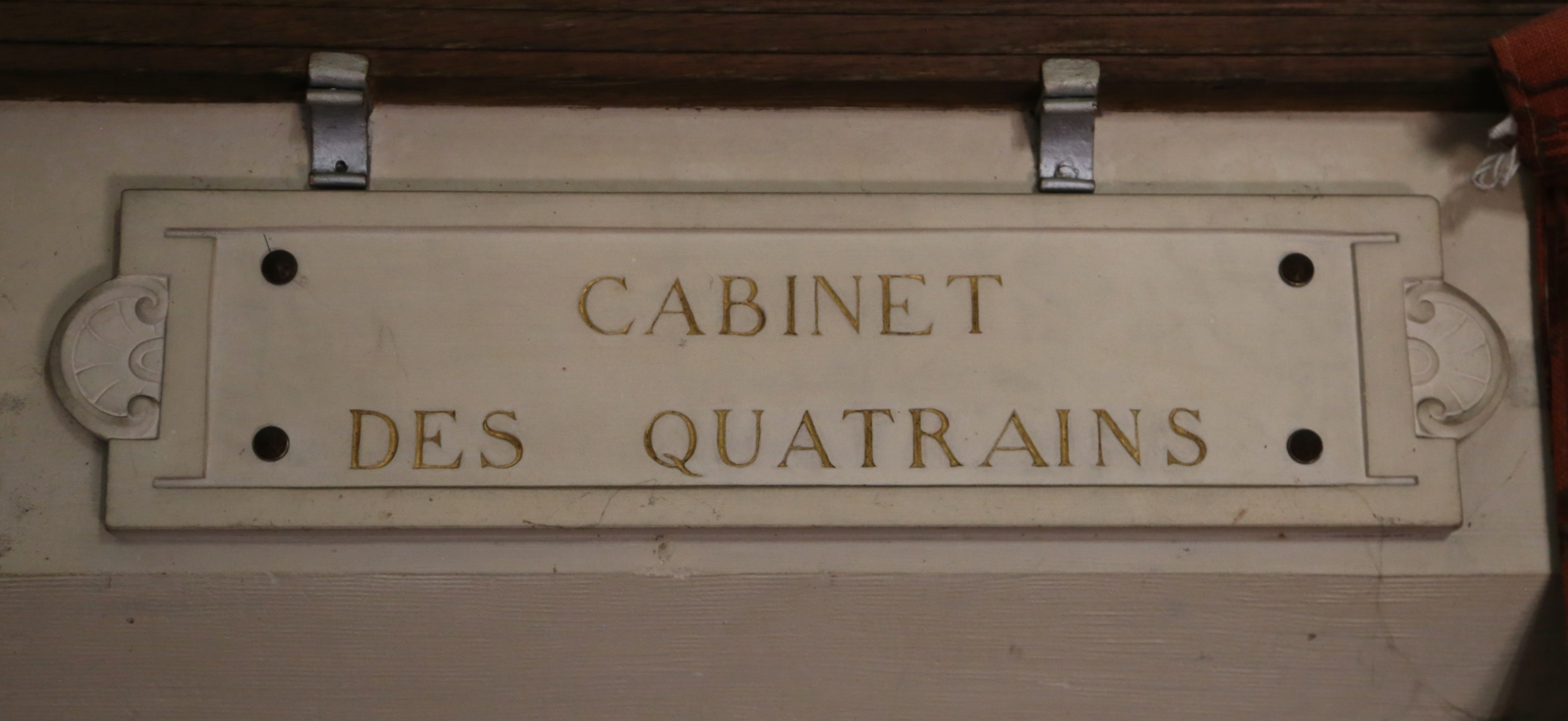
Plate of the cabinet of the Quatrains

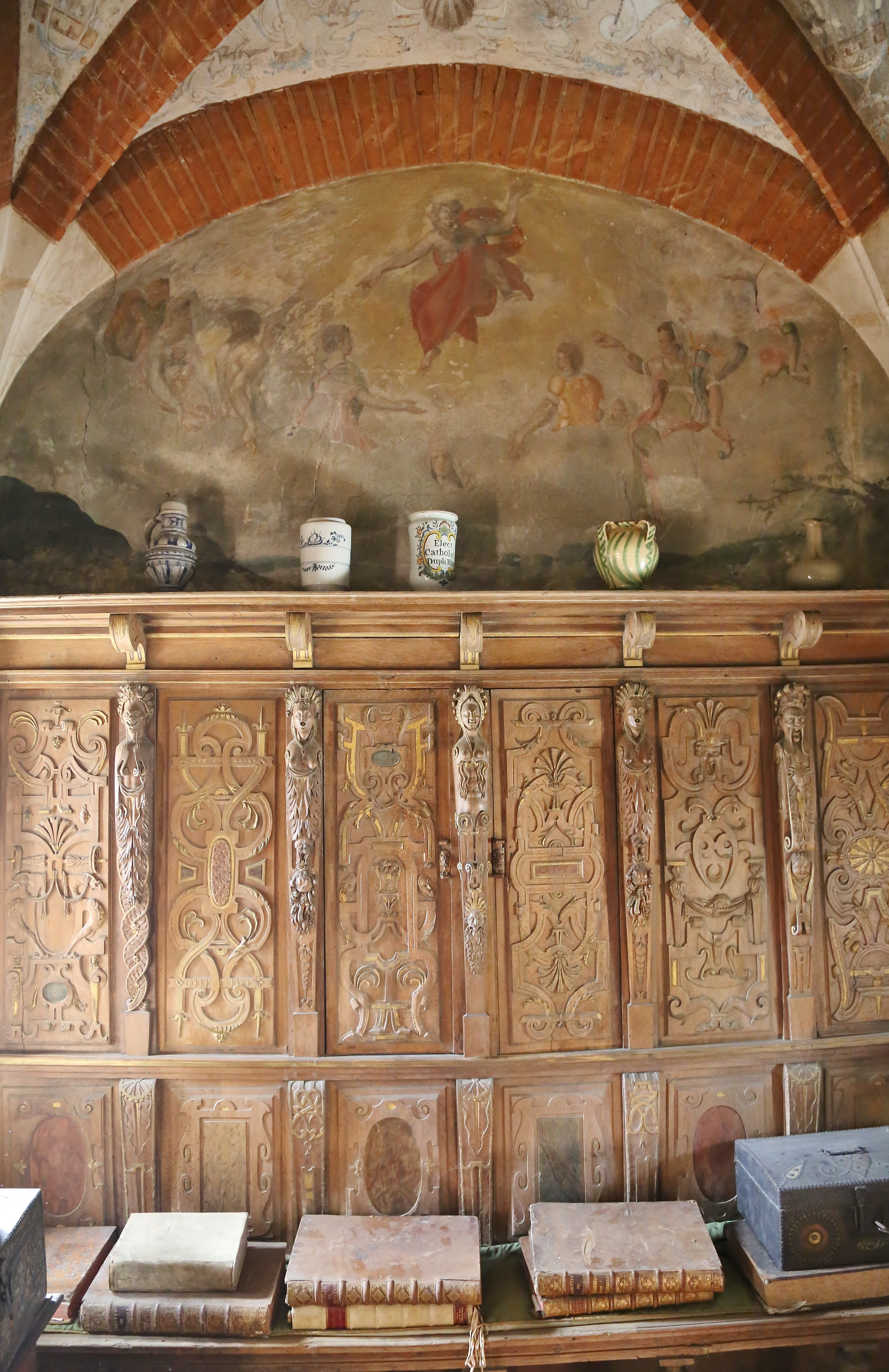
The cabinet of the Quatrains, 16th century

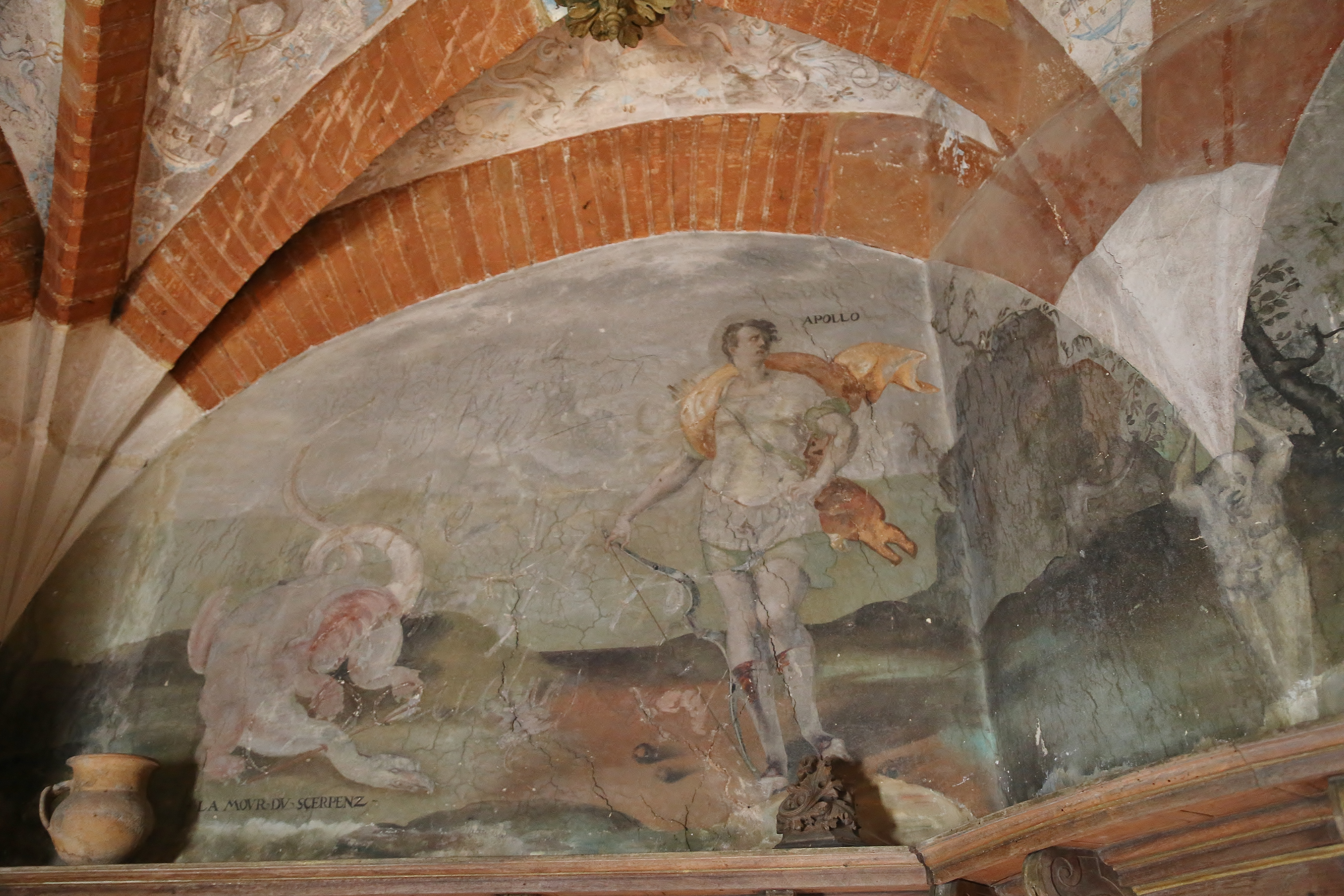
Wall decoration of the cabinet of the Quatrains

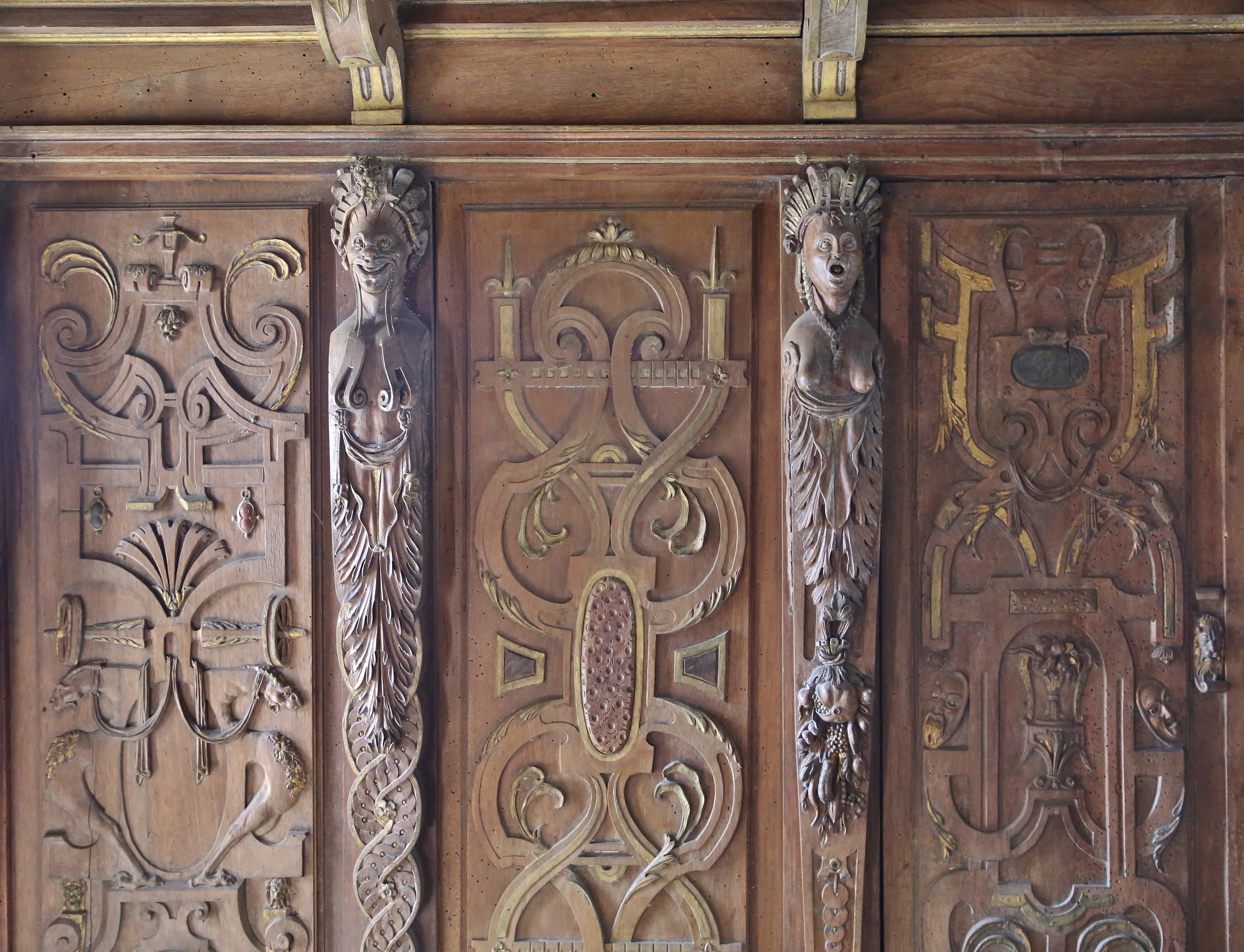
Detail of the woodwork of the Quatrains' cabinet

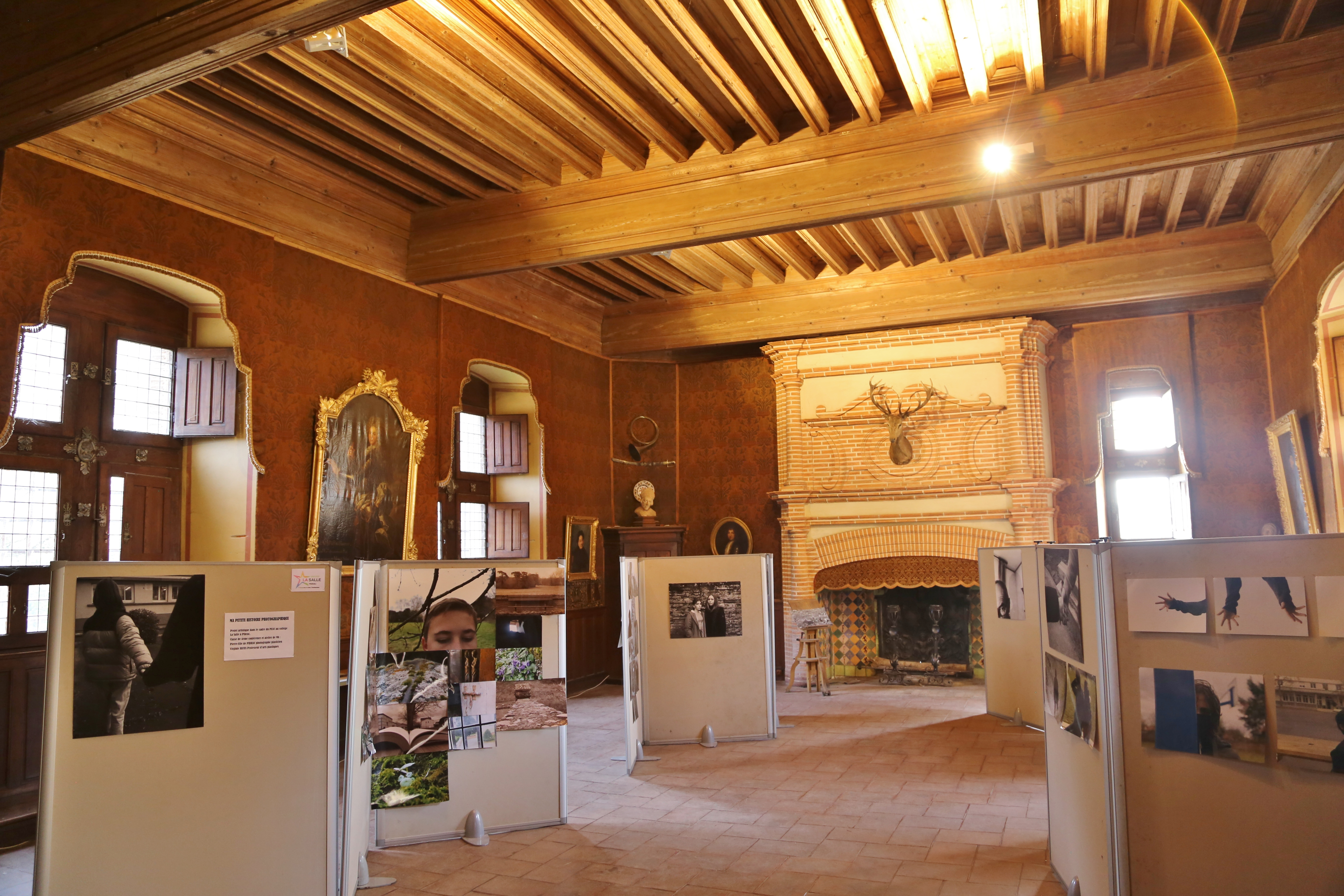
Guards' room

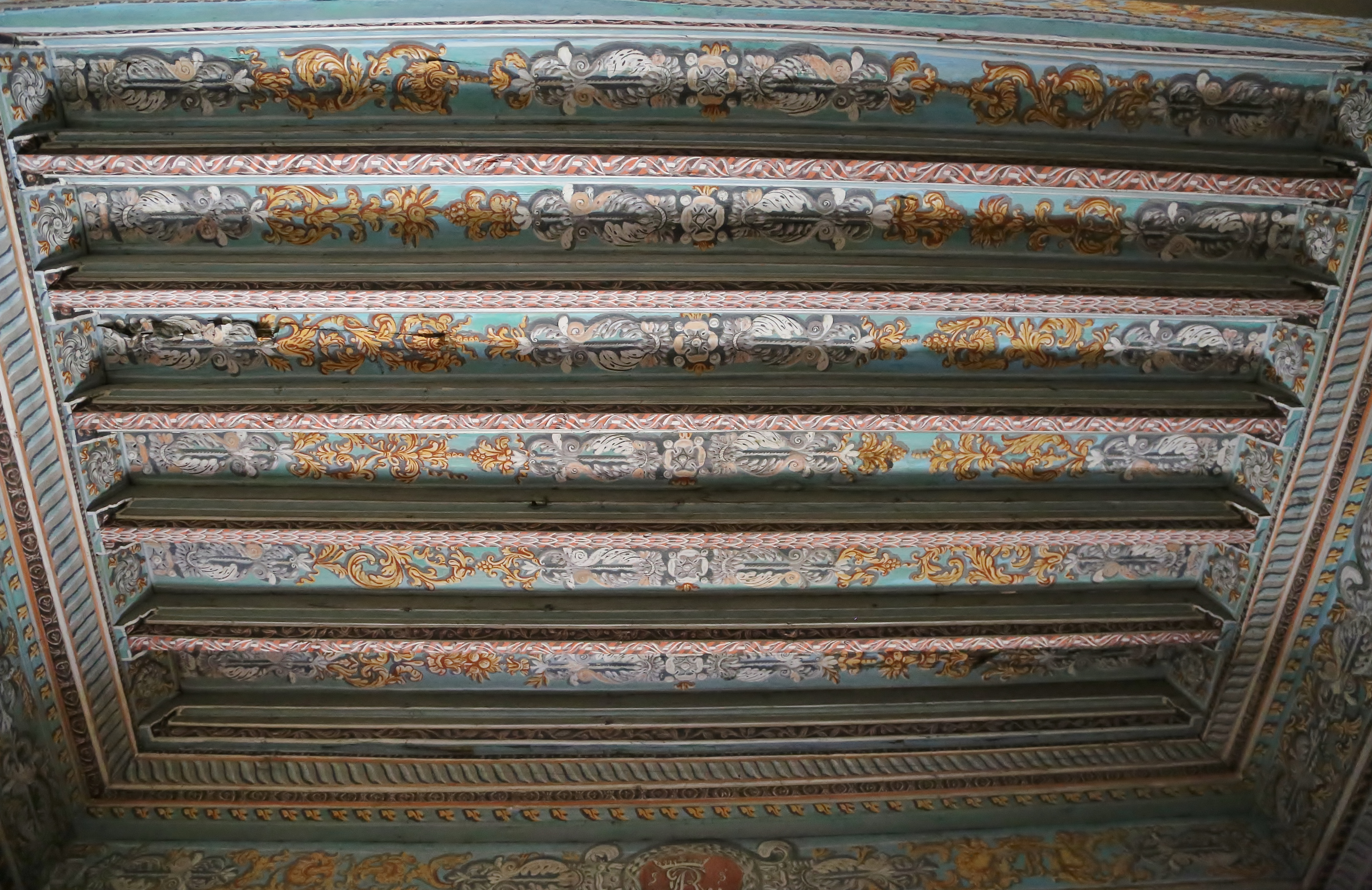
French-style ceiling

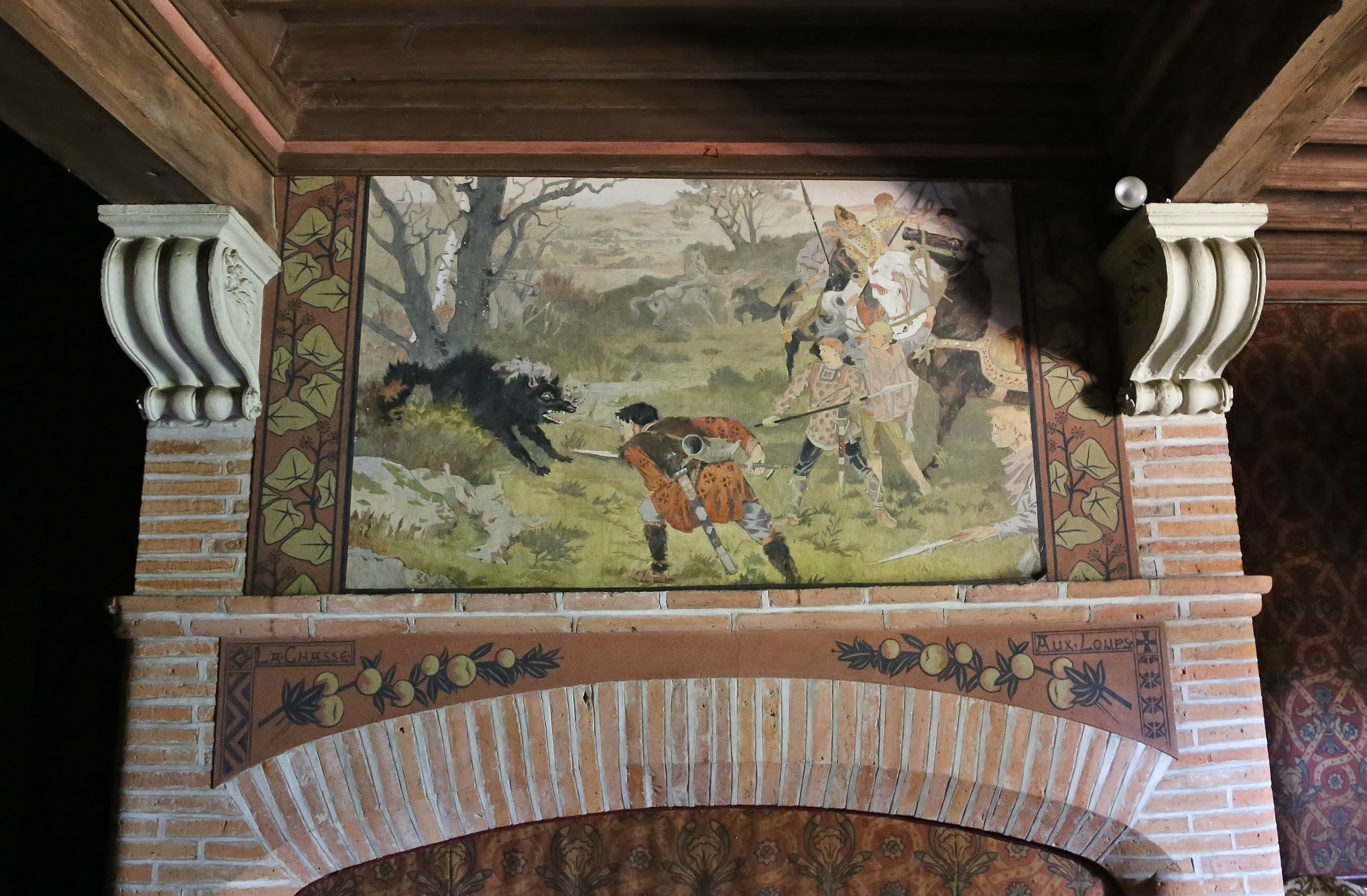
Mantelpiece decoration featuring a wolf hunt

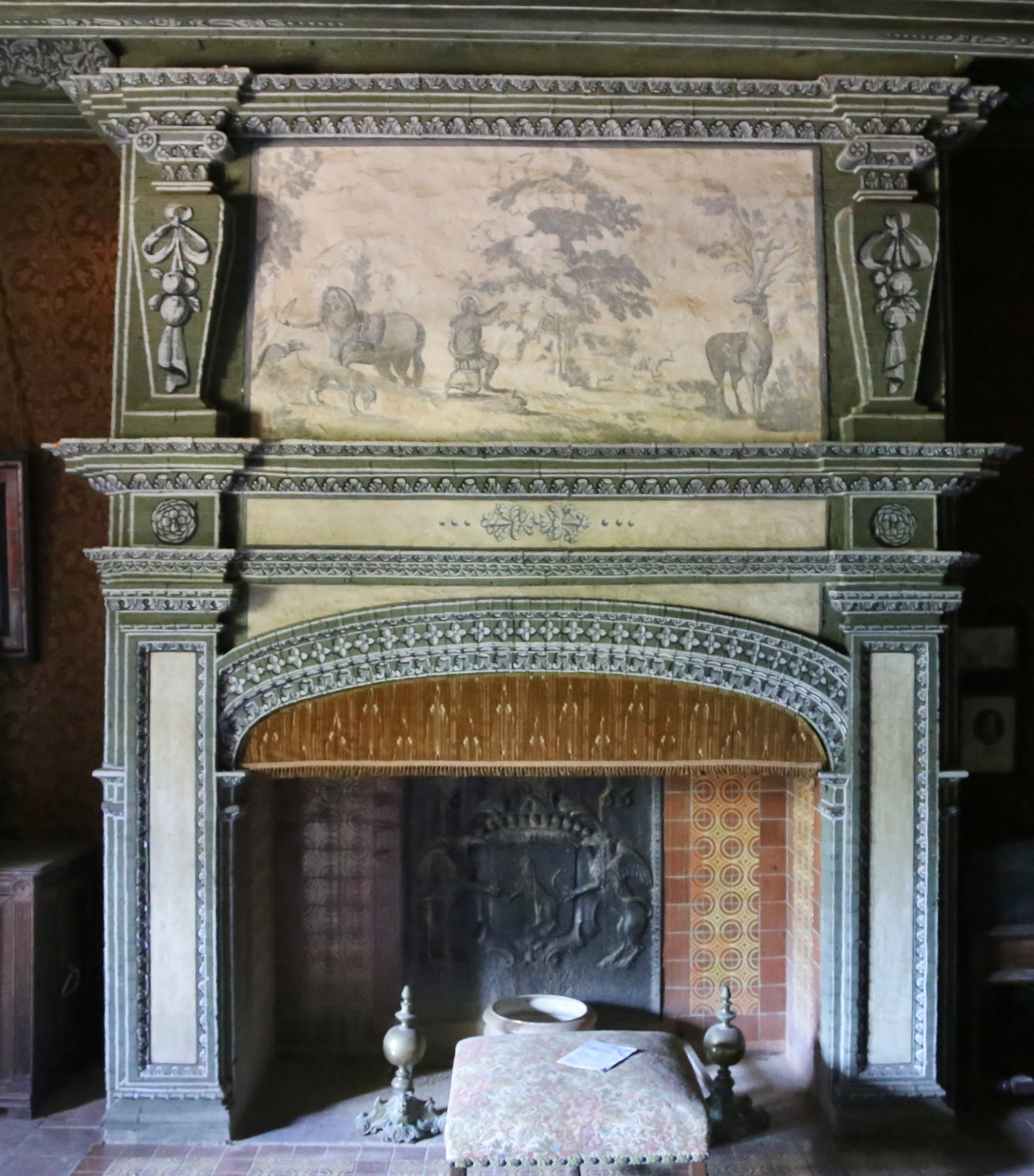
Decorated fireplace

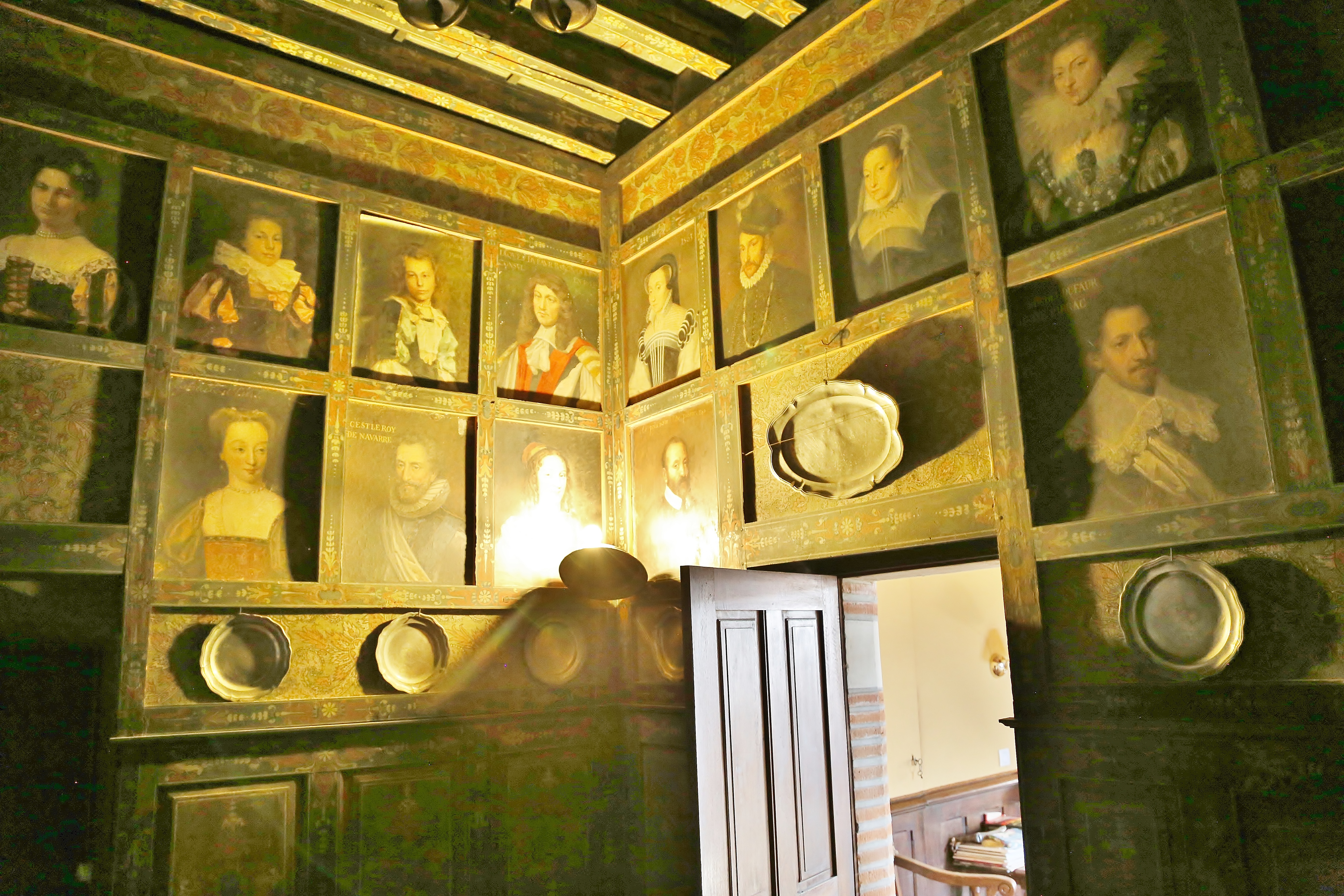
Ladies' cabinet

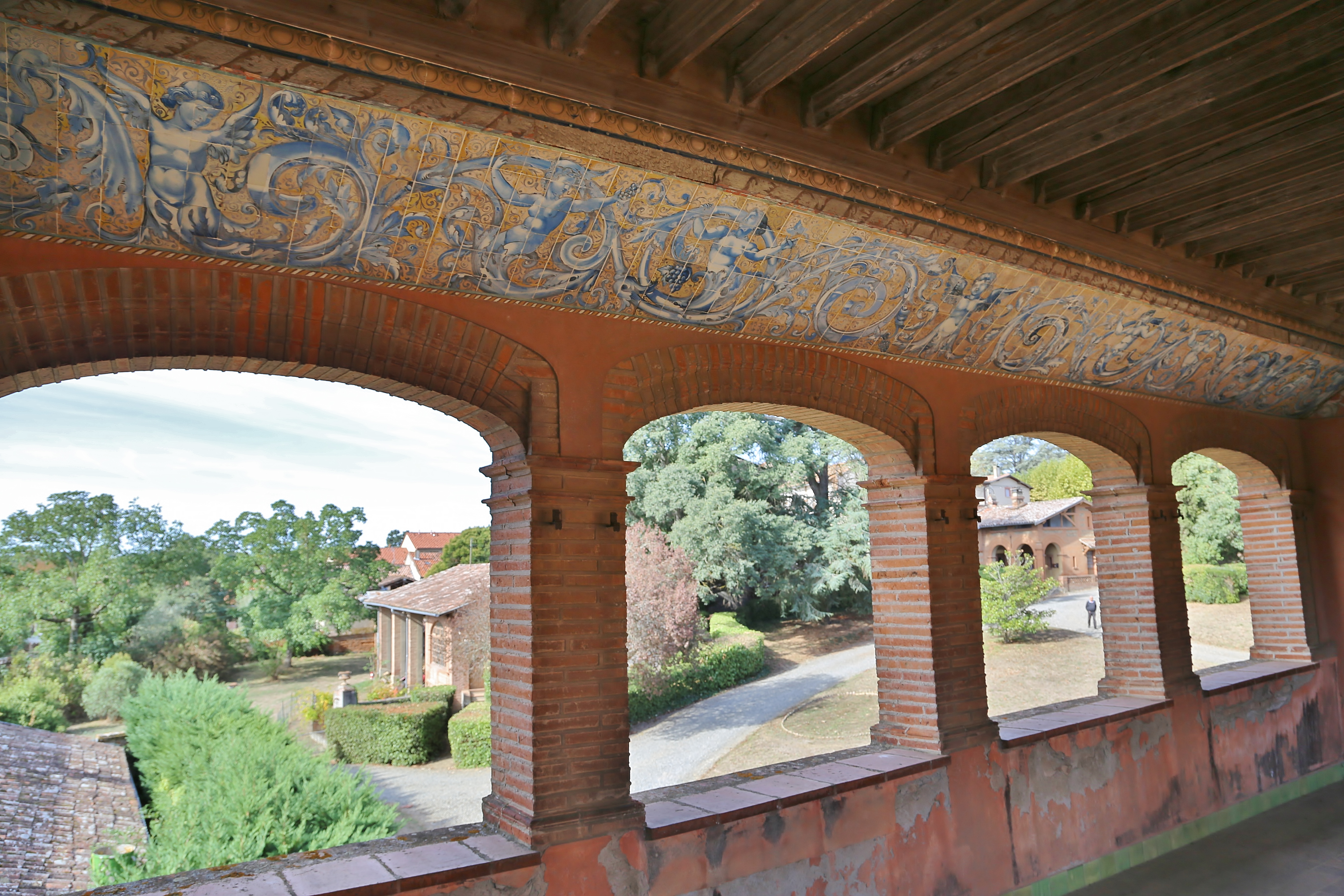
Open gallery on the first floor

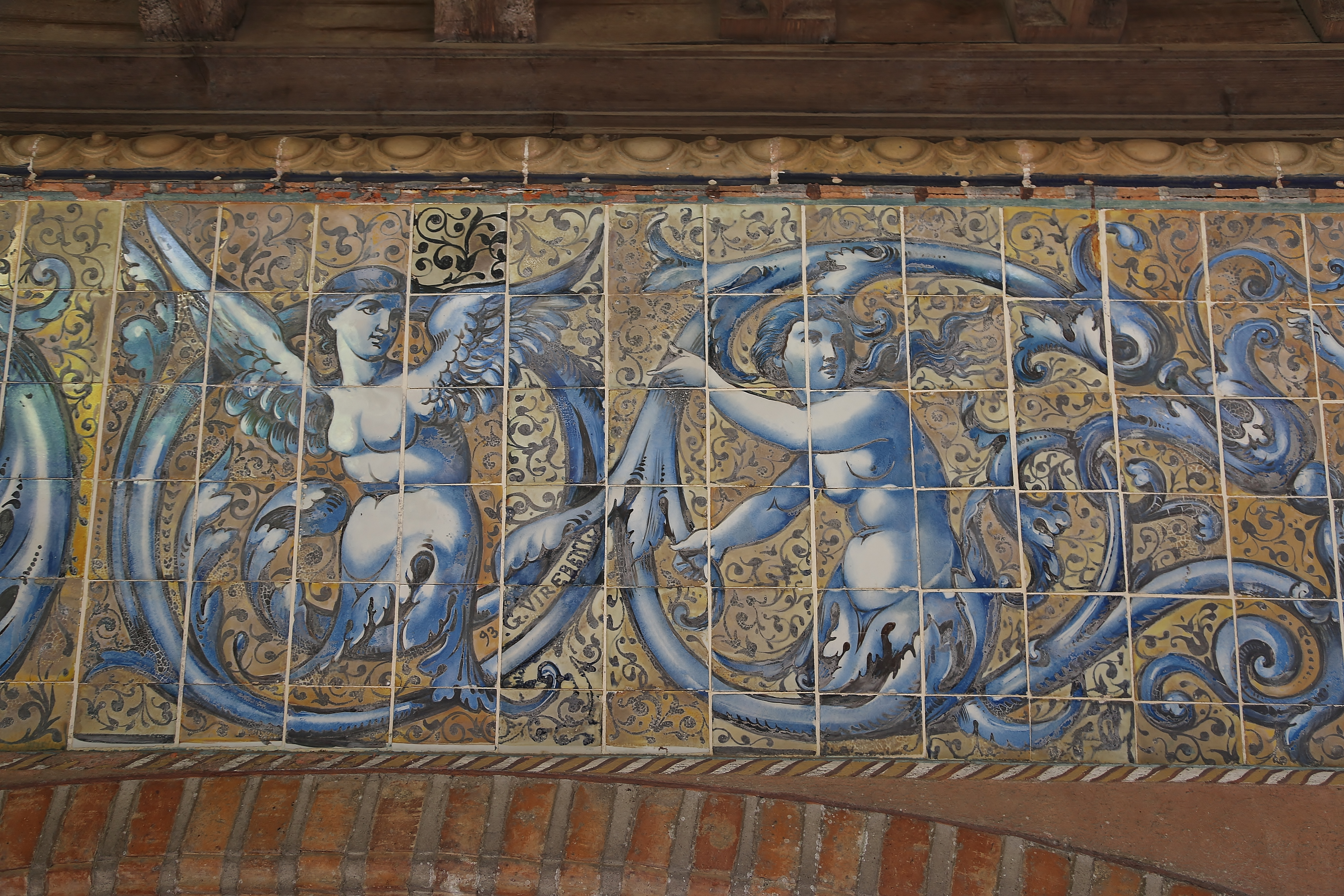
Ceramic decoration of the gallery (Gaston Virebent, 1893)
Archive images

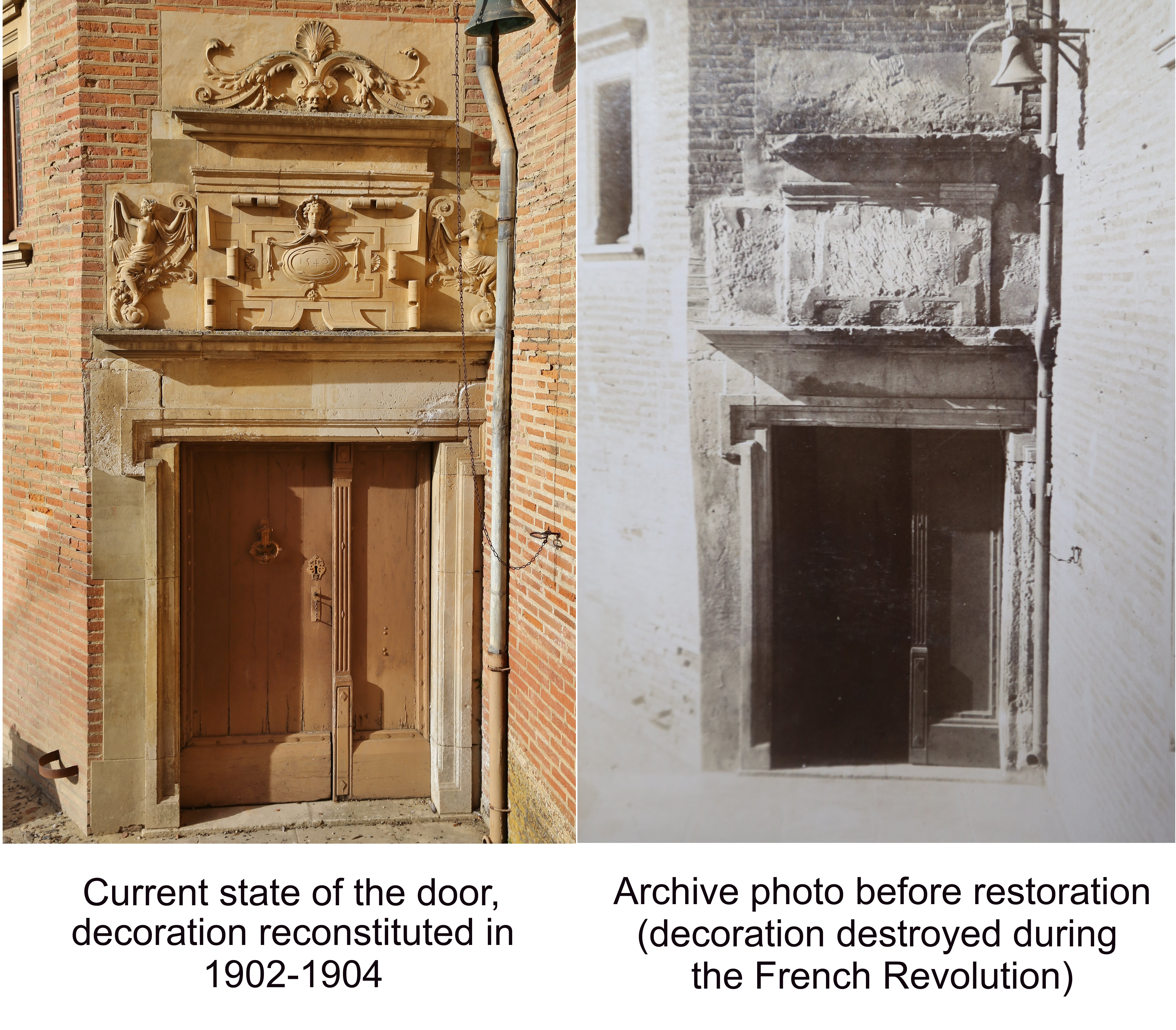
Restoration of the tower's door

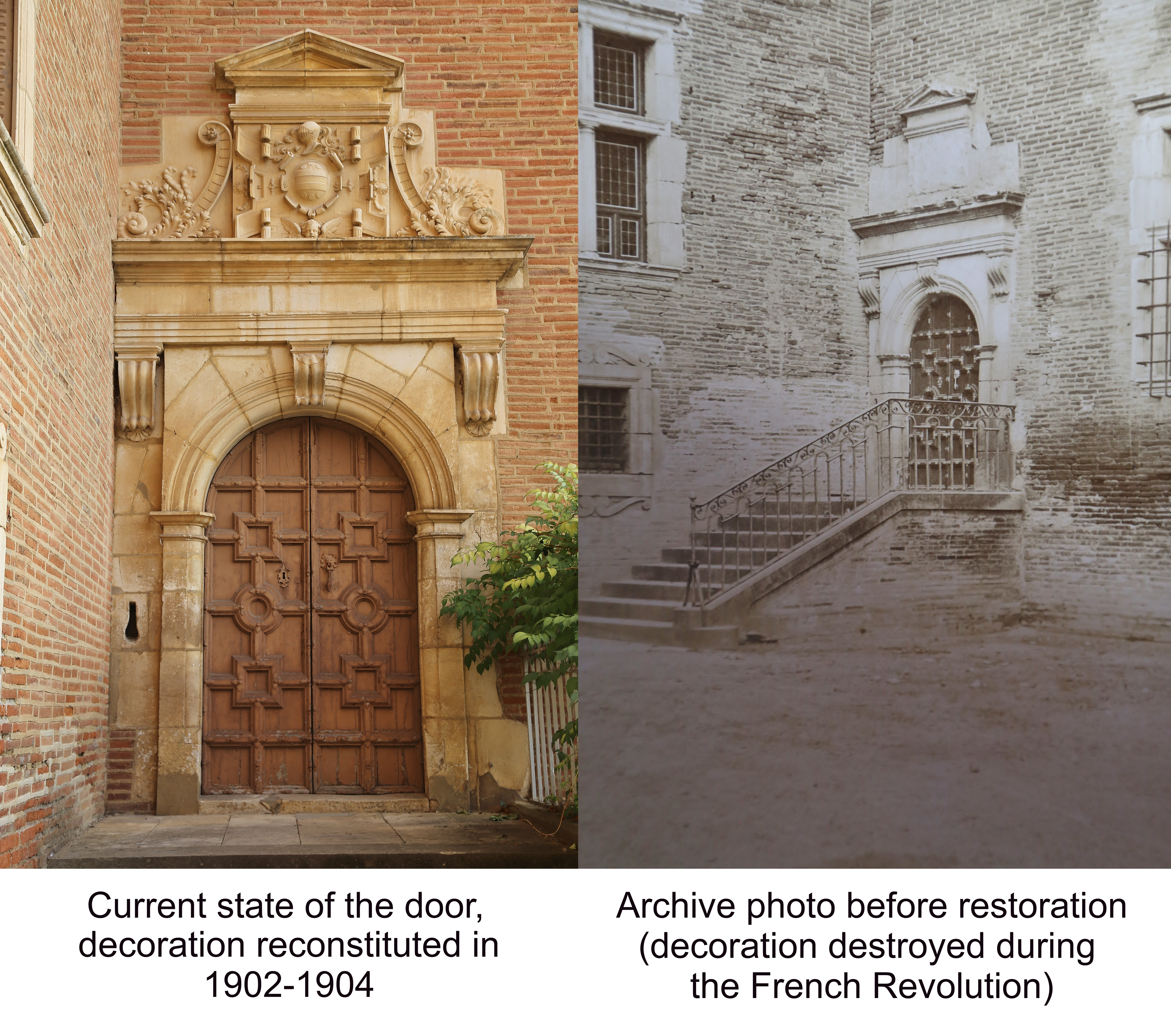
Restoration of the château's door

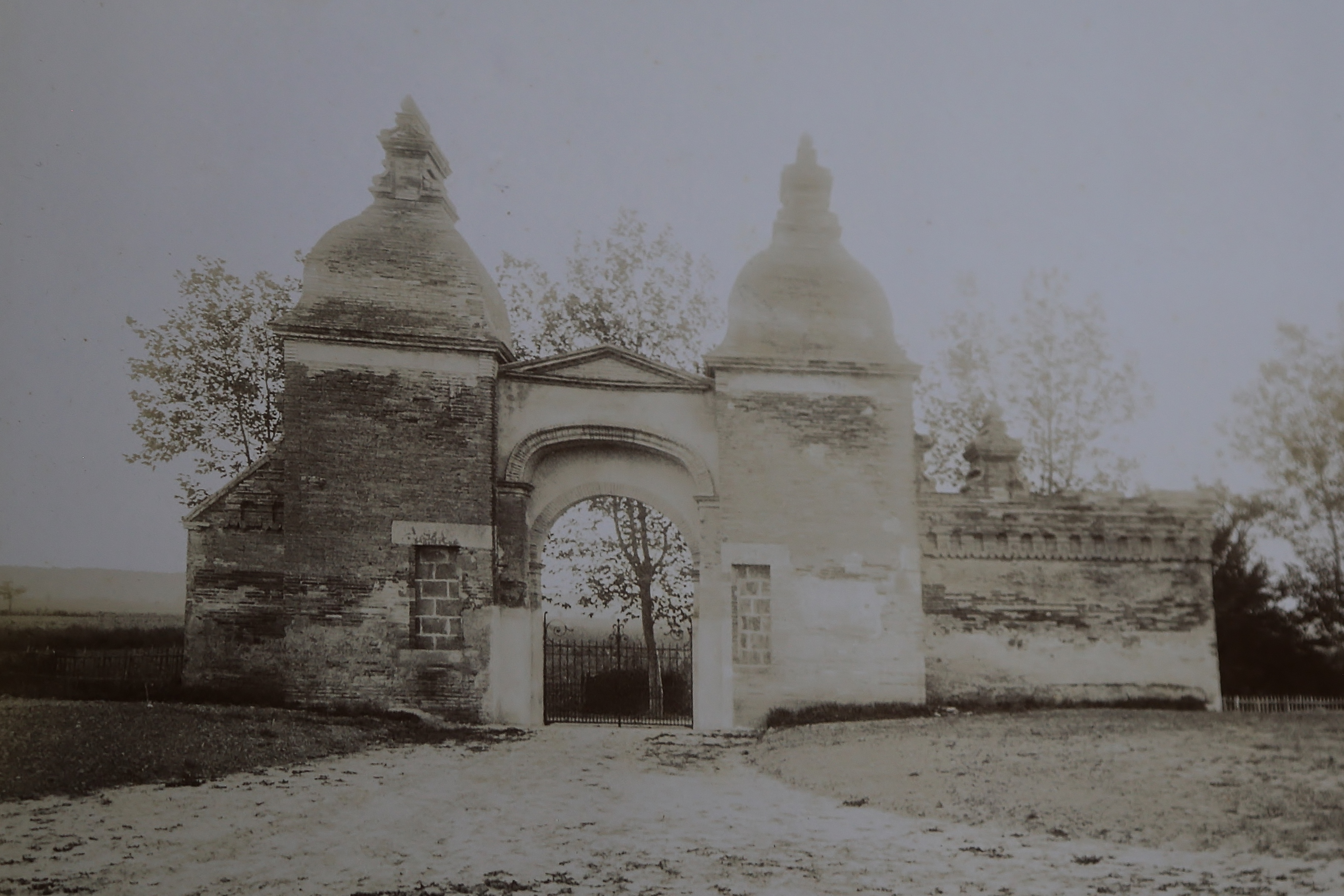
Former state of the Henry IV portal

== See also ==
- List of castles in France
- Renaissance architecture of Toulouse
- Guy Du Faur, Seigneur de Pibrac
