= Pietro Giuseppe Gaetano Boni =

Italian composer

Pietro Giuseppe Gaetano Boni (Bologna(?), second half XVII century – Bologna(?), around 1750) was an Italian composer who lived most if not all his life in the Papal States.

== Biography and career ==
Born probably in Bologna, on the title page of his published works he is qualified as abate (Abbot) and had a musical formation probably under the Accademia Filarmonica di Bologna, of which he was later a member.

Since 1711 he was in Rome with Arcangelo Corelli and stayed there until 1720 at least. He published in Rome three books of sonatas, the first one for violoncello and cembalo (1717). In 1719 his cantata Cantata per la notte di Natale was performed in Perugia and on 8 January 1720 his opera Tito Manlio at the Teatro della Pace in Rome, with libretto by Matteo Noris was performed. In 1726 his oratorio Santa Rosalia was performed in Bologna. Boni left a manuscript of instrumental works.

He is sometimes confused with Giovanni Boni. To Boni has been attributed the opera Il figlio delle selve, performed in Modena in 1700, but he is possibly confused with Cosimo Bani.

== Works ==
12 Sonate per camera a violoncello e cembalo, op. I, Roma, 1717

12 Divertimenti per camera a violino, violone, cimbalo, flauto e mandola, op. II, (1720), Antonio Cleton, Roma.

10 Sonate a violino e violone o cembalo, op. III, Fasoli, Roma, 1741

Sonate per cembalo, manuscript.

cantata: Cantata per la notte di Natale, Perugia, 1719

opera: Tito Manlio, libretto by Matteo Noris, Roma, 1720

oratorio: Santa Rosalia, Bologna, 1726
