= 1530s in music =

- 1520s
- 1530s in music
- 1540s

Music timeline

The decade of the 1530s in music (years 1530–1539) involved some significant events, publications, compositions, births, and deaths.

== Events ==
- 1532: Thomas Tallis takes his first known musical appointment, as organist at Dover Priory.
- 1533: Claudin de Sermisy appointed a canon at Sainte-Chapelle in Paris
- 1534: Nicolas Gombert appointed a canon of Notre-Dame in Tournai
- 1535: Cristobal Morales joins the papal choir at St Peter's basilica, Rome
- 1536: Pierre Certon appointed Master of the Choristers at Sainte Chapelle in Paris.
- 1538: Tallis moves from Dover to Waltham Abbey.
- Thomas Appleby appointed organist and choirmaster at Lincoln Cathedral
- 1539: Joan Brudieu appointed maestro di capilla at la Seu d'Urgell Cathedral in Catalonia, a position he held until his death (bar a couple of gaps) until his death in 1591.

== Publications ==
=== 1530 ===
- Madrigali de diversi musici: libro primo de la Serena (Rome: Valerio Dorico). The first book of madrigals to be identified by that name. The majority of pieces are by Philippe Verdelot.

=== 1532 ===
- Carpentras
  - First book of masses (Avignon: Jean de Channay)
  - Lamentations for five voices (Avignon: Jean de Channay)
- Hans Gerle – Musica Teusch (Nuremberg: Hieronymous Formschneider), an instructional book for playing and arranging for the viola, rebec, and lute
- Sebald Heyden – De arte canendi: Rudimenta, first installment of an important treatise on singing

=== 1533 ===
- Hans Gerle - 2nd collection of lute music Tabulatur auff die Laudten published in Nuremberg. It included arrangements of pieces by Jean Mouton, Josquin and Jacob Obrecht
- Clement Janequin – Vingt et quatre chansons musicales...composes par maistre CL Janequin published by Pierre Attaignant in Paris
- Philippe Verdelot – First book of madrigals for four voices, published by Ottaviano Scotto in Venice

=== 1534 ===
- Philippe Verdelot – Second book of madrigals for four voices, published by Scotto in Venice

=== 1535 ===
- Silvestro Ganassi dal Fontego – Opera intitulata Fontegara, a treatise on recorder playing, published in Venice
- Philippe Verdelot – First book of madrigals for five voices, published by Scotto in Venice

=== 1536 ===
- Sebastian z Felsztyna – treatise 'De Musica Dialogi VI'
- Luis de Milán – El Maestro (Valencia: Francisco Diaz Romano), the first collection of music for the vihuela
- Francesco da Milano – Five volumes of lute music published in Milan
- Hans Neusidler – Two books of lute music, Ein newgeordent künstlich Lautenbuch and Der ander Theil des Lautenbuchs.

=== 1537 ===
- Carpentras – August 25: Libro de canti a tre (Book of songs for three voices) (Rome: Valerio & Luigi Dorico)
- Sebald Heyden – De arte canendi, second installment, important treatise on singing
- Clement Janequin – Les Chansons de la Guerre, La Chasse, Le Chant des Oyseaux, L'Alouette, Le Rossignol, published by Pierre Attaignment in Paris
- Philippe Verdelot – Second book of madrigals for five voices published by Scotto in Venice

=== 1538 ===
- Luis de Narváez – Los seys libros del Delphin (Valladolid: Diego Hernandez), a large collection of lute music
- Philippe Verdelot – Le dotte, et eccellente compositioni...
- Ein Hubsch new Gesangbuch, the first Protestant hymn-book, published in Ulm.

=== 1539 ===
- Jacques Arcadelt
  - First book of madrigals for four voices (Venice: Antonio Gardano), the most reprinted madrigal book of the sixteenth century
  - Second book of madrigals for four voices (Venice: Antonio Gardano)
  - Third book of madrigals for four voices (Venice: Girolamo Scotto)
  - Fourth book of madrigals for four voices (Venice: Antonio Gardano)
- Noel Bauldeweyn – Missa da Pacem (Nuremberg: Ott, RISM 1539^{2}). Published under the name of Josquin des Prez.
- Jean Calvin – First edition of 'The Geneva Psalter'
- Alfonso dalla Viola – First book of madrigals for four voices (Ferrara: Henrico De Campis & Antonio Hucher for Giovanni De Buglhat)
- Georg Forster – First volume of his 'Fresh German Songs' published in Nuremberg
- Nicolas Gombert
  - First book of motets for four voices (Venice: Girolamo Scotto)
  - First book of motets for five voices (Venice: Girolamo Scotto)
- Paul Hofhaimer – collection of musical settings of the odes of Horace 'Harmoniae Poeticae', published in Nuremberg
- Jacquet of Mantua
  - First book of motets for five voices (Venice: Girolamo Scotto)
  - First book of motets for four voices (Venice: Girolamo Scotto)
- Pierre de Manchicourt – Book 14: 19 Motets for four voices (Paris: Pierre Attaingnant & Hubert Jullet), the last volume in Attaingnant's motet series and the only one dedicated to a single composer

== Classical music ==
=== 1530 ===
- We-Liang-Hu composed music for a play by 14th-century poet Gao Ming.

== Sacred music ==
=== 1533 ===
- Nicolas Gombert – Cuis colis Ausoniam, motet for six voices to a text by Nicolaus Grudius, celebrating the treaty signed in Bologna by Emperor Charles V, Pope Clement VII, and several other Italian rulers

=== 1539 ===
- Johannes Heugel – Consolamini, popule meus, for eight voices, probably the earliest German composition for double choir
- Costanzo Festa – Hyntni per totum annum

== Births ==
- c.1530: Juan Navarro, Spanish composer (d. 1580)
- c.1530: Nicolas de La Grotte, French composer and keyboard player (d. c. 1600)
- c.1530: Richard Farrant, English composer of church music, choirmaster, playwright and theatre producer (d.1580)
- c.1530: Guillaume Costeley, French composer and organist (d. 1606)
- 1530: Teodora Ginés, Dominican musician and composer (d. 1598)
- 1531: Ercole Bottrigari, Italian scholar, mathematician, poet, music theorist, architect and composer (d. 1612)
- c.1520/31: Guillaume Costeley, French composer (d. 1606)
- c.1531/32: Jacobus de Kerle, Flemish composer, organist, choirmaster and priest (d.1591)
- 1532: Hernando Franco, Spanish composer and choirmaster. The earliest known composer of music in Guatemala (d.1585)
  - December 5 – Nikolaus Selnecker, German theologian, hymn-writer, organist and cleric (d.1592)
  - February 19 – Jean-Antonie de Baif, French poet, co-founder of the Academie de Poesie et de Musique in Paris (d. 1589)
  - January 21 – Ludwig Hembold, German poet and hymn writer (d. 1598)
  - March 25 – Pietro Pontio, Italian theorist and composer (d. 1596)
  - date unknown – Giammateo Asola, Italian composer (d. 1609)
  - probable – Orlando de Lassus a.k.a. Roland de Latre, Franco-Flemish composer of late Renaissance music (d. 1594)
- Adam Puschmann, German poet, songwriter and Meistersinger (d. 1600)
- c.1532 David Koler, German composer and Kapellmeister (d. 1565)
- c. 1530–40: Giorgio Mainerio, Italian composer (d. 1582)
- 1533:
  - date unknown – Alessandro Romano, Italian composer, singer, and violist (d. 1592)
- c.1533 Laurent de Vos, Flemish composer, singer and musician (d. 1580)
- October 16 – Gallus Dressler, German composer, theorist and cantor. (d. 1580s)
  - April 8 – Claudio Merulo, Italian organist, composer and publisher (d. 1604)
  - date unknown - Andrea Gabrieli, Italian composer and organist (d. 1585)
- 1534: Lodovico Agostini, Italian composer (d. 1590)
  - Giovanni De' Bardi, Italian writer, composer and soldier. Host and patron of the Florentine Camerata.
  - Lucas Osiander, German Protestant theologian and hymn composer. Born Nuremberg. (d. 1604)
  - Fernando de Las Infantas, Spanish composer, theologian, priest and philanthropist. Born Cordoba. (d. c. 1610)
- c.1534 Christian Ameyden, Flemish composer, tenor and choirmaster. Born Aerschot, Belgium. (d. 1605)
- 1535 Annibale Stabile, Italian composer, singer, choirmaster and priest. Born Naples. (d. 1595)
  - c.1535
  - c.1535 Cesare Negri, Italian dancing master (d. c. 1604)
  - c.1535 Marc'Antonio Ingegneri, Italian composer, teacher and choirmaster (d. 1592).
  - Antoine de Bertrand, French composer (d. 1581)
  - Bernhard Schmid the Elder, German organist and music editor (d. 1592)
  - Giaches de Wert, Flemish composer of Italian madrigals (d. 1596)
  - probable – Innocentio Alberti, Italian instrumentalist and composer (d. 1615)
- 1536: Zhu Zaiyu, Chinese prince, music theorist, scholar and writer (d. 1611)
  - Alessandro Striggio, Italian composer, viol player and diplomat (d. 1592)
- 1537: Johann Wanning, Dutch-born composer, kapellmeister and alto singer (d. 1603)
  - Annibale Zoilo, Italian composer, singer and choirmaster (d. 1592)
- 1538 Stefano Felis, Italian composer, singer and choirmaster (d. 1603)
  - c.1538 Johannes Matelart, Flemish composer and choirmaster (d. 1607)
  - c.1538 Robert White, English composer and choirmaster (d. 1574)
- 1539
  - December 20 – Paulus Melissus, writer and composer (d. 1602)
  - c.1539 Paschal de L'Estocart, French composer (d. c. 1587)
  - c.1539 Ippolito Tartaglino, Italian composer (d. c. 1580)

== Deaths ==
- c.1530 Noel Bauldewijn, Flemish composer (b. c. 1480).
- c.1530 Antonius Divitis, court composer of Louis XII of France (b. 1470).
- 1533:
  - September 20 - Nicolas Champion, composer and singer, (b. c. 1475).
- c.1535:
  - Pedro de Escobar (b. 1465).
  - Bartolomeo Tromboncino (b. 1470).
- 1536:
  - May 17 – Mark Smeaton, English court musician (b. c. 1512; executed for alleged adultery with Anne Boleyn)
  - June 26 – Pierre Alamire, German-Dutch music copyist, composer, instrumentalist, mining engineer, merchant, diplomat and spy (b. c. 1470)
- 1537: Paul Hofhaimer, Austrian composer and organist (b. 1459).
- 1538:
  - March – Hans Buchner, organist and composer (b. 1483).
  - October – Maistre Jhan, composer (b. c. 1485)
  - Richard Davy, composer (b. c. 1465).
- 1539:
  - December 12 – Bartolomeo degli Organi, composer, singer and organist (b. 1474).
  - December 20 – Johannes Lupi, composer (b. c. 1506; chronic illness)
  - Ottaviano Petrucci – printer and publisher (b. 1466)
  - c.1539 Andrea Antico – publisher, editor and composer (b. c. 1480)
  - c.1539 Dionisio Memmo – Italian organist and choirmaster. Worked in the court of Henry VIII
