= 1598 in music =

List of years in music	(table)
- … 1588; 1589; 1590; 1591; 1592; 1593; 1594; 1595; 1596; 1597; 1598; 1599; 1600; 1601; 1602; 1603; 1604; 1605; 1606; 1607; 1608 …
- Art; Archaeology; Architecture; Literature; Music; Philosophy; Science; +...

== Events ==
- Thomas Weelkes becomes organist at Winchester College.
- The "first documented European music education" in the United States begins in a colony in New Mexico, founded by a group of Spanish friars accompanying Juan de Oñate.

== Publications ==
- Gregor Aichinger – Tricinia Mariana (Innsbruck: Johannes Agricola), a collection of antiphons, hymns, Magnificats, and litanies for the Office of the Blessed Virgin, for three voices
- Felice Anerio – Madrigals for three voices (Venice: Giacomo Vincenti)
- Giovanni Artusi – First book of canzonettas for four voices (Venice: Giacomo Vincenti)
- Giammateo Asola
  - Introitus in dominicis diebus totius anni... (Introits for the Sundays of the whole year) for four voices (Venice: Ricciardo Amadino)
  - In omnibus totius anni solemnitatibus Introitus et Alleluia ad Missalis Romani formam ordinati... (Introits and Alleluias for all the solemnities of the year...) (Venice: Ricciardo Amadino)
  - Completorium romanum primus et secundus chorus (Venice: Ricciardo Amadino), music for Compline, including an Alma Redemptoris Mater and an Ave Regina caelorum
- Adriano Banchieri
  - Psalms for five voices (Venice: Ricciardo Amadino), includes pieces for Vespers for the entire year
  - La pazzia senile, second book for three voices (Venice: Ricciardi Amadino), a madrigal comedy
- Giovanni Bassano – Motetti per concerti ecclesiastici for five, six, seven, eight, and twelve voices (Venice: Giacomo Vincenti)
- Giulio Belli – Psalmi ad vesperas in totius anni solemnitatibus for five voices (Venice: Ricciardo Amadino), Psalms for Vespers for the whole year, also includes two Magnificats and a Te Deum
- Michael Cavendish – Ayres in Tabletorie
- Scipione Dentice – Third book of madrigals for five voices (Naples: Giovanni Giacomo Carlino & Antonio Pace)
- Johannes Eccard
  - Epithalamion (Wer rechte Freud wil habn) for five voices (Königsberg, Georg Osterberger), a wedding song
  - Der CXXVIII Psalm, zu hochzeitlichen Ehren (Selig ist der gepreiset) for five voices (Königsberg, Georg Osterberger), a wedding song
  - Braudt Lied (Gott selber hat auss höchstem Rath) for four voices (Königsberg, Georg Osterberger), a wedding song
- Giles Farnaby – [20] Canzonets to Fowre Voyces with a Song of Eight Parts (London: Peter Short), with a dedicatory poem in Latin by Anthony Holborne
- Bartholomäus Gesius – Der Lobgesang Mariae (Meine Seel erhebt den Herren, Herr Gott dich loben wir) und andere geistliche Lieder (Marian hymns) for five voices (Frankfurt an der Oder: Andreas Eichorn), also includes a New Year's motet for eight voices
- Claude Le Jeune – Dodécacorde (La Rochelle: Hierosme Haultin), a collection of twelve psalms for two, three, four, five, six, and seven voices
- Luzzasco Luzzaschi – First book of motets for five voices (Venice: Angelo Gardano)
- Luca Marenzio – Eighth book of madrigals for five voices (Venice: Angelo Gardano)
- Tiburtio Massaino – Third book of masses for five voices (Venice: Ricciardo Amadino)
- Claudio Merulo – Toccate d’Intavolatura d’Organo, Book 1 (Rome: Simone Verovio)
- Philippe de Monte – Nineteenth book of madrigals for five voices (Venice: Angelo Gardano)
- Peter Philips – Madrigals for eight voices (Antwerp: Pierre Phalèse)
- Orfeo Vecchi
  - Second book of masses for five voices (Milan: heirs of Simon Tini & Giovanni Francesco Besozzi)
  - Second book of motets for five voices (Milan: heirs of Simon Tini & Giovanni Francesco Besozzi)
  - Third book of motets for six voices (Milan: heirs of Simon Tini & Giovanni Francesco Besozzi)
- Thomas Weelkes – Balletts And Madrigals to five voyces
- John Wilbye – The First Set Of English Madrigals To 3. 4. 5. and 6. voices

== Opera ==
- Jacopo Peri (and Jacopo Corsi) – Dafne, the earliest known modern opera

== Births ==
- April 9 – Johann Crüger, composer of hymns (died 1662)
- date unknown
  - Charles d'Helfer, French baroque composer and maître de musique at Soissons Cathedral (died 1661)
  - Charles Racquet, organist and composer (died 1664)
  - Jan Vencálek, composer for lute and voice (date of death unknown)

== Deaths ==
- April 8 – Ludwig Helmbold, poet of chorales (born 1532)
- May 3 – Anna Guarini, virtuoso singer (born 1563)
- December – Giovanni Dragoni, composer and maestro di cappella (born c.1540)
- date unknown
  - Adrian Le Roy, French music publisher, lutenist, guitarist, composer and music educator (born c.1520)
  - Christoph Fischer or Vischer, hymnist (born c.1518/1520)
- probable – Simon Bar Jona Madelka, composer
  - Teodora Ginés, Dominican musician and composer (born c. 1530)
