= 1599 in music =

List of years in music	(table)
- … 1589; 1590; 1591; 1592; 1593; 1594; 1595; 1596; 1597; 1598; 1599; 1600; 1601; 1602; 1603; 1604; 1605; 1606; 1607; 1608; 1609 …
- Art; Archaeology; Architecture; Literature; Music; Philosophy; Science; +...

== Events ==
- Claudio Monteverdi marries court singer Claudia Cattaneo,
- Gregor Aichinger begins a two-year sojourn in Rome.

== Publications ==
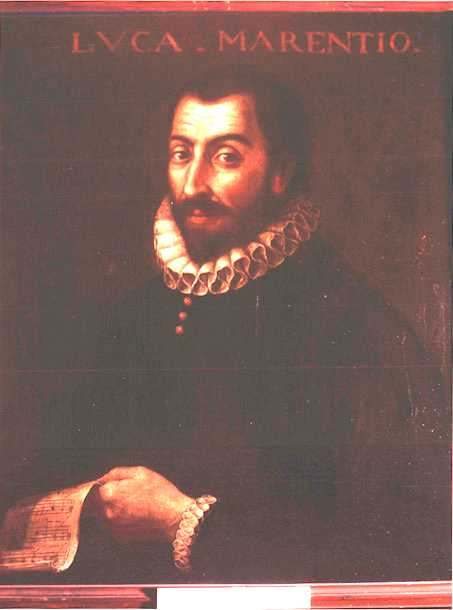
Luca Marenzio

- Richard Allison – The psalmes of David in meter
- Giovanni Francesco Anerio – First book of madrigals for five voices (Venice: Ricciardo Amadino)
- Giammateo Asola
  - Nova omnium solemnitatum vespertina psalmodia (New Vespers psalms for all solemnities) for six voices (Venice: Ricciardo Amadino)
  - Secundi chori vespertinae omnium solemnitatum psalmodiae for three voices (Venice: Ricciardo Amadino)
- Adriano Banchieri – Messa solenne for eight voices (Venice: Ricciardo Amadino)
- Giovanni Bassano – Second book of Concerti ecclesiastici for five, six, seven, eight, and twelve voices (Venice: Giacomo Vincenti)
- Lodovico Bellanda – Canzonette spirituali for two, three, and four voices (Verona: Francesco Dalle Donne & Scipione Vargnano)
- Giulio Belli – First book of masses for four voices (Venice: Angelo Gardano)
- John Bennet – Madrigalls to Foure Voyces
- Valerio Bona – Fourth book of canzonettas for three voices (Milan: Simon Tini & Francesco Besozzi)
- Joachim a Burck – Quadraginta Odae catecheticae in laudem Dei, et piae iuventutis usum (Forty catechetical odes in praise of God for use by pious youth) for four voices (Mühlhausen: Hieronymous Reinhard), texts by Ludwig Helmbold
- Giovanni Paolo Cima – First book of motets for four voices (Milan: Agostino Tradate)
- Giovanni Croce – Masses for five and six voices (Venice: Giacomo Vincenti)
- Baldassare Donato – First book of motets for five, six, and eight voices (Venice: Angelo Gardano)
- Johannes Eccard – Hochzeit Liedt (Gleichwie ein Schütz) for six voices (Königsberg, Georg Osterberger), a wedding song
- Thomas Elsbeth
  - Neue Ausserlesene Weltliche Lieder (Exceptional New Secular Songs) for five voices (Frankfurt an der Oder: Friedrich Hartmann)
  - Neue geistliche, zu Christlicher Andacht bewegende Lieder (New Spiritual Songs that Evoke Christian Devotion) for five voices (Frankfurt an der Oder: Friedrich Hartmann)
- John Farmer – The First Set Of English Madrigals: To Foure Voices (London: William Barley for Thomas Morley)
- Ruggiero Giovannelli – Third book of madrigals for five voices (Venice: Giacomo Vincenti)
- Hans Leo Hassler – Masses for four, five, six, and eight voices (Nuremberg: Paul Kauffman)
- Anthony Holborne – Pavans, Galliards, Almains and other short Aeirs, both grave and light, in five parts, for Viols, Violins, or other Musicall Winde Instruments (London: William Barley)
- Giovanni de Macque – Fourth book of madrigals for five voices (Naples: Giovanni Giacomo Carlino & Antonio Pace)
- Luca Marenzio – Ninth book of madrigals for five voices (Venice: Angelo Gardano)
- Tiburtio Massaino
  - Fourth book of motets for five voices (Venice: Ricciardo Amadino)
  - Musica super Threnos Ieremie prophete for five voices (Venice: Ricciardo Amadino), music for Holy Week
- Simone Molinaro
  - First book of madrigals for five voices (Milan: Simon Tini & Francesco Besozzi)
  - First book of Intavolatura di liuto (Venice: Ricciardo Amadino)
- Philippe de Monte – La fiammetta for seven voices (Venice: Angelo Gardano), a collection of canzoni and madrigals
- Giovanni Bernardino Nanino – Second book of madrigals for five voices (Venice: heirs of Girolamo Scotto)
- Asprilio Pacelli – Chorici psalmi et mocteta quatuor vocum, liber primus (Rome: Nicolo Mutii)
- Giovanni Pierluigi da Palestrina (posthumous publications)
  - Eighth book of masses
  - Ninth book of masses
- Tomaso Pecci – Canzonettas for three voices (Venice: Giacomo Vincenti), contains fifteen pieces by Pecci and fifteen by Mariano Tantucci
- Hieronymus Praetorius – Cantiones sacrae de praecipuis festis totius anni for five, six, seven, and eight voices (Hamburg: Philip von Ohr)
- Enrico Antonio Radesca – Thesoro amoroso, first book of canzonettas for three and four voices (Milan: Simon Tini & Francesco Besozzi)

== Sacred music ==
- Philipp Nicolai
  - "Wachet auf, ruft uns die Stimme"
  - "Wie schön leuchtet der Morgenstern"

== Opera ==
- None recorded

== Births ==
- March 23 – Thomas Selle, composer (died 1663)
- October 10 – Étienne Moulinié, composer (died 1676)

== Deaths ==
- January 22 – Cristofano Malvezzi, organist and composer (born 1547)
- August 22 – Luca Marenzio, Italian composer (born c.1553)
- October 16 – Jacob Regnart, Franco-Flemish composer (born c.1540)
- November 8 – Francisco Guerrero, composer (born 1528)
