= 1615 in music =

List of years in music	(table)
- … 1605; 1606; 1607; 1608; 1609; 1610; 1611; 1612; 1613; 1614; 1615; 1616; 1617; 1618; 1619; 1620; 1621; 1622; 1623; 1624; 1625 …
- Art; Archaeology; Architecture; Literature; Music; Philosophy; Science; +...

== Events ==
- April – After a few months' employment at the court of the Duke of Mantua, Ferdinando I Gonzaga, Girolamo Frescobaldi returns to Rome.

== Publications ==
- Agostino Agazzari – Sacrae cantiones for one, two, and four voices, Op. 18 (Venice: Ricciardo Amadino)
- John Amner – Sacred hymnes of 3. 4. 5. and 6. parts for voyces and vyols (London: Edwin Allde)
- Severo Bonini
  - Affetti spirituali for two voices, Op. 7 (Venice: Bartolomeo Magni for Gardano)
  - Serena celeste, motets for one, two, and three voices, Op. 8 (Venice: Bartolomeo Magni for Gardano)
- Bernardino Borlasca – Cantica divae Mariae Virginis (Magnificat) for eight voices and various instruments, Op. 5 (Venice: Giacomo Vincenti)
- Joachim a Burck – Schöne Geistliche Lieder über alle Evangelia auff jede Fest unnd Sontage durchs gantze Jahr (Erfurt: Martin Wittel for Hieronymous Reinhard), texts by Ludwig Helmbold, published posthumously
- Antonio Cifra
  - Eighth book of motets for two, three, and four voices, Op. 17 (Rome: Giovanni Battista Robletti)
  - Fourth book of Li diversi scherzi for one, two, three, and four voices, Op. 20 (Rome: Giovanni Battista Robletti)
  - Third book of madrigals for five voices (Venice: Giacomo Vincenti)
- Camillo Cortellini – Letanie della B. Vergine for five, six, seven, and eight voices (Venice: Giacomo Vincenti)
- Christoph Demantius
  - Neuer deutsche lieder (New German Songs) for five voices, part 2 (Leipzig: Valentin am Ende's Erben for Thomas Schüler)
  - Tympanum militare for five, six, eight, and ten voices or instruments (Nuremberg: Balthasar Scherff for David Kauffmann)
- Thomas Elsbeth – Festorum paschalis et pentecostes officium for five voices (Liegnitz: Nikolaus Sartorius), music for Easter and Pentecost, including introits, masses, and sequences
- Melchior Franck
  - Threnodiae Davidicae for six voices (Nuremberg: Georg Leopol Fuhrmann), a setting of the penitential psalms
  - Fasciculus Quodlibeticus for four, five, and six voices (Nuremberg: David Kauffmann), a collection of quodlibets
  - Newes Hochzeit Gesang ausz dem ersten und dritten Capitel deß Ersten Buchs Moisis for five voices (Coburg: Justus Hauck), a wedding motet
  - Newes Hochzeit Gesang auß dem 19. Capitel Matthæi for six voices (Coburg: Justus Hauck), a wedding motet
  - Das Erste Evangelium unsern Ersten Eltern im Paradiß geschehen for four voices (Coburg: Justus Hauck), a birthday motet
  - Trostgesänglein ausz dem Fünfften Capittel Jobs for four voices (Coburg: Justus Hauck), a funeral motet
- Girolamo Frescobaldi – Primo libro di toccate and Libro di recercari et canzoni
- Giovanni Gabrieli
  - Symphoniae Sacrae, Book 2, for six to nineteen voices and instruments (Venice: Bartolomeo Magno for Gardano), published posthumously
  - Canzoni et sonate for three to twenty-two instruments with organ bass (Venice: Bartolomeo Magno for Gardano), published posthumously
- Marco da Gagliano – Musiche for one, two, and three voices (Venice: Ricciardo Amadino)
- Andreas Hakenberger – Sacri modulorum concentus for eight voices and instruments (Stettin: Johann Duber)
- Hans Leo Hassler – Venusgarten for four, five, and six voices (Nuremberg: Paul Kauffmann), a collection of instrumental music, published posthumously. Most of the pieces are by Valentin Haussmann.
- Sigismondo d'India
  - Third book of madrigals for five voices with basso continuo (Venice: Bartolomeo Magni for Gardano)
  - Le musiche a due voci (Music for Two Voices) (Venice: Ricciardo Amadino)
- Giovanni Girolamo Kapsberger
  - First book of sinfonie for four with basso continuo (Rome: Giovanni Battista Robletti)
  - First book of balli, gagliarde, & correnti for four voices (Rome: Giovanni Battista Robletti)
- Elias Mertel – Hortus musicalis novus (New Musical Garden) (Strasbourg: Anton Bertram), a collection of lute music
- Pietro Pace
  - The fifth book of motets..., Op. 10 (Venice: Giacomo Vincenti)
  - Il primo libro de scherzi et arie spirituali..., Op. 12 (Venice: Giacomo Vincenti)
- Francesco Pasquali – Madrigals for five voices (Venice: Giacomo Vincenti)
- Enrico Antonio Radesca – First book of madrigals for five voices (Venice: Giacomo Vincenti)

== Classical music ==
- Sethus Calvisius – Schwanengesang (Swan song) a setting of Psalm 90 verse 10, performed for the first time at his funeral, November 27
- Alessandro Grandi – Plorabo die ac nocte, a motet for four voices

== Opera ==
- Francesca Caccini – Il ballo delle zigane (lost)
- Claudio Monteverdi – Second edition of L'Orfeo

== Births ==
- September 16 – Heinrich Bach, German organist (died 1692)
- date unknown
  - Giovanni Faustini, librettist and opera impresario (died 1651)
  - Christopher Gibbons, organist and composer (died 1676)
- probable – Francesca Campana, singer, spinet player and composer (died 1665)

== Deaths ==
- June 15 – Innocentio Alberti, Italian cornet player and composer (born c. 1535)
- August 7 – Melchior Vulpius, German composer, primarily of sacred music (born c.1570)
- November 24 – Sethus Calvisius, music theorist, composer and astronomer (born 1556)
