= 1596 in music =

== Events ==
- John Bull is chosen as the first professor of music at Gresham College on the recommendation of Elizabeth I

== Publications ==
- Agostino Agazzari – First book of madrigals for six voices (Venice: Angelo Gardano)
- Felice Anerio – First book of Sacri hymni et cantica (Venice: Giacomo Vincenti)
- Ippolito Baccusi
  - Sacrae cantiones psalmi videlicet, et omnia quae ad completorium pertinent for five voices (Venice: Ricciardo Amadino)
  - Missae tres tum viva voce tum omni instrumentorum genere cantatu commodissimae (3 Masses fit for both living voices and instruments of all types) for eight voices (Venice: Ricciardo Amadino)
- Adriano Banchieri – Second book of Canzoni alla francese for four voices (Venice: Ricciardo Amadino)
- Girolamo Belli – First book of canzonettas for four voices (Ferrara: Vittorio Baldini)
- Giulio Belli – Psalmi ad vesperas in totius anni solemnitatibus for eight voices (Venice: Angelo Gardano), a collection of Psalms for Vespers, also includes two Magnificats
- Aurelio Bonelli – First book of villanelle for three voices (Venice: Angelo Gardano)
- Giovanni Croce
  - Masses for eight voices (Venice: Giacomo Vincenti)
  - First book of masses for five voices (Venice: Giacomo Vincenti)
  - Salmi che si cantano a Terza, con l'inno Te Deum, & i salmi Benedictus e Miserere for eight voices (Venice: Giacomo Vincenti), containing psalms for Terce
  - Li sette sonetti penitenziali (The seven penitential sonnets) for six voices (Venice: Giacomo Vincenti), settings of the seven penitential psalms in sonnet form, translated by Giovanni Francesco Bembo
- Christoph Demantius – Joel, chapter 2 verse 12 for five voices (Nuremberg: Paul Kauffman)
- Scipione Dentice – Second book of madrigals for five voices (Venice: Angelo Gardano)
- Johannes Eccard
  - XX. Odae sacrae: Ludovici Helmboldi (Twenty sacred odes by Ludwig Helmbold) (Mühlhausen: Hieronymous Reinhard)
  - Epithalamium (Wer Gottes Wort mit Fleis betracht) for six voices (Königsberg: Georg Osterberger), a wedding song
  - Harmonia musica (Cui virtutis amans) for eight voices (Königsberg: Georg Osterberger), a wedding song
  - Hochzeit Lied (Wo fern ein Eh gerathen soll) for five voices (Königsberg: Georg Osterberger), a wedding song
  - Harmonia (Casta Leonhardo ...) for six voices (Königsberg: Georg Osterberger), a wedding song
- Stefano Felis – Fourth book of motets for five, six, and eight voices (Venice: Giacomo Vincenti)
- Andrea Gabrieli – Third book of ricercari (Venice: Angelo Gardano), published posthumously
- Jacobus Gallus – Moralia for five, six, and eight voices (Nuremberg: Alexander Philipp Dieterich), published posthumously
- Bartholomäus Gesius – Novae melodiae harmonicis for five voices (Frankfurt an der Oder: Friedrich Hartmann)
- Carlo Gesualdo – Fourth book of madrigals for five voices (Ferrara: Vittorio Baldini)
- Hans Leo Hassler
  - Neüe teüsche Gesäng nach Art der welschen Madrigalien und Canzonetten for four, five, six, and eight voices (Augsburg: Valentin Schönigk)
  - Madrigals for five, six, seven, and eight voices (Augsburg: Valentin Schönigk)
- Luzzasco Luzzaschi – Sixth book of madrigals for five voices (Ferrara: Vittorio Baldini)
- Giovanni de Macque – First book of motets for five, six, and eight voices (Rome: Nicolo Mutii)
- Tiburtio Massaino – Second book of motets for six voices (Venice: Ricciardo Amadino)
- Johannes Matelart – Responsoria, antiphoniae et hymni for four and five voices (Rome: Nicolo Mutii)
- Philippe de Monte – First book of motets for four voices (Venice: Angelo Gardano)
- Peter Philips – First book of madrigals for six voices (Antwerp: Pierre Phalèse)
- Orfeo Vecchi – Psalmi integri in totius anni solemnitatibus (Complete psalms for all the solemnities of the year) (Milan: heirs of Francesco and Simon Tini)

== Classical music ==
- Piero Strozzi – La mascherata degli accecati

== Births ==
- September 3 – Nicola Amati, Cremonese luthier (died 1684)
- September 4 – Constantijn Huygens, Dutch composer and poet (died 1687)

== Deaths ==
- February 29 – Philippe Rogier, composer (born 1561)
- May 6 – Giaches de Wert, Flemish composer (born 1535)
- December 27 – Pietro Pontio, composer (born 1532)
