= 1597 in music =

== Events ==
- Lutenist and composer Robert Jones graduates from St Edmund Hall, Oxford.

== Publications ==
- Gregor Aichinger – Third book of motets (Nuremberg: Paul Kauffmann)
- Giammateo Asola – Vespertina omnium solemnitatum psalmodia for two choirs (Venice: Ricciardo Amadino)
- Ippolito Baccusi – Psalmi omnes qui a S. Romana Ecclesia in solemnitatibus ad vesperas decantari solent..., for eight voices (Venice: Ricciardo Amadino), also includes two Magnificats
- Adriano Banchieri
  - Hora prima di recreazione, first book of canzonettas for three voices (Venice: Ricciardo Amadino)
  - First book of madrigals for four voices (Venice)
- Joachim a Burck – Die Historia des Leidens Jesu Christi auss dem Evangelisten S. Luca (The Story of the Passion of Jesus Christ by the Evangelist St. Luke) for five voices (Mühlhausen: Hieronymous Reinhard)
- Sethus Calvisius – Harmonia cantionum ecclesiasticarum for four voices (Leipzig: Jacob Apel), a collection of Lutheran hymns
- Giovanni Croce
  - Vespertina omnium solemnitatum psalmodia for eight voices (Venice: Giacomo Vincenti), contains psalms for Vespers
  - First book of motets for four voices (Venice: Giacomo Vincenti)
- Girolamo Dalla Casa – First book of motets for six voices (Venice: Ricciardo Amadino)
- John Dowland – The First Booke of Songes or Ayres of Foure Partes with tableture for the lute (London: Peter Short)
- Johannes Eccard
  - Geistlicher Lieder auff den Choral oder gemeine Kirchen Melodey for five voices, in two volumes (Königsberg: Georg Osterberger)
  - Echo for eight voices (Königsberg, Georg Osterberger), a wedding song
  - Epithalamion (Ein Sprichwort ist) for six voices (Königsberg, Georg Osterberger), a wedding song
- Giovanni Gabrieli – Sacrae Symphoniae, Book 1, for six to sixteen voices and instruments (Venice: Angelo Gardano)
- Jacobus Gallus – Sacrae cantiones de praecipuis festis per totum annum for four, five, six, eight, and more voices (Nuremberg: Alexander Philipp Dieterich), a collection of motets, published posthumously
- Bartholomäus Gesius
  - Hymni scholastici for four voices (Frankfurt an der Oder: Andreas Eichorn)
  - Echo (Qualia jam resonet) for ten voices (Frankfurt an der Oder: Andreas Eichorn), a graduation motet
- Anthony Holborne – Cittarn Schoole (London: Peter Short), a collection of songs for the cittern
- George Kirbye – The first set Of English Madrigalls, to 4. 5. & 6. voyces (London: Thomas Este)
- Giovanni de Macque – Third book of madrigals for five voices (Ferrara: Vittorio Baldini)
- Simone Molinaro – First book of motets for five voices and masses for ten voices (Venice: Giacomo Vincenti)
- Thomas Morley
  - A Plaine and Easie Introduction to Practicall Musicke
  - Canzonets, or little short aers to five and sixe voices (London: Peter Short)
- Pietro Pace – Madrigali a cinque voci con uno a sei & un dialogo a sette (Venice: Ricciardo Amadino)
- Asprilio Pacelli – First book of motets and psalms to eight voices (Rome: Nicolo Mutii)
- Orfeo Vecchi
  - First book of masses for four voices (Milan: Francesco & the heirs of Simon Tini)
  - First book of motets for five voices (Milan: the heirs of Francesco and Simon Tini)
- Orazio Vecchi
  - Canzonette a3
  - L'Amfiparnasso, a madrigal comedy

== Opera ==
- Jacopo Peri – Dafne, the earliest known opera

== Births ==
- July 22 – Virgilio Mazzocchi, Italian composer of oratorios (died 1646)
- date unknown
  - Andreas Düben, organist and composer (died 1662)
  - Luigi Rossi, Italian composer of cantatas (died 1653)

== Deaths ==
- January 29 – Elias Ammerbach, organist (b. c.1530)
- June 6 – William Hunnis, poet, dramatist, and composer
- September 15 – Friedrich Lindner, composer, music editor, singer, and music copyist (b. c.1542)
- October 7 – Francesco Rovigo, organist and composer (b. c.1540)
