= 1595 in music =

== Events ==
- March 6 – Estacio de la Serna resigns from his post as organist at the collegiate church of San Salvador in Seville, in order to accept the position of organist of the royal chapel at Lisbon, starting on 1 April 1595.
- April 28 – Sebastian Raval is appointed maestro di cappella at the viceregal chapel in Palermo.
- Asprilio Pacelli is appointed maestro di capella at the Collegio Germanico

== Publications ==
- Gregor Aichinger – Second book of motets (Venice: Angelo Gardano)
- Giammateo Asola – Officium maioris hebdomadae... (Venice: Ricciardo Amadino)
- Johann Avianus – Delphica & vera pennae literatae nobilitas for four voices (Erfurt: G. Baumann)
- Adriano Banchieri – Concerti ecclesiastici for eight voices (Venice: Giacomo Vincenti)
- Paolo Bellasio – Fifth book of madrigals for five voices (Verona: Francesco Dalle Donne), published posthumously
- Giulio Belli – First book of masses and sacrae cantiones (motets) for eight voices (Venice: Ricciardo Amadino)
- Joachim a Burck – XV Psalmi Graduum for four voices (Erfurt: Georg Baumann), includes settings of texts by Cyriakus Schneegass
- Giovanni Antonio Cirullo – Il primo libro de madrigali, for five voices (Venice)
- Camillo Cortellini – Psalms for six voices (Venice: Giacomo Vincenti)
- Giovanni Croce
  - Second book of motets for eight voices (Venice: Giacomo Vincenti)
  - Triaca musicale (Musical antidote) for four, five, six, and seven voices (Venice: Giacomo Vincenti), a collection of capriccios
- Christoph Demantius
  - Neue Teutsche Weltliche Lieder (New German Secular Songs) in five parts for voices and instruments (Nuremberg: Paul Kauffmann for Andreas Wolken)
  - Epithalamion for five voices (Leipzig: Zacharias Berwald), for the wedding of Johann Byers and Sabinae
  - Melos eyphemetikon for six voices (Görlitz: Ambrosius Fritsch), for the wedding of Nicolai Fritsch
- Johannes Eccard
  - Epithalamium (Quod Domino solet esse suo) for five voices (Königsberg: Georg Osterberger), a wedding song
  - Epithalamium (Interpres utriusque) (Königsberg: Georg Osterberger), a wedding song
- Albinus Fabritius – Cantiones sacrae for six voices (Graz)
- Arnoldus Flandrus – Sacrae cantiones ... liber primus, for four voices, (Venice)
- Paolo Fonghetto – Lamentationes in hebdomada maiori decantandae, missaque triplici modo concinenda, for three voices (Verona)
- Alfonso Fontanelli – First book of madrigals for five voices (Ferrara: Vittorio Baldini), published anonymously
- Andrea Gabrieli – Ricercari, libro secondo (Venice: Angelo Gardano), the second book of his organ music, published posthumously
- Bartholomäus Gesius
  - Hymns for five voices (Wittenberg: Johann Hartmann)
  - Hochzeit gesänge for five, six, and eight voices (Frankfurt an der Oder: Andreas Eichorn), wedding motets for Friedrich Hartmann, his printer
- Carlo Gesualdo – Third book of madrigals for five voices (Ferrara: Vittorio Baldini)
- Adam Gumpelzhaimer – Contrapunctus for four and five voices (Augsburg: Valentin Schönigk)
- Orlande de Lassus – Lagrime di San Pietro (Munich: Adam Berg), a spiritual madrigal cycle setting the poetry of Luigi Tansillo, published posthumously
- Luzzasco Luzzaschi – Fifth book of madrigals for five voices (Ferrara: Vittorio Baldini)
- Luca Marenzio
  - Sixth book of madrigals for six voices (Venice: Angelo Gardano)
  - Seventh book of madrigals for five voices (Venice: Angelo Gardano)
- Tiburtio Massaino – First book of masses for six voices (Venice: Ricciardo Amadino)
- Rinaldo del Mel
  - Fifth book of motets, for six, eight, and twelve voices (Venice: Angelo Gardano)
  - Third book of madrigals for six voices (Venice: Angelo Gardano)
- Simone Molinaro – First book of canzonettas for three and four voices (Venice: Angelo Gardano)
- Philippe de Monte – Seventeenth book of madrigals for five voices (Venice: Angelo Gardano)
- Thomas Morley
  - The First Booke of Balletts To Five Voyces (including "Now Is the Month of Maying") (London: Thomas Este)
  - The first booke of canzonets to two voyces (London: Thomas Este)
- Giovanni Maria Patarini – Psalms for four voices (Venice: Angelo Gardano)
- Sebastian Raval – Madrigals for 3, 5, & 8 voices
- Francesco Stivori – Sacrae cantiones for four equal voices (Verona)
- Friedrich Weissensee – Evangelische Sprüche auß den Evangelien der vornemsten und feyerlichen Fest-Tagen . . . Der erste Theil (Erfurt)
- Liberale Zanchi – Il primo libro de madrigali, for five voices (Venice)

== Births ==
- January 13? – Giacinto Merulo, composer and organist (died 1650)
- January 26 – Antonio Maria Abbatini, composer (died c.1679)
- April 5 – John Wilson, composer (died 1674)
- December 2 – Henry Lawes, musician and composer (died 1662)
- probable – Giovanni Battista Buonamente, Italian violinist and composer (died 1642)
- probable – Francisca Duarte, Portuguese singer (died 1640)

== Deaths ==
- April – Annibale Stabile, composer (born c.1535)
- July 23 – Thoinot Arbeau, cleric best known for his Orchésographie, a study of late sixteenth-century French Renaissance social dance (born 1519)
- Unknown date
  - Giovanni Rossi, Italian music publisher (year of birth unknown)
