= 1600 in music =

The year 1600 in music involved some significant events.

== Events ==
- Start of the Artusi–Monteverdi controversy, marked by the publication of Artusi's treatise, L'Artusi, ovvero delle imperfettioni della moderna musica.

== Publications ==
- Agostino Agazzari – First book of madrigals for five voices (Venice: Angelo Gardano)
- Giovanni Francesco Anerio – Dialogo pastorale al presepio di nostro signore (Rome: Simone Verovio)
- Giammateo Asola
  - Divinae Dei laudes for two voices (Venice: Ricciardo Amadino)
  - Sacro sanctae dei laudes for eight voices (Venice: Ricciardo Amadino)
- Adriano Banchieri – Il studio dilettevole (Milan: Giovanni Francesco Besozzi & Co.), the third book of canzonettas for three voices
- Giulio Belli – First book of Sacrae cantiones for four, five, six, eight, and twelve voices (Venice: Angelo Gardano)
- Valerio Bona – Psalmi omnes ad vesperas per totum annum (Psalms for all Vespers for the whole year) (Venice: Giacomo Vincenti)
- Giulio Caccini – Euridice (Florence: Giorgio Marescotti), not premiered until 1602
- Christoph Demantius – Tympanum militare for six voices (Nuremberg: Catharina Dieterich)
- John Dowland – The Second Booke of Songs or Ayres of 2, 4. and 5. parts, including Flow my Tears (London: Thomas East for Thomas Morley)
- Giovanni Dragoni – First book of motets for five voices (Rome: Nicolo Mutii), published posthumously
- Johannes Eccard
  - Epithalamion (Wo Christus wird geladen) for five voices (Königsberg: Georg Osterberger), a wedding song
  - Hochzeits Lied (Nechst Gott auff dieser Erden) for five voices (Königsberg: Georg Osterberger), a wedding song
- Thomas Elsbeth – Selectissimae & novae cantiones sacrae for six voices (Frankfurt an der Oder: Friedrich Hartmann)
- Christian Erbach – Mode sacri sive cantus musici, Liber Primus for four, five, six, seven, eight, and more voices (Augsburg: Johannes Praetorius)
- Bartholomäus Gesius – Psalmodia choralis (Frankfurt an der Oder: Friedrich Hartmann), a collection of antiphons, responsories, hymns, introits and other mass music
- Jakob Hassler – Madrigals for six voices (Nuremberg: Paul Kaffmann)
- Orlande de Lassus – Prophetiae Sibyllarum for four voices (Munich: Nicolaus Heinrich), published posthumously
- Tiburtio Massaino – First book of masses for eight voices (Venice: Ricciardo Amadino)
- Simone Molinaro – Second book of canzonettas for three voices (Venice: Ricciardo Amadino)
- Philippe de Monte
  - Seventh book of motets for five voices (Venice: Angelo Gardano)
  - Musica sopra Il pastor fido for six voices (Venice: Angelo Gardano), a collection of canzoni and madrigals
- Thomas Morley – The first booke of ayres (London: William Barley)
- Giovanni Pierluigi da Palestrina (posthumous publications)
  - Tenth book of masses
  - Eleventh book of masses
  - Litaniae deiparae Virginis...
- Benedetto Pallavicino — Sixth book of madrigals for five voices (Venice: Angelo Gardano)
- Orfeo Vecchi
  - Hymni totius anni (Hymns for the whole year) for five voices (Milan: heirs of Simon Tini & Giovanni Francesco Besozzi)
  - Falsi bordoni figurati sopra gli otto toni ecclesiastici for four, five, and eight voices (Milan: heirs of Simon Tini & Giovanni Francesco Besozzi), a collection of canticles, hymns, and litanies
- Thomas Weelkes – Madrigals Of 5. and 6. parts, apt for the Viols and voices

== Classical music ==
- Emilio de' Cavalieri – Rappresentatione di Anima, et di Corpo, the first oratorio (produced in Rome in February)

== Opera ==
- Giulio Caccini – Il Rapimento di Cefalo, premièred October 8
- Jacopo Peri – Euridice (believed to be the earliest work of modern opera surviving to the present day), produced by Emilio de' Cavalieri for the wedding of Henry IV of France and Maria de' Medici in Florence, premièred October 6

== Births ==
- date unknown
  - Carlo Farina, Italian violinist and composer (died 1639)
  - Pietro Paolo Sabbatini, composer and conductor (died 1657)
  - probable – Etienne Moulinié, French composer (died 1669)

== Deaths ==
- April – Thomas Deloney, balladeer (b. 1543)
- September – Claude Le Jeune, French composer
- November 25 – Ginés Pérez de la Parra, composer (b. c. 1548)
