= 1616 in music =

== Events ==
- Johann Hermann Schein becomes cantor of Thomasschule zu Leipzig
- Manuel Correia joins his father as a singer in the ducal capela at Vila Viçosa, Portugal.
- Librettist Andrea Salvadori becomes court poet to the Medici family.

== Musical groups formed ==
- A collegium musicum is founded in Prague.

== Publications ==
- Gregor Aichinger – Triplex liturgiarum fasciculus e tribus ac diversis optimorum musicorum modulis concinnatus... (Augsburg: Johannes Praetorius)
- Bartolomeo Barbarino – Canzonettas for one and two voices, with some for solo voice, either soprano or tenor, with theorbo or other instruments (Venice: Ricciardo Amadino)
- Valerio Bona – Lamentations for Holy Week with the Benedictus and Miserere for each day, for two choirs with continuo, Op. 22 (Venice: Giacomo Vincenti)
- Bernardino Borlasca – Scala Iacob (Jacob's Ladder) for eight voices and various instruments, Op. 6 (Venice: Giacomo Vincenti), a collection of sacred songs for all solemnities of the year
- Antonio Brunelli – Third book of Scherzi, arie, canzonette, e madrigali for one, two, and three voices, Op. 12 (Venice: Giacomo Vincenti)
- Sethus Calvisius – Schwanengesang (Swan song) for eight voices (Leipzig: Lorenz Kober), a setting of Psalm 90 verse 10, published posthumously
- Antonio Cifra – First book of Scherzi sacri for one, two, three, and four voices, Op. 22 (Rome: Giovanni Battista Robletti)
- Ignazio Donati – Motetti a cinque voci in concerto (Venice: Giacomo Vincenti)
- Melchior Franck
  - Geistlichen Musicalischen Lustgartens Erster Theil for four, five, six, seven, eight, and nine voices or instruments (Nuremberg: Georg Leopold Fuhrmann), a collection of motets
  - Newes Hochzeit Gesang ausz dem ersten Capitel deß Hohenlieds Salomonis for five voices (Coburg: Justus Hauck), a wedding motet
  - Musicalische Glückwünschung for six voices (Coburg: Justus Hauck), a wedding motet
  - Zwey Newe Hochzeit Gesäng for six voices (Coburg: Justus Hauck), a wedding motet
  - Newes Hochzeit Gesang ausz dem 26. Capitel Sirachs for six voices (Coburg: Justus Hauck), a wedding motet
  - Tricinium Novum (Wie ein Kauffmann das Himmelreich) (Coburg: Justus Hauck)
  - Lilia Musicalia for four voices (Nuremberg: Georg Leopold Fuhrmann), a collection of secular songs and dances
- Joachim van den Hove – Praeludia testudinis for two voices or violins (Leiden: Godefridus Basson)
- Sigismondo d'India
  - Fourth book of madrigals for five voices (Venice: Ricciardo Amadino)
  - Fifth book of madrigals for five voices (Venice: Ricciardo Amadino)
- Scipione Lacorcia – Second book of madrigals for five voices (Naples: Giovanni Giacomo Carlino)
- Luca Marenzio – Motets for five, six, and seven voices with organ bass (Venice: Ricciardo Amadino), published posthumously
- Simone Molinaro – Passio domini nostri Iesu Christi secundum Matthaeum, Marcum, Lucam, et Ioannem (Loano: Francesco Castello)
- Pietro Pace – Scherzi, arie, et madrigali a 1–4 v..., Op. 13 (Venice: Giacomo Vincenti)
- Giuseppe Palazzotto e Tagliavia – First book of motets (Palermo: Giovanni Battista Maringo)
- Claudio Pari – Third book of madrigals for five voices (Palermo: Giovanni Battista Maringo)
- Peter Philips
  - Deliciae sacrae (Sacred Delights) for two and three voices with organ bass (Antwerp: Pierre Phalèse)
  - Les Rossignols spirituels (The Spiritual Nightengales), a collection of sacred songs for two voices with organ bass (Valenciennes: Jean Vervliet)
- Hieronymus Praetorius – Liber Missarum (Hamburg: Henrico Carstens)
- Nicolas Vallet – Le Secret des Muses, book 2

== Classical music ==
- Girolamo Frescobaldi – Peccavi super numerum, motet for 3 voices and basso continuo
- Claudio Monteverdi – Tirsi e Clori (ballet)

== Opera ==
- Domenico Belli's' Orfeo dolente
- Claudio Monteverdi – Le nozze di Tetide (lost)

== Births ==
- February 28 – Kaspar Förster, opera composer (d. 1673)
- May 18 – Johann Jakob Froberger, composer and organist (died 1667)
- September – Jacques de Saint-Luc, lutenist and composer (died c.1710)
- date unknown – Matthias Weckman, German composer (died 1674)
- probable – Maurizio Cazzati, Italian composer (died 1678)

== Deaths ==
- June 6 – Cornelis Schuyt, organist and composer (born 1557)
- unknown date – Johann Steffens, German organist and composer (born c.1560)
- probable
  - Krzysztof Klabon, composer, lutenist, and singer (born c.1550)
  - Giuliano Paratico, singer and chitarrone player (born c.1550)
