= 1606 in music =

The year 1606 in music involved some significant events.

== Events ==
- January 5 – The nuptial masque Hymenaei, with music by Alfonso Ferrabosco the younger, is performed in London.

== Publications ==
- Agostino Agazzari
  - Sacrae cantiones... liber quartus (Rome: Aloysio Zannetti)
  - Second book of madrigals for five voices (Venice: Ricciardo Amadino)
- Gregor Aichinger
  - Mass for the solemnity of Corpus Christi (Augsburg: Johannes Praetorius)
  - Vulnera Christi for three and four voices (Dillingen: Adam Metzler)
  - Fasciculus sacrarum harmoniarum quatuor vocum (Dillingen: Adam Metzler)
- Richard Allison – An howres recreation in Musicke, apt for instruments and voyces (London: John Windet)
- Felice Anerio – Responsoria (Rome: Aloysio Zannetti)
- Bartolomeo Barbarino – Madrigali di diversi autori for solo voice with theorbo, harpsichord, or other instruments (Venice: Ricciardo Amadino), also includes a song for two tenors
- John Bartlet – A Booke of Ayres with a Triplicitie of Musicke (London: John Windet), a collection of lute songs for 1, 2, & 4 voices
- Sethus Calvisius – Herr Gott wer kan aussgründen for four voices (Leipzig: Abraham Lamberg), a motet
- Giovanni Paolo Cima – Partito de ricercari, & canzoni alla francese (Milan: Simon Tini & Filippo Lomazzo)
- Camillo Cortellini – Psalms for eight voices (Venice: Giacomo Vincenti)
- Christian Erbach – Modorum sacrorum tripertitorum, quibus solennium sacrorum per annum initia for five voices, parts 2 & 3 (Dillingen: Adam Meltzer), a collection of introits, alleluias, and post-communion songs
- Giacomo Finetti – Orationes vespertinae for four voices (Venice: Ricciardo Amadino), music for Vespers
- Marco da Gagliano – Fourth book of madrigals for five voices (Venice: Angelo Gardano)
- Konrad Hagius – Canticum Virginis intemeratae (ie. Magnificat) for four, five, and six voices (Dillingen: Adam Meltzer)
- Sigismondo d'India – First book of madrigals for five voices (Milan: Agostino Tradate)
- Marc'Antonio Ingegneri
  - Second book of hymns for four voices (Venice: Ricciardo Amadino), published posthumously
  - Sixth book of madrigals for five voices (Venice: Ricciardo Amadino), published posthumously
- Claude Le Jeune
  - Pseaumes en vers mesurez for two, three, four, five, six, seven, and eight voices (Paris: Pierre Ballard), published posthumously
  - Octonaires de la vanité et inconstance du monde (Eight-line poems on the vanity and inconstancy of the world) for three and four voices (Paris: Pierre Ballard), published posthumously
- Tiburtio Massaino – Sacri modulorum concentus for eight, nine, ten, twelve, fifteen, and sixteen voices, Op. 31 (Venice: Angelo Gardano)
- Ascanio Mayone – First book of ricercars for three voices (Naples: Giovanni Battista Sottile)
- Claudio Merulo – Second book of canzoni d'intavolatura d'organo (Venice: Angelo Gardano & fratelli), published posthumously
- Girolamo Montesardo – Nuova inventione d'intavolatura per sonare li balletti sopra la chitarra spanuola, published in Florence, the first printed source of alfabeto notation for the guitar
- Nicola Parma – Motets for eight and twelve voices (Venice: Ricciardo Amadino)
- Serafino Patta - Missa, psalmi, motecta ac litaniae in honorem Deiparae Virginis... (Venice: Giacomo Vincenti)
- Enrico Antonio Radesca (Radesca di Foggia) – Second book of canzonettas, madrigals and arie della romana for two voices (Milan: Simon Tini & Filippo Lomazzo)

== Classical music ==
- Agostino Agazzari – Eumelio (oratorio), premiered in Rome at the Roman Seminary during Carnival, published in Venice by Ricciardo Amadino
- John Coprario – Funeral Teares for one and two voices (London: John Windet for William Barley for John Browne), written on the death of the Earl of Devonshire (April 3, 1606).

== Opera ==
- Andrea Cima – La Gentile

== Births ==
- March 13 – Giacinto Anzalone, Italian composer, conductor, and director of the Conservatorio della Pietà dei Turchini in Naples.
- date unknown
  - William Child, organist and composer (d. 1697)
  - Johannes Khuen, poet and composer (d. 1675)
  - Urbán de Vargas, composer (d. 1656)

== Deaths ==
- January 28 – Guillaume Costeley, composer (b. c.1530)
- September 9 – Leonhard Lechner, composer and music editor (born c. 1553)
- date unknown
  - Jan Trojan Turnovský, composer (born c.1550)
  - Georgius Nigrinus, music publisher
- probable – Pellegrino Micheli, violin maker (born c.1530)
