= 1614 in music =

The year 1614 in music involved some significant musical events.

== Events ==
- Hymn-writer Melchior Teschner becomes pastor at Oberpritschen.

== Publications ==
- Agostino Agazzari – 4 Masses, Op. 17 (Venice: Ricciardo Amadino)
- Giovanni Francesco Anerio
  - Responsoria Nativitatis Domini (Rome: Giovanni Battista Robletti), also includes a Venite exultemus and a Te Deum
  - Psalmi vesperarum (Rome: Giovanni Battista Robletti)
  - First book of masses (Rome: Giovanni Battista Robletti)
- Adriano Banchieri – Due ripieni in applauso musicale for eight voices (Bologna: Giovanni Rossi)
- Bartolomeo Barbarino
  - Second book of motets for solo voice, either soprano or tenor (Venice: Bartolomeo Magno for Gardano)
  - Fourth book of Madrigali di diversi autori for solo voice with theorbo, harpsichord, or other instruments (Venice: Ricciardo Amadino)
- Cesare Bendinelli – Tutta L'Arte della Trombetta, a collection of lessons for the trumpet.
- Valerio Bona – Sei canzoni italiane da sonare concertate a doi chori in echo, facilissime, & comodissime (Six Italian canzonas for concerted playing by two choirs in echo, very easily & comfortably), Op. 21 (Venice: Giacomo Vincenti)
- William Brade – Newe außerlesene Paduanen und Galliarden for six (Hamburg: Michael Hering), a collection of dance music
- Antonio Brunelli
  - Second book of Scherzi, arie, canzonette, madrigali for one, two, and three voices, Op. 10 (Venice: Giacomo Vincenti)
  - Various exercises for one or two voices, for cornetto, flute, and violins (Florence: Zanobi Pignoni)
- Giulio Caccini – Nuove musiche e nuova maniera di scriverle, con due arie particolari per tenore, che ricerchi le corde del basso (Florence: Zanobi Pignoni)
- Antonio Cifra
  - Seventh book of motets for two, three, and four voices, Op. 16 (Rome: Giovanni Battista Robletti)
  - Scherzi et arie for one, two, three, and four voices, to be sung over a harpsichord, archlute, or similar instrument (Venice: Giacomo Vincenti)
- Christoph Demantius – Neuer deutscher Lieder (New German Songs) for five voices, part 1 (Leipzig: Valentin am Ende for Thomas Schürer)
- Giacomo Finetti – Psalms for three voices with organ bass (Venice: Bartolomeo Magni for Gardano)
- Melchior Franck
  - Recreationes musicae for four and five voices (Nuremberg: Georg Leopold Fuhrmann), secular songs and dances for voices and instruments
  - Ist Gott für uns for four voices (Coburg: Fürstliche Druckerei for Justus Hauck), a funeral motet
  - Epithalamia for four voices (Coburg: Kaspar Bertsch), a wedding motet
  - Musicalische Glückwünschunge for eight voices (Coburg: Fürstliche Druckerei for Justus Hauck), a wedding motet
  - Zwey Newe Hochzeit Gesäng (Two New Wedding Songs) for four and five voices (Coburg: Fürstliche Druckerei for Justus Hauck)
- Marco da Gagliano – Masses and motets for six voices (Florence: Zanobi Pignoni)
- Adam Gumpelzhaimer – Sacrorum concentuum, book two, for eight voices and organ bass (Augsburg: Valentin Schönigk)
- Filipe de Magalhães – Cantus ecclesiasticus commendandi animas corporaque (Lisbon)
- Claudio Monteverdi – Il sesto libro de madrigali a cinque voci, con uno dialogo a sette, con il suo basso continuo per poterli concertare nel clavacembalo, et altri stromenti. Di Claudio Monteverde Maestro di Cappella della Sereniss. Sig. di Venetia in S. Marco (Sixth book of madrigals for five voices) (Venice: Ricciardo Amadino)
- Pietro Pace
  - The fourth book of madrigals..., Op. 6 (Rome: Giovanni Battista Robletti)
  - The third book of motets..., Op. 8 (Venice, Giacomo Vincenti)
  - The fourth book of motets..., Op. 9 (Venice, Giacomo Vincenti)
- Serafino Patta – Motetti et madrigali cavati de la poesie sacre... (Venice: Bartolomeo Magni for Gardano)
- Michael Praetorius – Syntagma Musicum, part 1.
- Thomas Ravenscroft – A Briefe Discourse of the True (but Neglected) Use of Charact'ring the Degrees...

== Births ==
- date unknown
  - Jean-Baptiste de Boësset, composer (died 1685)
  - Franz Tunder, German organist and composer (died 1667)

== Deaths ==
- September – Giovanni de Macque, composer (born c. 1550)
- September 26 or 27 – Felice Anerio, composer (born 1560)
