= 1592 in music =

== Events ==
- November 13 – Lodovico Bassano marries Elizabeth Damon

== Publications ==
- Costanzo Antegnati – Psalms for eight voices (Venice: Angelo Gardano)
- Giammateo Asola
  - Cantus firmus masses for organ and choir (Venice: Giacomo Vincenti)
  - Sacra, omnium solemnitatum vespertina psalmodia for five voices (Venice:Ricciardo Amadino), also includes a Magnificat
- Paolo Bellasio – Villanellas for three voices, with lute tablature (Venice: Angelo Gardano)
- Valerio Bona – Second book of canzonettas for three voices (Venice: Ricciardo Amadino)
- Giovanni Croce – Second book of madrigals for five voices (Venice: Giacomo Vincenti)
- Thomas East (ed.) – The Whole Booke of Psalmes (London: Thomas East), contains new settings by English composers, including Edward Blancks, Edmund Hooper, and John Dowland
- Angelo Gardano (publisher) – Il Trionfo di Dori (Venice), a collection of 29 madrigals by 29 composers
- Tiburtio Massaino
  - Sacri modulorum concentus for six, seven, eight, nine, ten, and twelve voices in two or three choirs with instruments (Venice: Angelo Gardano)
  - First book of motets for four voices (Prague: Georg Nigrinus)
  - First book of motets for six voices (Venice: Angelo Gardano)
- Claudio Merulo – First book of Canzoni d'intavolatura d'organo (Venice: Angelo Gardano), a collection of keyboard music
- Philippe de Monte – Fifteenth book of madrigals for five voices (Venice: Angelo Gardano)
- Claudio Monteverdi – Di Claudio Monteverde il terzo libro de madrigali a cinque voci (Third book of madrigals for five voices) (Venice: Ricciardo Amadino)
- Nicola Parma – Second book of madrigals for five and six voices (Venice: Ricciardo Amadino)
- Riccardo Rognoni – Passaggi per potersi esercitare nel diminuire terminatamente con ogni sorte d'instrumenti et anco diversi passaggi per la semplice voce humana di Richardo Rogniono espulso di Val Tavegia. Venice.

== Classical music ==
- none listed

== Births ==
- date unknown
  - John Jenkins, English composer (died 1678)
  - Domenico Mazzocchi, Italian composer (died 1665)

== Deaths ==
- February 29 – Alessandro Striggio, diplomat and composer (b. c. 1536)
- May – Giovanni Domenico da Nola, Neapolitan poet and composer (born c. 1510)
- May 24 – Nikolaus Selnecker, theologian and musician (b. 1532)
- July 1 – Marc'Antonio Ingegneri, composer (b. c. 1547)
- date unknown
  - Alessandro Romano, Italian composer, singer, and violist (b. 1533)
  - Annibale Zoilo, singer and composer (b. c. 1537)
