= 1586 in music =

== Publications ==
- Lodovico Agostini – Le lagrime del peccatore (The Tears of the Sinner), fourth book for six voices, Op. 12 (Venice: Giacomo Vincenti & Ricciardo Amadino)
- Felice Anerio – First book of canzonettas for four voices (Venice: Giacomo Vincenti & Ricciardo Amandino)
- Giammateo Asola
  - Psalms (Venice: Ricciardo Amadino), also includes a Te Deum
  - Missae octonis compositae tonis for four voices (Giacomo Vincenti & Ricciardo Amadino)
  - Officium defunctorum for four voices (Venice: Giacomo Vincenti & Ricciardo Amadino)
- Lodovico Balbi – Cappriccios for six voices (Venice: Angelo Gardano)
- Giulio Belli – First book of masses for five voices (Venice: Angelo Gardano)
- Camillo Cortellini – Third book of madrigals for five voices (Ferrara: Vittorio Baldini)
- Jacobus Gallus – Opus musicum, volume 1 (Prague: Georg Nigrinus).
- Ruggiero Giovannelli – First book of madrigals for five voices (Venice: Angelo Gardano)
- Marc'Antonio Ingegneri
  - First book of motets for four voices (Venice: Angelo Gardano)
  - First book of madrigals for six voices (Venice: Angelo Gardano)
- Simon Bar Jona Madelka – Seven Penitential Psalms for five voices (Altdorf: Nikolaus Knorr)
- Jacques Mauduit – Chansonnettes mesurées de Jan-Antoine de Baïf for four voices (Paris: Le Roy & Ballard)
- Rinaldo del Mel – Second book of madrigaletti for three voices (Venice: Angelo Gardano)
- Philippe de Monte – Eleventh book of madrigals for five voices (Venice: Angelo Gardano)
- Giovanni Maria Nanino
  - Motets for three and five voices (Venice: Angelo Gardano)
  - Third book of madrigals for five voices (Venice: Angelo Gardano)
- Lucas Osiander the Elder – Fünfftzig Geistliche Lieder und Psalmen (Fifty sacred songs and psalms) for four voices (Nuremberg: Katharina Gerlach)
- Giovanni Pierluigi da Palestrina – Second book of madrigals for four voices
- Nicola Parma – Sacrae cantiones..., book two (Venice: Giacomo Vincenti & Ricciardo Amadino)
- Costanzo Porta – Fourth book of madrigals for five voices (Venice: Angelo Gardano)
- Giaches de Wert – Eighth book of madrigals for five voices

== Compositions ==
- Anthony Holborne – The Countess of Pembroke's Funerals

== Births ==
- January 20 – Johann Hermann Schein, German composer (died 1630)
- July 1 – Claudio Saracini, lutenist, singer and composer (died 1630)

Probable

- Andrea Falconieri, composer (died 1653)

== Deaths ==
- August 27 – George de La Hèle, Franco-Flemish composer
- November – Bernardino de Figueroa, composer (born c. 1510)
