= 1610 in music =

The year 1610 in music involved some significant events.

== Events ==
- Girolamo Diruta dedicates part 2 of his treatise, Il transilvano, to Leonora Orsini Sforza. This is the last record of Diruta.

== Publications ==
- Adriano Banchieri – Vezzo di perle musicali, Op. 23 (Necklace of musical pearls) (Venice: Ricciardo Amadino), a collection of motets
- Bartolomeo Barbarino
  - Third book of Madrigali di diversi autori for solo voice with theorbo, harpsichord, or other instruments (Venice: Ricciardo Amadino), also includes some canzonettas
  - First book of motets for solo voice, either soprano or tenor (Venice: Ricciardo Amadino)
- Lodovico Bellanda – Second book of Le musiche ... per cantarsi sopra theorba, arpicordo, & altri stromenti (Music to sing with theorbo, harpsichord, and other instruments), for one and two voices (Venice: Giacomo Vincenti)
- Girolamo Belli – Psalms for five voices and continuo, Op. 20 (Venice: Ricciardo Amadino), also includes two Magnificats and Marian litanies
- Joachim a Burck
  - January 28 – Zwey Epithalamia, zu Glückwünschung zur Hochzeit (Two epithalamia as congratulations on the marriage) (Erfurt: Martin Wittel)
  - April 23 – Drey christliche Brautlieder (Three Christian bridal songs) (Jena: Johann Weidner)
- Antonio Cifra – Vespers and motets for eight voices, Op. 9 (Rome: Bartolomeo Zannetti)
- Giovanni Paolo Cima – Concerti ecclesiastici (Ecclesiastical concerti) for one, two, three and four voices with one for five and one for eight, together with a mass, two Magnificats, and six sonatas with 2 to 4 instruments and basso continuo (Milan: Simon Tini & Filippo Lomazzo)
- William Corkine – Ayres, to sing and play to the lute and basse violl (London: W. Stansby for John Browne), also includes dance music for the lyra viol
- Giovanni Croce – 9 Lamentations for Holy Week for four voices (Venice: Giacomo Vincenti), published posthumously
- Christoph Demantius – Corona harmonica for six voices or instruments (Leipzig: Abraham Lamberg), contains settings of selections from the Gospels for the whole year
- Eustache Du Caurroy
  - Meslanges de la musique (Paris: Pierre Ballard), a collection of psalm settings, published posthumously
  - Fantasies for three, four, five, and six parts (Paris: Pierre Ballard), published posthumously
- Michael East – The Third Set Of Bookes ... to 5. and 6. parts: Apt both for Viols and Voyces
- Johannes Eccard – Epithalamion in honorem nuptiarum Thomae Hoikendorphii & Elisabethae Foltelij compositum (Königsberg, Georg Osterberger), a wedding song
- Melchior Franck
  - Musikalische Fröligkeit von etlichen Neuen lustigen Deutschen Gesängen, Täntzen, Galliarden und Concerten for four, five, six, and eight voices (Coburg: Justus Hauck)
  - Flores musicales for four, five, six, and eight voices (Nuremberg: David Kauffmann)
  - Gratulationes musicae for three, four, and five voices (Coburg: Justus Hauck), a birthday song
- Bartholomäus Gesius – Cantiones sacrae chorales for four, five, and six voices (Frankfurt an der Oder: Friedrich Hartmann)
- Cesario Gussago – Psalmi ad vesperas solemnitatum totius anni (Vespers psalms for the whole year) for eight voices (Venice: Ricciardo Amadino)
- Andreas Hakenberger – Neue Deutsche Gesänge (New German Songs) for five voices (Danzig: Andreas Hünefeld), a collection of madrigals
- Sigismondo d'India
  - Novi concentus ecclesiastici for two and three voices (Venice: Angelo Gardano), a collection of sacred songs
  - Second book of sacrae concentus for three, four, five, and six voices (Venice: Angelo Gardano)
- Giovanni Girolamo Kapsberger – First book of villanelle for one, two, and three voices with accompaniment (Rome)
- Orlande de Lassus – Posthumous Masses (Munich: Nicolaus Heinrich)
- Claude Le Jeune – Third book of psalms for three voices (Paris: Pierre Ballard), published posthumously
- Giovanni de Macque – Third book of madrigals for four voices (Naples: Giovanni Battista Gargano & Lucrezio Nucci)
- Simone Molinaro – Fatiche spirituali for six voices, books 1 & 2 (Venice: Ricciardo Amadino)
- Claudio Monteverdi – Vespro della Beata Vergine (Venice: Ricciardo Amadino)
- Giovanni Bernardino Nanino – Motets for two, three, and four voices (Rome: Giovanni Battista Robletti)
- Germano Pallavicino – Il secondo libro delle fantasie, over ricercare a quattro voci... (Venice: Ricciardo Amadino)
- Enrico Antonio Radesca (Radesca di Foggia) – Fourth book of canzonettas, madrigals and arie alla romana for two and three voices (Venice: Giacomo Vincenti)

== Classical music ==
- Georg Patermann – Harmonia for ten voices, to commemorate the wedding of Peter Fueß and Wendula Linsing

== Opera ==
- Giordano Giacobbi – L'Andromeda

== Births ==
- July – Leonora Duarte, Flemish musician and composer (died 1678)
- December 9 – Baldassare Ferri, castrato singer (died 1680)
- date unknown
  - Wojciech Bobowski, Polish musician and Ottoman dragoman (died 1675)
  - Henry Du Mont, French composer (died 1684)
  - Michel Lambert, French composer of airs (died 1696)

== Deaths ==
- May 2 – Paolo Virchi, organist and composer (born 1551)
- May 24 – Joachim a Burck, composer and Lutheran hymnodist (born 1546)
