= 1594 in music =

== Events ==
- Thomas Ravenscroft joins the choir of St Paul's Cathedral, London.
- Alfonso Fontanelli and Carlo Gesualdo visit Venice, Florence, Naples, and Venosa.
- Sethus Calvisius becomes Thomaskantor in Leipzig.

== Publications ==
- Ippolito Baccusi
  - Psalmi omnes qui in vesperis a Romana Ecclesia decantantur for four voices, books 2 & 3 (Venice: Ricciardo Amadino), also includes a Magnificat
  - First book of madrigals for three voices (Venice: Ricciardo Amadino)
- Girolamo Belli – Sacrae cantiones cum B. V. cantico (Motets and a Magnificat) for ten voices (Venice: Ricciardo Amadino), also includes a mass for eight voices
- Valerio Bona – Masses and motets for three voices (Milan: Francesco & Simon Tini), also includes a Magnificat for six voices
- Sethus Calvisius – Hymni sacri latini et germanici (Sacred hymns in Latin and German) for four voices (Erfurt: Georg Baumann)
- Giovanni Croce
  - First book of motets for eight voices (Venice: Giacomo Vincenti)
  - Novi pensieri musicali (New musical thoughts) for five voices (Venice: Giacomo Vincenti)
- Christoph Demantius – Epithalamium honori nuptiarum Dn. Andreae Goldbeckii cum foemina Anna Christophori Reichij relicta vidua (Leipzig: Zacharias Berwald), a wedding song
- Scipione Dentice – First book of motets for five voices (Rome: Francesco Coattino)
- Giovanni Dragoni – Fourth book of madrigals for five voices (Venice: Giacomo Vincenti)
- Johannes Eccard
  - Epithalamion (Was Gott für hat) for five voices (Königsberg: George Osterberg), a wedding song
  - Dilexi sapientiam for five voices (Königsberg: George Osterberg), a graduation song
- Carlo Gesualdo
  - First book of madrigals for five voices (Ferrara: Vittorio Baldini)
  - Second book of madrigals for five voices (Ferrara: Vittorio Baldini)
- Adam Gumpelzhaimer – Neue Teutsche Geistliche Lieder (New German Sacred Songs) for four voices (Augsburg: Valentin Schönigk)
- Johannes Herold – Historia, deß Leidens unnd Sterbens unsers Herrn und Haylandts Jesu Christu auß dem H. Euangelisten Mattheo for six voices (Grätz: Georg Widmanstetter)
- Paolo Isnardi – Missa cum motteto for eight voices (Venice: heirs of Girolamo Scotto)
- Orlande de Lassus – Motets for six voices (Graz: Georg Widmanstetter)
- Claude Le Jeune – Airs for four and five voices (Paris: Adrian Le Roy and the widow of R. Ballard)
- Luzzasco Luzzaschi – Fourth book of madrigals for five voices (Ferrara: Vittorio Baldini)
- Luca Marenzio – Sixth book of madrigals for five voices (Venice: Angelo Gardano)
- Tiburtio Massaino – Fourth book of madrigals for five voices (Venice: Angelo Gardano)
- Rinaldo del Mel
  - Fifth book of madrigals for five voices (Venice: Angelo Gardano)
  - Third book of madrigaletti for three voices (Venice: Angelo Gardano)
- Claudio Merulo – Sacrorum concentuum, book one for eight, ten, twelve, and sixteen voices (Venice: Angelo Gardano)
- Philippe de Monte – Eighth book of madrigals for six voices (Venice: Angelo Gardano)
- Thomas Morley – Madrigalls To Foure Voyces ... The First Booke (London: Thomas Este)
- John Mundy – Songs and psalmes composed into 3. 4. and 5. parts (London: Thomas Este)
- Giovanni Pierluigi da Palestrina
  - Sixth book of masses for four and five voices (Rome: Francesco Coattino)
  - Seventh book of masses for four and five voices (Rome: Francesco Coattino)
- Andreas Raselius – Teutscher Sprüche auss den sontäglichen Evangeliis durchs gantze Jar, first Evangelienmotetten cycle covering the whole year to be written in the German language

== Classical music ==
- Orlande de Lassus – Lagrime di San Pietro

== Births ==
- February 5 – Biagio Marini, violinist and composer (d. 1663)
- September 13 – Francesco Manelli, Italian composer and theorbist (died 1667)

== Deaths ==
- February 2 – Giovanni Pierluigi da Palestrina, Italian composer (born c.1525)
- June 14 – Orlande de Lassus, Flemish composer (born 1532)
- July – Girolamo Mei, humanist and inspiration of the Florentine Camerata (b. 1519)
- July 10 – Paolo Bellasio, organist and composer (b. 1554)
