= 1593 in music =

== Events ==
- 1593–1594 – Diomedes Cato goes with King Sigismund to Sweden, where his fame as a lutenist and composer is large.
- Johann (Johannes) Christoph Demantius, German poet/composer and music theorist, receives a degree from the University of Wittenberg.
- English composer William Byrd moves to Essex.
- Peter Philips moves to Amsterdam, and probably meets Jan Pieterszoon Sweelinck in this year.

== Music published ==
- Raffaella Aleotti
  - Sacrae cantiones, book 1 (Venice: Ricciardo Amadino)
  - Ghirlanda de madrigali (Garland of madrigals) (Venice: Giacomo Vincenti)
- Blasius Amon – Breves et selectae quaedam motetae... (Munich: Adam Berg), published posthumously
- Giammateo Asola – Sacra omnium solemnitatum vespertina psalmodia for six voices (Venice:Ricciardo Amadino), also includes a Magnificat
- Ippolito Baccusi – Fourth book of masses for five and nine voices (Venice: Angelo Gardano)
- Lodovico Bellanda – First book of canzonettas for three voices (Venice: Ricciardo Amadino)
- Girolamo Belli – Third book of madrigals for six voices (Venice: Ricciardo Amadino)
- Giulio Belli
  - Second book of madrigals for five and six voices (Venice: Ricciardo Amadino)
  - Second book of canzonettas for four voices (Venice: Ricciardo Amadino)
- Fabrizio Dentice – Lamentations for five voices (Milan: Francesco & Simon Tini)
- Girolamo Diruta – Il Transilvano (Venice: Giacomo Vincenti), a treatise on organ playing, including tablatures of original pieces and pieces by various composers
- Johannes Eccard – Epithalamia (Regina Stephanoque; Frölich zu sein) (Königsberg: Georg Osterberg), wedding music
- Andrea Gabrieli & Giovanni Gabrieli – Intonationi d'organo, libro primo (Venice: Angelo Gardano), published posthumously for Andrea
- Bartholomäus Gesius – Psalm 112 for five voices (Frankfurt (Oder): Friedrich Hartmann), a wedding motet
- Ruggiero Giovannelli
  - First book of motets for five and eight voices (Rome: Francesco Coattino)
  - Second book of madrigals for five voices (Venice: Angelo Gardano)
- Rinaldo del Mel – Second book of madrigals for six voices (Venice: Giacomo Vincenti)
- Claudio Merulo – Second book of madrigals for six voices (Venice: Angelo Gardano)
- Philippe de Monte
  - Eccellenze di Maria Vergine for five voices (Venice: Angelo Gardano)
  - Sixteenth book of madrigals for five voices (Venice: Angelo Gardano)
- Thomas Morley – Canzonets. Or Little Short Songs To Three Voyces (London: Thomas Este)
- Giovanni Maria Nanino – First book of canzonettas for three voices (Venice: Angelo Gardano)
- Giovanni Pierluigi da Palestrina publishes a collection of Offertoria, his last publication.
- Benedetto Pallavicino – Fifth book of madrigals to five voices (Venice: Giacomo Vincenti)

== Music composed ==
- Franco-Flemish Renaissance master Orlande de Lassus began composing Lagrime di San Pietro (1593–1594), dedicated to Pope Clement VIII: it was the final work of Lassus and considered, by some, the absolute summit of the 16th-century Italian madrigal. It would be completed early in 1594, and published in 1595.

== Births ==
- April 3 – George Herbert, poet, orator, hymnist (d. 1633)
- September 20 – Gottfried Scheidt, organist and composer (d. 1661)
- date unknown – Claudia Rusca, composer, singer, and organist (d. 1676)

== Deaths ==
- February – Nicolao Dorati, trombone player and composer (b. 1513)
- date unknown –
  - Count Mario Bevilacqua, patron of music and collector of instruments (b. 1536)
  - Lodovico Bassano (buried 18 July), London wind player and composer
