= 1612 in music =

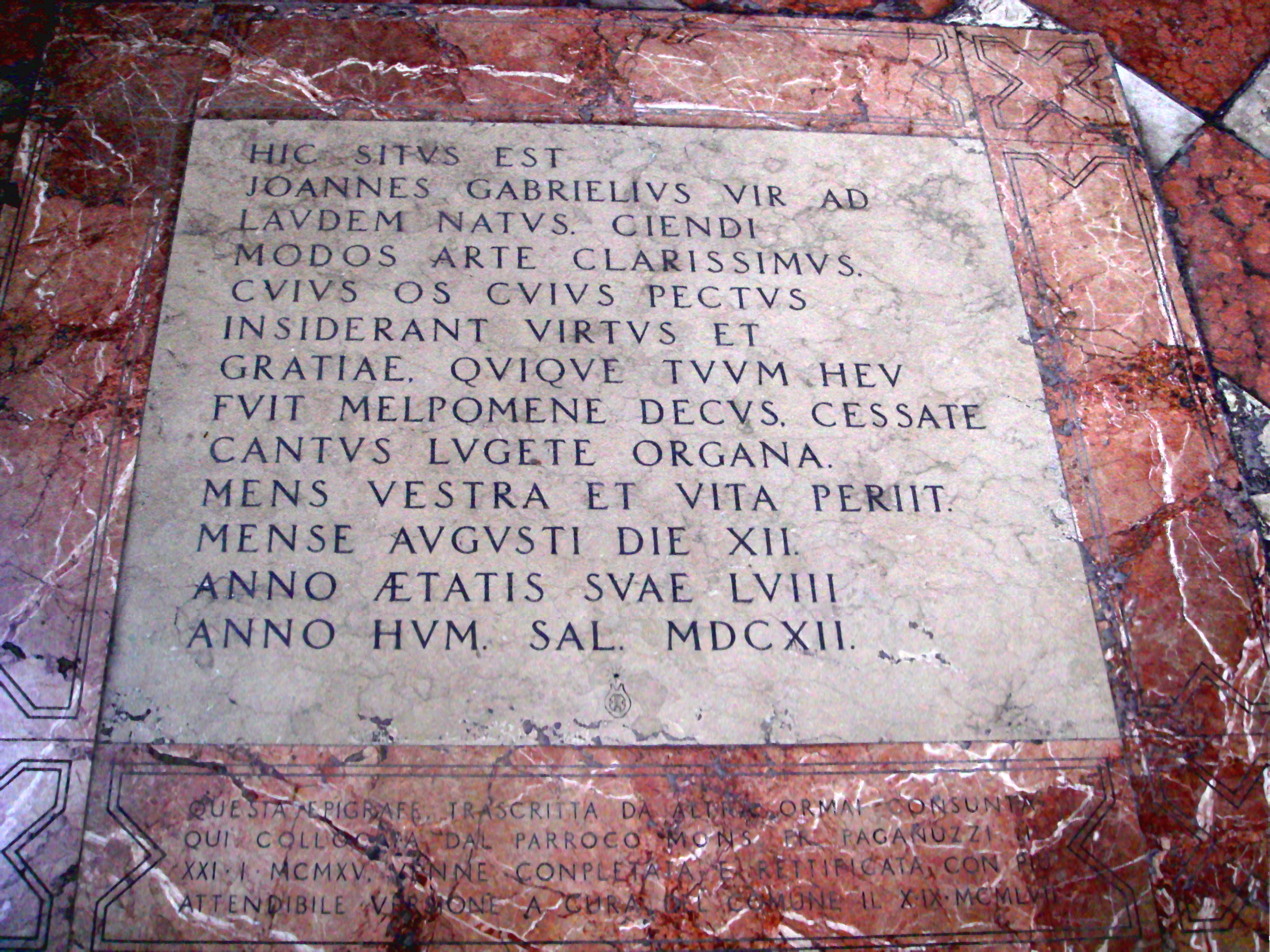
Gravestone for composer Giovanni Gabrieli, Venice, Italy.

The year 1612 in music involved some significant events.

== Events ==
- July – Claudio Monteverdi is dismissed from his post at the court of Mantua by the new duke Francesco IV Gonzaga.
- October 28 – John Dowland is appointed to a special post at the court of King James I of England.
- December – The death of Francesco Gonzaga, Duke of Mantua, fails to bring a recall to court for Claudio Monteverdi.

== Publications ==
- Adriano Banchieri – Moderna armonia di canzoni alla francese, Op. 26 (Venice: Ricciardo Amadino), a collection for four instruments
- Antonio Brunelli – Prato di sacri fiori musicali (Meadow of sacred musical flowers) for one voice and eight voices with continuo, Op. 7 (Venice: Giacomo Vincenti)
- Sethus Calvisius – Bicinia book two (Leipzig: Jacob Apel), an expanded edition of book one from 1599
- Antonio Cifra – Fifth book of motets for two, three, and four voices, Op. 11 (Rome: Giovanni Battista Robletti)
- William Corkine – The second book of ayres, some, to sing and play to the base-violl alone: others, to be sung to the lute and base violl (London: Matthew Lownes, John Brown, Thomas Snodham for William Barley), also includes pieces for the lyra viol
- Giovanni Croce – Sacre cantilene for three, five, and six voices with a four-part ripieno (Venice: Giacomo Vincenti)
- Ignazio Donati – Sacri concentus for one, two, three, four, and five voices (Venice: Giacomo Vincenti)
- John Dowland – A Pilgrimes solace for three, four, and five voices (London: Matthew Lownes, John Brown, Thomas Snodham for William Barley)
- Giacomo Finetti – Concerti for four voices with organ bass (Venice: Angelo Gardano)
- Melchior Franck
  - Ein schöner Text Auß dem Ersten Capitel Syrachs for five voices (Coburg: Justus Hauck), a wedding song
  - Suspira musica (Musical Sigh) for four voices (Coburg: Justus Hauck), a collection of motets
- Bartholomäus Gesius – Gratulatio musica in lauream doctoralem Jacobi Schickfusii for five voices (Brieg), a graduation song
- Orlando Gibbons – The First Set Of Madrigals and Motetts of 5. Parts: apt for Viols and Voyces (London: Thomas Snodham for William Barley)
- Konrad Hagius – First book of Etlicher Teutscher Geistlicher Psalmen und Gesängen for four, five, and six voices (Frankfurt: Wolfgang Richter)
- Hans Leo Hassler – Sacri concentus Book 2, published in Augsburg.
- Joachim van den Hove – Delitiae musicae (Utrecht: Salomon de Roy & Johannes Guilielmus de Rhenen), a collection of lute music
- Sigismondo d'India – Second book of Villanelle alla napolitana for three, four, and five voices (Venice: Angelo Gardano)
- Giovanni Girolamo Kapsberger
  - First book of motetti passagiatti for one voice (Rome)
  - First book of arie passagiatti for one voice with theorbo (Rome)
- Claude Le Jeune – Second livre des meslanges (Paris: Pierre Ballard), a collection of chansons, published posthumously
- Simone Molinaro – Concerti for one and two voices (Milan: Simon Tini & Francesco Lomazzo)
- Giovanni Bernardino Nanino
  - Third book of motets for one, two, three, four, and five voices with organ bass (Rome: Bartolomeo Zannetti for Christophoro Margarina)
  - Third book of madrigals for five voices (Rome: Bartolomeo Zannetti)
- Pietro Pace – Second book of madrigals for five voices (Venice, Giacomo Vincenti)
- Benedetto Pallavicino – Eighth book of madrigals for five voices (Venice: Ricciardo Amadino), published posthumously
- Tomaso Pecci - Second book of madrigals for five voices (Venice: Angelo Gardano), published posthumously
- Peter Philips – Cantiones Sacrae Quinis Vocibus (Antwerp: Pierre Phalèse)
- Michael Praetorius – Terpsichore, a set of Renaissance dances.
- probable
  - Parthenia, a collection of keyboard music by William Byrd, John Bull, and Orlando Gibbons

== Opera ==
- none recorded

== Births ==
- date unknown
  - Wolfgang Ebner, organist and court composer (died 1665)
  - John Hingston, organist, viol player and composer (died 1683)
  - Vincenzo Tozzi, opera composer (died c. 1679)

== Deaths ==
- June 8 – Hans Leo Hassler, German composer (born 1564)
- August 12 – Giovanni Gabrieli, composer and organist (born c.1555)
- September – Giovanni de' Bardi, writer and composer (born 1534)
- September 24 – Johannes Lippius, theologian, philosopher, composer, and music theorist (born 1585)
- date unknown
  - Ercole Bottrigari, writer and composer (born 1531)
  - Tomasz Szadek, Polish composer and singer (born 1550)
