= 1574 in music =

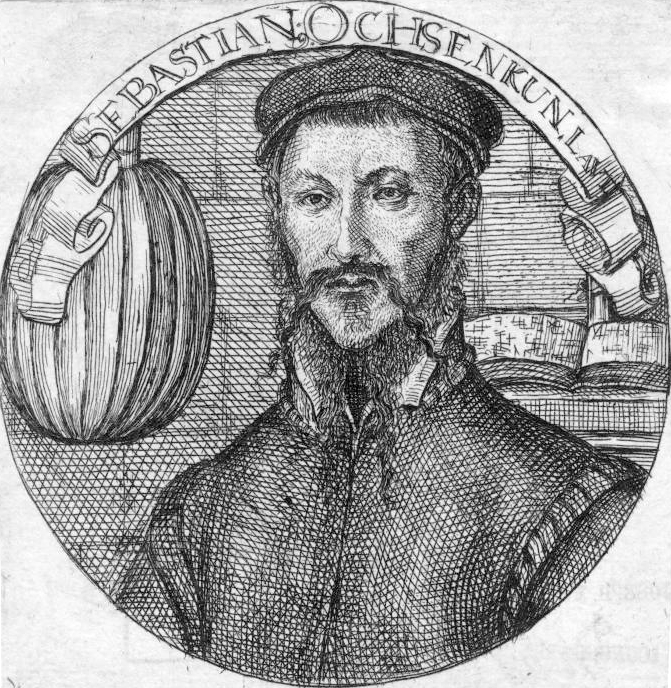

== Publications ==
- Lodovico Agostini – First book of canzoni alla napolitana for five voices (Venice: sons of Antonio Gardano)
- Giammateo Asola
  - First book of masses for four voices (Venice: sons of Antonio Gardano)
  - Psalmodia ad vespertinas omnium solemnitatum horas for eight voices (Venice: heirs of Girolamo Scotto), also contains two Magnificats
- Joachim a Burck – Passio Iesu Christi. Im 22. Psalm des Propheten Davids beschrieben for four voices (Erfurt: Georg Baumann)
- Joachim a Burck & Johannes Eccard – Odae Ludovici Helmboldi, latinae & germanicae (Odes of Ludwig Helmbold, in Latin and German) for four voices (Mühlhausen: Georg Hantzsch), a shared volume of hymn settings
- Ippolito Chamaterò – Introits for four, five, and six voices (Venice: heirs of Girolamo Scotto)
- Girolamo Dalla Casa – First book of madrigals for five and six voices (Venice: the sons of Antonio Gardano)
- Johannes Eccard – Zwentzig Neue Christliche Gesäng Ludovici Helmboldi (Twenty New Christian Songs by Ludwig Helmbold) for four voices (Mühlhausen: Georg Hantzsch)
- Andrea Gabrieli – First book of madrigals for six voices (Venice: Antonio Gardano, figliuoli)
- Vincenzo Galilei – First book of madrigals for four and five voices (Venice: Antonio Gardano, figliuoli)
- Jacobus de Kerle – Egregia cantio, in gratiam et honorem generosi ac nobilis domini, Melchioris Lincken Augustani for six voices (Nuremberg: Theodor Gerlach)
- Orlande de Lassus
  - Patrocinium musices, Part 2 (Munich: Adam Berg), a collection of masses for five voices
  - Patrocinium musices, Part 3 (Munich: Adam Berg), a collection of liturgical music for five voices
- Giorgio Mainerio – Magnificat in all eight tones for four voices (Venice: Giovanni Bariletto)
- Claudio Merulo – First book of ricercari da cantare for four voices (Venice: the sons of Antonio Gardano)
- Philippe de Monte
  - Third book of motets for five voices (Venice: heirs of Girolamo Scotto)
  - Fifth book of madrigals for five voices (Venice: the sons of Antonio Gardano)
- Melchior Neusidler – Teuetsch Lautenbuch

== Births ==
- January 9 (baptized) – Christoph Buel, German composer
- January 17 – Robert Fludd, English composer and writer (died 1637)
- March 7 (baptized) – John Wilbye, English madrigal composer (died 1638)
- May 14 – Francesco Rasi, Italian tenor (died 1621)
- July 8 (baptized) – Giovanni Battista Stefanini, Italian composer
- September 2 (baptized) – Georg Leopold Fuhrmann, German lutenist, engraver, printer, editor and publisher
- September 27 (baptized) – Jean Dufon, Flemish composer and singer
- date unknown
  - Andreas Hakenberger, composer (died 1627)
  - Francis Tregian the Younger, English recusant and musician, possible compiler of the Fitzwilliam Virginal Book (d. 1618).
  - Claudio Pari, Italian composer (d. c. 1619).

== Deaths ==
- February – Domenico Ferrabosco, Italian composer and singer
- March – Giovanni Contino, Italian composer
- March 5 – Pedro Fernández, Spanish composer
- November – Robert White, English composer
- date unknown
  - Jean Guyon, French composer of chansons
  - Antonfrancesco Doni – Italian writer, academic and musician
