= 1605 in music =

The year 1605 in music involved some significant events.

== Publications ==
- Gregor Aichinger – Psalm 50 Miserere mei for eight, nine, ten, eleven, and twelve voices (Munich: Nikolaus Heinrich)
- Giammateo Asola – Madrigals for six voices (Venice: Ricciardo Amadino)
- Ippolito Baccusi – Le Vergini d'Ippolito Baccusi: second book of madrigals for three voices (Venice: Ricciardo Amadino), contains settings of text from Petrarch's Vergine bella
- Ludovico Balbi – Masses and motets for eight voices (Venice: Angelo Gardano), published posthumously, also includes a Te Deum
- Adriano Banchieri
  - Barca di Venezia per Padova, second book of madrigals for five voices, Op. 12 (Venice: Ricciardo Amadino)
  - L'Organo suonarino, Op. 13 (Venice: Ricciardo Amadino), a collection of organ music and instructions for playing the organ during mass
- Giulio Belli – Compieta, mottetti, & letanie della Madonna for eight voices (two choirs with continuo) (Venice: Angelo Gardano)
- William Byrd – Gradualia, book one, for three, four, and five voices (London: Thomas East)
- Sethus Calvisius – Der Psalter Davids Gesangweis for four voices (Leipzig), a setting of the Becker Psalter
- Antonio Cifra – First book of madrigals for five voices (Rome: Luigi Zannetti)
- Giovanni Croce – Magnificats for eight voices (Venice: Giacomo Vincenti)
- Giacomo Finetti – Completorium for five voices (Venice: Ricciardo Amadino), music for Compline
- Melchior Franck – Deutsche Weltliche Gesäng und Täntze (German Secular Songs and Dances), Part 2, for four voices (Coburg)
- Andrea Gabrieli
  - Canzoni alla francese et ricercari ariosi (Venice: Angelo Gardano), fifth book of his organ music, published posthumously
  - Canzoni alla francese per sonar, sopra stromenti da tasti (Venice: Angelo Gardano), sixth and final book of his organ music, published posthumously
- Marco da Gagliano – Third book of madrigals for five voices (Venice: Angelo Gardano)
- Bartholomäus Gesius – Christliche Hauß und Tisch Musica (Christian House and Table Music) for four voices (Wittenberg: Lorenz Seuberlich for Paul Helwig)
- Ruggiero Giovannelli – First book of madrigals for three voices (Venice: Angelo Gardano)
- Tobias Hume – The first part of ayres (London: John Windet), a collection of songs accompanied by one or two viols
- Johannes Lippius – Fuga a 4 (Strasburg)
- Duarte Lobo – Magnificat for four voices (Antwerp: Plantin)
- Claudio Merulo – Third book of madrigals for six voices (Venice: Angelo Gardano), published posthumously
- Simone Molinaro
  - First book of Magnificats for four voices (Milan: Simon Tini & Filippo Lomazzo)
  - Concerti ecclesiastici for two and four voices (Venice: Ricciardo Amadino)
- Claudio Monteverdi – Il quinto libro de madrigali a cinque voci di Claudio Monteverdi Maestro della Musica del Serenissimo Sig.r Duca di Mantoa, col basso continuo per il Clavicembano, Chittarone, od altro simile istromento; fatto particolarmente per li sei ultimi, per li altri a beneplacito (Fifth book of madrigals for five voices) (Venice: Ricciardo Amadino)
- Benedetto Pallavicino – Sacrae dei laudes... (Venice: Ricciardo Amadino)
- Francis Pilkington – The first booke of songs or ayres of 4. parts (London: Thomas Este)
- Costanzo Porta
  - Psalmodia vespertina for eight voices (Venice: Angelo Gardano), a collection of vespers psalms for every solemnity along with four Magnificats
  - Motets for five voices (Venice: Angelo Gardano)
- Michael Praetorius – Musae Sionae, Part 1
- Enrico Antonio Radesca – First book of canzonettas, madrigals and arie alla romana for two voices (Milan: Simon Tini & Filippo Lomazzo)
- Tomás Luis de Victoria – Officium Defunctorum, sex vocibus, in obitu et obsequiis sacrae imperatricis

== Births ==
- March – Antonio Bertali, Italian composer (died 1669)
- April – Giacomo Carissimi, composer (died 1674)
- April 19 – Orazio Benevoli, composer (died 1672)
- July 9 – Simon Dach, hymn-writer (died 1659)
- September 17 – Francesco Sacrati, early opera composer (died 1650)
- date unknown – Constantia Zierenberg, singer and musician (died 1653)
- probable
  - Johann Vierdanck, violinist, cornettist, and composer (died 1646)
  - Julius Johann Weiland, composer (died 1663)

== Deaths ==
- February 19 – Orazio Vecchi, Italian composer (born 1550)
- September 24 – Manuel Mendes, composer and music teacher (born c. 1547)
- date unknown – Pedro Bermúdez, composer and chapel-master (born 1558)
