= Jan Vencálek =

Bohemian Renaissance-era composer

Jan Vencálek (1570–?) was a Bohemian Renaissance-era composer for the lute and voice. Considered one of the masters in arrangement for lutes, Vencálek's compositions were showcased in Prague during the reign of Rudolph II.

The year 1598 given as his year of birth is an error in the records. He was first mentioned in literature as a lute player in 1598.

== Sources ==
- Hudba v Čechách od nej starších dob až do věku 17ho. In: Dalibor, Volume 5, Number 19-20,
