= Francisca Duarte =

Francisca Duarte (Antwerp, 1595 – Gest Alkmaar, 1640) was a Portuguese singer. She was active as a court singer at the court of the governor in the Spanish Netherlands.

She was the daughter of the banker and jeweler Diego Duarte (1545? -1628) and Leonora Duarte Rodrigues (1565? -1632?), Jewish converts to Catholicism who emigrated from Portugal to the Spanish Netherlands, and married Francisco Ferdinand du Pas (1586-1646) in 1613.

She settled in Alkmaar, where she became acquainted with Maria Tesselschade Visscher, who introduced her to artistic circles, where she was noted to be a great singer, and became the muse of poets. From 1630 onward, she acted as court singer at the court of the general governor of the Spanish Netherlands, Isabella Clara Eugenia and then Cardinal-Infante Ferdinand of Austria. In 1638, for example, she performed to the exiled Maria de Medici. Duarte was famous in contemporary Europe and the subject of poetic celebration for her song.
