= 1589 in music =

== Events ==
- November 30 – Luca Marenzio returns to Rome from Florence.
- The wedding of Duke Ferdinand I of Tuscany is celebrated with six staged intermezzi, featuring music by Emilio de' Cavalieri and Giovanni de' Bardi, which presaged the first operas, and were a formative influence on the Baroque style.
- Tarquinia Molza is dismissed from the court of Duchess Margherita Gonzaga d'Este because of her affair with the composer Giaches de Wert.

== Publications ==
- Costanzo Antegnati – Second book of masses for six and eight voices (Venice: Angelo Gardano)
- Ippolito Baccusi – Third book of masses for five and six voices (Venice: Ricciardo Amadino)
- Ludovico Balbi – Musicale essercitio for five voices (Venice: Angelo Gardano), a collection of madrigals
- Girolamo Belli – Sacrae cantiones (Motets) for eight voices (Venice: Giacomo Vincenti)
- Giulio Belli – First book of madrigals for five and six voices (Venice: Angelo Gardano)
- William Byrd
  - Cantiones Sacrae, Book 1, for five voices (London: Thomas East for William Byrd)
  - Songs of Sundrie Natures for three, four, five, and six voices (London: Thomas East for William Byrd)
  - Madrigals for six voices (London: Thomas East for William Byrd)
- Johannes Eccard – Neue Lieder (New Songs) for four and five voices (Königsberg: Georg Osterberger)
- Andrea Gabrieli
  - Third book of madrigals for five voices (Venice: Angelo Gardano), published posthumously, includes a few pieces by Giovanni Gabrieli
  - Madrigali et ricercari for four voices (Venice: Angelo Gardano), published posthumously
- Jacobus Gallus
  - Harmoniarum moralium (Moral Harmonies) for four voices, book one (Prague: Georg Nigrinus)
  - Epicedion harmonicum (Prague: Georg Nigrinus), a funeral motet
- Ruggiero Giovannelli – Gli sdruccioli for four voices, book two (Venice: Angelo Gardano), a book of madrigals
- Francisco Guerrero
  - Second book of motets for four, five, six, and eight voices (Venice: Giacomo Vincenti)
  - Canciones y villanescas espirituales for three, four, and five voices (Venice: Giacomo Vincenti)
- Konrad Hagius – Die Psalmen Davids for four voices (Dusseldorf: Albert Byuss), sets the translation by Kaspar Ulenberg
- Marc'Antonio Ingegneri – Liber Sacrarum Cantionum for seven to sixteen voices with instruments (Venice: Angelo Gardano)
- Paolo Isnardi – First book of madrigals for six voices (Venice: Angelo Gardano)
- Giovanni de Macque – Second book of madrigals for six voices (Venice: Angelo Gardano)
- Philippe de Monte – Second book of madrigali spirituali for six and seven voices (Venice: Angelo Gardano)
- Jakob Paix – Thesaurus Motetarum, a collection of keyboard arrangements of motets by various composers (Stuttgart, Bernhart Jobin)
- Giovanni Pierluigi da Palestrina – Hymni totius anni... for four voices
- Giovanni Maria Papalia – First book of madrigals for five voices (Messina: Fausto Bufalini)
- Giovanni Tommaso Benedictis da Pascarola – Primo libro de madrigali a cinque voci (Venice: Scipione Riccio)
- Andreas Pevernage – First book of chansons for five voices (Antwerp: Christophe Plantin)
- Salamone Rossi – a collection of 19 canzonette

== Classical music ==
- Giulio Caccini – Io che dal ciel cader farei la luna

== Births ==
- bap. July 2 – Guilielmus Messaus, Flemish composer (d. 1640)
- probable – Giovanni Battista Fontana, violinist and composer (d. 1630)

== Deaths ==
- date unknown – Christian Hollander, kapellmeister at Oudenarde (born c.1510)
- probable
  - Thomas Palfreyman, author and musician
  - Tansen, Hindustani composer and vocalist (born c.1493/1506)
