= Georg Patermann =

German composer and organist

Georg Patermann (c. 1580 – after 1628) was a German composer and organist at St. Jakobi in Rostock and the Schloßkirche Güstrow.

Two wedding motets survive: Quam pulchrae sunt mammae tuae (1610) and Sponsa velut Christo juncta est Ecclesia Sponso (1619)
