= Francesca Campana =

Italian spinet player and composer

Francesca Campana (c. 1615 – 1665) was an Italian spinet player, and composer. She was born in Rome, thought to be the daughter of Andrea Campana, wife of the composer Giovan Carlo Rossi and sister-in-law of Luigi Rossi. In 1629 Francesca Campana published a book of arias in Rome and possibly a book of madrigals which is lost.

== Works ==
Selected works include:

- Arie a 1, 2, e 3 voci, op. 1, collection of arias
- Donna, se ’l mio servir, madrigal for two voices
- Pargoletta, vezzosetta from La Risonanti Sfere for soprano, lute and viola da gamba
