= Mascherata =

A mascherata (Italian f., literally 'masquerade') is a dance from the sixteenth century and was particularly popular in Florence. It was performed by costumed dancers, and frequently pantomimed Roman and Greek themes in them. At the time, it was often associated with villanella, and performed at carnivals with the musicians and singers atop floats.

== Content ==
Frequently the performance was satirical, and many times there were racist undertones in the archetypes or costumes. Generally there wasn't much dramatic content, and most were meant to be humorous.

== Etymology ==
The term mascherata is the past, plural, and feminine version of mascherare which means to mask or hide.

== Lassus ==
Orlande de Lassus was considered the master of mascheratas, and he wrote many of his pieces (mostly madrigals) while in Rome, which saw the birth of madrigals, and more specifically mascheratas.

== See also ==
The wiktionary definition of Mascherata
