= Johannes Khuen =

Johannes K(h)uen (1606 – 14 November 1675), priest, poet, and composer. He was one of the leading literary figures of the early Baroque in Bavaria.

Khuen, who was born in Moosach and studied with the Munich Jesuits in the early 1620s, spent his entire career in the Bavarian capital as a chaplain to the Wartenberg family and beneficiary at the church of St. Peter. Between 1635 and his death he published at least fifteen books of vernacular sacred songs, some in multiple editions, with simple melodies and thoroughbass accompaniment that mark a distinctive stage in the adoption of sacred monody north of the Alps. All were published in Munich, and the relatively narrow distribution of extant exemplars suggests that they were primarily intended for a local or regional audience.

Some of the larger compendia include the Epithalamium Marianum (1644), the Tabernacula pastorum (1650), the Munera pastorum (1651), and the Gaudia pastorum (1655). Khuen's poetry is closely related to that of the Munich "tract school" with which he was associated, and which included among its more prominent members the Munich court secretary Aegidius Albertinus and the Jesuits Jakob Bidermann, Jeremias Drexel, and especially Jakob Balde. Khuen's songbooks reflect the aims of the Bavarian Counter-Reformation in their insistence on Marian, sanctoral, and Christological imagery; their vernacular poetry and folklike strophic melodies were designed for broad appeal.
