= Teodora Ginés =

Dominican Musician

Teodora Ginés (1530–1598) was a Dominican musician and composer that played in Santiago de Cuba cathedral orchestra. She is credited as the creator of the song titled "Son de la Má Teodora," the oldest son montuno.

== Life ==
Ginés was formerly a slave, born in Santiago de los Caballeros, Dominican Republic, but was freed. Along with her sister, Micaela, she emigrated to Cuba, where they were both engaged at the orchestra at the Cathedral of Santiago de Cuba: Micaela as a violinist, and Teodora playing the Bandola.

Teodora is credited with the authorship of the song " Son de la Má Teodora", circa 1562. This song was transcribed by the Cuban musician and composer Laureano Fuentes Matons, in his book "The Arts in Santiago de Cuba" published in 1893. Matons identified "Son de la Má Teodora" as the first Son in Cuban history, which was later confirmed by the Cuban essayist, and musicologist Alejo Carpentier.
