= Johannes Matelart =

Flemish composer

Johannes Matelart (also Matelart, Matellarto, Matelarte and other variations; first name sometimes Ioanne or Jean) (before 1538 – 7 June 1607) was a Flemish composer of the late Renaissance, active in Flanders, Bonn, and Rome.

Details of his life are relatively sparse. He came from west Flanders, and served as choirmaster in Bonn sometime in the earlier portion of his life. By 1558 he had probably come to Italy, staying until 1562, and in 1565 he took the post of maestro di cappella at the church of San Lorenzo in Damaso, where he remained for over 40 years. A note in a publication of 1596 indicates that he still held the post of choirmaster there, and was living in Rome.

Some of his music has survived, and unusually for a Roman composer, much of it is instrumental. He published a book of music for lute, which included not only 15 fantasias by himself, in tablature, but arrangements of pieces by Cristóbal de Morales, and Francesco Canova da Milano.

Matelart also wrote sacred vocal music, including a series of responsories for four and five voices (1596). This collection includes 21 chants by Matelart himself, as well as music by other composers, including Clemens non Papa, Orlande de Lassus, Costanzo Festa, and Giovanni Pierluigi da Palestrina.

A single secular madrigal by Matelart has survived, as well as several other pieces.

== References and further reading ==
- Spiessens, Godelieve. L. Macy (ed.). Ioanne Matelart. Grove Music Online. (subscription required)
- Gustave Reese, Music in the Renaissance. New York, W.W. Norton & Co., 1954. ISBN 0-393-09530-4 (Note: Reese believed that there were two composers of the same name, to account for the wide gap between years of publication, but recent research, as given in the article by Spiessens, contradicts this.)
