= Pietro Pontio =

Italian theorist and composer

- Born: 25 March 1532; Parma
- Died: 27 December 1596 (aged 64); Parma
- Other names: Ponzio
- Occupations: theorist, composer
- Notable work: Ragionamento di Musica

Pietro Pontio (or Ponzio; 25 March 1532 – 27 December 1596) was an Italian theorist and composer.

Pontio was born and died in Parma. He is best known for his 1588 treatise Ragionamento di Musica, which is thought to have influenced Claudio Monteverdi.
