= Alessandro Romano (composer) =

Alessandro Romano, also known as Alexander Romanus and Alexander De Urbe, (1533 – 1592) was an Italian composer, singer, and a virtuoso player of the viola de arco. Upon becoming ordained as an Olivetan monk in 1571 he adopted the religious name of Giulio Cesare (also known as Julius Caesar Romanus).

== Biography ==
Alessandro Romano was born in Rome in 1533. He was long confused with other musicians of the period including Alessandro Merlo. He studied music in Italy with Adrian Willaert and Cipriano de Rore. He was maestro di musica at the Accademia Filarmonica di Verona in 1552–1553 and 1556–1557, and after served intermittent periods as a singer at the Sistine Chapel. He later became a singer at the Archbasilica of Saint John Lateran in 1571; a post which he worked in intermittently in the following years.

Romano's first publication, the book of madrigals Le Vergine con … altri Madrigali was published in Venice in 1554. Another book of madrigals, Primo libro di Madrigali a cinpue voci con due Dialoghi a sette, was published in 1565. His final book of madrigals, Le Sirene … secondo libro de madrigali (1577) was his most original; as his earlier work was more closely imitative of his teachers. He also composed canzones in a Venetian-vein of structure and style that sporadically used text in a Neapolitan dialect. His sacred music output was less; encompassing two known works, Mottecta, liber primus (1580) and Lamentationi a 5 voci pari, libro primo (1582).

In 1571 Romano became a novitiate at the Olivetan Monastery, Rovigo (now the Museum of the Great Rivers), and was given the religious name "Julius Caesar Romanus" at this time. He died in Formia at the monastery attached to the Church of Sant'Erasmo, Formia in 1592.
