= Innocentio Alberti =

Italian instrumentalist and composer

- Born: Innocentio Alberti c. 1535; Italy
- Died: June 1615 (aged 79–80)
- Genres: Renaissance
- Occupations: Instrumentalist, composer

Innocentio Alberti (c. 1535 – June 15, 1615) was an Italian Renaissance instrumentalist and composer. He came from a family of musicians from Treviso. His father was a trumpeter and his brother and uncle were also musicians. He was brought to Padua to be a music tutor in the Accademia degli Elevati under Francesco Portinaro in 1557. When the Accademia was dissolved in 1560 Alberti went to work for the Este court in Ferrara, where he remained on the court rolls until the court's dissolution in 1598. He was listed as "Innocentio del Cornetto" under the list of instrumentalists, suggesting that he played the cornett for the court.

Alberti's first published madrigals were in Cypriano de Rore's fourth book of madrigals for five voices, alongside those of Rore, Portinaro, and other members of the Accademia. His three books of madrigals published in the first decade of the 17th century in Venice are most likely collections of madrigals written between ten and thirty years before. He was a minor composer, however his works show great craftmanship.
