= Annibale Zoilo =

Italian composer (c.1537–1592)

Annibale Zoilo (c. 1537–1592) was an Italian composer and singer of the late Renaissance Roman School. He was a contemporary of Palestrina, writing music in a closely related style, and was a prominent composer and choir director in Rome in the late 16th century.

== Life ==
He was born in Rome, but little documentation remains of his early life. In 1558 he is recorded as a singer at the Cappella Giulia (the Julian Chapel), and in 1561 he was already maestro di cappella of San Luigi de' Francesi; that he rose so quickly to such a prominent position indicates that he was probably a singer prior to the first mention of him at the Cappella Giulia. He retained the position at San Luigi de' Francesi until 1566, and from 1567 to 1570 he was maestro di cappella at St. John Lateran, one of the most prestigious musical posts in Rome. In 1570 he was succeeded there by Frenchman Bartolomeo Roy, and Zoilo left to sing as an alto in the choir of the Sistine Chapel, remaining there until July 1577, at which time he left due to illness. However, by October he was well enough to be appointed by Pope Gregory XIII, along with Palestrina, to edit and revise the music for the Graduale, as well as other liturgical music of the Church.

Zoilo held several other positions after his career at the Sistine Chapel, including maestro di cappella at Todi Cathedral beginning in 1581, his first documented appointment outside of Rome; in 1584 he held a similar position at Santa Casa in Loreto. In addition to his various employments as choirmaster, he was associated with the Oratorio di SS Trinità dei Pellegrini e Convalescenti, in Rome, an organization which paid him on several occasions, possibly for compositions. Zoilo died in Loreto. Why he left Rome, the town of his birth, and the site of his success as a singer and choirmaster, is not documented, but he continued to compose music for the Sistine Chapel choir as late as 1582.

== Music ==
Zoilo's music is similar to Palestrina's in style, using smoothly flowing contrapuntal lines with clear text declamation, with little of the experimental chromaticism and textural elements found in music in northern Italy or Naples at the same time. His sacred music is for four and eight voices, and includes masses, motets, hymns, responds, litanies, suffragia, and other a cappella vocal music.

In addition to his sacred music, he published two books of madrigals. One of his madrigals, Chi per voi non sospira acquired considerable fame, being reprinted in many collections; in addition it was used by Vincenzo Galilei in his Fronimo: dialogo ... sopra l'arte del bene intavolare in a lute intabulation.

== References and further reading ==
- Harry B. Lincoln: "Annibale Zoilo", Grove Music Online, ed. L. Macy (Accessed June 24, 2006), (subscription access)
- Gustave Reese, Music in the Renaissance. New York, W.W. Norton & Co., 1954. ISBN 0-393-09530-4
