= Orfeo Vecchi =

Italian composer

- Born: ca. 1551; Vercelli or Milan
- Died: November 26, 1603; Milan
- Other names: Orfeo Vecchio
- Occupation(s): Composer, choirmaster

Orfeo Vecchi (ca. 1551 – 1603) was an Italian composer and choirmaster. His most important appointment as choirmaster was at Santa Maria alla Scala, Milan. His earliest extant compositions date from 1588.

== Biography ==
Vecchi was born sometime around the year 1551 and educated in the Vercelli Cathedral. In 1580 Vecchi was nominated by Charles Borromeo for the post of the newly created position of "maestro di cappella" at Santa Maria alla Scala, in good part because of the combination of his youth and training. Borromeo vested him with minor orders in 1581, in order to meet the requirements of a 1565 cathedral rule which stated that musicians were to be chosen from clergy. Nonetheless, Vecchi's appointment to the position remained controversial, and he vacated two years later in favor of the same position at the Vercelli Cathedral. He returned to Santa Maria alla Scala after another four years. There he was unsuccessfully nominated for a position of chaplain at the altar of San Giovanni. In 1591 he applied for the position of mansionarius at Santa Maria alla Scala, in which he sang Ambrosian plainchant. This effort was successful. He died in 1603.

== Impact ==
He was prolific as a church composer in the post-Tridentine style, and became the foremost sacred music composer in Milan in his time. His tenure at Santa Maria alla Scala returned the institution to its leading place among musical establishments in Milan. His influence on English composer Peter Philips was significant. His reputation was such that a collection of his work was published (though at no benefit to himself) in its entirety outside Milan.

== Compositions ==
He is best known for his two collections of "sacred madrigals", La Donna vestita di sole (1590) and Scielta de Mardrigali (1604). The second of these, published by his brother a year after his death, contains works borrowed from the secular madrigals of other composers, and modified into motets with Latin sacred texts substituting for the original lyrics. Vecchi has been noted for arranging his works in such a manner as to render the words in an appreciable manner to the listener. It has also been noted that he was able to write music for large ensembles at remarkable speed. His output of motets, psalms, masses, and other musical works was unmatched in his time.
