= Agostino Agazzari =

Italian composer and music theorist

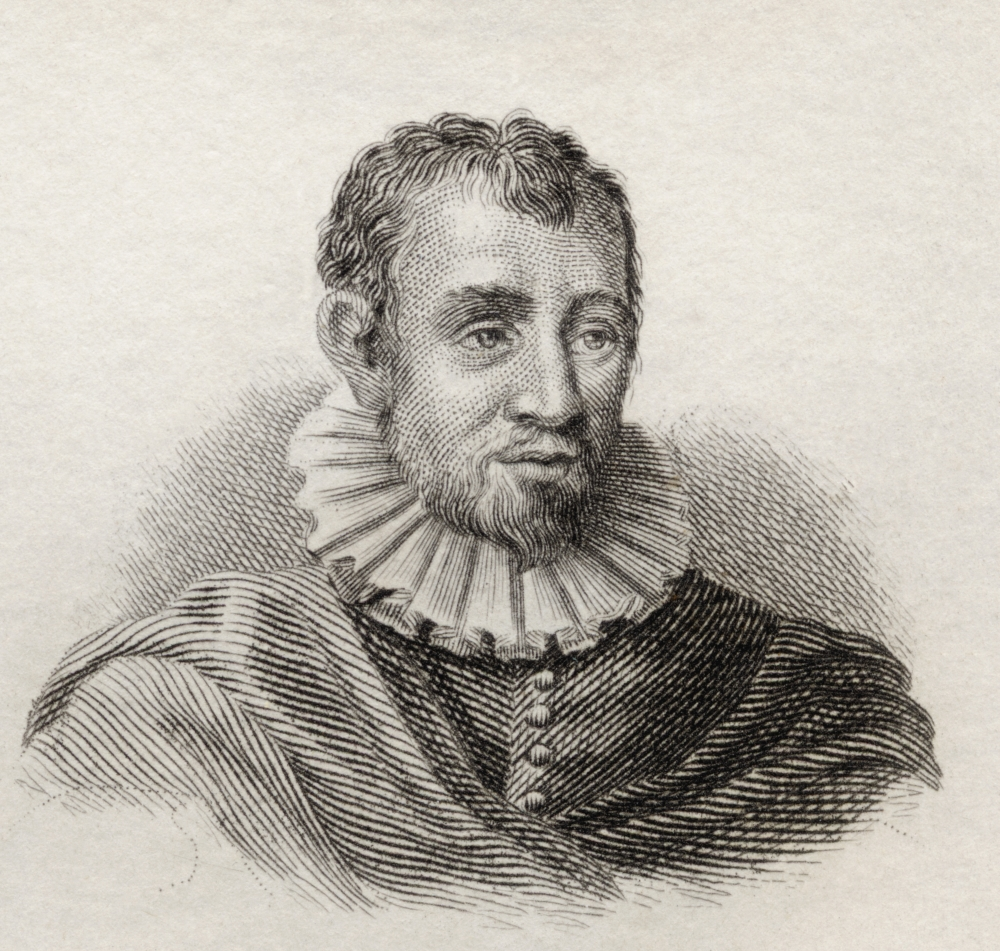
Agostino Agazzari

Agostino Agazzari (2 December 1578 – 10 April 1640) was an Italian composer and music theorist.

== Life ==
Agazzari was born in Siena to an aristocratic family. After working in Rome, as a teacher at the Roman College, he returned to Siena in 1607, becoming first organist and later choirmaster of the cathedral there. He was a close friend of Lodovico Grossi da Viadana, the early innovator of the basso continuo.

Agazzari wrote several books of sacred music, madrigals and the pastoral drama Eumelio (1606). Stylistically, Eumelio is similar to the famous composition by Cavalieri, Rappresentatione di Anima, e di Corpo of 1600, a work of singular significance in the development of the oratorio. In the preface to the drama he mentions that he was asked to set the text to music only one month before the performance; he composed the music in two weeks, and copied the parts and rehearsed it in the remaining two weeks, a feat which would be impressive even in the modern age.

Agazzari is best known, however, for Del sonare sopra il basso (1607), one of the earliest and most important works on basso continuo. This treatise was immensely important in the diffusion of the technique throughout Europe: for example, Michael Praetorius used large portions of it in his Syntagma musicum in Germany in 1618-1619. As was true with many late Renaissance and early Baroque theoretical treatises, it described a practice which was already occurring. In large part it was based on a study of his friend Viadana's Cento concerti ecclesiastici (published in Venice in 1602), the first collection of sacred music to use the basso continuo.

Most of his compositions are sacred music, of which motets of the early Baroque variety (for two or three voices with instruments) predominate. All of the motets are accompanied by basso continuo, with organ providing the sustaining line. His madrigals, on the other hand, are a cappella, in the late Renaissance style, so Agazzari simultaneously showed extreme progressive tendencies as well as some more conservative ones: unusually, his progressive music was sacred, and his conservative was secular, a situation almost unique among composers of the early Baroque.

He died in Siena.

== Theoretical works ==
- Del sonare sopra'l basso con tutti li stromenti e dell'uso loro nel conserto. Siena: Domenico Falcini, 1607.
- La musica ecclesiastica dove si contiene la vera diffinitione della musica come scienza, non più veduta, e sua nobilità. Siena: Bonetti, 1638.
