= Valerio Bona =

Italian composer

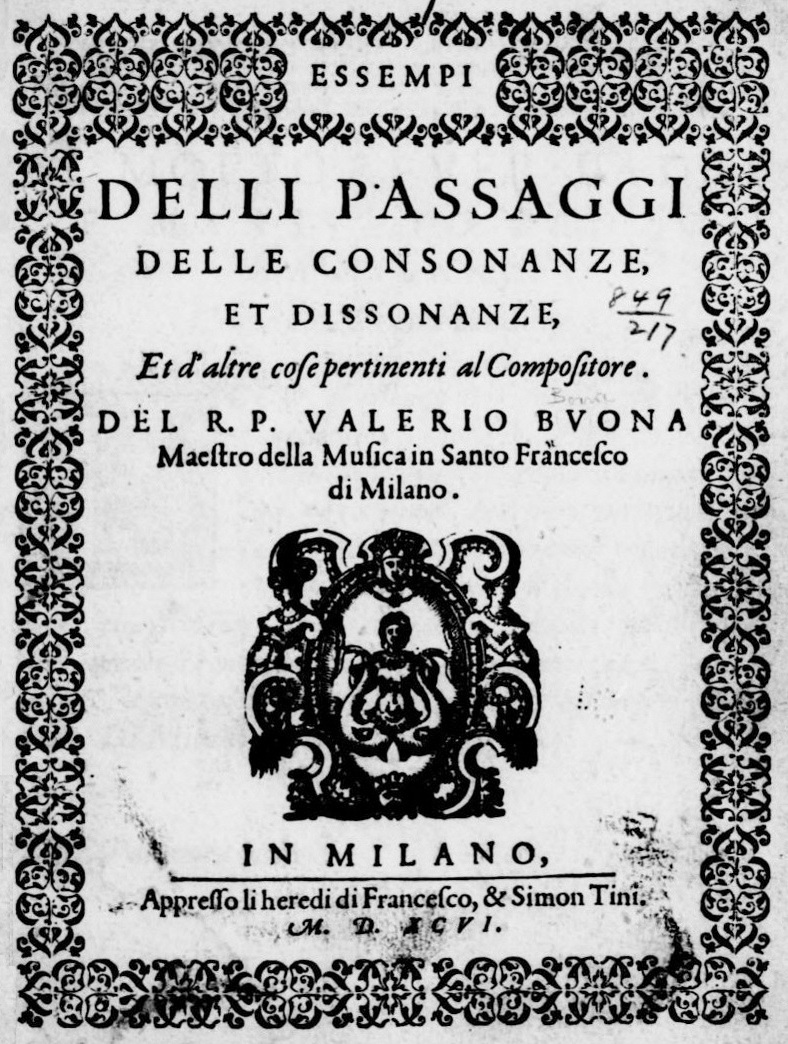
Essempi delli passaggi delle consonanze et dissonanze, 1596

Valerio Bona or Buona (c. 1560 – c. 1620) was an Italian composer of the early Baroque; he was also a Franciscan friar. Little is known about his life. He appears to have spent time in Milan and Verona, and may have been a student of Costanzo Porta. His theoretical Regole del contraponto of 1595 was influenced by Gioseffo Zarlino. His musical works include masses and canzonas.
