= Joachim a Burck =

German composer (1546–1610)

Joachim von Burck, also Joachim a Burgk or Joachim Moller (Burg, 1546-Mühlhausen, 24 May 1610) was a German composer, notable for an early German Passion setting. As Johann Sebastian Bach's predecessor at the church of St Blasius, he pioneered the musical life in post-Reformation Mühlhausen, bringing it to early fruition. Influenced by the tradition of Flemish polyphony and the Italian madrigal, he developed his own style, focusing on clarity of expression. Considering himself a servant to the word of God, he discovered the German language as the foundation of his work, pragmatically addressing the congregation: "for I have aimed to set the words to the music in a manner that almost each syllable has its own note and that the four parts sing the words simultaneously in order that the listener can hear the words clearly." Burck's compositions were widely disseminated and acclaimed for their suitability for common use.
