= Sethus Calvisius =

German composer (1556–1615)

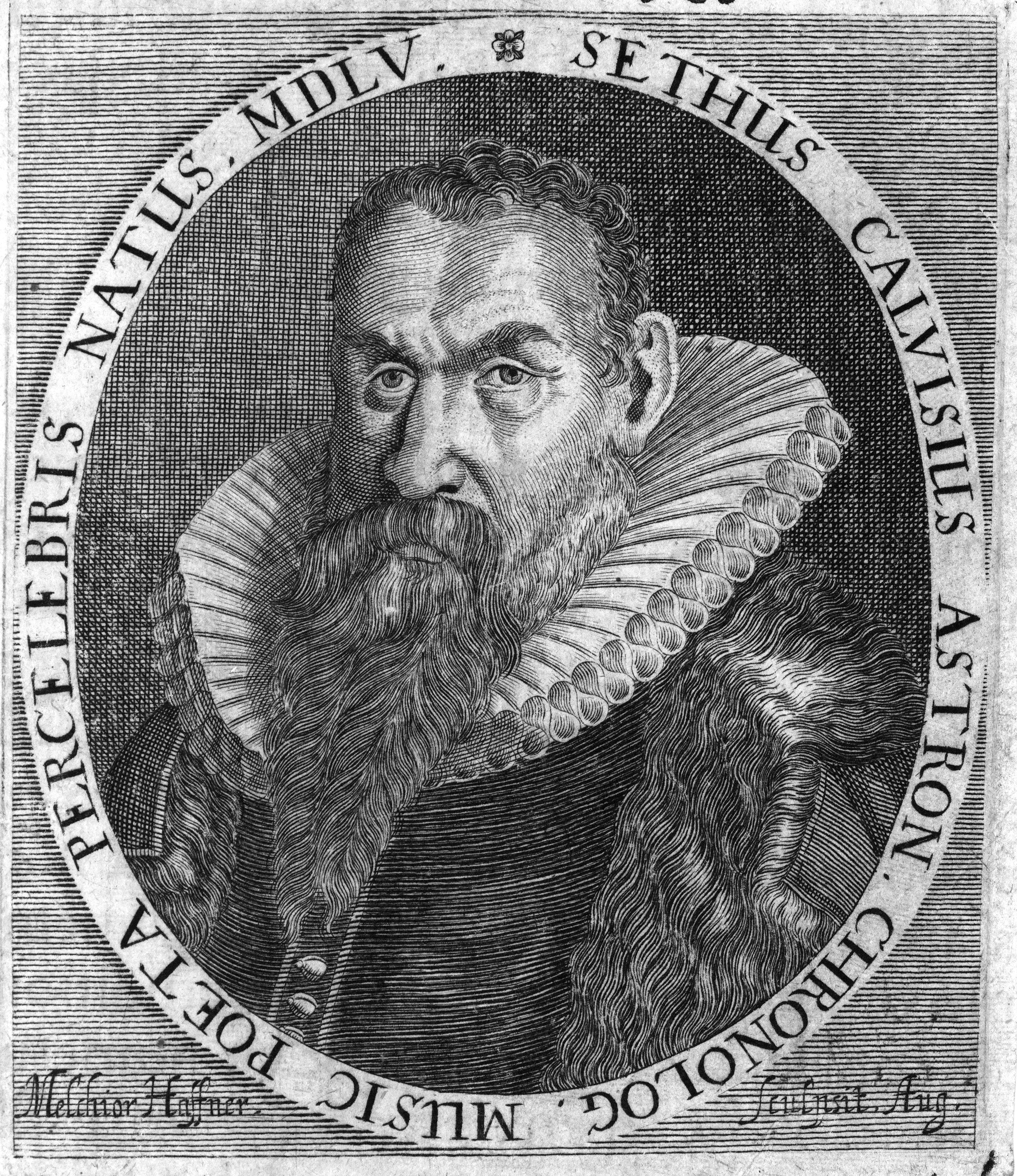
Sethus Calvisius

Sethus Calvisius or Setho Calvisio, originally Seth Kalwitz (21 February 1556 – 24 November 1615), was a German music theorist, composer, chronologer, astronomer, and teacher of the late Renaissance.

== Biography ==
He was born into a peasant family at Gorsleben in present-day Thuringia. By the exercise of his musical talents he earned money enough for the start, at Helmstedt, of a university career, which the aid of a wealthy patron enabled him to continue at Leipzig. He became director of the music-school at Pforta in 1572. In 1594 he was transferred to Leipzig in the same post, including directing the Thomanerchor at the Thomaskirche. He retained this post until his death in Leipzig, despite the offers successively made to him of mathematical professorships at Frankfurt and Wittenberg.

Calvisius was also a significant astronomer: in his Opus Chronologicum (Leipzig, 1605, 7th ed. 1685) he expounded a system based on the records of nearly 300 eclipses. An ingenious, though ineffective, proposal for the reform of the calendar was put forward in his Elenchus Calendarii Gregoriani (Frankfurt, 1612); and he published a book on music, Melodiae condendae ratio (Erfurt, 1592). He composed choral pieces including Unser Leben währet siebzig Jahr.

== Works ==
- Harmonia cantionum ecclesiasticarum, Kirchengesänge u. geistliche Lieder D. Lutheri u. andrer frommen Christen, Mit 4 Stimmen contrapunktweise richtig gesetzt. Leipzig 1597, 1598, 1604, 1612 and 1622
- Melopoiia sive melodiae condendae ratio. Erfurt 1592 and 1630
- Compendium musicae practicae. Leipzig 1594, also published in 1612 as Musicae artis praecepta
- Exercitatio musica tertia. Leipzig 1611
- Exercitationes musicae duae. Leipzig 1600
- Hymni sacri Latini et Germanici. Erfurt 1594
- Der Psalter Davids., Cornelius Becker (ed.), Leipzig 1605
- Der 150. Psalm Davids. Leipzig 1615
- Opus chronologicum ex autoritate s. scripturae ad motum luminarium coelestium contextum. Leipzig 1605 (first edition), Frankfurt 1685 (6th edition)
- Elenchus calendarii Gregoriani. Leipzig 1613
- Formula calendarii novi. Leipzig 1613
- Thesaurus latini sermonis. Leipzig 1614
- Enchiridion lexici Latino-Germanici. Leipzig 1614
- Tricinia, Auserlesene deutsche Lieder., Paul Rubardt (ed.), 1949
- 10 Motetten, Albrecht Tunger (ed.), 1965.
- Biciniorum libri duo, Leipzig 1612
