= Gregor Aichinger =

German composer (1564/65 – 1628)

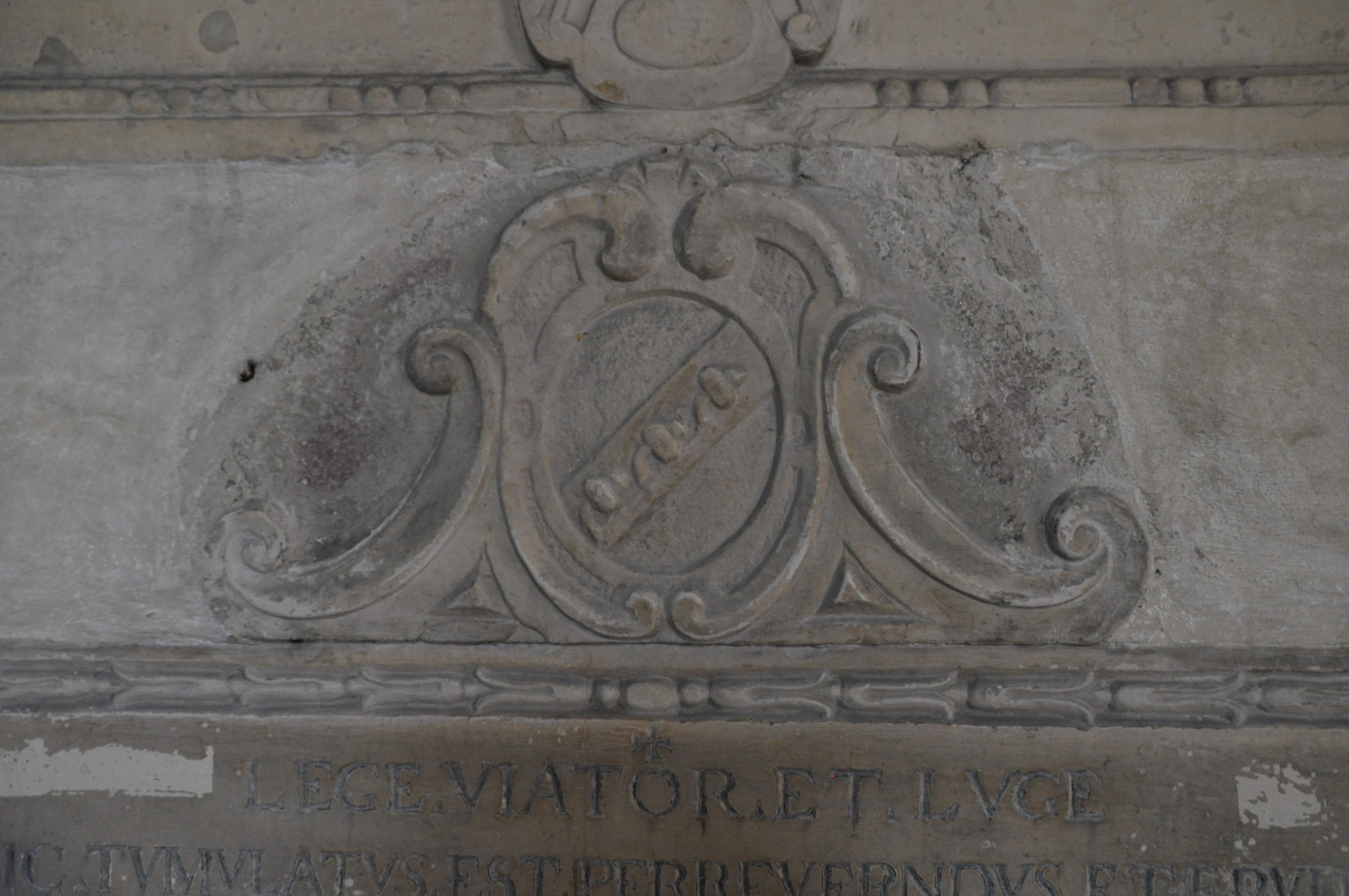
- Coat of arms at the top of his gravestone Augsburg Cathedral
- Born: 1564 or 1565
- Died: night of 20/21 January 1628
- Occupation: Composer

Gregor Aichinger (1564 or 1565 – night of 20/21 January 1628) was a German composer. Karl Proske, in the preface to vol. 2 of his Musica Divina, calls him a priest of Regensburg, and praises him for the devout and ingenuous mastery of his style.

== Life ==
His epitaph states he died in 1628 aged 63, making his birth year 1564 or 1565. In 1577 he moved to Munich to study under Orlando di Lasso, moving the following year to the University of Ingolstadt, where he studied alongside Jakob Fugger, later Prince Bishop of Constance. This put him in contact with the wider Fugger family of Augsburg, to whom he later dedicated many of his works.

Jakob's main patron was Jakob III. Fugger (1542–1598), who appointed him his organist in 1584, using an instrument he had paid for in 1580 at the Augsburg basilica of St.s Ulrich and Afra. He also made Aichinger his court composer and director of his chamber-music. Fugger also funded a number of Italian trips for Aichinger – in Venice he became one of Giovanni Gabrieli's first pupils and probably also converted from Protestantism to Catholicism.

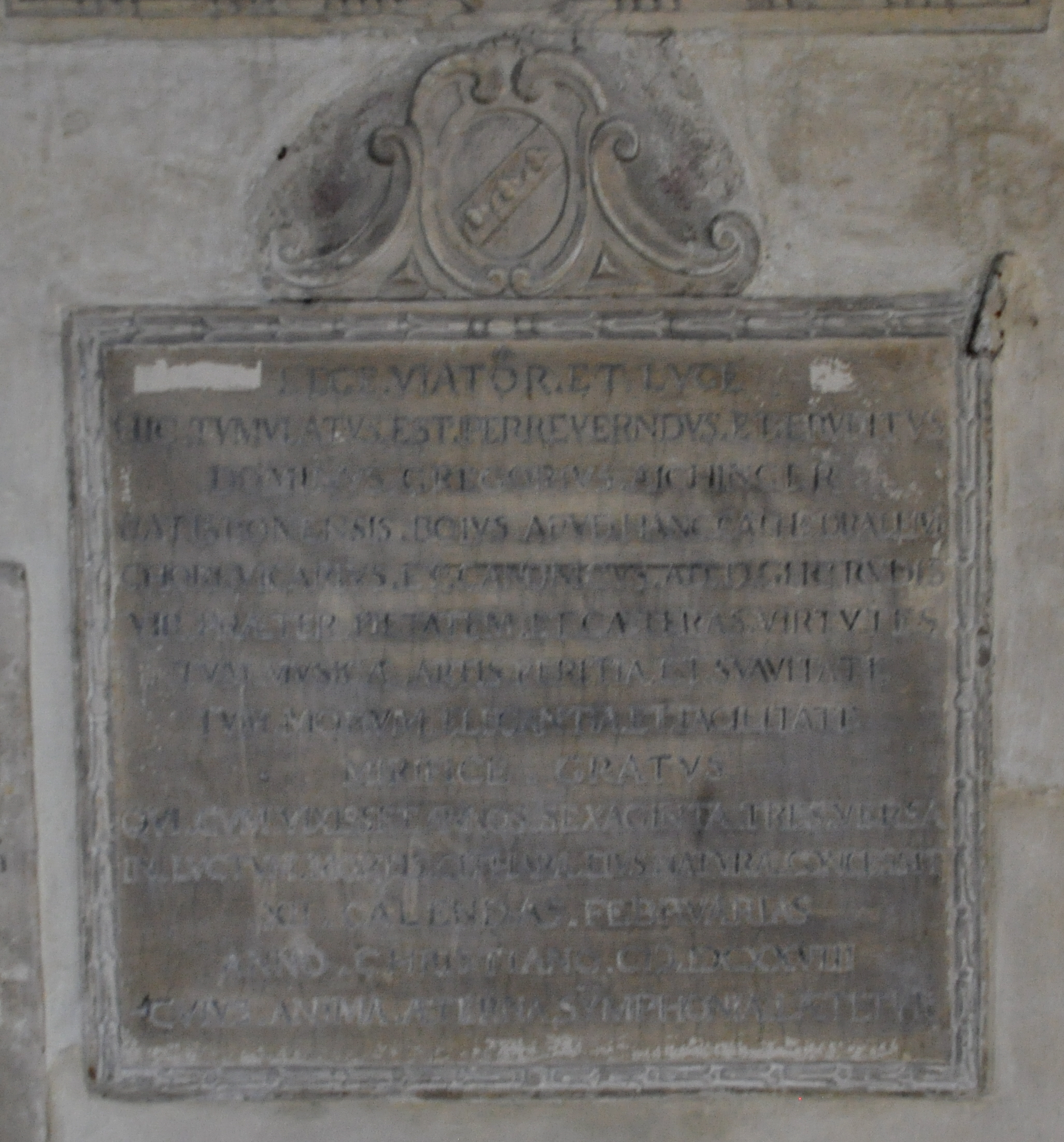
His gravestone in Augsburg Cathedral

Fugger granted him more study leave in 1588 during which he studied theology and philosophy back at the University of Ingolstadt. In 1599 or 1600 Aichinger travelled to Rome, spending two years there – the main intent of the stay was musical but during it he was probably ordained priest (though some sources state he had taken holy orders before he was appointed by the Fuggers).

Back in Augsburg he was made a canon of St. Gertrud's chapel at the east end of Augsburg Cathedral as well as vicar of the cathedral choir, a position endowed with many rich prebends. He later died in the city, possibly of the plague, which was rife in the city that year, or of a kidney stone for which he had had an unsuccessful operation on 2 January that year.

His successors are recorded as applying for his offices on 21 January, the date of his death. His extensive library, consisting of musical, geographical, theological and botanical works by famous authors, was bequeathed to the cathedral chapter and parts of it were later transferred to the Augsburg and Munich State Libraries.

== Epitaph ==
His epitaph states that "in addition to his piety and other virtues, he was extraordinarily popular both due to his knowledge of music and kindness, and due to his fine manners and his affability". In full it reads:

LEGE VIATOR ET LVGE
HIC TVMVLATVS EST PERREVERENDVS ET ERVDITUS
DOMINVS GREGORIVS AICHINGER
RATISBONENSIS BOIVS APVD HANC CATHEDRALEM
CHORI VICARIVS ET CANONICVS AD D[IVAE] GERTRVDIS
VIR PRAETER PIETATEM ET CAETERAS VIRTVTES
TVM MUSICAE ARTIS PERITIA ET SUAVITATE
TVM MORVM ELEGANTIA ET FACILITATE
MIRIFICE GRATVS
QVI CVM VIXISSET ANNOS SEXAGINTA TRES VERSA.
IN LVCTVM MORTIS CITHARA EIVS NATVRAE CONCESSIT
XII CALENDAS FEBRVARIAS
ANNO CHRISTIANO CIↃ IↃCXXVIII (Note: Roman numerals in Apostrophus method)
CIVIS ANIMA AETERNA SYMPHONIA LAETETVR

Traveller, read and mourn.
Here is buried the most honourable and scholarly
Sir Gregor Aichinger
from Regensburg, a Boius, at this cathedral
choir vicar and canon at St Gertrud
a man who besides piety and other virtues
both in music and art skilled and sweet
and in manners elegant and easy
wonderfully grateful
who, having lived sixty-three years,
turned his harp to the mourning of death and gave in to nature
12 days before the calends of February
Christian year 1628
A citizen's soul rejoices in an eternal symphony.

== Works ==
Aichinger wrote several works for church use, mainly vocal ones in Latin and often in the Venetian polychoral style thanks to his study under Gabrieli – his first published collections of 1590 and 1595 were even both published in Venice. Later he also composed works with basso continuo, published for the first time in his 1607 Cantiones Ecclesiasticae and his 1609 Divina laudes. Aichinger made a major contribution to popularising this 'nuovo musiche' style in the German-speaking lands.

- Sacrae Cantiones, quatuor, quinque, sex, octo et decem vocum, Angelus Gardanus, Venice 1590 RISM 990000518
- Liber secundus sacrarum cantionum, Angelus Gardanus, Venice 1595 RISM 990000519
- Liber tertius sacrarum cantionum, quinque, sex, septem & octo vocum, Paul Kauffmann, Nuremberg 1597 RISM 990000520 RISM 990000521
- Tricinia Mariana, quibus antiphonae, hymni, Magnificat, litaniae, et variae laudes ex officio Beatiss. Virginis suavissimis modulis decantantur, 1598 RISM 990000522
- Odaria lectissima, Augsburg 1601 RISM 990000524
- Divinae laudes ex floridis for three voices, Dominicus Costos, Augsburg 1602 RISM 990000526
- Liturgica sive sacra officia, ad omnes dies festos Magnae Dei Matris per annum celebrari solitos, quarternis vocibus ad modos musicos fact, Johann Praetorius, Augsburg 1603 RISM 990000529
- Vespertinum Virginis canticum sive Magnificat quinis vocibus varie modulatur. Augsburg 1603 RISM 990000530
- Ghirlanda di canzonette spirituali a tre voci, Augsburg 1603 RISM 990000531
- Lacrimae de Virginis et Ioannis in Christum à cruce depositum, modis musicis expressæ, Johann Praetorius, Augsburg 1604 RISM 990000532
- Psalmus L., Miserere mei deus, musicis modis ad IIX, IX, X, XI, XII voces variè compositus, Nicolaus Henricus, München 1605 RISM 990000533
- Solennia Augustissimi Corporis Christi, in sanctissimo sacrificio missae & in eusdem festi officijs, ac publicis supplicationibus seu processionibus cantari solita, Johann Praetorius, Augsburg 1606 RISM 990000534 1607 RISM Search
- Vulnera Christi, for three and four vocies, Adam Meltzer, Dillingen 1606 RISM Search
- Fasciculus Sacrarum harmoniarum for four voices, Adam Meltzer, Dillingen 1606 RISM Search
- Cantiones eclesiasticae for three and four voices, Adam Meltzer, Dillingen 1607 RISM Search
- Virginalia: laudes aeternae Virginis Mariae, Magnae Dei Matris complexa, for five voices, Adam Meltzer, Dillingen 1607 RISM Search
- Divinarum laudum, for three voices, second part, Adam Meltzer, Dillingen 1608 RISM Search
