= Tiburtio Massaino =

Italian composer

Tiburzio Massaino (also Massaini and Tiburtio) (Cremona, before 1550 – Piacenza or Lodi, after 1608) was an Italian composer.

== Life ==
He was an Augustinian friar in Piacenza. He became maestro di cappella at S Maria del Popolo in Rome in 1571. He moved to Modena in 1578, Lodi in 1580 and Salò in 1587 before arriving at Innsbruck in the service of Archduke Ferdinand II in 1589-1590. He is registered then in Salzburg in 1591; in Prague where he met Philippe de Monte till 1594 when he left for Piacenza and Cremona. He was again in Piacenza in 1598 before being maestro di cappella in Lodi (1600–1608). Adriano Banchieri reports he was maestro di cappella in Piacenza in 1609.

== Works ==
=== Sacred works ===
- Concentus in universos psalmos … in vesperis omnium festorum per totum annum frequentatos, cum 3 Magnificat, 5, 9vv (1576 and 1588)
- Motectorum liber primus, 5, 6vv (1576)
- Missae liber primus: Missa ‘Rorate coeli’, Missa ‘Nuncium vobis’, Missa ‘Omnes gentes’, 5, 6vv (1578)
- Sacri cantus … liber secundus, 5vv (1580)
- Psalmi omnes ad vesperas per totum annum decantandi, una cum Magnificat, 8vv (1587)
- Secundus liber missarum, 5vv (1587)
- Motectorum … liber tertius, 5vv (1590)
- Liber primus cantionum ecclesiasticarum, 4vv (Prague, 1592; 1580 edn cited in FétisB); ed. In DTÖ, cx (1964)
- Sacrae cantiones … liber primus, 6vv (1592)
- Sacri modulorum concentus, 6–10, 12vv (1592)
- Primus liber missarum, 6vv (1595)
- Sacrae cantiones … liber secundus, 6vv (1596)
- Tertius liber missarum, 5vv (1598)
- Motectorum liber quartus, 5vv (1599)
- Musica super Threnos Ieremiae prophete in maiori hebdomada decantandas, 5vv (1599)
- Missarum liber primus, 8vv (1600)
- Sacrae cantiones … liber tertius, 6vv (1601)
- Sacri modulorum concentus, 8–10, 12, 15, 16vv, op.31 (1606)
- Musica per cantare con l'organo, 1–3vv, org, op.32 (160719)
- Sacrarum cantionum liber primus, 7vv, bc (org), op.33 (1607)
- Quaerimoniae cum responsoriis infra hebdomadam sanctam concinendae, et passiones pro Dominica Palmarum, & feria sexta, 5vv (1609)
- 420 Bongerino Masterino
- 2 masses
- 3 Magnificats,
- 21 motets,
- 20 other sacred vocal works

=== Secular works ===
- Il primo libro de madrigali, 4vv (1569)
- Il primo libro de madrigali, 5vv (1571)
- Il secondo libro de madrigali, 4vv (1573)
- Il secondo libro de madrigali, 5vv (1578)
- Trionfo di musica … libro primo, 6vv (15793)
- Il terzo libro de madrigali, 5vv (1587)
- Il quarto libro de madrigali, 5vv (1594)
- Madrigali … libro primo, 6vv (1604)
- Il secondo libro de madrigali, 6vv (1604)
- 4 madrigals, 5, 6vv

=== Instrumental ===
- 3 canzonas, 4 madrigals transcribed for lute
- 3 canzonas

== Sources ==
- David Bryant's article in New Grove Dictionary of Music
