= Giulio Belli =

Italian composer

Giulio Belli (c. 1560 – 1621 or later) was an Italian composer of the late Renaissance and early Baroque eras. He was a prolific composer during the transitional time between the two musical eras, and worked in many cities in northern Italy.

== Life ==
He was born in Longiano, near Forlì. He studied in Naples as a boy, but most of his career was spent in northern Italy. In 1582 he took a position as maestro di cappella at Imola cathedral. For the rest of his life he worked in a number of Italian cities in a similar capacity: in Carpi (1591), Venice, at Cà Grande (1594 or 1595), Montagnana (1595), Ferrara (1597), Osimo (1599), Ravenna (1600), Reggio (1603), Forlì (later in 1603–1606). In 1606 he briefly returned to his post at Cà Grande in Venice, but almost immediately quit and moved to Padua to become maestro di cappella at the church of S Antonio there. His succession of appointments continued: in 1610 he was maestro di cappella at Assisi; in 1611 he returned to Imola, where he stayed for two years; and he returned to Cà Grande again, in 1615. In 1621 he moved back to Imola to resume his position there yet again; records of his activities end at that point.

While his rapid changes of employment might give one the impression of a restless and unfaithful employee, he apparently was highly regarded as an honorable and professional man. What kept him from being in the first rank of composers may have been his succession of employments in backwater areas — for example he never held a post at San Marco, and his stay in Ferrara coincided with the takeover of that formerly avant-garde musical center by the Papal States.

== Music and influence ==
Belli's output of sacred music was impressive. He wrote numerous masses, many with basso continuo, showing his familiarity with contemporary practice. He also wrote psalm settings, and "sacred concertos" in the stile concertato — one of the most distinctive forms of the Italian early Baroque. His earlier music is mostly in the Palestrina style of balanced polyphony, though he used polychoral techniques, in keeping with northern Italian practice.

His secular music includes madrigals and canzonettas; some were famous enough to be anthologized by Thomas Morley in England.

== References and further reading ==
- Othmar Wessely: "Belli, Giulio", in The New Grove Dictionary of Music and Musicians, ed. Stanley Sadie. 20 vol. London, Macmillan Publishers Ltd., 1980. ISBN 1-56159-174-2
- Gustave Reese, Music in the Renaissance. New York, W.W. Norton & Co., 1954. ISBN 0-393-09530-4
- Manfred Bukofzer, Music in the Baroque Era. New York, W.W. Norton & Co., 1947. ISBN 0-393-09745-5
