= Ricciardo Amadino =

Venetian printer

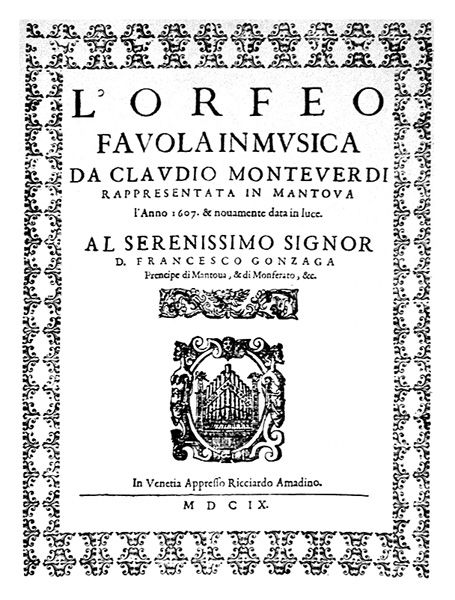
Frontispiece of Monteverdi's opera L'Orfeo, printed in 1609, showing Amadino's name and printer's mark (the image of an organ).

Ricciardo Amadino (fl. 1572–1621) was a Venetian printer, specialising in music.

Amadino briefly attempted to publish music on his own in 1579, but was unsuccessful. He joined with Giacomo Vincenti, with whom he published over 80 books between 1583 and 1586. Many of these were reprints of popular madrigal books, but some were first printings. Their partnership ended around 1586, but they continued to work together occasionally. After 1586, Amadino's mark was a woodcut of an organ, and he printed primarily music, with a few theoretical treatises, including the first edition of Ercole Bottrigari's Il desiderio. He printed editions of such important composers as Luca Marenzio and Claudio Monteverdi, and in terms of sheer output was one of the foremost Italian music printers. His Monteverdi publications include two celebrated first editions, the opera L'Orfeo (1609) and a church music collection in 1610 containing the Vespro della Beata Vergine and a mass.
