= 1627 in music =

List of years in music	(table)
- … 1617; 1618; 1619; 1620; 1621; 1622; 1623; 1624; 1625; 1626; 1627; 1628; 1629; 1630; 1631; 1632; 1633; 1634; 1635; 1636; 1637 …
- Art; Archaeology; Architecture; Literature; Music; Philosophy; Science; +...

The year 1627 in music involved some significant events.

== Events ==
- January 13 – Tarquinio Merula is officially appointed maestro di cappella in Cremona, after having been elected provisionally the previous year.
- June 21 – Christopher Gibbons election as a scholar of the Charterhouse is approved by the Governors, following his nomination in January through the Signet Office.

== Published music ==
- Giovanni Battista Abatessa – Corona di vaghi fiori..., a collection of songs with alfabeto notation, for the guitar, published in Venice
- Giacinto Bondioli – Psalms for five voices, Op. 8 (Venice: Bartolomeo Magni for Gardano)
- Carlo Farina
  - Ander Theil newer Paduanen, Gagliarden, Couranten, französischen Arien
  - Il terzo libro delle pavane, gagliarde, brand: mascherata, arie franzese, volte, corrente, sinfonie
- Melchior Franck
  - Deliciae convivales for four, five, and six instruments with basso continuo (Coburg: Johann Forckel for Friederich Gruner), a collection of intradas
  - Neues fröhliches musikalisches Concert for seven voices and organ bass (Coburg: Johann Forckel), a wedding motet
  - Christliche Musicalische Glückwündschung auß den recht schönen tröstlichen Worten Esai. 43. Fürchte dich nicht denn ich habe dich erlöset for six voices (Coburg: Johann Forckel), a wedding motet
- Sigismondo d'India – First book of motets for four voices (Venice: Alessandro Vincenti)
- Carlo Milanuzzi – Concerto sacro di salmi intieri for two and three voices, book 1, Op. 14 (Venice: Alessandro Vincenti)
- Francesco Pasquali – Third book of madrigals, Op. 5 (Rome: Paolo Masotti)

== Classical music ==
- Girolamo Frescobaldi – Il secondo libro di toccate
- Johann Ulrich Steigleder – Tabulaturbuch, 40 variations on Vater unser

== Opera ==
- Heinrich Schütz – Dafne

== Births ==
- April 9 – Johann Caspar Kerll, organist and composer (died 1693)

== Deaths ==
- March 23 – Lodovico Zacconi, composer (born 1555)
- May 2 – Lodovico Grossi da Viadana, Italian composer and monk (born c.1560)
- August 21 – Jacques Mauduit, composer (born 1557)
- November 30 – Pedro Ruimonte, musician and composer (born 1565)
- December – Thomas Lupo the elder, viol player and composer (born 1571)
- date unknown
  - Abdul Rahim Khan-I-Khana, poet and composer (born 1556)
  - Leone Leoni, composer (born c.1560)
