= 1629 in music =

List of years in music	(table)
- … 1619; 1620; 1621; 1622; 1623; 1624; 1625; 1626; 1627; 1628; 1629; 1630; 1631; 1632; 1633; 1634; 1635; 1636; 1637; 1638; 1639 …
- Art; Archaeology; Architecture; Literature; Music; Philosophy; Science; +...

The year 1629 in music involved some significant events.

== Events ==
- Gregorio Allegri is appointed to compose for the Sistine Chapel.
- The wooden opera house of Teatro San Cassiano in Venice burns down.

== Classical music ==
- Antonio Cifra
  - Motets and psalms for twelve voices (Venice: Alessandro Vincenti)
  - Motets and psalms for eight voices (Venice: Bartolomeo Magni for Gardano)
  - Motets for two, three, four, six, and eight voices (Venice: Bartolomeo Magni for Gardano)
- Scipione Dentice – Madrigali spirituali for five voices (Naples: Lazaro Scoriggio)
- Ignazio Donati – Madre de quatordeci figli, nihil difficile volenti, the second book of motets for five voices in concerto (Venice: Alessandro Vincenti)
- Melchior Franck
  - Prophetia Evangelica for four voices (Coburg: Johann Forckel), a setting of Isaiah 53
  - Votiva Columbae Sioneae suspiria (Coburg: Johann Forckel), a collection of motets
  - Christliche Musicalische Glückwündschung for six voices (Coburg: Johann Forckel), a wedding motet setting Song of Songs 4
  - Christliche Musicalische Glückwünschung auß dem 37. Capitel Syrachs for six voices (Coburg: Kaspar Bertsch), a wedding motet
  - Aller Christgläubigen bester Trost Bey innstehenden letzten betrübten und gefährlichen Zeiten auß dem 3. Capitel der Klaglieder Jeremiae for five voices (Coburg: Kaspar Bertsch), a birthday motet
  - Evangelium Paradisiacum for five voices (Coburg: Johann Forckel)
- Biagio Marini – Sonata per sonar con due corde, Op. 8
- Carlo Milanuzzi – First book of Masses a tre concertate for seven and eleven voices with four instruments and basso continuo, Op. 16 (Venice: Alessandro Vincenti)
- Asprilio Pacelli - Missae... (Venice, Alessandro Vicentini) published posthumously
- Heinrich Schütz – Symphoniae sacrae, part 1, published in Venice

== Opera ==
- Giovanni Rovetta – Le lagrime di Erminia

== Births ==
- January 13 – Lelio Colista, Italian composer and lutenist (died 1680)
- April 1 – Jean-Henri d'Anglebert, composer and harpsichordist (died 1691)
- Baptized September 3 – Lady Mary Dering, composer (died 1704)

== Deaths ==
- January 27 – Hieronymus Praetorius, composer and organist (born 1560)
- April 19 – Sigismondo d'India, Italian composer (born c.1582)
- May 5 – Joachim Burmeister, German composer and music theorist (born 1564)
- October 2 – Antonio Cifra, Baroque composer (born 1584)
- date unknown
  - Paolo Agostino, composer and organist (born c.1583)
  - Gaspar Fernandes, organist and composer (born 1566)
