= 1625 in music =

List of years in music	(table)
- … 1615; 1616; 1617; 1618; 1619; 1620; 1621; 1622; 1623; 1624; 1625; 1626; 1627; 1628; 1629; 1630; 1631; 1632; 1633; 1634; 1635 …
- Art; Archaeology; Architecture; Literature; Music; Philosophy; Science; +...

The year 1625 in music involved some significant events.

== Events ==
- Jacques Gaultier becomes a musician at the court of King Charles I of England.

== Publications ==
- Agostino Agazzari – Eucharisticum melos..., Op. 20 (Rome: Luca Antonio Soldi)
- Adriano Banchieri
  - La sampogna musicale (The musical Syrinx) (Bologna: Girolamo Mascheroni)
  - Il principiante fanciullo (The beginning child) for two voices, Op. 46 (Venice: Bartolomeo Magni for Gardano), a collection of musical exercises for young singers
- Manuel Cardoso – First book of masses for four, five, and six voices (Lisbon: Pedro Craesbeck)
- Melchior Franck
  - Newes Musicalisches Opusculum for five voices (Coburg: Johann Forckel for Salomon Gruner), a collection of intradas
  - Gratulatio Musica for six voices (Coburg: Johann Forckel), a wedding motet for the jurist Johann Bechstedt
  - Geistliche Vermählung des Herrn Christi mit einer glaubigen Seel aus dem schönen Spruch Hoseæ 2 for six voices (Coburg: Johann Forckel), a wedding motet
- Carlo Milanuzzi – Second book of sacra cetra concertata con affetti ecclesiastici for two, three, four, and five voices with organ, Op. 13 (Venice: Alessandro Vincenti), also includes arias for bass solo
- Pietro Pace - The eleventh book of motets..., Op. 25 (Rome, Giovanni Battista Robletti), prepared posthumously by his son, Benedetto Pace
- Giovanni Picchi – Canzoni da sonar con ogni sorte d'istromenti for two, three, four, six, and eight voices with basso continuo (Venice: Alessandro Vincenti)
- Hieronymus Praetorius – Cantiones novae officiosae for five, six, seven, eight, ten, and fifteen voices, Op. 5 (Hamburg: Michael Hering)

== Classical music ==
- Alessandro Grandi – O quam tu pulchra es, a concertato motet

== Opera ==
- Francesca Caccini – La liberazione di Ruggiero

== Births ==
- December 24 – Johann Rudolph Ahle, organist and composer (d. 1673)

== Deaths ==
- January 7 – Ruggiero Giovannelli, Italian composer (born c.1560)
- June 5 – Orlando Gibbons, composer (born 1583)
- July 5 – Cornelis Verdonck, composer (born 1563)
- October 1 – Hendrik Speuy, organist and composer (born c.1575)
- November 3 – Adam Gumpelzhaimer, composer and music theorist (born 1559)
- date unknown – Muthu Thandavar, Carnatic composer (born 1525)
- probable – Paul Peuerl, organist, organ builder and composer (born 1570)
