= 1631 in music =

List of years in music	(table)
- … 1621; 1622; 1623; 1624; 1625; 1626; 1627; 1628; 1629; 1630; 1631; 1632; 1633; 1634; 1635; 1636; 1637; 1638; 1639; 1640; 1641 …
- Art; Archaeology; Architecture; Literature; Music; Philosophy; Science; +...

The year 1631 in music involved some significant events.

== Events ==
- January 9 – The masque Love's Triumph Through Callipolis, written by Ben Jonson and designed by Inigo Jones, is performed at Whitehall Palace; the work features music by Nicholas Lanier.
- In Venice, the plague outbreak of 1629–1631, after reducing the population by one third, comes to an end. Claudio Monteverdi writes a mass for a service of thanksgiving, held at St Mark's Basilica.
- Marco Marazzoli is one of several musicians who accompany Cardinal Antonio Barberini on a visit to Urbino.
- Earliest known bentside spinet, made by Hieronymus de Zentis.

== Publications ==
- Christoph Demantius – Deutsche Passion, nach dem Evangelisten S. Iohanne for six voices (Freiberg: Georg Hoffmann)
- Melchior Franck
  - Dulces mundani exilii deliciae for two, three, four, five, six, seven, and eight voices with basso continuo (Nuremberg: Wolfgang Endter), a collection of sacred songs
  - Psalmodia sacra for four and five voices (Nuremberg: Wolfgang Endter), a collection of motets
  - Hertzlicher Seufftzer der Christlichen Kirchen in Deutschland for four voices (Coburg: Kaspar Bertsch), a motet of national consolation, setting Psalm 122
- Giovanni Girolamo Kapsberger
  - Missa Urbanae, vol. 1 (Rome: Paolo Masotti)
  - Litaniae Deiparae Virginis, vol. 1 (Rome: Paolo Masotti)
- Filipe de Magalhães – Book of Masses (Lisbon: Lourenço Craesbeeck)
- Thomas Morley – an edition of his canzonets.
- Cornelis Padbrué – Kusjes (collection of madrigals)
- Giovanni Palazzotto e Tagliavia — Sacre canzoni musicali..., book three (Messina: Pietro Brea)

== Classical music ==
- Claudio Monteverdi – Mass of Thanksgiving

== Opera ==
- Stefano Landi – Il Sant'Alessio (with libretto by Giulio Rospigliosi): Palazzo Barberini alle Quattro Fontane, 18 February 1632.

== Births ==
- October – Pierre Beauchamp, choreographer, dancer and composer (died 1705)
- October 3 – Sebastian Anton Scherer, composer (died 1712)

== Deaths ==
- January 3 – Michelagnolo Galilei, lutenist and composer (born 1575)
- March 24 – Philipp Dulichius, composer (born 1562)
- August 6 – Juan Blas de Castro, singer and composer (born 1561)
- date unknown – Christoph Straus, German choral composer (born 1575)
