= 1633 in music =

List of years in music	(table)
- … 1623; 1624; 1625; 1626; 1627; 1628; 1629; 1630; 1631; 1632; 1633; 1634; 1635; 1636; 1637; 1638; 1639; 1640; 1641; 1642; 1643 …
- Art; Archaeology; Architecture; Literature; Music; Philosophy; Science; +...

The year 1633 in music involved some significant events.

== Events ==
- Heinrich Schütz travels to Denmark to be the interim choirmaster for King Christian IV.

== Publications ==
- Ignazio Donati – Second book of masses da capella for four and five voices, Op. 12 (Venice: Alessandro Vincenti)
- Benedetto Ferrari – Musiche varier a voce sola, volume 1, published in Venice
- Melchior Franck – Der schöne trostreiche Spruch, Röm. 8. Ist Gott für uns, wer mag wider uns seyn? for four voices (Coburg: Johann Forckel), a funeral motet
- Francesco Pasquali – Varie musiche..., Op. 6 (Orvieto: Giovanni Battista Robletti)

== Classical music ==
- Antonio Maria Abbatini – Il Pianto di Rodomonte, a dramatic cantata

== Opera ==
- Michelangelo Rossi – Erminia sul Giordano (first performed in Rome)

== Births ==
- September 6 – Sebastian Knüpfer, German composer (died 1676)
- date unknown – Jean-Nicolas Geoffroy, harpsichordist and organist (died 1694)

== Deaths ==
- August 12 – Jacopo Peri, Italian composer and singer (born 1561)
- October 24 – Jean Titelouze, French composer, poet and organist (born c. 1562/3)
