= 1619 in music =

The year 1619 in music involved some significant events.

== Events ==
- none listed

== Publications ==
- Paolo Agostini – Salmi della Madonna, Magnificat a 3. voci, hinno Ave Maris Stella, antifone a una 2. & 3. voci, et motetti tutti concertati..., book 1 (Rome: Luca Antonio Soldi)
- Gregorio Allegri – Second book of concertini for two, three, and four voices (Rome: Luca Antonio Soldi)
- Giovanni Francesco Anerio
  - Teatro armonico spirituale di madrigali (Rome: Giovanni Battista Robletti), a collection of oratorios
  - La bella Clori armonica (Rome: Luca Antonio Soldi), a collection of arias, canzonettas, and madrigals
  - Ghirlanda di sacre rose (A Garland of sacred roses) (Rome: Luca Antonio Soldi), a collection of motets for five voices
- Adriano Banchieri – Sacra armonia for four voices, Op. 41 (Venice: Gardano)
- Valerio Bona – Otto ordini di letanie della Madonna che si cantano ogni sabbato nella Santa Casa di Loreto for two choirs (Venice: Giacomo Vincenti)
- Antonio Brunelli – 3 Requiem masses for four and seven voices, Op. 14 (Venice: Giacomo Vincenti), also includes Improperia for six voices and a Miserere for four voices
- Sulpitia Cesis – Motetti Spirituale for eight voices (Modena: Giuliano Cassiani)
- Antonio Cifra
  - First book of masses (Rome: Luca Antonio Soldi)
  - Motecta ex sacris cantionibus for two, three, and four voices (Rome: Luca Antonio Soldi)
  - First and second books of Ricercari e canzoni franzese (Rome: Luca Antonio Soldi)
- Christoph Demantius
  - Triades Sionae for five, six, seven, and eight voices (Freiberg: Melchior Hoffmann), a collection of introits, masses, and sequences
  - Epithalamion for six voices (Freiberg: Georg Hoffmann), written for the wedding of Augustus Pragern and Martha Lincken
  - Der Herrlichste Brautschmuck for eight voices (Freiberg: Georg Hoffmann), an epithalamium setting text from Chapter Four of the Song of Songs
  - Manet immutabile fatum for eight voices (Freiberg: Georg Hoffmann), an epithalamium
  - Saccharatum conjugiale for eight voices (Freiberg: Georg Hoffmann), an epithalamium setting text from Chapter Twenty-Six of the Book of Sirach
- Melchior Franck
  - Spanneues lustiges Quodlibet for four voices (Coburg: Kaspar Bertsch), a collection of quodlibets
  - Neues Hochzeitgesang Auß dem 5. Capitel der Sprüche Salomonis for five voices (Coburg: Andreas Forckel), a wedding motet
  - Newes HochzeitGesang Auß den schönen Trostreichen Worten Ose 2. Ich wil mich mit dir verloben in Ewigkeit, for five voices (Coburg: Kaspar Bertsch), a wedding motet
  - Neues Grabgesang (Weil ich nun soll von dannen) for four voices (Coburg: Kaspar Bertsch), a funeral motet
- Hans Leo Hassler – Litaney teütsch (German Litany) for seven voices (Nuremberg: Balthasar Scherff), published posthumously
- Giovanni Girolamo Kapsberger
  - Second book of villanelle for one, two, and three voices with guitar (Rome: Giovanni Battista Robletti)
  - Third book of villanelle for one, two, and three voices with accompaniment (Rome)
- Carlo Milanuzzi
  - Sacri rosarum flores for two, three, and four voices, Op. 1 (Venice: Giacomo Vincenti), a collection of motets
  - First book of Vespers psalms for two voices and organ, Op. 2 (Venice: Giacomo Vincenti)
- Claudio Monteverdi – Concerto. Settimo libro di madrigali a 1.2.3.4. sei voci, con altri generi de canti di Claudio Monteverde Maestro di Capella della Serenissima Republica (Seventh Book of madrigals for five voices) (Venice: Bartolomeo Magni for Gardano)
- Pietro Pace
  - Motetti a quatro, a cinque et a sei voci..., Op. 18 (Venice: Giacomo Vincenti)
  - The eighth book of motets..., Op. 19 (Venice: Giacomo Vincenti)
  - Psalms for eight voices..., Op. 20 (Venice: Alessandro Vincenti)
  - The ninth book of motets..., Op. 21 (Venice: Alessandro Vincenti)
- Claudio Pari – Il lamento d'Ariana, fourth book of madrigals for five voices (Palermo: Giovanni Battista Maringo)
- Georg Patermann – Votum nuptiale, for the wedding of Conrad and Catharina Huswedel (Rostock: Joachim Pedanus)
- Serafino Patta – Psalmi integri cum duobus canticis Beatae Mariae Virginis as Vesperas totius anni, for five voices and organ (Venice: Alessandro Gardano)
- Michael Praetorius – Syntagma Musicum, part 3
- Heinrich Schütz – Psalmen Davids (Psalms of David)
- Thomas Vautor – The First Set: ... Apt for Vyols or Voyces

== Opera ==
- none listed

== Births ==
- February 28 – Giuseppe Felice Tosi, singer, organist and composer (d. c.1693)
- August 6 – Barbara Strozzi, Italian singer and composer (d. 1677)
- date unknown – Johann Rosenmüller, German composer (d. 1684)
- probable
  - Anthoni van Noordt, Dutch organist and composer (d. 1675)
  - Juan García de Zéspedes, composer, singer, viol player and teacher

== Deaths ==
- January 29 – Daniel Bacheler, English lutenist and composer (born 1572)
- October 23 – Nicholas Yonge, singer and publisher (born c.1560)
- date unknown – Giacomo Vincenti, Venetian music printer
