= 1622 in music =

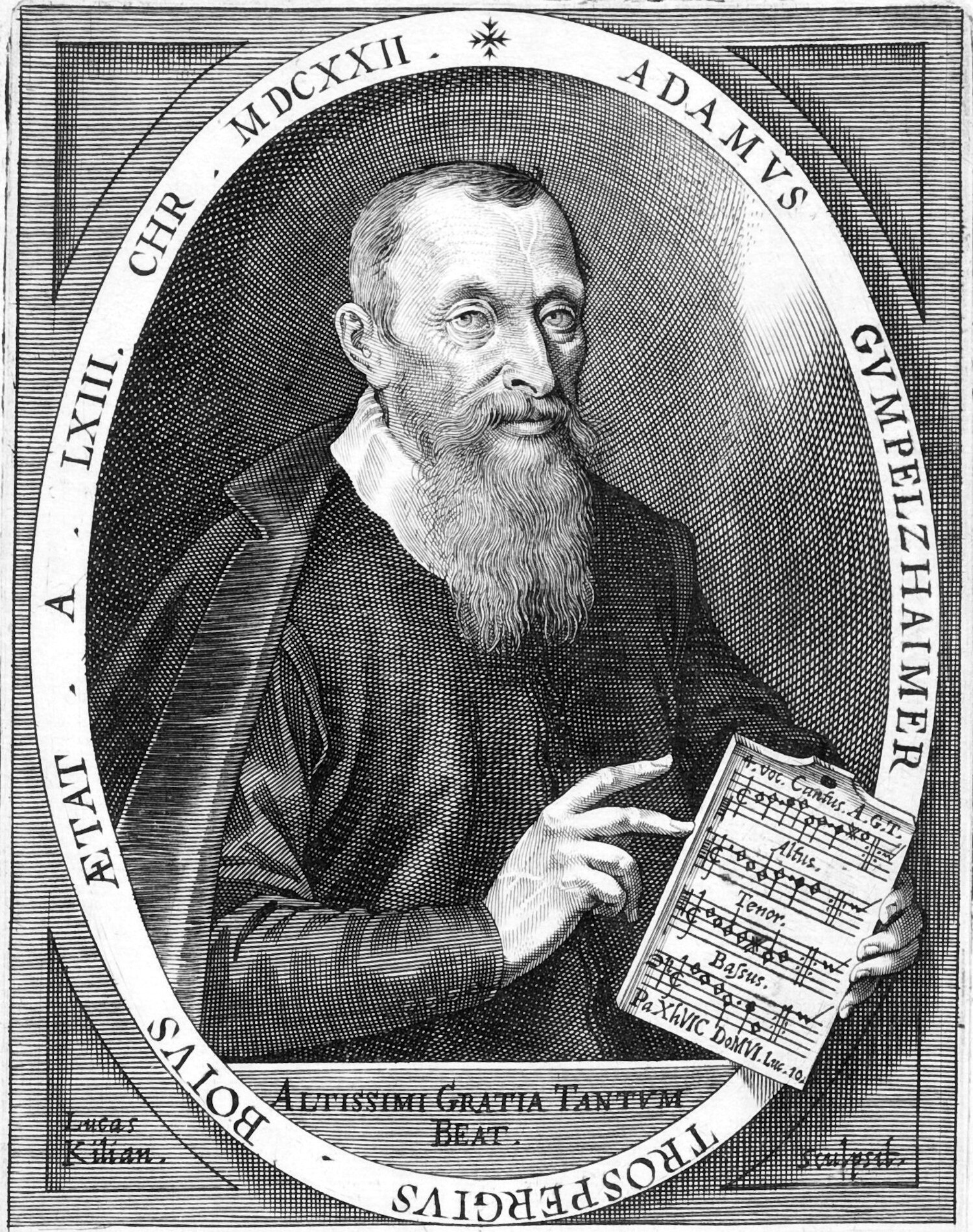
A print of Gumpelzhaimer in 1622

The year 1622 in music involved some significant events.

== Events ==
- January 6 (probable) – The Masque of Augurs, written by Ben Jonson and designed by Inigo Jones, is performed at Whitehall Palace, probably to celebrate Twelfth Night. The masque features music by Alfonso Ferrabosco the younger and Nicholas Lanier (but only one song by Lanier will survive).
- Lutenist Jacques Gaultier begins his correspondence with composer Constantijn Huygens.

== Classical music ==
- Adriano Banchieri – Vivezze di flora e primavera, Cantatas for five voices and a harpsichord or theorbo, Op. 46 (Venice: Bartolomeo Magni)
- Giacinto Bondioli
  - Salmi Intieri brevemente Concertati a Capella e con l’Organo, Op. 4 (Venice: Bartolomeo Magni for Gardano)
  - Soavi fiori colti nel ameno giardino (Sweet flowers cultivated in the pleasant garden), Op. 5 (Venice: Bartolomeo Magni), a collection of sacred music for two voices and continuo
- Christoph Demantius
  - Deliciae & Divitiae Conjugales, Ehestandes Lust und Reichthumb (Wer eine Haußfrau hat, der bringt sein Gut) for six voices (Freiberg: Georg Hoffmann), an epithalamium for the wedding of Matthaeus Heinrich and Justitia
  - Dialogus sponsi et sponsae cum voto Nuptiali for six voices (Freiberg: Georg Hoffmann), an epithalamium for the wedding of Johann Caspar and Victoria on May 6
- Ignazio Donati – Masses for four, five, and six voices (Venice: Alessandro Vincenti)
- Giacomo Finetti – Corona Mariae (Mary's Crown) for four voices, book five (Venice: Bartolomeo Magni for Gardano), a collection of motets
- Melchior Franck
  - Laudes Dei vespertinae, parts one to four, for four, five, six, and eight voices (Coburg: Andreas Forckel for Salomon Gruner), a collection of Magnificats in all eight tones
  - Musicalischer Grillenvertreiber for four voices (Coburg: Andreas Forckel for Salomon Gruner), a collection of quodlibets, both previously published and original
  - Der schöne Trostspruch Johannis 3. Sic Deus dilexit mundum, &c. for five voices (Coburg: Andreas Forckel), a funeral motet
  - Epicedium, Ausz den trostreichen Worten desz H. Apostels Pauli in der 2. Timoth. 4. for six voices (Coburg: Andreas Forckel), a motet for the funeral of Duke Frederick of Saxe-Weimar
- Marco da Gagliano – Second book of motets for one to six voices (Venice: Bartolomeo Magni for Gardano)
- Vinko Jelić – Parnassia militia for one, two, three, and four voices or instruments with organ bass, Op. 1 (Strasbourg: Paul Lederz)
- Carlo Milanuzzi
  - Litanie della Beata Vergine for four and eight voices with basso continuo, Op. 5 (Venice: Alessandro Vincenti)
  - Armonia sacra for five voices and organ bass, Op. 6 (Venice: Alessandro Vincenti)
  - First book of ariose vaghezze for solo voice and accompaniment, Op. 7 (Venice: Bartolomeo Magni)
  - Second book of ariose vaghezze for solo voices and accompaniment, Op. 8 (Venice: Alessandro Vincenti)
- Pomponio Nenna – Sacrae hebdomadae responsoria for five voices with organ bass (Rome: Giovanni Battista Robletti), published posthumously
- Salamone Rossi – Il quarto libro de varie sonate, sinfonie, gagliarde, branle, e corrente per sonar due violini, et un chittarone o altro stromento simile
- Thomas Tomkins – Songs Of 3. 4. 5. and 6. parts

== Opera ==
- Francesca Caccini – Il martirio di Sant'Agata (The martyrdom of Saint Agata)

== Births ==
- date unknown
  - James Clifford, churchman and musician (died 1698)
  - Gaspar de Verlit, composer (died 1682)
  - Alba Trissina, Italian composer.

== Deaths ==
- January 1 – Jakob Hassler, composer (born 1569)
- February 11 – Alfonso Fontanelli, composer and writer (born 1557)
- April 15 – Pietro Pace, composer (born 1559)
- October 26 – Sebastián de Vivanco, priest and composer (born c.1551)
- November – Giovanni Battista Grillo, organist and composer
- date unknown – Giovanni Paolo Cima, organist and composer (born c. 1570)
