= 1618 in music =

The year 1618 in music involved some significant events.

== Events ==
- May 23 – Beginning of the Thirty Years' War (1618–1648), which will disrupt German musical establishments, and will affect the nature of the music composed by those who endured the widespread devastation, famine, and disease of this period.
- The first Zildjian cymbals are made.
- Robert Ballard becomes lutenist and composer at the court of King Louis XIII of France.
- Michael East is choirmaster at Lichfield Cathedral.

== Publications ==
- Sebastián Aguilera de Heredia – Magnificats for four, five, six, and eight voices (Zaragoza: Petrus Cabarte)
- Gregorio Allegri – Concerti, vol. 1
- Giovanni Francesco Anerio – Fifth book of sacrarum cantionum (Rome: Giovanni Battista Robletti)
- Francesca Caccini – First book of music for one and two voices (Florence: Zanobi Pignoni)
- Johannes Vodnianus Campanus – Sacrarum odarum libri duo (Two books of sacred odes) for four voices (Prague: Johann Schönfeld), book one contains psalms while book two contains hymns
- Antonio Cifra – Second book of Scherzi sacri for one, two, three, and four voices, Op. 25 (Rome: Giovanni Battista Robletti)
- Christoph Demantius
  - Hochzeitlicher Davidischer Ehe-Segen (Wol dem, der den Herren fürchtet) for eight voices (Freiberg: Georg Hoffmann), an epithalamium for the wedding of Heinrich Schönleben and Magdalena Tannenberg on October 20
  - Glückseliger Ehe Schatz (Jauchzet dem Herren alle Welt) for eight voices (Freiberg: Georg Hoffmann), an epithalamium for the wedding of Johannes Reger and Susanna Reisiger on November 3
  - Euredikos armonikos (Gaudete filiae Jerusalem) for eight voices (Freiberg: Georg Hoffmann), an epithalamium for the wedding of Georg Schöller and Maria Caspar Dachsell
  - Te Deum laudamus for six voices (Freiberg: Georg Hoffmann), written for the funeral of Michael Rothen
- Richard Dering – Cantica sacra ad melodiam madrigalium for six voices with basso continuo (Antwerp: Pierre Phalèse)
- René Descartes – Compendium Musicae
- Ignazio Donati
  - Concerti ecclesiastici for two, three, four, and five voices (Venice: Giacomo Vincenti)
  - Concerti ecclesiastici for one, two, three, four, and five voices, Op. 5 (Venice: Giacomo Vincenti)
  - Motetti concertati for five and six voices, Op. 6 (Venice: Giacomo Vincenti)
- Michael East – The Fourth Set Of Bookes ... to 4. 5. and 6. Parts: Apt for Viols and Voyces
- Melchior Franck
  - Newes Hochzeitgesang ausz dem 2. Capitel deß Hohenlieds Salomonis for five voices (Coburg: Justus Hauck), a wedding motet
  - Newes Hochzeit Gesang ausz dem 8. Capitel deß Hohen Lieds Salomonis for five voices (Coburg: Justus Hauck), a wedding motet
  - Psalm 122 for eight voices in two choirs (Coburg: Justus Hauck)
  - Zwey newe HochzeitGesäng for eight voices in two choirs (Coburg: Kaspar Bertsch)
- Pierre Guédron – Fourth book of airs de cours for four and five voices (Paris: Pierre Ballard)
- Sigismondo d'India – Third book of Le Musiche for one and two voices (Milan: Filippo Lomazzo)
- Giovanni Bernardino Nanino – Fourth book of motets for one, two, three, four, and five voices with organ bass (Rome: Giovanni Battista Robletti)
- Pomponio Nenna – Eighth book of madrigals for five voices (Rome: Giovanni Battista Robletti)
- Pietro Pace – The sixth book of motets..., Op. 16 (Venice: Giacomo Vincenti)
- Francesco Pasquali
  - Cantiones..., Op. 3 (Rome: Giovanni Battista Robletti)
  - Second book of madrigals, Op. 4 (Venice: Giacomo Vincenti)
- Isaac Posch – Musikalische Ehrenfreudt for four voices (Regensburg: Matthias Mylius for Isaac Posch), a collection of dance music
- Hieronymus Praetorius – Cantiones variae for five, six, seven, eight, ten, twelve, fourteen, and twenty voices, Op. 4 (Hamburg: Heinrich Carstens)
- Michael Praetorius – De Organographia
- Johann Hermann Schein – Opella nova (Little new works), volume 1, a collection of sacred concertos

== Opera ==
- Claudio Monteverdi – Andromeda (lost)

== Births ==
- date unknown
  - Solomon Eccles, composer (died 1683)
  - Pierre Robert, composer (died 1699)

== Deaths ==
- December 10 – Giulio Caccini, Italian composer (born 1551)
- December 12 – Pedro de Cristo, composer (born c.1550)
