= 1620 in music =

== Popular music ==
- perhaps around this time "The Ballad of Chevy Chase" (second version)

== Publications ==
- Agostino Agazzari – Stille soavi di celeste aurora..., Op. 19 (Venice: Bartolomeo Magni for Gardano), a collection of madrigals
- Giovanni Francesco Anerio – Rime sacre concertate (Rome: Giovanni Battista Robletti)
- Adriano Banchieri – First book of masses and motets arranged for one bass and two tenor voices with organ, Op. 42 (Venice: Alessandro Vincenti)
- Aurelio Bonelli – Masses and motets for four voices (Venice: Alessandro Vincenti)
- Antonio Cifra
  - Psalmi Sacrique Concentus for eight voices (Assisi: Giacomo Salvi)
  - Motets for four voices (Rome: Giovanni Battista Robletti)
- Manuel Rodrigues Coelho – Flores de musica pera o instrumento de tecla & harpa (Lisbon: Pedro Craesbeck), the earliest keyboard music printed in Portugal
- Christoph Demantius
  - Threnodiae for four, five, and six voices (Freiberg: Georg Hoffmann), a collection of funeral music
  - Hochzeitliche Concert-Motet for eight voices (Freiberg: Georg Hoffmann), an epithalamium for the wedding of Augustus von Schönberg and Ursula Haubold on March 6
  - Frommer Eheleut Hochzeit Geschenck for eight voices (Freiberg Georg Hoffmann), an epithalamium for the wedding of Johann Hassen and Susanna Horn on May 30
- Richard Dering
  - Canzonettas for four voice with basso continuo (Antwerp: Pierre Phalèse)
  - Canzonettas for three voices with basso continuo (Antwerp: Pierre Phalèse)
- Melchior Franck
  - Neues Hochzeitgesang (Gott wird die Braut erhaschen) auss dem alten Christlichen Gesang for five voices (Coburg: Kaspar Bertsch), a wedding motet
  - Schöner trostreicher Text ausz dem 15. Capittel Syrachs for six voices (Coburg: Andreas Forckel), a wedding motet
- Michelagnolo Galilei – Il primo libro d'intavolatura di liuto (Munich)
- Pierre Guédron – Fifth book of airs de cours for four and five voices (Paris: Pierre Ballard)
- Scipione Lacorcia – Third book of madrigals for five voices (Naples: Costantino Vitale)
- Ivan Lukačić – Sacrae cantiones for one, two, three, four, and five voices (Venice: Gardano), a collection of motets
- Carlo Milanuzzi – Aurea Corona di scherzi poetici scelti da la Ghirlanda dell' Aurora for two, three, and four voices with basso continuo, Op. 3 (Venice: Alessandro Vincenti)
- Giovanni Bernardino Nanino
  - Venite exsultemus Domino for three voices and organ bass (Assisi: Giacomo Salvi)
  - Salmi vespertini for four voices (Rome: Giovanni Battista Robletti)
- Giovanni Palazzotto e Tagliavia — Second book of madrigals to five voices (Palermo: Giovanni Battista Maringo)
- Martin Peerson – Private musicke, or the first booke of ayres and dialogues, contayning songs of 4. 5. and 6. parts (London: Thomas Snodham)

== Births ==
- January 9 – Johann Weichmann, composer (d. 1652)
- September 6 – Isabella Leonarda, composer (d. 1704)
- probable – Adam Drese, bass viol player and composer (d. 1701)

== Deaths ==
- March 1 – Thomas Campion, composer and poet (born 1567)
- March 25 – Johannes Nucius, composer and music theorist (born c. 1556)
- August 2 – Carolus Luython, composer (born 1557)
- date unknown
  - Thomas Adams, music publisher (born c. 1566)
  - Joachim van den Hove, composer (born c.1567)
- probable – Girolamo Belli, composer and music teacher (born 1552)
