= 1623 in music =

The year 1623 in music involved some significant events.

== Events ==
- Drum cymbals are first made commercially by the predecessor of the Avedis Zildjian Company at Constantinople in Ottoman Turkey. Zildjian /ˈzɪldʒiən/ cymbals were created in 1618 by Avedis Zildjian, an alchemist who was looking for a way to turn base metal into gold; he created an alloy combining tin, copper, and silver into a sheet of metal that could make musical sounds without shattering. Avedis was given the name of Zildjian (Zilciyân) by the Sultan Osman II[3] (from the Turkish word zil cymbal, dji maker/seller, -ian a common suffix used in Armenian last names) and begins an industry in this year, the details of whose main product remain secret for generations as it becomes family tradition that only the company's heirs would know the manufacturing process. The company will still be operating, from Massachusetts, in the 21st century.

== Publications ==
- Antonio Cifra – Sixth book of madrigals for five voices with basso continuo (Rome: Luca Antonio Soldi)
- Ignazio Donati – Salmi boscarecci (Pastoral psalms) for six voices plus a six-voice ripieno (Venice: Alessandro Vincenti), also includes a mass
- Melchior Franck
  - Gemmulæ Evangeliorum Musicae for four voices (Coburg: Andreas Forckel), settings of gospel texts for the whole year
  - Neues liebliches Musicalisches Lustgärtlein for five, six, and eight voices or instruments (Coburg: Andreas Forckel for Salomon Gruner), a collection of secular songs
  - Viertzig Neue Deutzsche lustige Musicalische Täntze for four, five, and six voices or instruments (Coburg: Salomon Gruner), a collection of songs and dances
  - Newes fröliches Hochzeitgesang Auß dem 4. Capitel deß Hohenlieds Salomonis for five voices (Coburg: Kaspar Bertsch), a wedding motet
  - Newes Fröliches Hochzeitgesang Auß dem Ersten Capittel deß Hohenlieds Salomonis for six voices (Coburg: Andreas Forckel), a wedding motet
  - Neues Christliches Grabgesänglein (Hilff Helffer hilff) for four voices (Coburg: Kaspar Bertsch), a funeral motet
- Orlando Gibbons – The Hymns and Songs of the Church (London: George Wither)
- Sigismondo d'India – Fifth book of le musiche for solo voice and accompaniment (Venice: Alessandro Vincenti)
- Giovanni Girolamo Kapsberger
  - Second book of arias (Rome: Luca Antonio Soldi)
  - Fourth book of villanelle for one and more voices with guitar (Rome: Luca Antonio Soldi)
- Carlo Milanuzzi – Third book of ariose vaghezze for solo voice and accompaniment, Op. 9 (Venice: Alessandro Vincenti)
- Claudio Monteverdi – Lamento d'Arianna (Venice: Bartolomeo Magni), the only surviving excerpt from his opera, L'Arianna
- Peter Philips – Litaniae Beatae Mariae Virginis, in ecclesia Loretana cani solitae for four, five, six, eight, and nine voices with organ bass (Antwerp: Pierre Phalèse)
- Alessandro Piccinini – Intavolatura di liuto, et di chitarrone, Libro Primo (Bologna: the heirs of Giovanni Paolo Moscatelli)
- Isaac Posch – Harmonia Concertans for one, two, three, and four voices or instruments with organ bass (Nuremberg: Simon Halbmayer)

== Classical music ==
- Salamone Rossi – Hebrew: השירים אשר לשלמה, romanized: Ha-shirim asher l'Shlomo, lit. 'The Songs of Solomon', a collection of Jewish liturgical music

== Births ==
- July 6 – Jacopo Melani, violinist and composer (died 1676)
- August 5 – Antonio Cesti, composer (died 1669)
- date unknown – Johann Heinrich Schmelzer, violinist and composer (died 1688)
- probable – Dietrich Becker, violinist and composer (died c.1679)

== Deaths ==
- January/February – Mogens Pedersøn, instrumentalist and composer (born c.1583)
- May 4 – Asprilio Pacelli, composer (born 1570)
- May 5 – Philip Rosseter, musician and composer (born 1567/8)
- June 11 – Gutierre Fernández, South American composer and priest of Spanish birth (born c. 1547)
- July 4 – William Byrd, composer (born 1543)
- November 30 – Thomas Weelkes, English composer (born 1576)
- date unknown
  - Giovanni Bernardino Nanino, composer, teacher and singing master (born c.1560)
  - Tulsidas, Hindu philosopher, composer, and poet (born 1532)
