= 1621 in music =

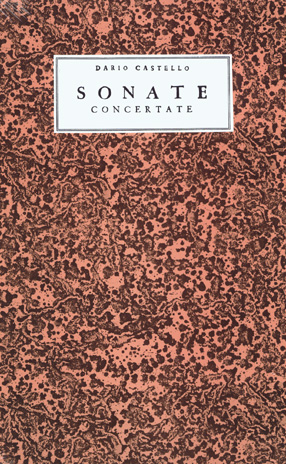
Cover of a modern facsimile edition of Dario Castello's Sonate concertate, first published in 1621.

The year 1621 in music involved some significant events.

== Events ==
- January 6 – Andrea Salvadori's poem, "Donne musiche parlano dall'Inferno" (Women musicians speak from Hell) is performed at the court's Epiphany celebrations in 1621.
- August 3 – The masque The Gypsies Metamorphosed, written by Ben Jonson and designed by Inigo Jones, is performed for the first time; it is repeated twice more in August and September. The masque features the music of Nicholas Lanier.
- The San Bartolomeo Theater, the first opera house, opens in Naples.

== Publications ==
- Gregor Aichinger – Corolla eucharistica, ex variis flosculis et gemmulis pretiosis musicarum sacrarum (A Little Eucharistic Crown, woven from various little flowers and precious little gems of sacred music) (Augsburg: Johann Praetorius)
- Gregorio Allegri – Motets for two, three, four, five, and six voices (Rome: Luca Antonio Soldi)
- Giovanni Francesco Anerio – I lieti scherzi (Rome: Giovanni Battista Robletti), a collection of arias, villanellas, and madrigals
- William Brade – Newe lustige Volten, Couranten, Balletten, Padoanen, Galliarden, Masqueraden, auch allerley arth Newer Frantzösischer Täntze for five instruments (Berlin: Martin Guth), a collection of dance music
- Antonio Cifra
  - Second book of masses (Rome: Luca Antonio Soldi)
  - Second book Psalmorum, sacrorumque concentuum for eight voices (Rome: Luca Antonio Soldi)
  - Fifth book of madrigals for five voices (Rome: Luca Antonio Soldi)
- Christoph Demantius
  - Psalm 127 for eight voices (Freiberg: Georg Hoffmann), an epithalamium for the wedding of Georg von Walwitz and Catharina-Sophia von Löwen on June 26
  - Encomium Amoris, Ehrenpreyß der Liebe for eight voices (Freiberg: Georg Hoffmann), an epithalamium for the wedding of David Fritsche and Sabina Lincken on September 18
  - Ehrenpreyß eines tugendsamen Weibes (Freiberg: Georg Hoffmann), an epithalamium for the wedding of Caspar Engels and Maria Schneider
  - Hochzeit Gesang for six voices (Freiberg: Georg Hoffmann), an epithalamium for the wedding of Joachim Ludwig von Penzelin and Maria Schmieden
- Giacomo Finetti – Concerti ecclesiastici for two, three, and four voices with organ bass (Antwerp: Pierre Phalèse)
- Melchior Franck
  - Neues Teutsches Musicalisches Fröliches Convivium for four, five, and six voices or instruments (Coburg: Andreas Forckel for Salomon Gruner), a collection of secular partsongs
  - Herzlich lieb hab' ich dich o Herr for eight voices (Coburg: Andreas Forckel), a funeral motet
- Sigismondo d'India
  - Le musiche e balli for four voices and basso continuo (Venice: Alessandro Vincento), a collection of balletti
  - Fourth book of le musiche for one and two voices with accompaniment (Venice: Alessandro Vincenti)
- Duarte Lobo – Book of Masses for four, five, six, and eight voices (Antwerp: Plantin)
- Isaac Posch – Musikalische Tafelfreudt for four and five voices (Nuremberg: Abraham Wagenmann for Isaac Posch), a collection of dance music
- Thomas Ravenscroft – The Whole Booke of Psalmes

== Opera ==
- Pietro Pace – L'Ilarcosmo

== Births ==
- March 28 – Heinrich Schwemmer, German music teacher and composer (died 1696)
- probable
  - Albertus Bryne, English composer and organist (died 1668)
  - Matthew Locke, English composer and theorist (died 1677)

== Deaths ==
- February 15 – Michael Praetorius, composer and theorist (born 1571)
- March 28 – Ottavio Rinuccini, librettist (born 1562)
- June 21 – Kryštof Harant, nobleman, traveller, writer and composer (born 1564) (executed)
- August 23 – Antonio Il Verso, composer (born 1565)
- October 16 – Jan Pieterszoon Sweelinck, composer, organist and teacher (born 1562)
- November 30 – Francesco Rasi, Italian singer and composer (born 1574)
- date unknown
  - Ippolito Fiorini, lutenist and composer (born 1549)
  - Edmund Hooper, organist (born c.1553)
  - Francesco Soriano, composer (born c.1548)
