= Giacomo Vincenti =

Italian bookseller

Giacomo Vincenti (died 1619) was an Italian bookseller and music printer from Venice. He also spelled his name Vincenci and Vincenzi. He started printing in 1583. His partner was Ricciardo Amadino, and between 1583 and 1586 they printed about twenty books a year, mostly editions of music. Although their official partnership ended in 1586 they continued to use the same typefaces, collaborated on some editions, and held joint copyrights in others. In 1587, Vincenti published Luca Marenzio's Fourth Book of Madrigals, with the composer's dedication.

Vincenti did have competition, including the firms of Gardano, Scotto and Amadino; however his productions were more wide-ranging. He did not publish many non-musical works. He was one of the first music publishers to publish a trade list, which frequently included prices. Vincenti used the moveable type technique of printing, however, his editions are not regarded as particularly beautiful, although they tend to be accurate.

Vincenti published the works of most of the major north Italian composers, including:

- Giovanni Croce (55 editions)
- Lodovico Grossi da Viadana (53)
- Luca Marenzio
- Giammateo Asola
- Adriano Banchieri (both his compositions and treatises)
- Stefano Bernardi
- Antonio Cifra
- Alessandro Grandi
- Felice Anerio
- Girolamo Diruta (and treatises)
- Ignazio Donati
- Ruggiero Giovannelli
- Giulio Caccini (reprint of Le nuove musiche and Euridice)

As well as musical treatises by people such as:

- Giovanni Bassano
- Riccardo Rognoni
- Giovanni Battista Bovicelli
- Giovanni Battista Spadi
- Bernardino Bottazzi
- Giovanni Artusi (including L’Artusi, overo Delle imperfettioni della moderna musica, which was important in the debate between Artusi and Claudio Monteverdi)
- Romano Micheli
