= 1626 in music =

The year 1626 in music involved some significant events.

== Events ==
- Tarquinio Merula returns to Cremona.
- Paolo Agostino succeeds Vincenzo Ugolini as conductor of the pope's orchestra in St. Peter's Basilica.

== Bands formed ==
- Les Vingt-quatre Violons du Roi

== Publications ==
=== Classical music ===
- Paolo Agostino – Second book of masses, for four voices
- Gregor Aichinger – Flores musici ad mensam SS. convivii... (Augsburg: Johann Ulrich Schönigk)
- Adriano Banchieri – Il Virtuoso Ritrovo Academico Del Dissonante, publicamente praticato con variati Concerti Musicali A 1. 2. 3. 4. 5. Voci ò Stromenti, nell'Academia di Filomusi, Op. 49 (Venice: Bartolomeo Magni)
- Antonio Brunelli – Fioretti spirituali for one, two, three, four, and five voices, Op. 15 (Venice: Bartolomeo Magni)
- Giovanni Battista Buonamente – Il quarto libro de varie de sonate, sinfonie, gagliarde, corrente, e brandi per sonar con due violini & un basso di viola, published in Venice
- Camillo Cortellini – Messe concertate for eight voices (Venice: Alessandro Vicenti)
- Carlo Farina – Libro delle pavane, gagliarde, brand: mascharata, aria franzesa, volte, balletti, sonate, canzone
- Melchior Franck
  - Hertzlicher Wuntsch auff vorgenommene Reyse glücklichen Fortgang und fröliche Wiederkunfft auch zu einem glückseligen Friedund Frewdenreichen lieben Newen Jahr for five voices (Coburg: Johann Forckel), a New Year's motet
  - Newes Christliches HochzeitGesang Auß dem XXV. Capitel Syrachs for five voices (Coburg: Kaspar Bertsch), a wedding motet
  - Der XCI. Psalm Davids for six voices (Coburg: Kaspar Bertsch), a birthday motet
  - Buszgesang von Ninive (Wach auff vom tiefen Schlaf der Sünden) for eight voices (Coburg: Johann Forckel for Friedrich Gruner)
  - Assaphus Bernhardinus lingua binus voce trinus for three voices (Nuremberg: Simon Halbmayer), a motet in Latin and German
- Giovanni Girolamo Kapsberger – Libro terzo d'intavolatura di chitarrone (Rome: M. Privii)
- Giovanni Pasta – Affetti d'Erato. Madrigali in concerto..., book 1 (Venice: Alessandro Vincenti)
- Johann Hermann Schein – Opella nova (Little new works), volume 2, a collection of sacred concertos

=== Theory and Practice ===
- Francisco Correa de Arauxo – Facultad organica (Alcala: Antonio Arnau), a book on the theory and practice of organ playing

== Opera ==
- Domenico Mazzochi – La catena d'Adone

== Births ==
- August 12 (baptized) – Giovanni Legrenzi, Italian composer (died 1690)
- date unknown
  - Wolfgang Carl Briegel, organist and composer (died 1712)
  - Marusia Churai, composer, poet and singer (died 1689)
- probable – Louis Couperin, French harpsichordist and composer (died 1661)

== Deaths ==
- February 20 – John Dowland, composer and lutenist (born 1563)
- May 17 – Joan Pau Pujol, organist and composer (born 1570)
- June – Samuel Rüling, poet and composer (born 1586)
- date unknown
  - John Cooper, English composer (born c.1570)
  - Giovanni Priuli, organist and composer
- probable – Francesco Rognoni Taeggio, composer
