= Johannes de Cleve =

Johannes de Cleve (c. 1529 – 14 July 1582) was a composer active at the court of Ferdinand I and Charles II.

He was presumably born in the Duchy of Cleves, and recruited into the court as a choirboy in the same way as Lassus and many others. He was originally a singer in Ferdinand's chapel in Vienna, but when Charles II organized a new chapel in Graz in 1564, he appointed de Cleve as the first Kapellmeister in Graz.

== Works ==
- Laudatory and occasional Latin motets for the Habsburg court.
- 'Missa rex Babylonis venit ad lacum.'
