= 1638 in music =

The year 1638 in music involved some significant events.

== Events ==
- February 6 – Luminalia, a masque written by Sir William Davenant and designed by Inigo Jones, is staged at the English Court. The work features music by Nicholas Lanier.

== Publications ==
- Antonio Cifra – Sacrae cantiones for two, three, four, six, and eight voices (Rome: Vincenzo Blanco for Ludovico Grignani), published posthumously
- Claudio Monteverdi – Madrigali guerrieri, et amorosi con alcuni opuscoli in genere rappresentativo, che saranno per brevi Episodij fra i canti senza gesto. Libro ottavo di Claudio Monteverde Maestro di Capella della Serenissima Republica di Venetia (Eighth book of madrigals for five voices) (Venice: Alessandro Vincenti)

== Classical music ==
- Nicolas Formé – Ecce tu pulchra es, a double choir motet

== Opera ==
- Benedetto Ferrari and Francesco Manelli – La maga fulminata, premiered at Teatro San Cassiano, in Venice
- Michelangelo Rossi – Andromeda, premiered in Ferrara.

== Births ==
- July 15 – Giovanni Buonaventura Viviani, Italian composer and violinist (d. c. 1693)
- date unknown – Diogo Dias Melgás, composer (died 1700)

== Deaths ==
- January 21 – Ignazio Donati, composer (born c.1570)
- May 27 – Nicolas Formé, French composer (born 1567)
- September – John Wilbye, composer (born 1574)
- November 6 – Gabriel Díaz Bessón, composer (born 1590)
- date unknown – Francis Pilkington, composer, lutenist and singer (born c.1565)
- probable – Settimia Caccini, composer and singer (born 1591)
