= Aurelio Bonelli =

Italian composer

- Born: around 1569; Bologna
- Died: after 1620
- Occupations: composer, organist and painter

Aurelio Bonelli (c.1569 – after 1620) was an Italian composer, organist and painter of the Renaissance. Outside of his musical career practically nothing is known about him, save that he was born in Bologna and that he was a student of the painter Agostino Carracci. After Adriano Banchieri moved to Imola in 1601 Bonelli took his job as organist at San Michele in Bosco.

Towards 1600, Bonelli is known to have been working as an organist in Milan. Also, in 1620 he was organist of San Giovanni in Monte, Bologna. Bonelli published at least one volume of three-part Villanelle (Venice, 1596), a book of masses and motets, and his Il Primo Libro de Ricercari et canzoni a quattro voci con due toccate e doi dialoghi a otto. The last was published in Venice by Angelo Gardano in 1602; it is a collection of ricercars, canzonas, toccatas and eight-part madrigals (dialoghi).
