= 1630 in music =

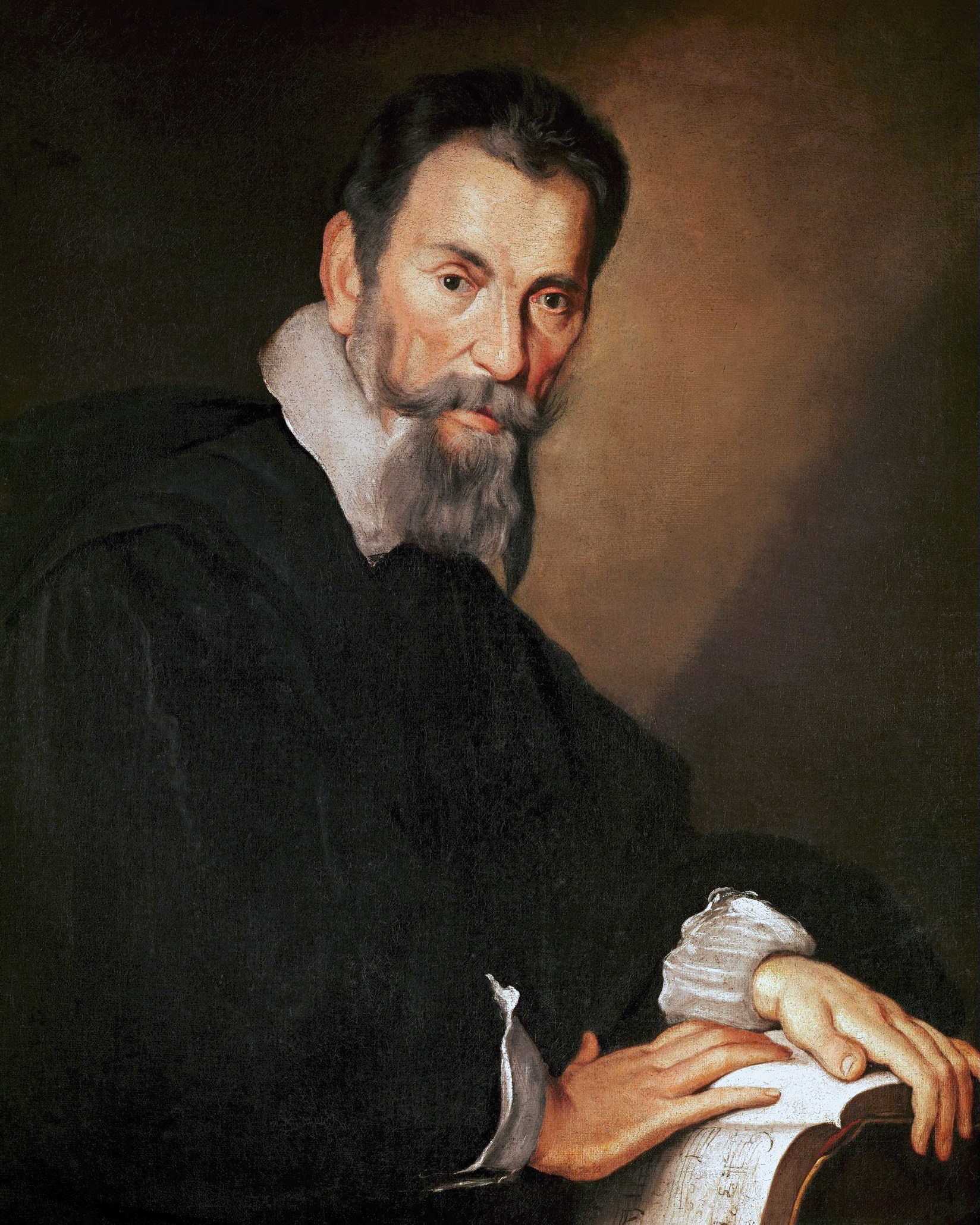
Bernardo Strozzi - Claudio Monteverdi (c.1630)

== Events ==
- Giacomo Carissimi becomes the chapelmaster at the Church of San Apollinare in the German-Hungarian College in Rome.
- Ján Šimbracký buys a house in Spišské Podhradie.

== Publications ==
- Paolo Agostini – Posthumous book of masses (Rome: Giovanni Battista Robletti)
- Adriano Banchieri – Trattenimenti da villa concertati in ordine seguente nel chitarrone con 5 voci in variati modi (Venice: Alessandro Vincenti), a collection of canzonettas for five voices and a theorbo
- Ignazio Donati – Le Fanfalughe for two, three, four, and five voices (Venice: Alessandro Vincenti), a book of madrigals
- Melchior Franck
  - Der 85. Psalm des Königlichen Propheten Davids (Herr, der du bist vormals gnädig gewest) for eight voices (Coburg: Johann Forckel), a motet written for the jubilee held June 25–27, 1630
  - Neues Christliches Weyhnacht Gesang for eight voices (Coburg: Johann Forckel), a Christmas motet
  - Gottfried von Bulljon oder das erlösete Jerusalem (Coburg: Johann Forckel), incidental music for an oratorio performed in Coburg on June 14, 1630
- Marco da Gagliano – Responsoria maioris hebdomadae for four voices (Venice: Bartolomeo Magni)
- Giovanni Girolamo Kapsberger
  - I pastori di Bettelemme nella nascita di N. Signor Giesu Christo (Rome: Paolo Masotti)
  - Modulatus sacri diminutis voculis concinnati, vol. 2 (Rome: Paolo Masotti)
- Carlo Milanuzzi – Seventh book of ariose vaghezze for solo voice and guitar, Op. 17 (Venice: Alessandro Vincenti)
- Martin Peerson – Mottects or grave chamber musique, containing songs of five parts of several sorts (London: William Stansby)

== Opera ==
- Claudio Monteverdi – Proserpina rapita

== Births ==
- date unknown – Antonio Sartorio, composer (died 1680)
- probable
  - Thomas Baltzar, violinist and composer (died 1663)
  - Hafız Post, Turkish composer (died 1694)
  - Susanna van Lee, Dutch actress and dancer (died 1700)

== Deaths ==
- February 12 or 13 – Camillo Cortellini, composer, singer, and violinist (born 1561)
- February 26 – William Brade, English composer, violinist and viol player (born 1560)
- June (or later) – Alessandro Grandi, Italian composer (born 1590)
- June 11 – Giovanni Francesco Anerio, Italian composer of oratorios (born c.1567)
- June 29 – John Mundy, English organist and composer (born c. 1550)
- September 7 – Giovanni Battista Fontana, composer (born 1589)
- November 19 – Johann Hermann Schein, German composer (born 1586)
- date unknown – Thomas Bateson, writer of madrigals (born 1570)
- probable – Salamone Rossi, Venetian composer (born 1570)
