= Alba Trissina =

Italian composer (fl. 1590)

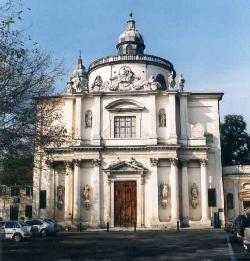
Santa Maria in Araceli, 80 km (50 mi) from Venice

Alba Trissina (fl. 1590) or Alba Tressina, was an Italian composer and nun.

She was a Carmelite at the monastery of Santa Maria in Araceli, Vicenza, and studied with Leone Leoni, who also preserved and published four of her works. Leoni dedicated his Quarto Libro, 1622, to this pupil.

== Works ==
Four motets for alto voice in Leoni's Sacri fiori: quarto libro de motettia are all of her compositions that survive.

- Vulnerasti cor meum, A: her most noted work =
- Quaemadmodum, A
- In nomine Iesu, AA
- Anima mea, AAT
