= 1628 in music =

The year 1628 in music involved some significant events.

== Events ==
- July 10 – Heinrich Schütz seeks a travel warrant from Johann Georg, Elector of Saxony, to return to Venice to visit Monteverdi and Alessandro Grandi.
- November 22 – Girolamo Frescobaldi is given permission by St Peter's Basilica to leave Rome.

== Published popular music ==
- Carlo Farina
  - Il quarto libro delle pavane, gagliarde, balletti, volte, passamezi, sonate, canzon
  - Fünffter Theil newer Pavanen, Brand: Mascharaden, Balletten, Sonaten
- Melchior Franck
  - Rosetulum musicum for four, five, six, seven, and eight voices with basso continuo (Coburg: Johann Forckel for Friedrich Gruner)
  - Sacri Convivii Musica Sacra for four, five, and six voices (Coburg: Johann Forckel), a collection of motets
  - Zwey Neue Musicalische Concert for three choirs (Coburg: Kaspar Bertsch), two wedding motets
  - Suspirium Germaniae Publicum for four and seven voices (Coburg: Johann Forckel), two motets
- Vinko Jelić
  - Arion primus sacrorum concentuum for one, two, three, and four voices with organ bass, Op. 2 (Strasbourg: Paul Lederz)
  - Arion secundus psalmorum vespertinorum for four voices with organ bass, Op. 3 (Strasbourg: Paul Lederz)
- Giovanni Girolamo Kapsberger – Cantiones sacrae, vol. 1 (Rome: Paolo Masotti)
- Carlo Milanuzzi – Sixth book of ariose vaghezze for solo voice with accompaniment, Op. 15 (Venice: Alessandro Vincenti)
- Peter Philips – Paradisus sacris cantionibus consitus for one, two, and three voices with organ bass (Antwerp: Pierre Phalèse)

== Opera ==
- Francesca Caccini – La liberazione di Ruggiero dall'isola d'Alcina
- Marco da Gagliano – La Flora, performed at the Teatro Mediceo on October 14 to celebrate the wedding of Odoardo Farnese and Margherita de Medici
- Nicholas Lanier – A musical setting (recitativo) of Christopher Marlowe's Hero and Leander
- Claudio Monteverdi – Il Ballo delle Ingrate

== Births ==
- January 1 – Christoph Bernhard, German composer (died 1692)
- date unknown – Robert Cambert, French composer of opera (died 1677)

== Deaths ==
- January 21 – Gregor Aichinger, composer (born c.1565)
- March – Alfonso Ferrabosco the younger, viol player and composer (born c.1575)
- March 12 or 13 – John Bull (composer), composer and organist (born c1562)
- November 16 – Paolo Quagliati, composer (born c. 1555)
- date unknown – Aziz Mahmud Hudayi, Sufi saint, poet, author and composer (born 1541)
