= James Clifford (musician) =

English divine and musician

James Clifford (1622–1698), was an English divine and musician.

Clifford, son of Edward Clifford, a cook, was born at Oxford, in the parish of St. Mary Magdalen, where he was baptised on 2 May 1622. He was a chorister at Magdalen College from 1632 to 1642, and was educated in the choir school. He took no degree at Oxford, and the date of his ordination is not known. On 1 July 1661 he was appointed tenth minor canon of St. Paul's Cathedral, in 1675 he became sixth minor canon, on 30 May 1682 was admitted senior cardinal, and on 24 November of the same year sacrist. He was for some years curate of St. Gregory by St. Paul's, a post he seems to have resigned before September 1695, in which month he was succeeded by Charles Green. He was also chaplain to the Society of Serjeants' Inn, Fleet Street, London.

== Works ==
In 1663 Clifford published the first edition of the work hy which he is best known, Divine Services and Anthems, usually sung in the Cathedrals and Collegiate Choires in the Church of England. This is a collection of words of anthems, and was originally intended only for use at St. Paul's, but in 1664 Clifford published a second edition, with large additions, so as to apply to 'all choirs in England and Ireland.' The work contains the words of 393 anthems, besides tunes of chants, &c., 'Brief Directions for the understanding of that part of the Divine Service performed by the Organ in St. Paul's Cathedral on Sundayes;' a 'Scale or Basis of Musick,' by Dr. Ralph Winterton, regius professor of medicine at Cambridge, and a 'Psalm of Thanksgiving,' sung by the children of Christ's Hospital, set to music by Thomas Brewer. The book is valuable from a liturgical point of view, besides which it has preserved a record of many anthems by English church composers which are now lost.

In 1694 Clifford published 'The Catechism, containing the Principles of Christian Religion,' together with 'A Preparation Sermon before the receiving of the Holy Sacrament of the Lord's Supper,' preached at Serjeants' Inn Chapel in Fleet Street. Clifford was twice married. His first wife's name is unknown, but on 30 May 1667 he obtained a license for his marriage at St. Dunstan in the West, or the chapel of Serjeants' Inn, with Clare Fisher of the parish of St. Gregory by St. Paul's. He died in September 1698. His will (dated 16 June 1687) was proved on the 26th of the same month by his widow, who, according to Hawkins (ed. 1853, p. 690), after her husband's death lived with her daughter in Wardrobe Court, Great Carter Lane, where they kept a school for little children. A son of his was baptised at St. Gregory's on 2 May 1679, and buried there in 1684. By his will he left all his music to be divided among the minor canons of St. Paul's.
