= Dorothea Schröder =

German musicologist

Dorothea Schröder (born 25 April 1957) is a German musicologist.

== Life ==
Born in Cuxhaven, Schröder studied musicology and art history in Hamburg. After obtaining her doctorate in 1986 in Hamburg and the habilitation in 1996, she taught there as privatdozentin in 1996 and as Professor of Historical Musicology in 2008.

== Publications (selection) ==
- Zeitgeschichte auf der Opernbühne. Barockes Musiktheater in Hamburg im Dienst von Politik und Diplomatie (1690–1745). Göttingen 1998, ISBN 3-525-27900-0.
- Spaziergänge durch das musikalische London. Zürich 1999, ISBN 3-7160-2236-5.
- Georg Friedrich Händel. Munich 2008, ISBN 978-3-406-56253-2.
- Maria Aurora von Königsmarck. Eine schwedische Gräfin aus Stade. Stade 2011, ISBN 978-3-87697-100-1.
