= 1694 in music =

The year 1694 in music involved some significant events.

== Events ==
- October 23 – Marriage of Johann Christoph Bach (organist at Ohrdruf) to Dorothea von Hof. The guests include Johann Pachelbel, and his canon may have been composed for the occasion.
- Musician Johannes Kelpius and his group of "mystics" arrive at the Wissahickon Creek in Philadelphia, Pennsylvania, bringing instruments that became an integral part of their church life.
- The semi-opera The Rape of Europa by Jupiter, with music by John Eccles and text by Peter Anthony Motteux, is staged in London.

== Classical music ==
- Tomaso Albinoni – 12 Sonata a tre (Op. 1)
- Dieterich Buxtehude – VII suonate, Op. 1 (date of publication unknown, but the print is listed in book fair catalogues of 1694)
- Marc-Antoine Charpentier
  - Messe de minuit pour Noël, H. 9
  - Prélude pour le Domine salvum, H. 535
- Giovanni Paolo Colonna – Psalmi ad Vesperas, Op. 12
- Arcangelo Corelli – 12 trio sonatas, Op. 4
- Francisco Guerau – Poema Harmonico
- Henry Purcell
  - Te Deum and Jubilate Deo, Z. 232
  - Come, Ye Sons of Art Away, Z. 323
  - I Lov'd Fair Celia, Z. 381
  - Distressed Innocence, Z. 577
  - The Virtuous Wife, Z. 611
  - Music for the Funeral of Queen Mary for Mary II of England
- Alessandro Scarlatti – Correa nel seno amato, H. 146
- Antonio Veracini – 10 violin sonatas, Op. 2
- Johann Paul von Westhoff – Sonate a Violino solo con basso continuo

== Opera ==
- Tomaso Albinoni – Zenobia, Regina de' Palmireni
- Giovanni Bononcini – Xerse
- Henri Desmarets – Circé
- John Eccles – Macbeth
- Francesco Gasparini – Il Roderico
- Elisabeth Jacquet de la Guerre – Céphale et Procris
- Johann Philipp Krieger – Hercules unter denen Amazonen
- Alessandro Scarlatti – Pirro e Demetrio, premièred in Naples

== Births ==
- July 4 – Louis-Claude Daquin, composer (died 1772)
- August 5 – Leonardo Leo, composer (died 1744)
- September 5 – František Václav Míča, conductor and composer (died 1744)
- date unknown – Pierre-Claude Foucquet, organist and harpsichordist (died 1772)

== Deaths ==
- March 11 – Jean-Nicolas Geoffroy, organist and harpsichordist (born 1633)
- May 1 – Maria Elisabeth Lämmerhirt, wife of Johann Ambrosius Bach and mother of Johann Sebastian Bach (born 1644)
- May 17 – Johann Michael Bach, composer, brother of Johann Christoph Bach (born 1648)
- October 12 – Delphin Strungk, organist and composer (born 1600/1601)
- December 20 – Erasmus Finx, hymn-writer (born 1627)
- date unknown – René Ouvrard, writer and composer (born 1624)
