= 1634 in music =

The year 1634 in music involved some significant events.

== Events ==
- February 3 – James Shirley's spectacular masque The Triumph of Peace is performed in London. The work features music by William Lawes, Simon Ives, and Bulstrode Whitelocke. It is repeated on February 13.
- September 29 (Michaelmas) – The masque Comus, by John Milton, is presented at Ludlow Castle, with music composed by Henry Lawes.

== Publications ==
- Ignazio Donati – First book of motets for solo voice, Op. 16 (Venice: Alessandro Vincenti)
- Melchior Franck
  - Zwey neue Christliche Klag- und Traur-Gesäng for four and six voices (Coburg: Johann Forckel), two funeral motets
  - Der 51. Psalm deß Königlichen Propheten Davids, Miserere mei Deus for four, five, six, and eight voices (Coburg: Johann Forckel), in both Lain and German
  - Neues Christliches Grabgesang (Ach du mein liebstes Jesulein) for four voices (Coburg, Johann Forckel), a funeral motet

== Classical music ==
- Charles d'Ambleville – Octonarium sacrum

== Opera ==
- William Lawes – The Triumph of Peace

== Births ==
- January 7 – Adam Krieger, composer (died 1666)
- March 26 – Domenico Freschi, composer (died 1710)
- date unknown
  - Clamor Heinrich Abel, German composer (died 1696)
  - Marc-Antoine Charpentier, French composer (died 1704)
- probable
  - Carlo Grossi, composer (died 1688)
  - Antonio Draghi, Italian composer (died 1700)

== Deaths ==
- October – George Kirbye, composer (born c.1565)
- November 15 – Johann Staden, organist and composer (born 1581)
- date unknown – Adriano Banchieri, Italian composer (born 1568)
