= 1636 in music =

The year 1636 in music involved some significant events.

== Events ==
- January – Johann Erasmus Kindermann is ordered to return to Nuremberg to become second organist of Frauenkirche.
- February 23 or 24 – The masque, Triumphs of the Prince d'Amour, by William Davenant, is performed, with music composed by brothers Henry and William Lawes.
- Vittoria Aleotti becomes prioress of the Augustinian convent of St. Vito, Ferrara, Italy.
- King Charles I and Queen Henrietta Maria visit Oxford University in August. They are entertained with plays, two of which — William Strode's The Floating Island and William Cartwright's The Royal Slave — feature music by Henry Lawes.

== Publications ==
- Manuel Cardoso
  - Second book of masses for four, five, and six voices (Lisbon: Laurenco Craesbeck)
  - Missae de Beata Virgine Maria, third book for four, five, and six voices (Lisbon: Laurenco Craesbeck)
- Ignazio Donati
  - Li vecchiarelli, et perregrini for two, three, and four voices, Op. 13 (Venice: Alessandro Vincenti)
  - Second book of motets for solo voice, Op. 14 (Venice: Alessandro Vincenti)
- Eustache Du Caurroy – Missa pro defunctis for five voices (Paris: Pierre Ballard), published posthumously
- Melchior Franck
  - Paradisus Musicus, Part 1, for two, three, and four voices with organ bass (Nuremberg: Wolfgang Endter), a collection of motets setting texts from the Book of Isaiah
  - Paradisus Musicus, Part 2, for one, two, three, and four voices with organ bass and violas (Nuremberg: Wolfgang Endter)
- Filipe de Magalhães – Cantica Beatissimae Virginis (Lisbon: Lourenço Craesbeeck)
- Carlo Milanuzzi – Hortus sacer deliciarum for one, two, and three voices, Op. 19 (Venice: Alessandro Vincenti)
- Heinrich Schütz – Kleine geistliche Konzerte (Small Sacred Concertos), part 1

== Births ==
- April 29 – Esaias Reusner, lutenist and composer (d. 1679)
