= 1637 in music =

The year 1637 in music involved some significant events.

== Events ==
- The first public opera house, Teatro San Cassiano, opens in Venice.
- Johann Jakob Froberger travels to Rome to study under Girolamo Frescobaldi.
- Delphin Strungk becomes organist at the Marienkirche in Brunswick.
- Robert Ramsey, organist of Trinity College, Cambridge, becomes Master of the Children at the college.
- Antonio Cesti joins the Franciscan order.
- The Westminster Musicians Guild attempts to assert control over the musicians of London, in competition with the Worshipful Company of Musicians.

== Classical music ==
- Benedetto Ferrari – Musiche varier a voce sola, volume 2, published in Venice
- Girolamo Frescobaldi – Partite sopra l'aria della Romanesca
- Tarquinio Merula – Canzoni overo Sonate concertate per chiesa e camera

== Opera ==
- Benedetto Ferrari & Francesco Manelli – Andromeda (the first publicly shown opera, premièred at Teatro San Cassiano in Venice, during carnival)
- Virgilio Mazzocchi – Chi soffre, speri (premièred February 12 at the Palazzo Barberini in Rome)

== Births ==
- February 11 – Friedrich Nicolaus Brauns, composer and music director (died 1718)
- December 7 – Bernardo Pasquini, composer of opera and church music (died 1710)
- date unknown – Giovanni Grancino, luthier (died 1709)
- probable – Dieterich Buxtehude (died 1707)

== Deaths ==
- May 29 – Jiří Třanovský, hymn-writer (born 1592)
- July 6 – Charles d'Ambleville, French composer
- September 14 – Theodoor Rombouts, painter of musicians (born 1597)
- dates unknown – Basilius Froberger and Anna Froberger, parents of Johann Jakob Froberger (plague)
