= Leone Leoni (composer) =

Italian composer

Leone Leoni (c. 1560 – 1627) was a North Italian polyphonic composer who served as maestro di cappella at Vicenza Cathedral from 1588. He composed motets for antiphonal choirs, some in many parts, with instrumental accompaniment. As would be expected of a cathedral maestro di cappella, he also produced masses, psalms, magnificats and other liturgical music, some published in his Cantici sacri (1608) as well as sacred and secular madrigals.

Leoni succeeded Giammateo Asola, his master, as maestro di capella when Asola returned to Venice; he contributed to the anthology Psalmodia vespertina dedicated to Palestrina by Asola and published at Venice. Several books of his motets were printed under the title Sacri fiori ("Sacred flowers") at Venice, and reprinted. He was received as a member by the Accademia Olimpica, Vicenza, some time between 1609 and 1612. He died at Vicenza. A pupil is likely to have been Ludovico Balbi.
