= 1624 in music =

The year 1624 in music involved some significant events.

== Events ==
- Antonio Bertali is employed as court musician in Vienna by Emperor Ferdinand II.

== Publications ==
- Juan Arañés – Libro Segundo de tonos y villancicos
- Thomas Elsbeth – Ein Hochzeitlicher Gesang (Von Gott mir ist erkohren) for five voices (Freiberg: Georg Hoffmann), a wedding song
- Melchior Franck
  - Neues Christliches Grabgesang for four voices (Coburg: Johann Forckel), a funeral motet
  - Neues Hochzeit Gesang auß dem 37. Psalm v. 4.5 for five voices (Coburg: Fürstliche Druckerei), a wedding motet for Johann Forckel, his printer
  - Neues Christliches Epithalamium, aus der Historia Isaacs und Rebeccae for twelve voices in two choirs (Coburg: Johann Forckel), a wedding motet
- Girolamo Frescobaldi – Il primo libro di capricci
- Sigismondo d'India
  - Seventh book of madrigals for five voices (Rome: Giovanni Battista Robletti)
  - Eighth book of madrigals for five voices and basso continuo (Rome: Giovanni Battista Robletti)
- Giovanni Girolamo Kapsberger – Poematia et carmina (Rome: Luca Antonio Soldi), a collection of songs by Pope Urban VIII
- Francis Pilkington – The second set of madrigals, and pastorals, of 3. 4. 5. and 6. parts (London: Thomas Snodham)
- Samuel Scheidt – Tabulatura nova, three books of organ music

== Classical music ==
- Claudio Monteverdi – Il Combattimento di Tancredi e Clorinda
- Johann Ulrich Steigleder – Ricercar Tabulatura

== Births ==
- Giovanni Antonio Pandolfi Mealli (1624-1687)
- date unknown
  - Francesco Provenzale, composer (died 1704)
  - François Roberday, organist and composer (died 1680)

== Deaths ==
- February 4 – Vicente Espinel, writer and guitarist (born 1550)
- October – Marcantonio Negri, composer, singer and musical director
- November 14 – Costanzo Antegnati, Italian organ builder, organist and composer
