= Charles d'Ambleville =

French composer

Charles d'Ambleville (died 6 July 1637 in Rouen) was a French composer. His Octonarium sacrum (1634) is a set of five-part verses for the Magnificat, using all eight tones, in fugal style. He also composed the Messe des Jésuites à Pékin (Mass of the Beijing Jesuits). He died at Rouen.

== Bibliography ==
- "San Francisco Bay area Early Music News January 2007" (pdf - see page 10).
