= Giacinto Bondioli =

Italian Dominican prior and composer

- Occupations: Prior, Composer

Giacinto Bondioli (1596–1636) was an Italian Dominican prior and composer. He was composer at Il convento de' PP. Predicatori di S. Domenico in Venice, and uncle and probably teacher of Biagio Marini.
