= Adam Gumpelzhaimer =

German composer

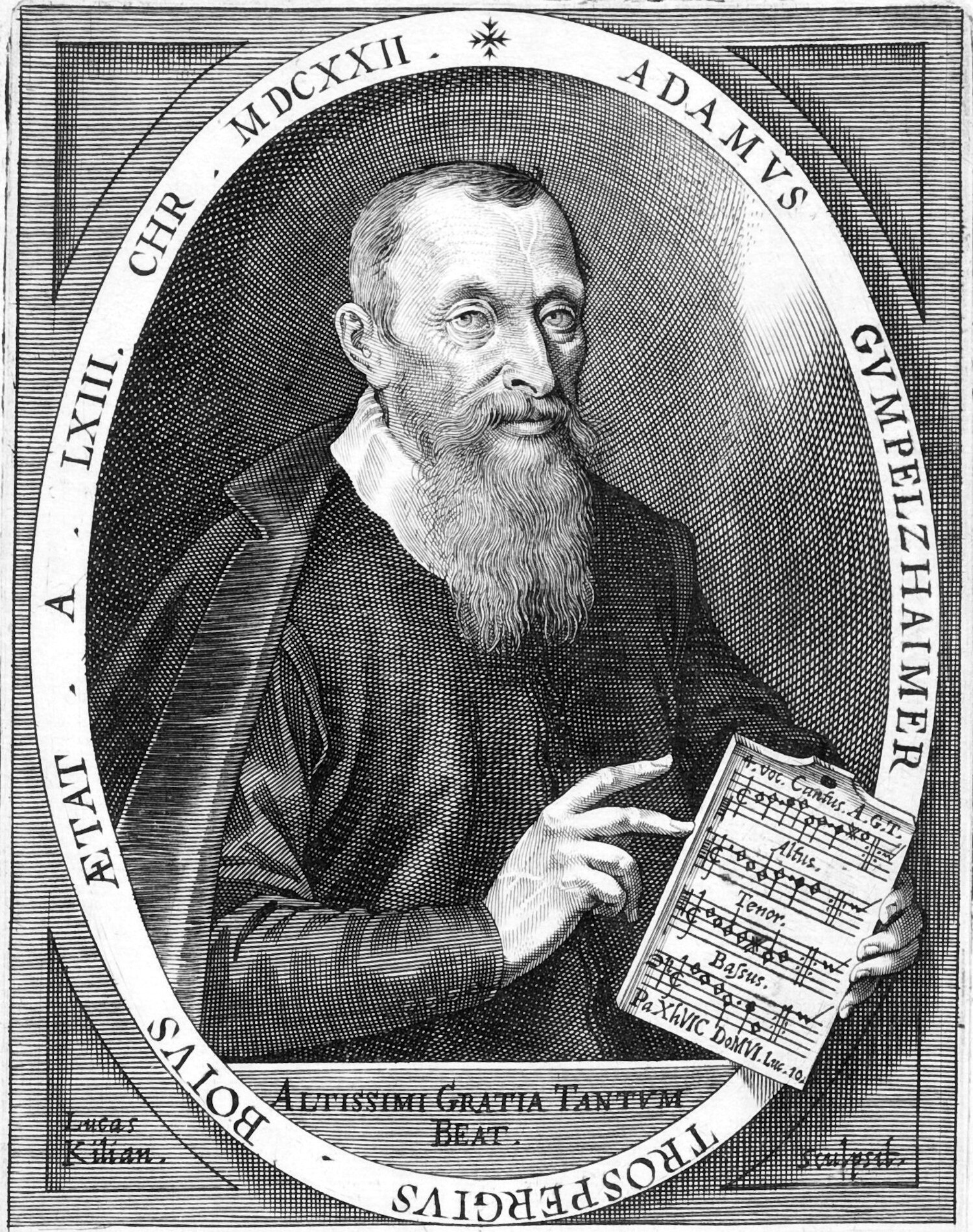
Adam Gumpelzhaimer, by Lucas Kilian (1622)

Adam Gumpelzhaimer, also Adam Gumpeltzhaimer (1559 – 3 November 1625) was a Bavarian composer and music theorist. Born in Trostberg, he studied music with the monk Jodocus Enzmüller. In 1581 he became cantor at the Augsburg Cathedral; a post he maintained until his death there in 1625. He is best known for his compositions of sacred music. He was also a noted collector of the works of Hans Leo Hassler, amassing the largest known collection of Hassler's manuscripts and prints.
