= Giovanni Battista Abbatessa =

Italian composer and guitarist

- Born: Bitonto, Kingdom of Naples
- Died: after 1651
- Occupation(s): Composer, guitarist
- Instrument: Baroque guitar

Giovanni Battista Abatessa (? – after 1651) was an Italian composer and Baroque guitarist, likely born in Bitonto (near Bari) in the Kingdom of Naples. His compositional output consists of four books of pieces for five-course Baroque guitar. While many of Abatessa's contemporaries used the guitar as an accompaniment for the voice, Abatessa's main focus was on the guitar as a solo instrument.

Abatessa's books contain instructions concerning the interpretation of the alphabeto tablature, the fingering of the chords, and the tuning of the guitar. The 1627 collection gives instructions regarding the execution of certain kinds of strum such as the trillo and repicco, while the 1635 book and the undated Ghirlanda di varii fiori contain a table of correspondences between alfabeto chords in different positions. The 1635 collection contains five villanellas; others are found in the 1652 book, with, however, only the words and the accompanimental chords for guitar notated. The 1652 book also explains how to tune the guitar with the harp, presumably for the simultaneous playing of Basso continuo parts.

== Works ==
- Corona di vaghi fiori (Florence, 1627) - contains battute solos in alfabeto notation.
- Cespuglio di varii fiori (Orvieto, 1635) - contains alfabeto solos, as well as songs in staff notation with alfabeto
- Intessatura di varii fiori (Naples, 1645) - contains alfabeto solos. Known from a later edition, (Rome and Lucca, 1652).
- Ghirlanda di varii fiori (Milan, c. 1650) - contains alfabeto solos.
