= 1635 in music =

The year 1635 in music involved some significant events.

== Events ==
- Composer and poet Elisabeth Sophie of Mecklenburg marries Augustus the Younger, Duke of Brunswick-Wolfenbüttel.
- Composer John Wilson enters the King's Musick as a lutenist.

== Classical music ==
- Giovanni Battista Abatessa – Cespuglio di varii fiori..., a collection of songs with alfabetto notation for the guitar, published in Orvieto
- Girolamo Frescobaldi – Fiori musicali (Musical Flowers), a collection of organ music
- Carlo Milanuzzi – Eighth book of ariose vaghezze for solo voice and accompaniment, Op. 18 (Venice: Alessandro Vincenti)
- Stefano Pasino – Masses for four voices, Op. 4 (Venice: Bartolomeo Magni)

== Opera ==
- Virgilio Puccitelli (attr.) – Giuditta

== Births ==
- June 3 – Philippe Quinault, dramatist and opera librettist (d. 1688)

== Deaths ==
- June 14 – Christian Erbach, organist and composer (b. c. 1568)
- October 10 – Johann Ulrich Steigleder, organist and composer (b. 1593)
- date unknown
  - Manuel Rodrigues Coelho, organist and composer (born c.1555)
