= Isaac Posch =

Austrian composer

Isaac Posch (1591–1622) was an Austrian composer and organist. He is chiefly known for his contribution to dance music Musicalische Ehrenfreudt 1618, and Musicalische Tafelfreudt 1621. Posch died in Ljubljana, Slovenia.
