= Carlo Farina =

Italian composer

Carlo Farina (ca. 1600 – July 1639) was an Italian composer, conductor and violinist of the Early Baroque era.

== Life ==
Farina was born at Mantua. He presumably received his first lessons from his father, who was sonatore di viola at the court of the Gonzaga in that city. Later, he got further education, probably by Salomone Rossi and Giovanni Battista Buonamente. From 1626 to 1629, he worked as concertmaster in Dresden. In Dresden, he worked with Heinrich Schütz, who interested him in composing. From 1629 to 1631, he was a prominent member of the electoral court orchestra in Bonn, until he returned to Italy, where he worked in Parma and later in Lucca until 1635. In 1635, he held a position at the court of Carlo I Cybo-Malaspina, Prince of Massa, and between 1636 and 1637 in Gdańsk. From 1638, he lived in Vienna, where he died of the plague probably a year later.

He is considered to be one of the earliest violin virtuosos, and he made many contributions to violin technique. For example, in his work Capriccio Stravagante (1627), he used the violin to imitate animal sounds like dogs barking or cats fighting. According to Cecil Forsyth's Orchestration, he "is generally credited" with "the invention of the double-stop" (although nearly a century earlier Ganassi’s Regola rubertina (1542–3) describes the technique, suggesting it was common among contemporary viol players.).

Musical lineage aside, Carlo Farina was granted the title of Count of Reggio di Calabria by Charles Emmanuel II, Duke of Savoy. He was head of music for the Royal Court of the Prince of Massa from 1626 to 1630.

== Work ==
During his stay in Dresden, he published five volumes, among them sonatas for 2, 3, 4 instruments and basso continuo. The pieces often have the same program as the title. Thus, he used Polish dance rhythms in the Sonata La Polaca or Hungarian motifs in La Cingara.

== Compositions ==
All published in Dresden:

- Libro delle pavane, gagliarde, brand: mascharata, aria franzesa, volte, balletti, sonate, canzone (1626)
- Ander Theil newer Paduanen, Gagliarden, Couranten, französischen Arien (1627, includes a set of Capriccio stravagante)
- Il terzo libro delle pavane, gagliarde, brand: mascherata, arie franzese, volte, corrente, sinfonie (1627)
- Il quarto libro delle pavane, gagliarde, balletti, volte, passamezi, sonate, canzon (1628)
- Fünffter Theil newer Pavanen, Brand: Mascharaden, Balletten, Sonaten (1628)

Additionally, seven short ballets survive in a manuscript copy.
