= Benedetto Ferrari =

Italian composer

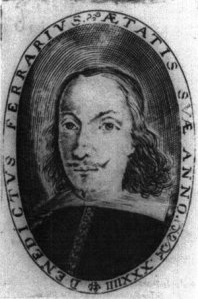
Benedetto Ferrari

Benedetto Ferrari (c. 1603 – 22 October 1681) was an Italian composer, particularly of opera, librettist, and theorbo player.

== Biography ==
Benedetto Ferrari was born in Reggio nell'Emilia. He worked in Rome (1617–1618), Parma (1619–1623), and possibly in Modena at some time between 1623 and 1637. He created music and libretti in Venice and Bologna, 1637–1644. Ferrari's Andromeda, with music by Francesco Manelli, was the first Venetian opera performed in a public theatre (in 1637). Subsequently, he provided both the text and the music for two operas, both presented in Venice: La maga fulminata (1638) and Il pastor regio (1640). The 1641 Bolognese staging of the latter included, as its final duet, the text "Pur ti miro, pur ti godo," which was later reused, possibly with Ferrari's music, for the final duet in the surviving manuscripts of Monteverdi's L'Incoronazione di Poppea.

Ferrari went to Vienna in 1651, serving the emperor Ferdinand III. Upon returning to Modena in 1653, he was appointed court choirmaster. His post was eliminated in 1662 but reinstated in 1674, after which he served until his death at Modena. Many sources recount his virtuosity as a theorbo player.

None of his operatic music survives. Extant works include libretti, an oratorio, and three books of monodies under the title Musiche varie a voce sola (Venice 1633, 1637, 1641). Though the last were composed within a relatively short time span, they reflect the changing style of accompanied monody, from the emergence of recitar cantando (midway between song and speech) to the vocal style that is typical of mid-17th century opera, with a more distinctive melody and a clearer rhythm.

== Bibliography ==
- Chiarelli, Francesca (2002). "Ferrari, Benedetto". The Oxford Companion to Italian Literature. Oxford University Press. ISBN 978-0-19-818332-7.
- Della Libera, Luca (1996). "FERRARI, Benedetto, detto dalla Tiorba". Dizionario Biografico degli Italiani (in Italian). Vol. 46: Feducci–Ferrerio. Rome: Istituto dell'Enciclopedia Italiana. ISBN 978-88-12-00032-6.
- Fuller-Maitland, John Alexander and George Fox (1880). A Dictionary of Music and Musicians (A.D. 1450-1880). London: Macmillan.
- Lee, E. M. (1909). The Story of Opera. New York: Scribner's.
- Smith, C. S. (1948). Makers of Opera. New York: H. Bittner.
