= 1632 in music =

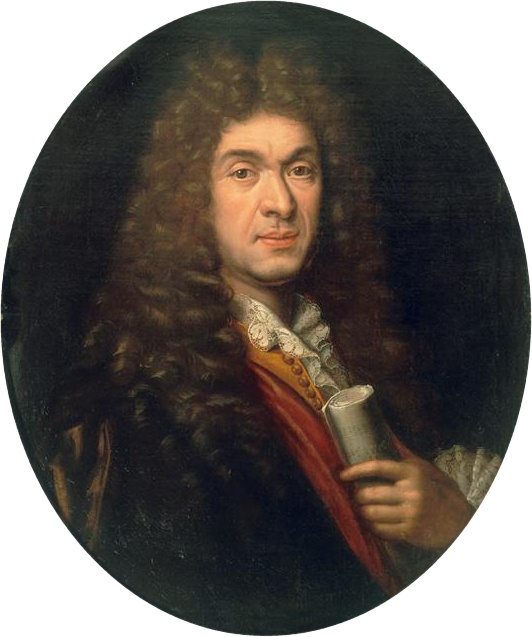
Jean-Baptiste Lully, by Paul Mignard

The year 1632 in music involved some significant events.

== Events ==
- December 29 – Just over halfway through a three-year contract as maestro di capella of Santa Maria Maggiore, Bergamo, Tarquinio Merula is dismissed for "indecency manifested towards several of his pupils."
- Opening of the Teatro delle Quattro Fontane in Rome.
- William Child becomes Master of the Choristers at St George's Chapel, Windsor.

== Publications ==
- Melchior Franck
  - Lobgesang (Hymn of Praise) for four voices (Coburg: Johann Forckel), a celebratory motet
  - Christliche Dancksagung zu unserm Neugebornen Jesulein (Christian thanksgiving for our newborn baby Jesus) for seven and eight voices (Coburg: Johann Forckel), three Christmas motets
- Claudio Monteverdi – Second book of Scherzi musicali (Venice: Bartolomeo Magni for Gardano), a collection of arias and madrigals
- Giovanni Palazzotto e Tagliavia — First book of Messe brevi concertate a otto voci, Op. 10
- Walter Porter – Madrigales and Ayres

== Opera ==
- Stefano Landi – Il Sant'Alessio (with libretto by Giulio Rospigliosi): Palazzo Barberini alle Quattro Fontane, 18 February 1632.

== Births ==
- February 18 – Giovanni Battista Vitali, composer (died 1692)
- April 2 (baptised) – Georg Caspar Wecker, organist and composer (died 1695)
- November 28 – Jean-Baptiste Lully, composer (died 1687)

== Deaths ==
- December 20 – Melchior Borchgrevinck, Danish musician, composer, and court Kapellmeister (born c.1570)
