= Tarquinio Merula =

Italian composer

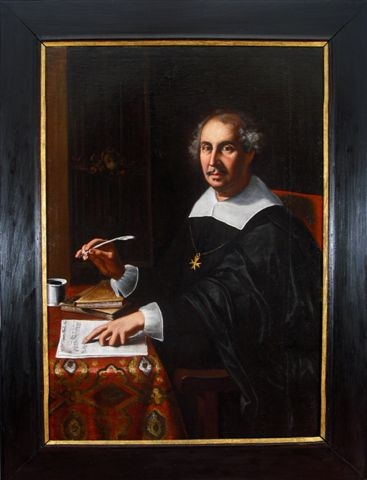

Background information
- Born: 24 November 1595; Busseto, Italy
- Died: 10 December 1665 (aged 70) Cremona, Italy
- Genre: Baroque
- Occupations: Composer, organist, violinist
- Instruments: Organ; violin
- Years active: 1616–1665

Tarquinio Merula (24 November 1595 – 10 December 1665) was an Italian composer, organist, and violinist of the early Baroque era. Although mainly active in Cremona, stylistically he was a member of the Venetian school. He was one of the most progressive Italian composers of the early 17th century, especially in applying newly developed techniques to sacred music.

== Life ==
He was born in Busseto. He probably received early musical training in Cremona, where he was first employed as an organist. In 1616, he took a position as organist at the church of Santa Maria Incoronata in Lodi, where he remained until 1621, at which time, he went to Warsaw, Poland to work as an organist at the court of Sigismund III Vasa.

In 1626, he returned to Cremona, and in 1627, he became maestro di cappella at the cathedral there, but he only remained for four years, moving to Bergamo to accept a similar position in 1631. Alessandro Grandi, his predecessor, had died in the Italian plague of 1629–31 (which affected many cities in northern Italy, including Venice), and he faced the formidable task of rebuilding the musical institution there after many of its members had died.

Unfortunately Merula got into trouble with some of his students, and was charged with indecency; he chose to return to Cremona, where he remained until 1635. During this period in his life, he seems to have had numerous troubles with his employers, possibly of his own making; after fighting with the administrators at Cremona over a variety of issues, he returned to Bergamo, serving this time at a different church, but was disallowed from using any musicians from his former place of employment. In 1646, he went back to Cremona for the final time, serving as maestro di cappella at the Laudi della Madonna until his death in 1665.

== Music and influence ==
Merula was a key figure in the early development of several forms which were to mature later in the Baroque era, such as the cantata, the aria, the sonatas da chiesa and da camera, variations on a ground bass, and the sinfonia.

In sacred music Merula followed the lead of Monteverdi, and often used the techniques of the elder composer; however he also did some new things, such as writing motets for solo voice accompanied by strings. His publications of 1639, 1640, and 1652 include masses which are written using ostinato basses, including the Ruggiero and the Romanesca. Some of his music is reminiscent of the stile concertato of Giovanni Gabrieli, and a modern sense of tonality prevails throughout.

Merula's secular music includes solo madrigals with instrumental accompaniment, sometimes using the Monteverdian stile concitato tremolo effect, and in formal design prefiguring the later Baroque cantata with its division into aria and recitative. He wrote one opera, La finta savia, produced in 1643, and based on a libretto by Giulio Strozzi. Among his instrumental music are numerous ensemble canzonas, whose sectional structure looks ahead to the sonata da chiesa, and his writing for strings—especially the violin—is exceptionally idiomatic, also looking ahead to the highly developed writing of the late Baroque.

He also wrote canzonettas, dialogues, keyboard toccatas and capriccios, a Sonata cromatica, and numerous other pieces which display an interest in just about every contemporary musical trend in north Italy.

A complete edition of his works was published in 1974 in Brooklyn, New York (T. Merula: Opere complete, ed. A. Sutkowski). A compilation of several of his solo vocal works was edited in 2012 by Phoebe Jevtovic, and samples can be found on her official website.

== Works ==
- Il primo libro delle canzoni a 4 (Canzoni a quattro voci per sonare con ogni sorti de strumenti musicali), 12 canzonas for 4 instruments, Op. 1 (1615):

I. La Ghirardella
II. La Lusignuola
III. La Pellegrina
IV. La Merula
V. La Chremesca
VI. La Ciria
VII. La Marcha
VIII. La Livia
IX. La Monteverde
X. L’Orbina
XI. La Piva
XII. La Loda

- Il primo libro de madrigaletti, 3 voices and continuo, Op. 4 (1624)
- Il primo libro de madrigali concertati, 4 to 8 voices and continuo, Op. 5 (1624)
- Il primo libro de motetti e sonate concertati, 2 to 5 voices, Op. 6 (1624)
- Satiro e Corisca dialogo musicale, 2 voices with continuo, Op. 7 (1626)
- Libro secondo de concerti spirituali con alcune sonate, 2 to 5 voices, Op. 8 (1628)
- Il secondo libro delle canzoni da suonare, 12 canzonas for 3 instruments (2 violins and a bass) with continuo, Op. 9 (ca. 1631)
- Madrigali et altre musiche concertate a 1–5, libro secondo, 1 to 5 voices, Op. 10 (1633)
- Pegaso salmi, motetti, suonate, libro terzo, 2 to 5 voices, Op. 11 (ca. 1637)
- Canzoni overo Sonate concertate per chiesa e camera, 2 or 3 instruments, book 3, Op. 12 (1637):

I. La Gallina
II. La Pedrina
III. La Caravaggia
IV. La Treccha
V. La Polachina
VI. La Loda
VII. La Pochetina
VIII. La Bellina
IX. La Ghisa
X. La Cattarina
XI. La Bianca
XII. La Ruggiera
XIII. La Maruta
XIV. La Merula
XV. L’Arisia
XVI. La Dada
XVII. La Pighetta
XVIII. Ruggiero
XIX. Ballo detto Eccardo
XX. Chiaccona
XXI. L’Ara
XXII. La Strada
XXIII. Ballo detto Gennaro
XXIV. Ballo detto Pollicio

- Curtio precipitato et altri capricii, libro secondo, solo voice, Op. 13 (1638)
- Canzonette a 3 et 4, not extant, Op. 14? (before 1649)
- Concerto messi, salmi concertati, 2–8 voices & instruments, Op. 15 (1639)
- Arpa Davidica salmi, et messe, 4 voices, Op. 16 (1640)
- Il Quarto Libro delle canzoni da suonare, a 2 to 3 instruments, Op. 17 (1651):
  - A doi Violini (b. c.)

I. L’Ariberta
II. La Canossa
III. La Bulgarina
IV. L’Appiana
V. La Ferrara
VI. La Illica
VII. La Rossa
VIII. La Speltina
IX. La Calzolara

  - A 2. Violino, & Basso (violone, b. c.)

X. La Bolla
XI. La Miradoro
XII. La Scarinza
XIII. La Noce
XIV. La Cappellina
XV. La Tinta
XVI. La Berlasina
XVII. La Monteverde

  - A 3. Doi Violini, & Violone (b. c.)

XVIII. La Cavagliera
XIX. La Pusterla
XX. La Loda
XXI. L’Anselma
XXII. La Lugarina
XXIII. La Lanzona
XXIV. La Valcharenga
XXV. La Brena
XXVI. Sonata Prima La Sartoria
XXVII. Sonata Seconda
XXVIII. Sonata Terza
XXIX. Sinfonie di tutti gli tuoni (8)

- Il terzo libro delle salmi et messa concertati, 3 or 4 voices, Op. 18 (1652)

== References and further reading ==
- Stephen Bonta: "Tarquinio Merula", Grove Music Online ed. L. Macy (Accessed January 9, 2005), Grove Music Online
- Manfred Bukofzer, Music in the Baroque Era. New York, W.W. Norton & Co., 1947. ISBN 0-393-09745-5
- Eleanor Selfridge-Field, Venetian Instrumental Music, from Gabrieli to Vivaldi. New York, Dover Publications, 1994. ISBN 0-486-28151-5
- Simone Manfredini, Per una biografia di Tarquinio Merula, musicista cremonese del Seicento, "Bollettino Storico Cremonese", n.s. 9 (2002), 85–106.
- Joachim Steinheuer, Chamäleon und Salamander, Kassel-Basel-London-New York-Prag 1999. ISBN 3-761-81428-3
- Adam Sutkowski, Tarquinio Merula : Opere complete. 4 Vol. Brooklyn (N.Y.), 1974–78.
- Maurizio Padoan, Tarquinio Merula nelle fonti documentarie, in Contributi alla musica lombarda del Seicento, Bologna Milano, A.M.I.S., 1972, pp. 57–157.
