= Christoph Demantius =

German composer

- Born: 15 December 1567; Reichenberg
- Died: 20 April 1643 (aged 75); Freiberg
- Education: University of Wittenberg
- Occupations: Composer; Music theorist; Writer
- Organizations: Freiberg Cathedral

Johann Christoph Demantius (15 December 1567 – 20 April 1643) was a German composer, music theorist, writer and poet. He was an exact contemporary of Monteverdi, and represented a transitional phase in German Lutheran music from the polyphonic Renaissance style to the early Baroque.

== Life ==
Demantius was born in Reichenberg (now Liberec in the Czech Republic), and probably received his early training there, though little information is available about his early life. By the early 1590s he was in Bautzen, where he wrote a school textbook, and in 1593 he received a degree from the University of Wittenberg. In 1594 he moved to Leipzig, and in 1597 he acquired the post of Kantor at Zittau, where he probably taught the young Melchior Franck.

His next post, one he held for the rest of his life, was as Kantor to Freiberg Cathedral. While he was able to keep his position, the Thirty Years' War was disruptive to his life, and most of his children, of four different marriages, died due to the hardships imposed by the war.

== Works ==
Demantius was a hugely prolific composer, though many of his works have been lost. Stylistically he was a successor to Lassus, who was also working in Germany during the first part of Demantius's life. He wrote most of his music before the Thirty Years' War; it is probable that the hardships of the war, including lack of performing musicians, made it difficult to compose and publish.

In the realm of sacred music Demantius wrote motets, masses, Magnificat settings, psalm settings, hymns, and a splendid setting of the St. John Passion, one of the most significant passion settings of the late Renaissance. This work, for six voices, is considered to be the last in the development of the German motet passion; those composed later were to be of the more dramatic kind, culminating in Bach's St John Passion. Demantius's setting includes a setting of Isaiah 53 in addition to the usual text from the Gospel of John.

His motets are of a late Renaissance type, and all Lutheran; some are in German and others Latin. They are conservative in that they avoid some of the Italian Baroque innovations such as the stile concertato and the basso continuo, both of which were becoming widely used in Germany by 1610; but he also created a highly individual musical language using traditional forms and means, quite distinct from the Palestrinian polyphony adopted by the other composers of the time commonly regarded as "conservative."

He also wrote secular music, both vocal and instrumental, including threnodies, dances, epithalamia, and numerous other occasional works. Most likely he wrote the poetry for his own music.

As a music theoretician he is famous for compiling the first dictionary of musical terms in the German language. He also published a textbook for teaching music in school, Forma musices, in 1592, at Bautzen.

== References and further reading ==
- Walter Blankenburg, "Christoph Demantius". The New Grove Dictionary of Music and Musicians, ed. Stanley Sadie. 20 vol. London, Macmillan Publishers Ltd., 1980. ISBN 1-56159-174-2
- Walter Blankenburg/Dorothea Schröder: "Christoph Demantius", Grove Music Online, ed. L. Macy (Accessed July 3, 2007), (subscription access)
- Gustave Reese, Music in the Renaissance. New York, W.W. Norton & Co., 1954. ISBN 0-393-09530-4
- Manfred Bukofzer, Music in the Baroque Era. New York, W.W. Norton & Co., 1947. ISBN 0-393-09745-5
