= Giovanni Girolamo Kapsperger =

Austrian-Italian composer and virtuoso lutenist

Giovanni Girolamo Kapsberger
- Johann(es) Hieronymus von Kapsberger
- Born: circa 1580 (possibly) Venice, Republic of Venice
- Died: 1651; Rome, Papal States
- Notable work: Libro primo d'Intavolatura di Chitarone; Libro quatro d'Intavolatura di Chitarone
- Style: Renaissance Music

Personal coat of arms
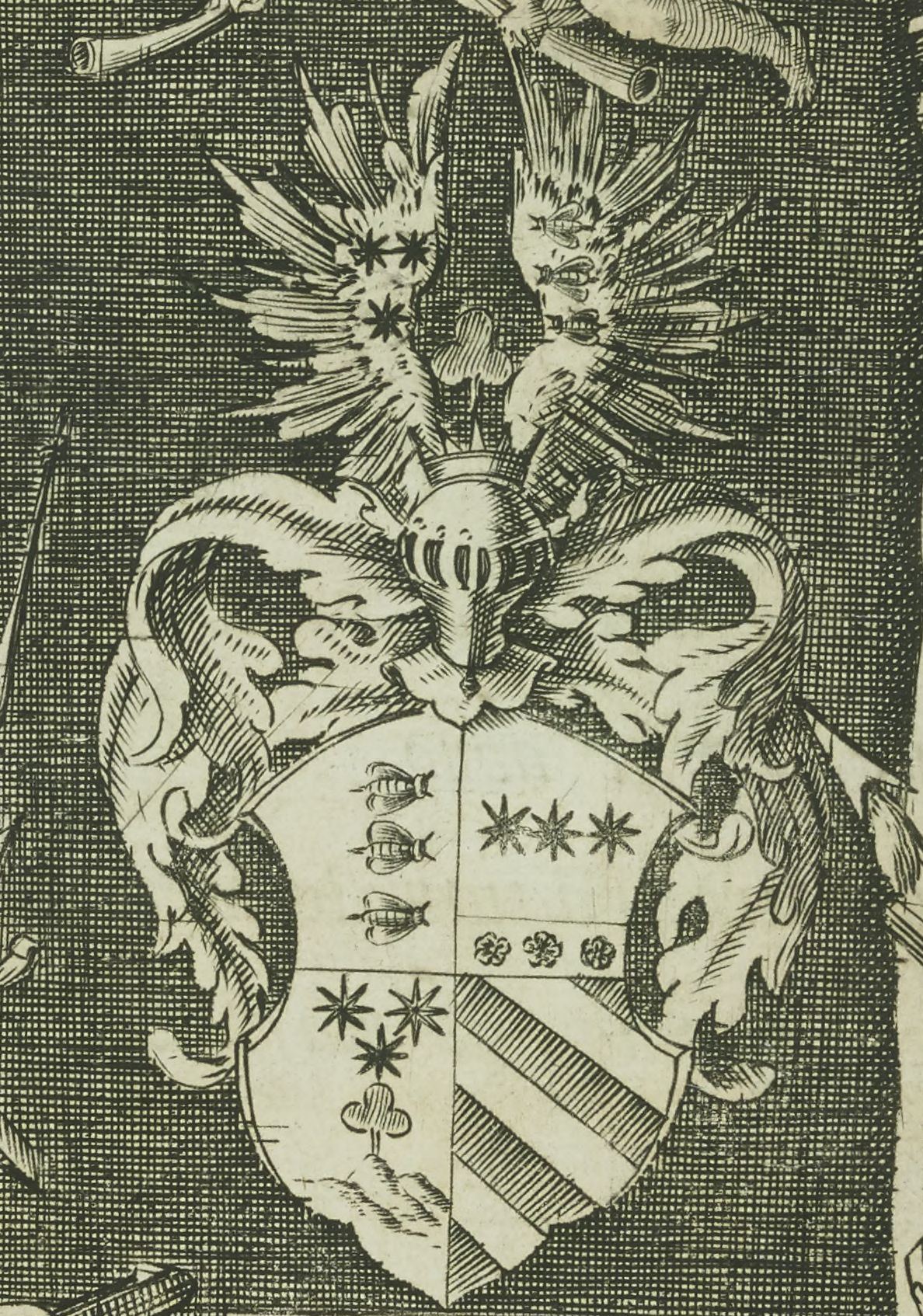

Johannes Hieronymus von Kapsberger, commonly known by his Italian name: Giovanni Girolamo Kapsperger, (also: Johann Hieronymus Kapsberger, Giovanni Geronimo Kapsperger; possibly Venice, c. 1580 – Rome, 17 January 1651) was an Austrian-Italian virtuoso performer and composer of the early Baroque period. A prolific and highly original composer, Kapsberger is chiefly remembered today for his lute and theorbo (chitarrone) music, which was seminal in the development of these as solo instruments.

He was nicknamed "the noble German" and "the German of the theorbo", referencing his ethnicity and fame as a virtuoso of the theorbo and of the other instruments belonging to the lute family.

== Life ==
Nothing is known about Kapsberger's date and place of birth. His father Colonel Wilhelm (Guglielmo) von Kapsperger was a military official of the Imperial House of Austria, and may have settled in Venice, the city which may have been Kapsberger's birthplace.

After 1605, Kapsberger moved to Rome, where he quickly attained a reputation as a brilliant virtuoso. He cultivated connections with various powerful individuals and organizations and organized "academies" in his house, which were counted among the "wonders of Rome". Around 1609, Kapsberger married Gerolima di Rossi, with whom he had at least three children. He started publishing his music at around the same time, with more than a dozen collections of music appearing during the next ten years. These included the celebrated Libro I d'intavolatura di lauto (1611), Kapsberger's only surviving collection of music for lute.

In 1624, Kapsberger entered the service of Cardinal Francesco Barberini, where he worked with numerous important composers, such as Girolamo Frescobaldi and Stefano Landi, and poets which included Giulio Rospigliosi, the future Pope Clement IX. Kapsberger worked in Barberini's household until 1646. He died in 1651.

== Works ==
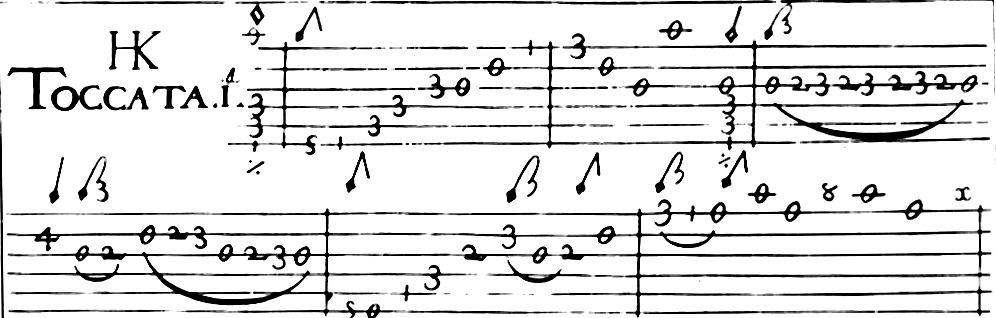
First measures of the tablature of the first tocatta of the libro primo d'intavolatura di chitarone (first book of chitarone tablature) by Johannes Hieronymus Kapsberger published in Venice in 1604. The monograph HK stands for Hieronymus Kapsberger.

Kapsberger is best remembered as a composer for lute and theorbo. At least six collections were published during his lifetime, two of which are currently lost. Kapsberger's writing is characterized, especially in toccatas, by spontaneous changes, sharp contrasts, unusual rhythmic groupings and, sometimes, passages that do not conform to the rules of counterpoint that were in use at the time.

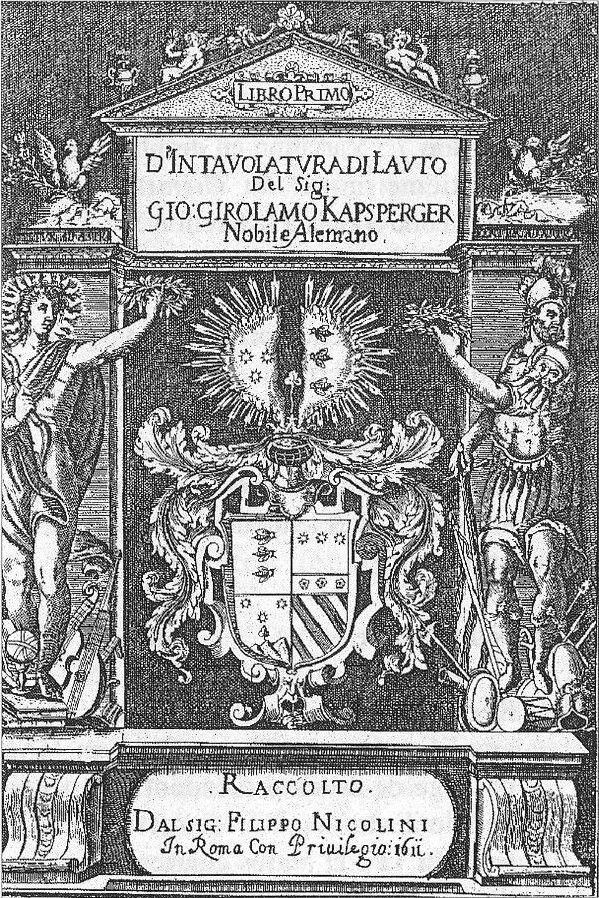
Title page of Kapsberger's Libro primo d'intavolatura di lauto, the only surviving collection of his works for lute, depicting the von Kapsberger coat of arms

The vast majority of contemporary critics praised Kapsberger's compositional skill and innovations. Among them was Athanasius Kircher, who described Kapsberger as a "superb genius" and attested that he has "successfully penetrated the secrets of music." One notable exception was the critic Giovanni Battista Doni, who was initially supportive of the composer, but then turned against him for unclear reasons and criticised his music in print.

Some contemporaries, such as Stefano Landi, mentioned that Kapsberger was not as meticulous a composer as he was as a performer. The features listed above led some modern scholars to share this view and they tend to believe that Kapsberger was a composer of inferior ability. Prominent among these critics is lutenist Rolf Lislevand: in his words, "Kapsberger was as bad a composer as he was a fine instrumentalist [...] The ideas are often badly developed, and are freely associated with one another; no real musical discourse is built up [...] the rhythm—even after serious efforts at fathoming it—wavers between inspired cleverness and total confusion."

Regardless of how one regards his compositional prowess, Kapsberger was one of the principal composers of lute and theorbo music during the early Baroque era (together with Alessandro Piccinini) and greatly contributed towards advancing European plucked string instruments of the time. Also, Kapsberger's toccatas may have influenced those of Girolamo Frescobaldi, much like French lute music would, some years later, influence Johann Jakob Froberger's suites.

Kapsberger's other music includes two collections of instrumental ensemble dances, rare for the period, and a wealth of vocal music, which was widely performed during his lifetime, but which is now critically less acclaimed. Kapsberger also wrote stage music, almost all currently lost. The only surviving work of this kind is Apotheosis sive Consecratio SS Ignatii et Francisci Xaverii (1622).

== List of works ==
These are works published during the composer's lifetime and with us today. Not included are the few pieces that survive in manuscript only or pieces of questionable attribution.

=== for Lute and theorbo ===
- Libro primo d'intavolatura di chitarrone (1604): 6 toccatas, 7 sets of variations, 12 galliards, Tenore del Kapsberger
- Libro primo d'intavolatura di lauto (1611): 8 toccatas, 12 gagliards, 12 correntes
- Libro terzo d'intavolatura di chitarrone (1626), a recently rediscovered collection, now at Yale: 8 toccatas, 1 "gagliarda partita", 2 correntes; then an entire section as practical tutorial for chitarrone players including "passaggi diversi su le note per sonare sopra la parte", cadenzas in tablature, a «tavola per intavolare sopra il Chitarrone, alla Italiana et alla Francese,» a «tavola per sonare il chitarrone sopra il basso».
- Libro quarto d'intavolatura di chitarrone (1640): 12 toccatas, 16 preludes, 10 passacaglias, 5 chaconnes, and numerous other pieces, including dances, variations, canzonas, etc.

=== Other instrumental ===
- Libro primo de balli, gagliarde et correnti, a quattro voci (1615): 8 balli, 6 gagliards, 6 correntes
- Libro primo di sinfonie, a quattro voci (1615): 18 sinfonies à 4 with basso continuo

=== Sacred vocal ===
- Libro primo di mottetti passeggiati (1612), 20 motets for voice and basso continuo
- Cantiones sacrae (1628), 21 pieces for 3–6 voices and basso continuo
- Modulatus sacri diminutis voculis concinnati (1630), for voice and basso continuo
- I pastori di Bettelemme (1630), for six voices and basso continuo
- Missae urbanae (1631), three masses for 4, 5 and 8 voices with basso continuo
- Litaniae deiparae virginis (1631), four litanies for 4, 6 and 8 voices with basso continuo

=== Secular vocal ===
==== Villanellas ====
- Libro primo di villanelle (1610), 20 villanellas for 1–3 voices and basso continuo
- Libro secundo di villanelle (1619), 21 villanellas for 1–3 voices and basso continuo
- Libro terzo di villanelle (1619), 20 villanellas for 1–3 voices and basso continuo
- Libro quarto di villanelle (1623), 23 villanellas for 1–3 voices and basso continuo
- Libro quinto di villanelle (1630), villanellas for 1–4 voices and basso continuo
- Li fiori – Libro sesto di villanelle (1632), villanellas for 1–4 voices and basso continuo
- Libro settimo di villanelle (1640), villanellas for 1–3 voices and basso continuo

==== Arie passeggiate ====
- Libro primo di arie passeggiate (1612), 22 arias for voice and theorbo basso continuo
- Libro secundo di arie passeggiate (1623), 30 arias for 1–2 voices and basso continuo

==== Other works ====
- Libro primo de madrigali (1609), madrigals for five voices and basso continuo
- Poematia et carmina [...] liber I (1624), 10 settings of verses by Pope Urban VIII, for voice and basso continuo
- Coro musicale (1627), wedding songs for voice and basso continuo

=== Stage ===
- Apotheosis sive Consecratio SS Ignatii et Francisci Xaverii (1622)

=== Lost ===
- Maggio Cantata nel Real Palazzo de Pitti (1612), secular cantata
- Libro secundo d'intavolatura di chitarrone (1616)
- Libro secundo d'intavolatura di lauto (1619)
- Epitalamio [...] recitativo a piu voci (1628), secular vocal music
- Libro terzo d'arie passeggiate (1630)
- Poematia et carmina [...] liber II (1633), settings of verses by Pope Urban VIII
- La vittoria del principe Vladislao in Valacchia (1625), opera
- Fetonte (1630), dramma recitato

Also, a compositional treatise by Kapsberger, Il Kapsperger della musica, was announced in 1640 in the preface to Libro quarto d'intavolatura di chitarrone, but is now lost.
