= Antonio Cifra =

Italian composer

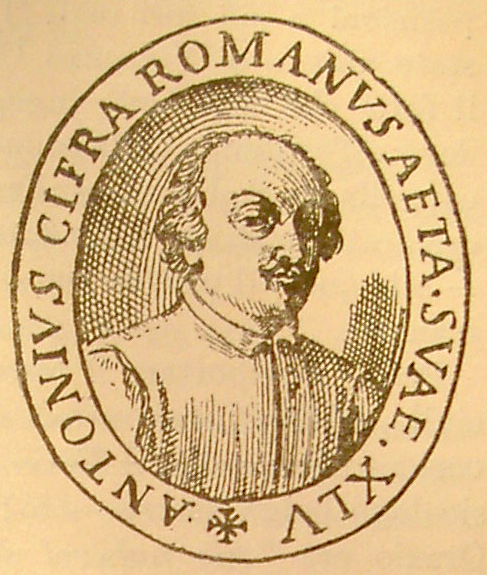
Portrait of Antonio Cifra on the title page of the Sacrae Cantiones, Roma, 1638

Antonio Cifra (1584? – 2 October 1629 in Loreto) was an Italian composer of the Roman School of the Renaissance and early Baroque eras. He was one of the significant transitional figures between the Renaissance and Baroque styles, and produced music in both idioms.

== Life and works ==
Son of Costanzo and Claudia, Antonio Cifra was born perhaps in Bassiano (near Terracina). He studied with Giovanni Bernardino Nanino from 27 June 1594 at San Luigi dei Francesi in Rome and then, from 18 January 1597, he was boy soprano of the Cappella Giulia at St Peter. From 1605 to 1607, he was maestro at the Roman Seminary, and from 1608 to 1609, he held the same position at the German College in Rome. In 1609, he was hired as maestro di cappella at Santa Casa in Loreto, where he remained the rest of his life. Cultural connections between Loreto and Rome were close (since Loreto was a pilgrimage destination), and he maintained contact with the composers in Rome during this period. Near the end of his life, he took part in several large musical events in Rome, including a large Vespers at St. Peter's for which he batteva (beat time) for one of the choirs.

Cifra was a prolific composer, with 45 separate publications to his credit: they included psalms, motets, litanies, Scherzi sacri, masses, polychoral motets, and sacred songs, as well as secular music including madrigals in both the Renaissance a cappella and Baroque concertato forms.

Stylistically, Cifra's music varies between masses in the Palestrina style, with much use of homophony (as desired by the Counter-Reformation Council of Trent, which had required that polyphonic elaboration be minimized so as to allow for clear expression of the text), and more progressive works in the Venetian style. He also used the technique of monody, as pioneered in northern Italy, for some of his solo madrigals. Some of his concertato madrigals are like small cantatas, and can be seen as foreshadowing this development, which began around the time he died.

Cifra was also one of the very few composers to be influenced by the extreme chromaticism of Carlo Gesualdo. While Cifra did not adopt the technique for many works, or for long, he did publish one book of madrigals which appear to be deliberate copies of Gesualdo's style (the Madrigali concertati libro quinto, 1621). For these madrigals, he used 18 of Gesualdo's own texts.

== Sources ==
- Articles "Antonio Cifra", "Carlo Gesualdo" in The New Grove Dictionary of Music and Musicians, ed. Stanley Sadie. 20 vol. London, Macmillan Publishers Ltd., 1980. ISBN 1-56159-174-2

== Bibliography ==
- Alberto Cametti, La scuola dei «pueri cantus» di S. Luigi dei francesi in Roma e i suoi principali allievi (1591-1623): Gregorio, Domenico e Bartolomeo Allegri, Antonio Cifra, Orazio Benevoli, Torino, Fratelli Bocca, 1915
- Jerome Roche/R, Antonio Cifra in New Grove Dictionary
