= Adriano Banchieri =

Italian composer

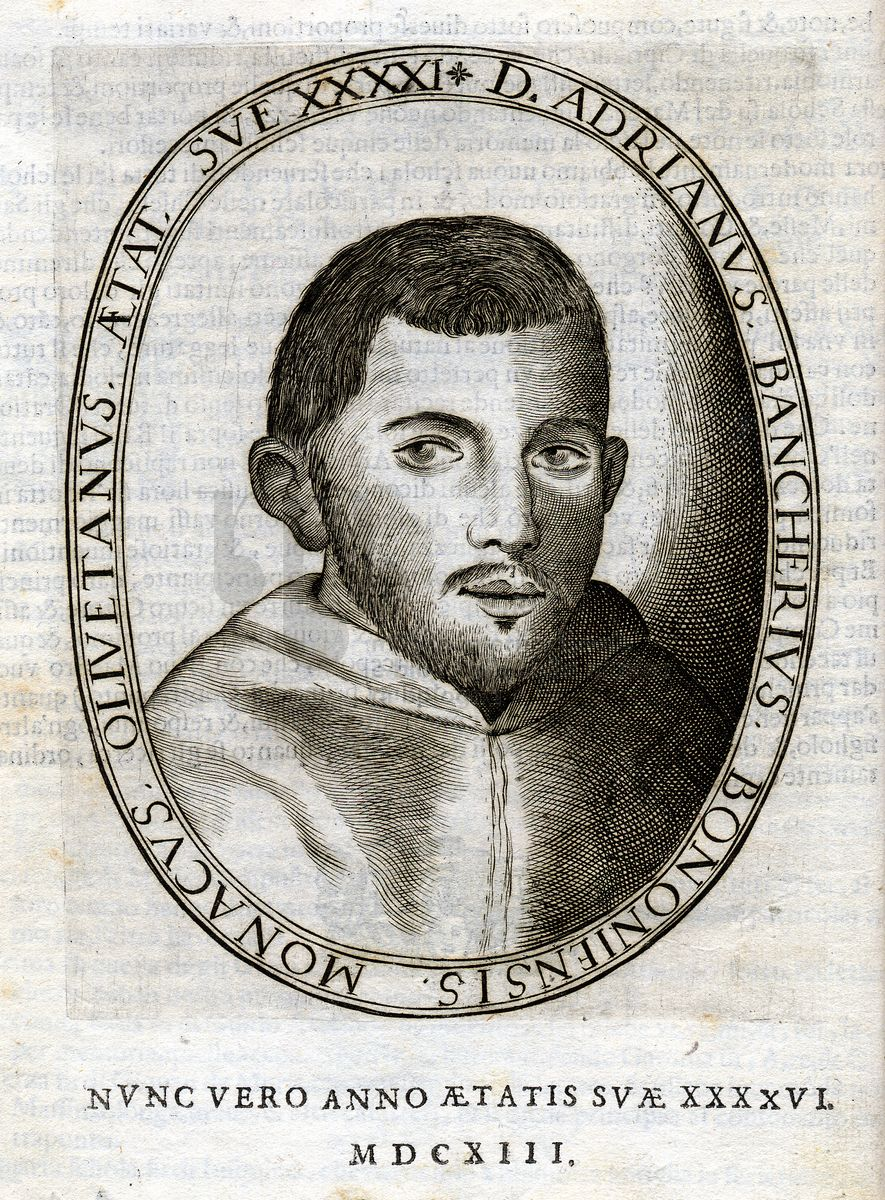
Adriano Banchieri.

Adriano Banchieri (3 September 1568 – 1634) was an Italian composer, music theorist, organist and poet of the late Renaissance and early Baroque eras. He founded the Accademia dei Floridi in Bologna.

== Biography ==
He was born and died in Bologna (then in the Papal States). In 1587 he became a monk of the Benedictine order, taking his vows in 1590, and changing his name to Adriano (from Tommaso). One of his teachers at the monastery was Gioseffo Guami, who had a strong influence on his style.

Like Orazio Vecchi he was interested in converting the madrigal to dramatic purposes. Specifically, he was one of the developers of a form called "madrigal comedy" — unstaged but dramatic collections of madrigals which, when sung consecutively, told a story. Formerly, madrigal comedy was considered to be one of the important precursors to opera, but most music scholars now see it as a separate development, part of a general interest in Italy at the time in creating musico-dramatic forms. In addition, he was an important composer of canzonettas, a lighter and hugely popular alternative to the madrigal in the late 16th century.

Banchieri disapproved of the monodists with all their revolutionary harmonic tendencies, about which he expressed himself vigorously in his Moderna Practica Musicale (1613), while systematizing the legitimate use of the monodic art of figured bass.

In several editions beginning in 1605 (reprinted at least six times before 1638), Banchieri published a series of organ works entitled l'Organo suonarino.

Banchieri's last publication was the Trattenimenti da villa of 1630. According to Martha Farahat he wrote five madrigal comedies between 1598 and 1628 with "plot and character development", starting with La pazzia senile of 1598, the last of them La saviezza giovenile.

== Works ==
=== Secular vocal works ===
- Primo libro di Madrigali a 4 voci (Milano, 1597)
- 6 Libri di canzonette a 3 voci
  - I Libro: Hora prima di ricreazione (Venezia, 1597)
  - II Libro: La pazzia senile. Ragionamenti vaghi et dilettevoli (Venezia, 1598)
  - III Libro: Il studio dilettevole a 3 voci, nuovamente con vaghi argomenti et spassevoli intermedii fiorito nell'Amfiparnasso commedia musicale dell'Honoratio Vecchi (Milano, 1600)
  - IV Libro: Il Metamorfosi musicale (Venezia, 1601)
  - V Libro: Virtuoso ridotto tra signori e dame entr' il quale si concentra recitabilmente in suoni e canti una nuova commedia detta prudenza giovanile... Op.15 (Milano, 1607); republished as Saviezza giovanile'(Venezia, 1628)
  - VI Libro: Tirsi, Fili e Clori che in verde prato di variati fiori cantano (Venezia, 1614)
- Il Zabaione musicale inventione boscareccia (Milano, 1604), first book of madrigals for five voices
- Barca di Venetia per Padova, Op.12 (Libro II madrigali a 5 voci, Venezia, 1605)
- Festino nella sera del giovedì grasso avanti cena, Op. 18 (Libro III madrigali a 5 voci, Venezia, 1608)
- Vivezze di Flora e Primavera cantate recitate e concertate con 5 voci, nello spinetto o chitarrone, Op. 44 (Libro V madrigali a 5 voci, Venezia, 1622)
- La Sampogna musicale (Bologna, 1625)
- Il virtuoso ritrovo accademico del Dissonante, publicamente praticato con varianti concerti musicali a 1-5 voci ò stromenti nell'Accademia dei Filomusi, Op. 49 (Venezia, 1626)
- La fida fanciulla, commedia esemplare con musicali intermedii apparenti e inapparenti (Bologna, 1628)
- Trattenimenti da villa concertati in ordine seguente nel chitarrone con 5 voci in variati modi. Vaga et curiosa concatenatione drammatica (Libro VI madrigali a 5 voci, Venezia, 1630)

=== Sacred vocal works ===
- Vezzo di perle musicali a 2 voci Op 23 (Bologna 1610)
- Nuovi pensieri ecclesiastici...
  - Libro III Op 35 (1613)

== References in modern culture ==
In 2008, a group of four composers including Lorenzo Ferrero and Bryan Johanson wrote a collaborative composition for organ and orchestra entitled Variazioni su un tema di Banchieri, which was first performed in Bologna on August 2 of that same year.

== Media ==
The Battle
Performed by Sylvia Kind on a harpsichord of the type made in the early 20th century

== Sources ==
- Cinzia Zotti, Le Sourire du moine: Adriano Banchieri da Bologna; Musicien, homme de lettres, pédagogue, équilibriste sur le fil des querelles du Seicento, Serre Éditeur, Nice, 2008.
