= Ignazio Donati =

Italian composer

Ignazio Donati (c. 1570 – 21 January 1638) was an Italian composer of the early Baroque era. He was one of the pioneers of the style of the concertato motet.

== Biography ==
Ignazio Donati was born possibly in Pesaro, though many thought in Casalmaggiore (now in the Province of Cremona). Little is known about his earliest years, but he must have had a thorough early musical training, and his succession of posts at various cathedrals in Italian towns is well documented: he served successively at Urbino, Pesaro, Fano, Ferrara, Casalmaggiore, Novara, and Lodi, eventually acquiring the prestigious post at Milan Cathedral in 1629, which he kept with one short break until his death.

Donati wrote "sacred concertos", motets, masses and psalm settings. Most of Donati's music is sacred, and his style tends towards the cheerful, the light, and the practical. He wrote motets using the new stile concertato pioneered by the composers of the Venetian School, though he was not associated with Venice himself. Most of his music is for two to five voices with instrumental accompaniment including basso continuo, and some of his works—for example a book of psalm settings—exist in several settings for different types of performance, with different instrumental and vocal forces. Ignazio Donati wrote the Sacri concentus and published it in Venice in 1612; here he defined the "cantar lontano" vocal practice.

In some of his music, he went even farther, and suggested multiple performance ideas—from singing only a very few parts, to using multiple choruses with instrumental doubling, based on the resources of the performing ensemble and the type of effect required by the performance occasion. This kind of practical advice is rarely found in the writings accompanying the music of the Venetian school composers, who had massive, virtuoso, well-paid ensembles at their disposal, but it would have been essential to the musical establishments at the small provincial towns in which Donati worked.

In addition to his concertato motets and other mixed instrumental-vocal music, he wrote some relatively conservative masses, which, however, are not in the polyphonic Palestrina style but find a middle-ground between the stile antico and the more modern harmonic practice.

== References and further reading ==
- Articles "Ignazio Donati," "concertato," "Motet" from The New Grove Dictionary of Music and Musicians, ed. Stanley Sadie. 20 vol. London, Macmillan Publishers Ltd., 1980. ISBN 1-56159-174-2
- Eleanor Selfridge-Field, Venetian Instrumental Music, from Gabrieli to Vivaldi. New York, Dover Publications, 1994. ISBN 0-486-28151-5
