= Carlo Milanuzzi =

Italian composer

Carlo Milanuzzi (c. 1590 – c. 1647) was an Italian composer of the early Baroque era.

== Life ==
Carlo Milanuzzi was born in Santa Natoglia, or Esanatoglia in the Marche region, to Milanuzzo and donna Felice, probably around 1590, but not after 1592, the starting-date of the Baptismal Books of the town, in which no documentation of his birth has been found. He spent most of his life in Venice. Though he was an Augustinian friar, he composed both sacred and secular music, and his work is very interesting particularly for the later development of the solo cantata. As Dinko Fabris wrote: «the collections of Ariose vaghezze published by Milanuzzi in Venice between 1622 and 1643 were a veritable mine of arias and proto-cantatas that had numerous affinities with Falconieri»; into the collections there are inserted many dances, and a quantity of them are for Spanish guitar. For example, the 'Terzo scherzo delle ariose vaghezze' of Milanuzzi contains 12 ballettos for solo voice and continuo, and 7 for guitar alone.

Two short arias by Francesco Monteverdi, elder son of Claudio Monteverdi, survive in Milanuzzi’s 'Quarto scherzo delle ariose vaghezze'.

Milanuzzi died perhaps around 1647, the date of his last work, Compieta intiera concertata con le Antifone, e Litanie della Beatiss. Vergine Madre di Dio.

== Works ==
=== Sacred ===
- Sacri rosarum flores, 1619;
- Vespertina psalmodia, 1619;
- Letanie della Beata Vergine, 1622;
- Armonia sacra di concerti, messa et canzoni, 1622;
- Sacra cetra concertata con affetti ecclesiastici, 1625;
- Concerto sacro di salmi intieri, 1629;
- Messe a 3 concertate, 1627;
- Hortus sacer deliciarum, 1636;
- Concerto sacro di salmi intieri, 1643;
- Compieta intiera concertata con le antifone, e Litanie BVM di Dio, 1647.

=== Secular ===
- Aurea corona de scherzi poetici, 1620;
- Primo scherzo delle ariose vaghezze, 1622;
- Secondo scherzo delle ariose vaghezze, 1622;
- Terzo scherzo delle ariose vaghezze, 1623;
- Quarto scherzo delle ariose vaghezze, 1624;
- Sesto libro delle ariose vaghezze, 1628;
- Settimo libro delle ariose vaghezze, 1630;
- Ottavo libro delle ariose vaghezze, 1635;
- Nono libro delle ariose vaghezze, commode da cantarsi, 1643.

In 1621 Carlo Milanuzzi also added the 'continuo' part to Pomponio Nenna’s Il primo libro de madrigali, 4 vv. The motet Anima miseranda, appeared in 'Ghirlanda sacra scielta da diuersi Eccellentissimi Compositori', an anthology by various authors edited in Venice, 1625.

== Sources, further reading ==
- Carlo Milanuzzi da Santa Natoglia - Sacred music, Critical Edition by Claudio Dall'Albero, Rugginenti, Milano, 2008.
- Jerome Roche/Roark Miller, Carlo Milanuzzi, in «New Grove Dictionary».
