= Epithalamium =

Song or poem celebrating a wedding

An epithalamium (/ˌɛpɪθəˈleɪmiəm/; Latin form of Greek ἐπιθαλάμιον epithalamion from ἐπί epi "upon," and θάλαμος thalamos "nuptial chamber") is a poem written specifically to celebrate the bride on the way to her marital chamber. This form continued in popularity through the history of the classical world; the Roman poet Catullus wrote a famous epithalamium, which may have been translated from or at least inspired by a now-lost work of Sappho. According to Origen, the Song of Songs might be an epithalamium on the marriage of Solomon with the Pharaoh's daughter.

== History ==
It was originally among the Greeks a song in praise of bride and bridegroom, sung by a number of boys and girls at the door of the nuptial chamber. According to the scholiast on Theocritus, one form was sung at night, and another in the morning to rouse the couple. In either case, as was natural, the main burden of the song consisted of invocations of blessing and predictions of happiness, interrupted from time to time by the ancient chorus of Hymen o Hymenaee. Among the Romans a similar custom was in vogue, but the song was sung by girls only, after the marriage guests had gone, and it contained material considered explicit by modern standards.

== Development as a literary form ==
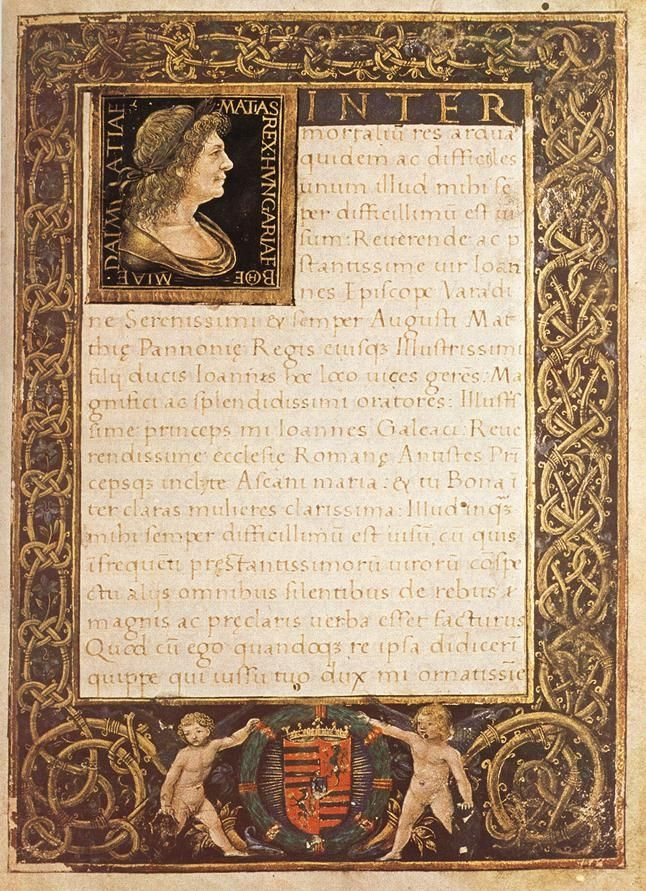
Marlianus Mediolanensis Ioannes Franciscus Epithalamium in nuptiis Blancae Mariae Sfortiae et Iohannis Corvini. Portrait of Matthias Corvinus, king of Hungary, Bohemia, Dalmatia.

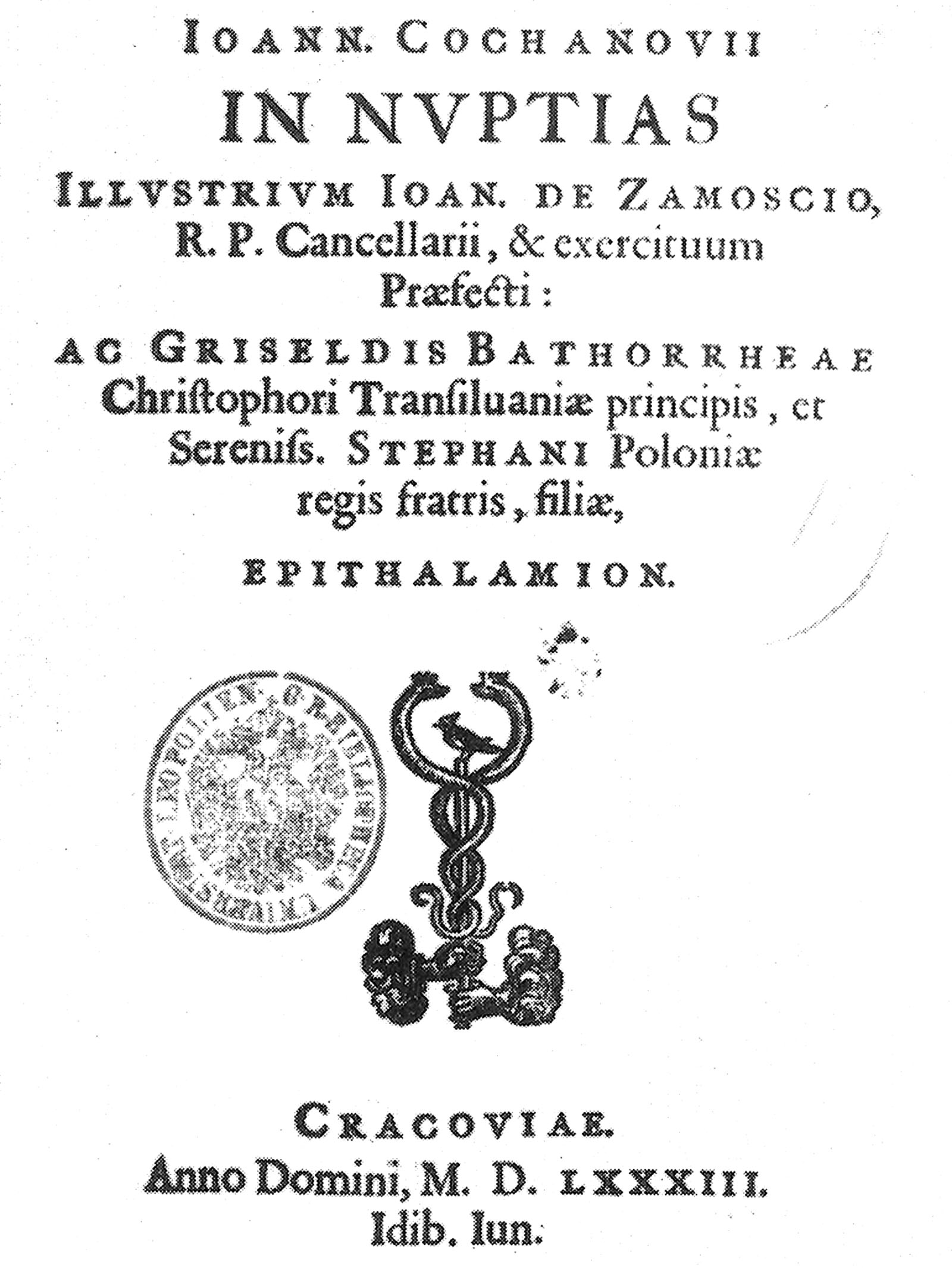
Titlepage of In Nuptias illustrium Joan. de Zamoscio, by Jan Kochanowski, Cracow, 1583

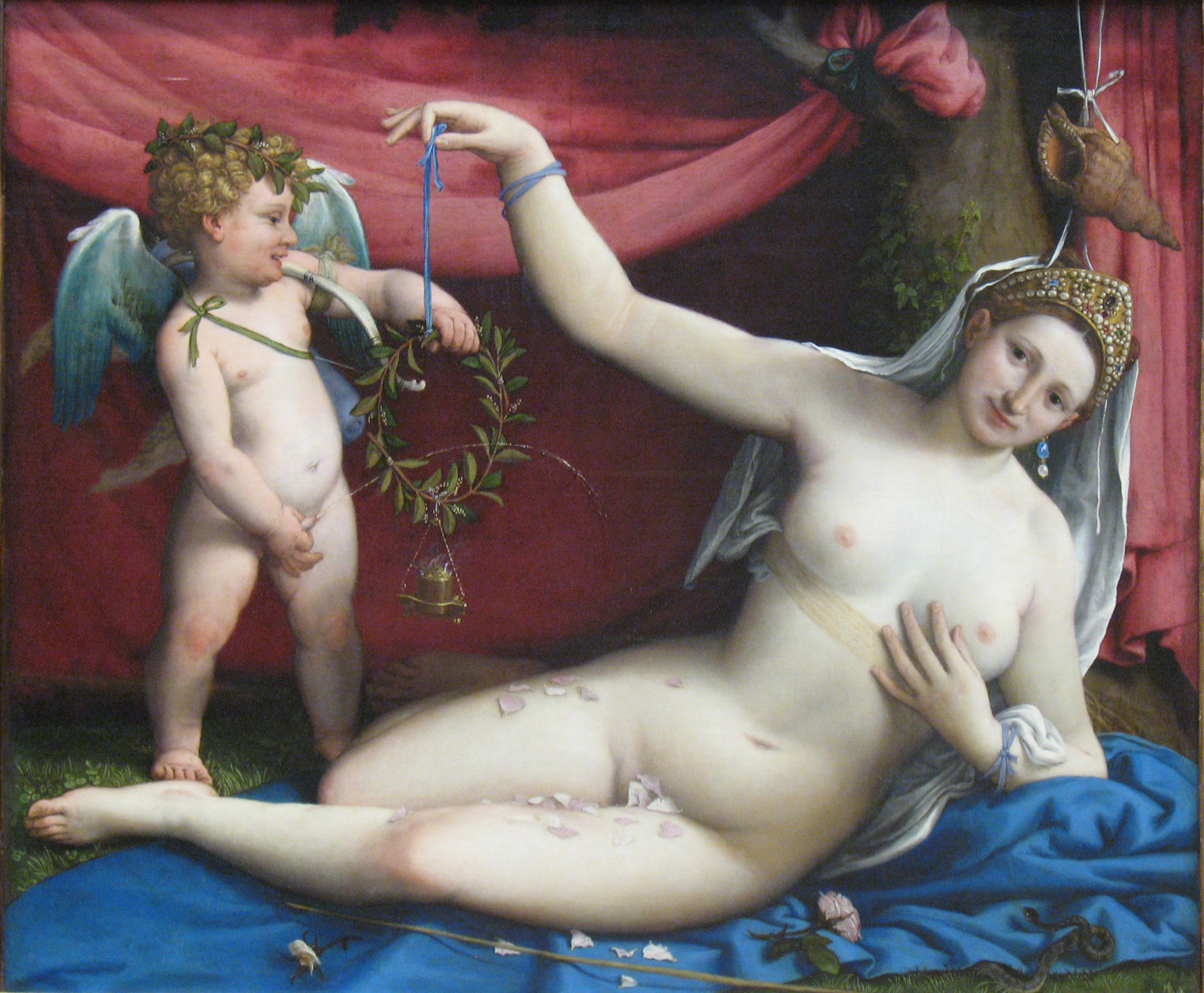
Venus and Cupid, Lorenzo Lotto, 1530, Metropolitan Museum of Art

In the hands of the poets the epithalamium was developed into a special literary form, and received considerable cultivation. Sappho, Anacreon, Stesichorus and Pindar are all regarded as masters of the species, but the finest example preserved in Greek literature is the 18th Idyll of Theocritus, which celebrates the marriage of Menelaus and Helen. In Latin, the epithalamium, imitated from Fescennine Greek models, was a base form of literature, until Catullus redeemed it and gave it dignity by modelling his Marriage of Thetis and Peleus on a lost ode of Sappho.

In later times Statius, Ausonius, Sidonius Apollinaris and Claudian are the authors of the best-known epithalamia in classical Latin; and they have been imitated by Julius Caesar Scaliger, Jacopo Sannazaro, and a whole host of modern Latin poets, with whom, indeed, the form was at one time in great favor.

In the Italian Renaissance, the per nozze (meaning 'for a wedding'; sometimes simply nozze; also nuptialia) emerged as a form of epithalamium, taking the form of a pamphlet, privately printed in small numbers on the occasion of a wedding. The tradition had declined by the 20th century. Collections of per nozze can be found in the London Library, the Biblioteca Teresiana, the Capretta collection at the National Central Library in Florence, the Casella collection at the State Library of Berlin, and the Mazzoni collection at Duke University.

The names of Ronsard, Malherbe and Scarron are especially associated with the genre in French literature, and Marino and Metastasio in Italian. Perhaps no poem of this class has been more universally admired than the pastoral Epithalamion of Edmund Spenser (1595), though he also has important rivals—Ben Jonson, Donne and Francis Quarles. Ben Jonson's friend, Sir John Suckling, is known for his epithalamium "A Ballad Upon a Wedding." In his ballad, Suckling playfully demystifies the usual celebration of marriage by detailing comic rustic parallels and identifying sex as the great leveler.

At the close of In Memoriam A.H.H., Tennyson has appended a poem, on the nuptials of his sister, which is strictly an epithalamium.

A. E. Housman in his collection Last Poems has an epithalamium (number XIV).

E. E. Cummings also returns to the form in his poem Epithalamion, which appears in his 1923 book Tulips and Chimneys. E. E. Cummings' Epithalamion consists of three seven octave parts, and includes numerous references to ancient Greece.

Louise Glück in her collection Descending Figure has an epithalamium in free verse, written from the bride's point of view.

The term is occasionally used beyond poetry, for example to describe Shakespeare's play A Midsummer Night's Dream.

== Music ==
Johann Wanning of Danzig is the composer of the first known musical epithalamium, a two-movement work for six voices, probably composed in the 1580s.

In Richard Wagner's Lohengrin, the "Bridal Chorus" (Treulich Geführt) of Act 3 is also called "Epithalamium" in several program notes: concert in London, 26 March 1855; concert in Paris, 25 January 1860; concert in Brussels, 24 March 1860.

The Epithalamium of Vindex is a popular aria from Néron, by Anton Rubinstein (composed in 1875–76, premiered in 1879).

The English composer Ralph Vaughan Williams (1872–1958) composed a choral work called Epithalamion consisting of 11 movements: The Prologue, Wake Now, The Calling of the Bride, The Minstrels, Procession of the Bride, The Temple Gates, The Bell Ringers, The Lover's Song, The Minstrel's Song, Song of the Winged Loves, and Prayer to Juno. Set for baritone, chorus, flute, piano, and strings, the work is based on Spenser's poem of the same name. As he often did, Vaughan Williams incorporated the flavour of English folk songs into these songs.

The 20th-century French organist-composer (and successor in his post to Charles Tournemire and César Franck) Jean Langlais (1907–1991) includes it as a title in his collection Ten Pieces for organ (No. 9). A late orchestral work by the Catalan composer Roberto Gerhard (1896–1970) is entitled Epithalamion.

French composer Jean-Yves Daniel-Lesur composed a suite of choral motets titled Le Cantique des Cantiques, of which the last is Épithalame. This has achieved lasting popularity following its televised première by Marcel Couraud’s Ensemble Vocal. It has been recorded by The Sixteen and others. A 1953 commission by André Jolivet is similarly titled.

Norwegian composer Fartein Valen composed an orchestral piece called Epithalamion Op. 19 in 1933, celebrating the wedding of his nephew.

American John Harbison composed the four movement work Olympic Dances, of which the second movement is entitled Epithalamion, in 1996 under commission from the College Band Directors National Association. Eugene Migliaro Corporon and the North Texas Wind Symphony recorded the work on the Wind Dances album released in 2000 on the Klavier label (K-11084).

In 2006, British composer John McCabe was commissioned by John Sell to write a piano piece for the 70th birthday of his wife Jane Wade. Epithalamium was given its world premiere in 2007 by Malcolm Binns at the Wigmore Hall in London.

== Painting ==
Epithalamia were also a painting genre popular in Italy during the Renaissance. These were nudes presented as wedding gifts, which were intended to wish newlyweds happiness and fertility. Venus and Cupid was a common subject. In one notable example, Lorenzo Lotto depicted Cupid as a puer mingens urinating on Venus, a symbolic gesture of fertility in Renaissance art.

Although epithalamia existed only in poetic form during antiquity, during the Renaissance it was believed that presenting gifts of erotic paintings was an ancient Roman tradition.

== See also ==
- Poetry
