= Melchior Franck =

German composer

- Born: c. 1579; Zittau
- Died: June 1, 1639; Coburg
- Education: University of Wittenberg
- Occupation: Composer

Melchior Franck (c. 1579 – 1 June 1639) was a German composer of the late Renaissance and early Baroque eras. He was a hugely prolific composer of Lutheran church music, especially motets, and assisted in bringing the stylistic innovations of the Venetian School north across the Alps into Germany.

== Life ==
Details of his early life are sparse, as is common for composers of the time. He was born in Zittau, and possibly studied with Christoph Demantius there, and also later with Adam Gumpelzhaimer in Augsburg. By 1601 Franck was in Nuremberg, as a music teacher; there he met Hans Leo Hassler, and learned from him both the Venetian polychoral style and the polyphonic style of the high Renaissance, both of which he incorporated into his own composition.

In 1602 he took a position as Kapellmeister in Coburg to Prince Johann Casimir, and he remained in Coburg for the rest of his life. For the earlier portion of this time, the situation was ideal for him; he was supported by his patron, and had the resources necessary to carry on his composing. The Thirty Years' War devastated the region around Coburg; in addition to the military depredations, typhus brought by the armies depopulated the entire region and ruined the economy. Franck was able to make a living throughout this period as a musician, unlike his contemporary at Halle, Samuel Scheidt, who lost his Kapellmeister post. Franck's wife and two of his children died.

== Works ==
Franck was a popular composer, and wrote an enormous amount of music, including more than 40 books of motets for a total of over 600 motets alone; in addition he wrote secular songs, including quodlibets, psalm settings, bicinia, tricinia, instrumental dances and numerous miscellaneous pieces.

His motets are varied in style. Many are chorale motets, an exclusively Protestant variation of the motet, and these are written in German. Almost all use the late Renaissance idiom of Lassus, with carefully controlled dissonance and smoothly flowing polyphony. Some are simple and homophonic, and pay unusually close attention to text setting (this was also a trend in the music of the concurrent Catholic Counter-Reformation, and represented a reaction against the music of the previous generations). Others are written in the polychoral style related to the Venetian practice, with the important difference that there is no spatial separation of the choirs: the antiphonal parts are all within the group. However the most unusual is a collection from 1602 called Contrapuncti, which are early examples of fugues. They are strictly contrapuntal, and include real answers; occasionally the points of imitation use stretto. Each successive point of imitation uses as its text the successive verse of the chorale being set.

Even though most of his motets use frankly Renaissance contrapuntal idiom, he often used the basso continuo, a relatively recent innovation of the early Baroque, and also used instrumental doublings of the vocal parts.

Franck was a conservative composer who was contemporary with the more famous, and much more progressive, Heinrich Schütz; however his works were popular and often reprinted during his lifetime.
