= List of compositions by Girolamo Frescobaldi =

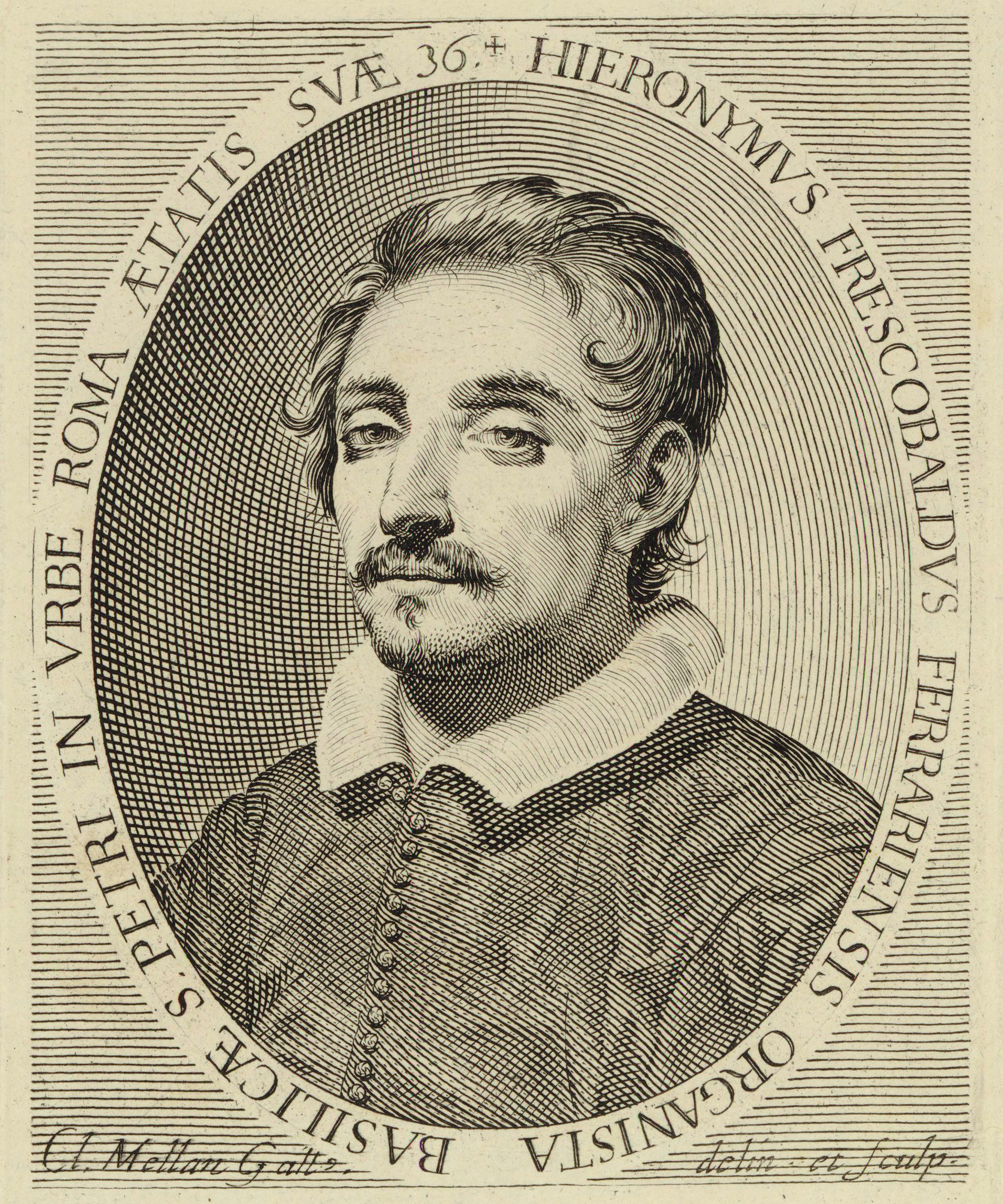
Girolamo Frescobaldi in a 1619 engraving by Claude Mellan

The Italian composer Girolamo Frescobaldi (1583–1643) wrote music during the late Renaissance era and Baroque period. The following list of compositions is organized thematically, and within sections entries are arranged chronologically. Although some of the collections were published more than once, only dates of first editions are given. The numbers (preceded by F) that follow the compositions refer to the Frescobaldi Thematic Catalogue Online (FTCO).

== List of compositions ==
=== Keyboard music ===
The following collections appeared during the composer's lifetime:

- Il primo libro delle fantasie a quattro (Milan, 1608): 12 fantasies, F 6.01–6.12
- Toccate e partite d'intavolatura di cimbalo, libro primo (Rome, 1615): 12 toccatas, 4 partitas, 4 correntes (revised in 1637 with additions), F 2.01–2.37
- Recercari et canzoni franzese fatte sopra diverse oblighi in partitura, libro primo (Rome, 1615): 10 ricercars, 5 canzonas, F 9.01–9.15
- Il primo libro di capricci fatti sopra diversi soggetti et arie in partitura (Rome, 1624): 12 capriccios, F 4.01–4.12
- Il secondo libro di toccate, canzone, versi d'hinni, Magnificat, gagliarde, correnti et altre partite d'intavolatura di cembalo et organo (Rome, 1627): 11 toccatas, 6 canzonas, 4 hymns, 3 Magnificats, 5 galliards, 6 correntes and 4 partitas (revised in 1637). F 3.01–3.40
- Fiori musicali di diverse compositioni, toccate, kyrie, canzoni, capricci, e recercari, in partitura (Venice, 1635): 3 organ masses, 2 capriccios, F 12.01–12.47

A single posthumous print consisting entirely of unpublished music:

- Canzoni alla francese in partitura, [libro quarto] (Venice, 1645): 11 canzonas, F 10.01–10.11

Frescobaldi's works also appeared in the Nova instructio pro pulsandis organis, spinettis, manuchordiis series of prints in the 1670s, including one unicum: F16.71.

Manuscript sources for Frescobaldi's keyboard music include the following:

- D-Mbs Mus.ms.1581: 12 canzonas, F 9.11–9.15, 15.33, 15.35–15.41
- F-Pn rés.Vm^{7} 675 (Manuscrit Bauyn): 2 capriccios, 1 trio, 1 fantasia, F 15.26.01, 15.26.02 15.27, 15.28
- F-Pn rés. Vmc. ms. 64: 1 toccata, 7 dances and miscellaneous pieces. This manuscript has been identified as a Frescobaldi autograph. F 13.15–13.22
- Fioretti di Frescobaldi, GB-Lbl Add.40080: 11 canzonas, 1 toccata. This manuscript is in the hand of Nicolò Borbone, Frescobaldi's assistant and engraver for the two books of toccatas. F 14.15–14.26
- Lbl Add.36661: 3 toccatas, 2 canzonas, F 15.51–15.55
- I-RAc Classense 545: 2 capriccios, 1 canzona, 1 verset, F 15.17–15.20
- V-CVbav Chigi Q.IV.29: 14 miscellaneous compositions and sketches. This manuscript has been identified as a Frescobaldi autograph. F 13.01–13.14

And finally, the other so-called Chigi manuscripts, V-CVbav Chigi Q.IV.24 to Q.IV.29 and Chigi.VIII.205–206, include numerous works believed to be by Frescobaldi.

=== Other instrumental music ===
- 3 canzonas a 4, 5, and 8 (1608), F 8.52–8.54
- In partitura, il primo libro delle canzoni a 1–4, bc, per sonare con ogni sorte di stromenti (Rome, 1628): 38 ensemble canzonas, edited by Bartolomeo Grassi. Two different editions appeared in 1628, with slightly different contents; a 1634 Venice print (Canzoni da sonare) contains 40 canzonas, removing some of the old works and adding 10 new ones. F 8.01–8.51

=== Vocal music ===
- Il primo libro de' madrigali (Antwerp, 1608): 19 madrigals for 5 voices, F 5.01–5.19
- Liber secundus diversarum modulationum (Rome, 1627): 32 motets, F 11.01–11.31
- Primo libro d'arie musicali per cantarsi (Florence, 1630): 23 arias for 1–3 voices and basso continuo, F 7.01–7.23
- Secondo libro d'arie musicali per cantarsi (Florence, 1630): 20 arias for 1–3 voices and basso continuo, F 7.24–7.43

Additionally, a few pieces were published in anthologies:

- Peccavi super numerum, motet for 3 voices and basso continuo (1616), F 11.40
- Angelus ad pastores, motet for 3 voices and basso continuo (1618), F 11.41
- Alla gloria alli honori, aria for 2 voices and basso continuo (1621), F 7.45
- Ego sum panis vivus, motet for 3 voices and basso continuo (1621), F 11.24
- O bell'occhi che guerrieri, aria for voice and basso continuo (1621), F 7.44
- Era l'anima mia, aria for 2 voices and basso continuo (1622), F 7.46
- Jesu rex admirabilis, motet for 4 voices and basso continuo (1625), F 11.42

Two polychoral masses are attributed to Frescobaldi by some scholars, but the attribution remains controversial:

- Missa sopra l'aria della monica, F 1.01
- Missa sopra l'aria di Fiorenza, F 1.02
