= Enrico Baiano =

Italian musician

Enrico Baiano (Naples, October 2, 1960) is an Italian harpsichordist and fortepianist, known on the international stage as a virtuoso and strict interpreter of early music.

== Biography ==
He graduated in piano and composition at Conservatorio San Pietro a Majella, Naples. He subsequently specialized in harpsichord, clavichord and fortepiano at Conservatorio Giuseppe Verdi, Milan.

He has performed at the most renowned early music festivals in Europe, Israel and Japan with a repertoire ranging from 16th to 21st century. He has taken part in various Italian and European television and radio broadcasts and in two documentary films directed by Francesco Leprino: "Sul nome B.A.C.H." and “A daring game” (on Domenico Scarlatti).

He is one of the major scholars and interpreters of the music of the Neapolitan masters of the seventeenth century (Giovanni de Macque, Ascanio Mayone, Giovanni Maria Trabaci, Giovanni Salvatore, Gregorio Strozzi, etc.), Girolamo Frescobaldi, Johann Jakob Froberger, Alessandro Scarlatti, Domenico Scarlatti, Johann Sebastian Bach. Other authors to whom he dedicates in-depth study are the Elizabethan virginalists, Henry Purcell, Louis Couperin, Jean-Philippe Rameau, Carl Philipp Emanuel Bach, Franz Joseph Haydn, Wolfgang Amadeus Mozart, Muzio Clementi, Ludwig van Beethoven.

Baiano has earned a number of international awards including the Deutsche Schallplattenpreis, Diapason d'Or, Choc de la Musique and Platte des Monats. In 2024 he was awarded the Franco Abbiati Prize.

He was harpsichord professor at the Conservatorio Alessandro Scarlatti, Palermo and at Conservatorio Domenico Cimarosa, Avellino. He is currently professor of harpsichord and historical keyboards at the Conservatorio Santa Cecilia, Rome .

He is a member of the Advisory Panel of the Historical Keyboard Society of North America .

== Publications ==
- Method for Harpsichord, Ut Orpheus, Bologna 2010 (in English; also in Italian, French, German, Spanish and Japanese).
- Il discorso musicale, in La narrazione al plurale (edited by Simona Messina), Gaia Editrice, 2012.
- (with Marco Moiraghi) Le sonate di Domenico Scarlatti - Testo, contesto, interpretazione, LIM, Lucca 2014.
- Mille fughe, pause e riprese – Clavicembalisti napoletani, in Storia della Musica e del Teatro a Napoli-Il Seicento (edited by Francesco Cotticelli e Paologiovanni Maione),Turchini Edizioni, Napoli 2019.
- Piccola introduzione al Clavicembalo ben Temperato, in I Quaderni del Cimarosa (a cura di Marina Marino e Massimo Signorini), V-2019.
- Bach and the Seconda Pratica, in Bach e l’Italia (in English). Scambi, sguardi, convergenze (a cura di Chiara Bertoglio e Maria Borghesi), LIM - Lucca 2020.
- The Sonatas of Domenico Scarlatti from the perspective of Italian 17th century Toccata (in English), proceedings from XIV congress ‘Diego Fernández’ in Domenico Scarlatti: Forwards and Backwards, (edited by Luisa Morales), FIMTE, Almería 2024.

== Selected discography ==
- 1995 - Pietro Domenico Paradisi, Sonatas for harpsichord - 1754 (Glossa).
- 1996 - Johann Jakob Froberger, Diverse curiose partite (Symphonia).
- 1998 - Antonio de Cabezon, Obras de Musica para Tecla (Glossa).
- 1999 - Domenico Scarlatti, Sonate per clavicembalo K46, K109, K126, K175, K181, K217, K232, K233, K248, K249, K295, K296, K394, K395, K402, K439, K516 (Symphonia).
- 2000 - Antonio Vivaldi, Concertos for harpsichord solo (Panclassics).
- 2001 - Musica al tempo di Luca Giordano - Il cembalo nella Napoli del'600 (Symphonia).
- 2003 - Girolamo Frescobaldi, Toccate, Partite, Canzoni (Symphonia).
- 2008 - Domenico Scarlatti, Sonate per clavicembalo K3, K24, K69, K99, K113, K115, K118, K119, K120, K132, K148, K149, K184, K213, K214, K215, K216, K268 (Symphonia).
- 2009 Domenico Scarlatti, Sonatas (harpsichord and fortepiano) K96, K124, K125, K141, K386, K387, K426, K427, K445, K481, K482, K 516, K517, K544, K545, K546, K547 (Stradivarius 33844).
- 2022 - Johann Sebastian Bach, Das Wohltemperirte Clavier I & II (harpsichord, clavichord and fortepiano - Da Vinci Classic C00656).
- 2024 - (with Tommaso Rossi) - Georg Frideric Handel, Sonatas for reorder/traversiere and thoroughbass (Stradivarius)
- 2024 - Johann Sebastian Bach - Toccatas BWV 910-916 (Da Vinci Classic)
