= Rocco Rodio =

Italian composer

Rocco Rodio (c. 1535 – 1607) was an Italian Renaissance composer and theorist, best known for his sacred works and keyboard ricercares.

== Biography ==
He was born in Bari and apparently led a cosmopolitan life, at some point working at the Polish court, and then possibly settling in Naples. Popular among his colleagues, Rodio was a member of Carlo Gesualdo's academy at Naples, organized a Camerata di Propaganda per l'Affinamento del Gusto Musicale together with other Neapolitan musicians, and also probably cultivated connections with Polish and Spanish composers.

Rodio's work, both in music and in music theory, was progressive for its time and shows a competent composer. His treatise Regole di musica circulated widely both in Italy and outside its borders. Rodio's Libro primo di ricercate (1575) is the earliest surviving keyboard music notated in score. It contains five ricercars and four fantasias, all marked with a highly individual harmonic language. This print, together with Antonio Valente's Intavolatura de cimbalo, represents the earliest works of the so-called Neapolitan school, to which later important composers such as Ascanio Mayone and Giovanni Maria Trabaci belonged.

== List of works ==
=== Music ===
- Missarum decem liber primus, masses for 4–6 voices (Rome, 1562)
- Libro primo di ricercate, keyboard works (Naples, 1575)
- Il secondo libro di madrigali, madrigals for 4 voices (Venice, 1587)
- Duetti (1589), lost
- Il primo libro di madrigali, lost
- canzonas, motets, and other pieces in manuscript copies

=== Writings ===
- Regole di musica di Rocco Rodio sotto brevissime risposte ad alcuni dubij propostigli da un cavaliero, intorno alle varie opinioni de contrapontisti con la dimostratione de tutti i canoni sopra il canto fermo (Naples, 1600)
