= Antonio Valente =

Italian composer

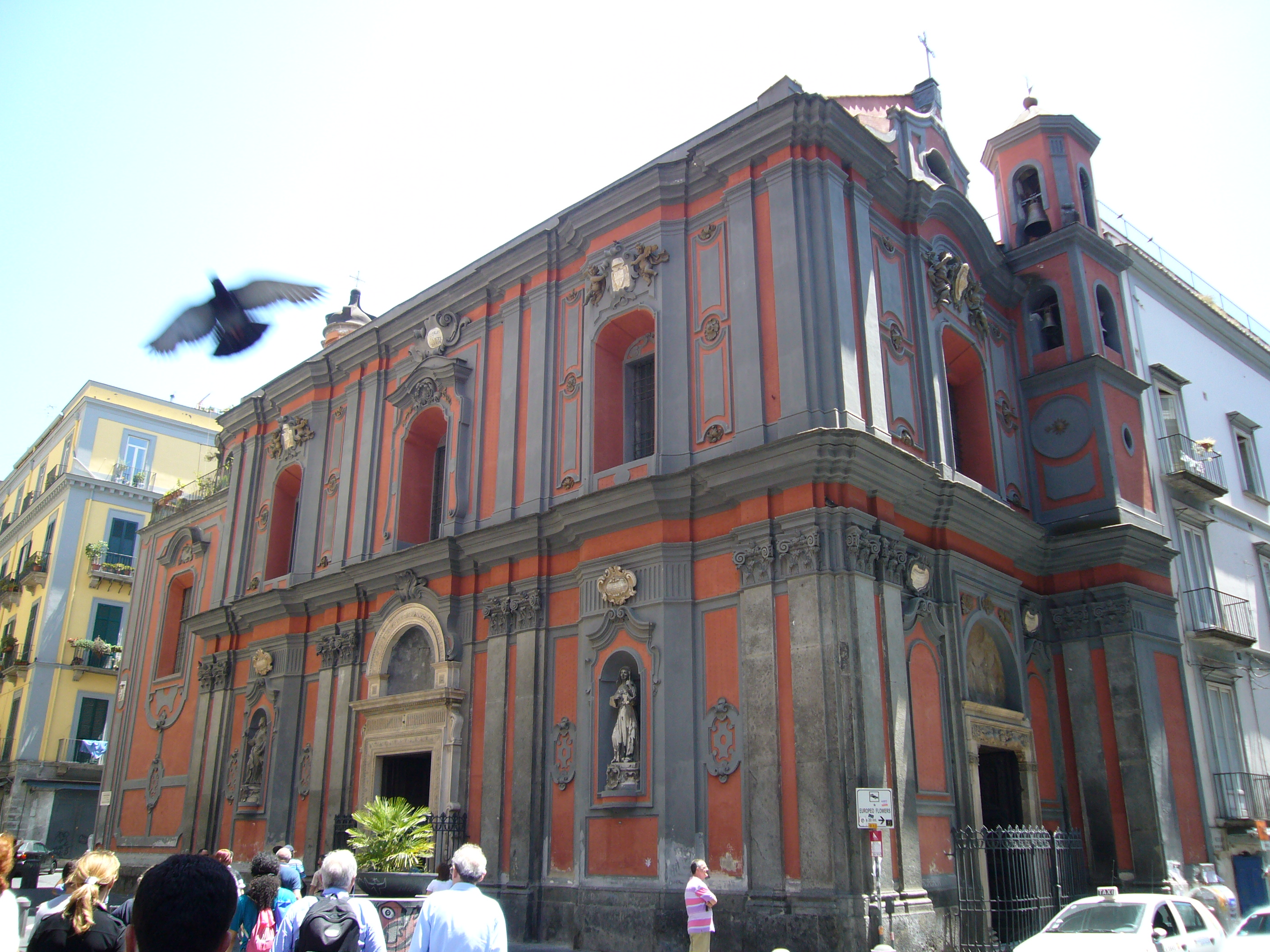
Sant'Angelo a Nilo in Naples, where Valente worked

Antonio Valente (c. 1520 – died somewhere between 1596 and 1601) was an Italian Renaissance organist and composer.

== Biography ==
It is believed that Antonio Valente was born in c. 1520; although the exact date and place of his birth are unknown. He was principally active in the city of Naples; although documents indicate that he was naturalized citizen of that city and was not born there. He was blind from early childhood and served as organist of Sant'Angelo a Nilo in Naples from November 1565 to May 1580. During that time he published two collections of keyboard instruments music: Intavolatura de cimbalo (1 fantasia, 6 ricercares, Salve regina, 3 intabulations, 6 sets of variations, and 3 dances; 1575) and Versi spirituali (43 versets; 1580).

Valente's second collection is historically important as one of the earliest instances of liturgical music free from any ties with the chant. Versi spirituali provides a wealth of diverse, freely composed pieces that cover the entire liturgy—the Mass and the Daily Offices. Valente's first collection of 1575 is also a major landmark in the history of Italian keyboard music, as together with Rocco Rodio's Libro di ricercate (1575) it constitutes the earliest work of the so-called Neapolitan school, which later produced composers such as Ascanio Mayone and Giovanni Maria Trabaci.

Lo ballo dell'Intorcia (ogg format)
A piece from Intavolatura de cimbalo (1575)

21st century scholarship uncovered documents at the Chiesa di Santa Maria a Cancello which indicate that Valente had seven children with his wife, Laura Palomba, that were baptized at this church between February 1576 and March 1596. A 1601 publication by one of his contemporaries states that he was no longer living. He died somewhere between 1596 and 1601.

== Works ==
- Intavolatura de cimbalo, for harpsichord
- Versi spirituali sopra tutti le note, for organ
