= Gebundener Stil =

Gebundener Stil is a German-language music term that refers to a type of Baroque music composition that flourished during the 17th- and early 18th-centuries. These works all utilized species counterpoint which exhibited a rigid contrapuntal style. Genres of music which fit under this term include ricercars, chorale preludes, and fugues.
