= Secondo libro di toccate (Frescobaldi) =

1627 keyboard music collection by Girolamo Frescobaldi

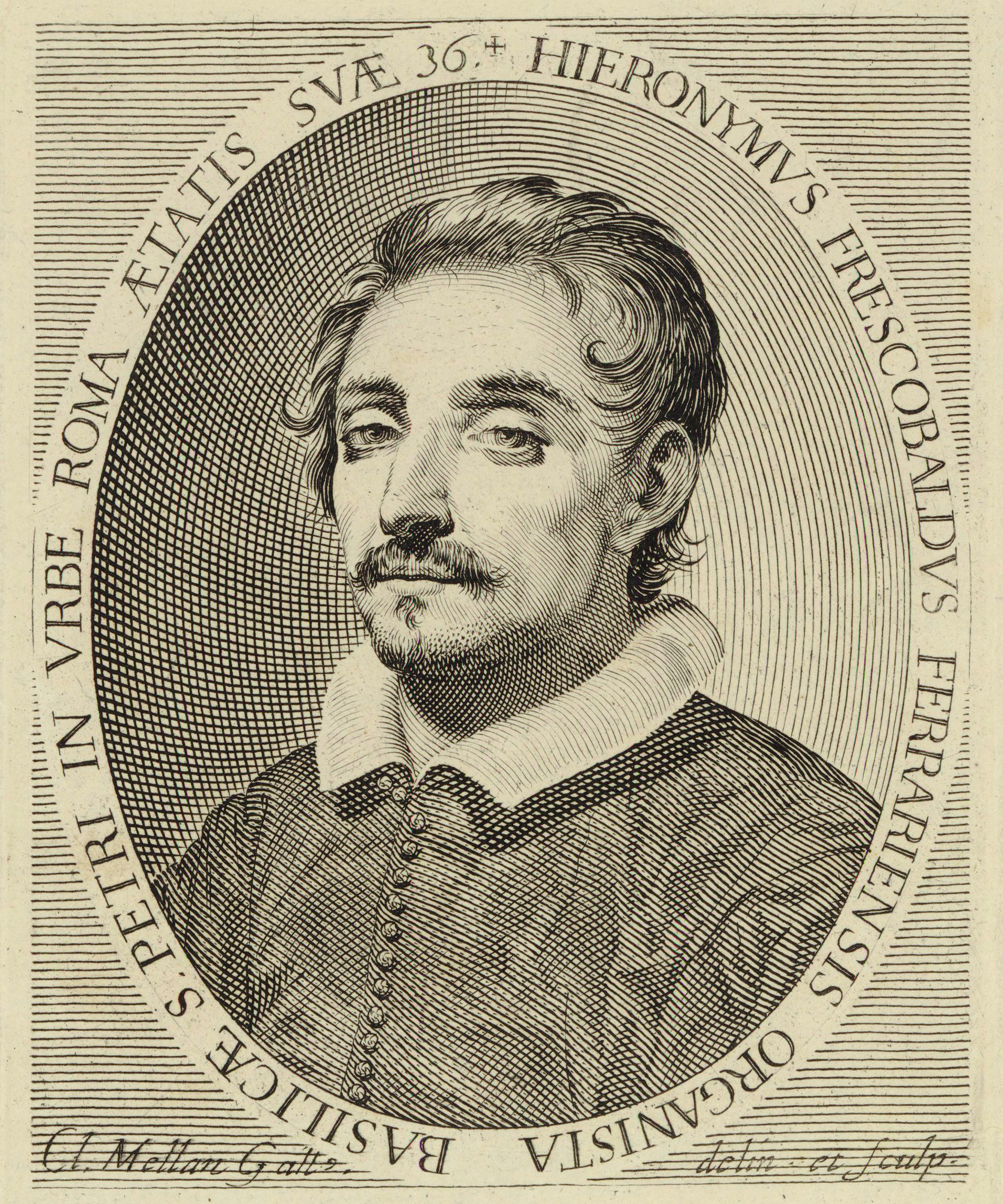
Girolamo Frescobaldi in a 1619 engraving by Claude Mellan

Il secondo libro di toccate (lit. 'The Second Book of Toccatas') is a collection of keyboard music by Girolamo Frescobaldi, first published in 1627. A work of immense historical importance, it includes the first known chaconne and passacaglia, as well as the earliest set of variations on an original theme (i.e. not a popular song, as in all earlier music). Il secondo libro di toccate is widely regarded as a high point in Frescobaldi's oeuvre.

== History ==
Like Frescobaldi's first book of toccatas (1615), Il secondo libro di toccate contains compositions in various forms:

- 11 toccatas
- 6 canzonas
- 4 hymns
- 3 Magnificats
- 5 gagliarde (galliards)
- 6 correntes
- 4 partitas

Accordingly, the full title of the collection is Il secondo libro di toccate, canzone, versi d'hinni, Magnificat, gagliarde, correnti et altre partite d'intavolatura di cembalo et organo. It was first published in Rome in 1627, when Frescobaldi worked as organist of St. Peter's Basilica. The print was engraved by Nicolò Borbone, musician and instrument builder with whom Frescobaldi had worked since at least 1613. The composer dedicated the book to Monsignor Luigi Gallo, Bishop of Ancona and nuncio of Savoy, a skilled keyboard player who may have been one of his pupils. A second printing appeared in 1637, identical to the first, except without the ostinato variations.

Il secondo libro di toccate introduces two important deviations from Frescobaldi's usual practice. First and foremost, it contains several liturgical pieces, the composer's first forays into the field of sacred keyboard music (although he did compose sacred vocal music: two collections of motets, one of which is lost, were published in late 1620s, and standalone motets survive in manuscripts; Frescobaldi would later publish a large volume of liturgical organ pieces, Fiori musicali, one of his most highly regarded and influential works). Secondly, the book contains Frescobaldi's only known intabulation (of Jacques Arcadelt's madrigal Ancidetemi, pur), perhaps included as a homage to one of the oldest forms of keyboard music.
