= 1689 in music =

The year 1689 in music involved some significant events.

== Events ==
- September 1 – Johann Joseph Vilsmayr begins work at the Hofkapelle in Salzburg.
- Nicolaus Bruhns is appointed town organist at Husum.

== Published popular music ==
- Henry Purcell – Musick's Handmaid

== Classical music ==
- Jean-Henri d'Anglebert – Pièces de clavecin
- Giovanni Battista Bassani – Giona (oratorio)
- Giovanni Paolo Colonna – Sacre lamentationi della Settimana santa a voce sola
- Arcangelo Corelli – Op. 3, 12 trio sonatas
- Michel Richard Delalande
  - Audite caeli, S.7
  - Quam dilecta S.12
  - De Profundis S.23
- Domenico Gabrielli
  - Seven ricercari for solo cello
  - Cello Sonata No. 1 and No. 2
- Johann Caspar Kerll – Missae sex, cum instrumentis concertantibus, a collection of concertato masses
- Johann Kuhnau – Neuer Clavier-Übung, erster Theil
- Michel Lambert
  - Airs de cour
  - Airs à une, II. III. et IV. parties avec la basse-continue
- Giovanni Battista Vitali – Artificii musicali (Op. 13)

== Opera ==
- Antonio Caldara – L'Argene
- Henri Desmarest – La Diane de Fontainebleau
- Henry Purcell – Dido and Aeneas (libretto by Nahum Tate, first performed in London)
- Poul Christian Schindler – Der vereinigte Götterstreit
- Agostino Steffani – La Lotta d'Ercole con Acheloo

== Births ==
- February 27 – Pietro Gnocchi, composer (died 1775)
- September 30 – Jacques Aubert, composer (died 1753)
- November 3 – Johann Joseph Ignaz Brentner, composer (died 1742)
- December 23 – Joseph Bodin de Boismortier, composer (died 1755)
- date unknown – Edward Purcell, organist and co-founder of the Royal Society of Musicians (died 1740)

== Deaths ==
- November 13 – Philipp von Zesen, hymn-writer (born 1619)
