= Giovanni Maria Trabaci =

Italian composer

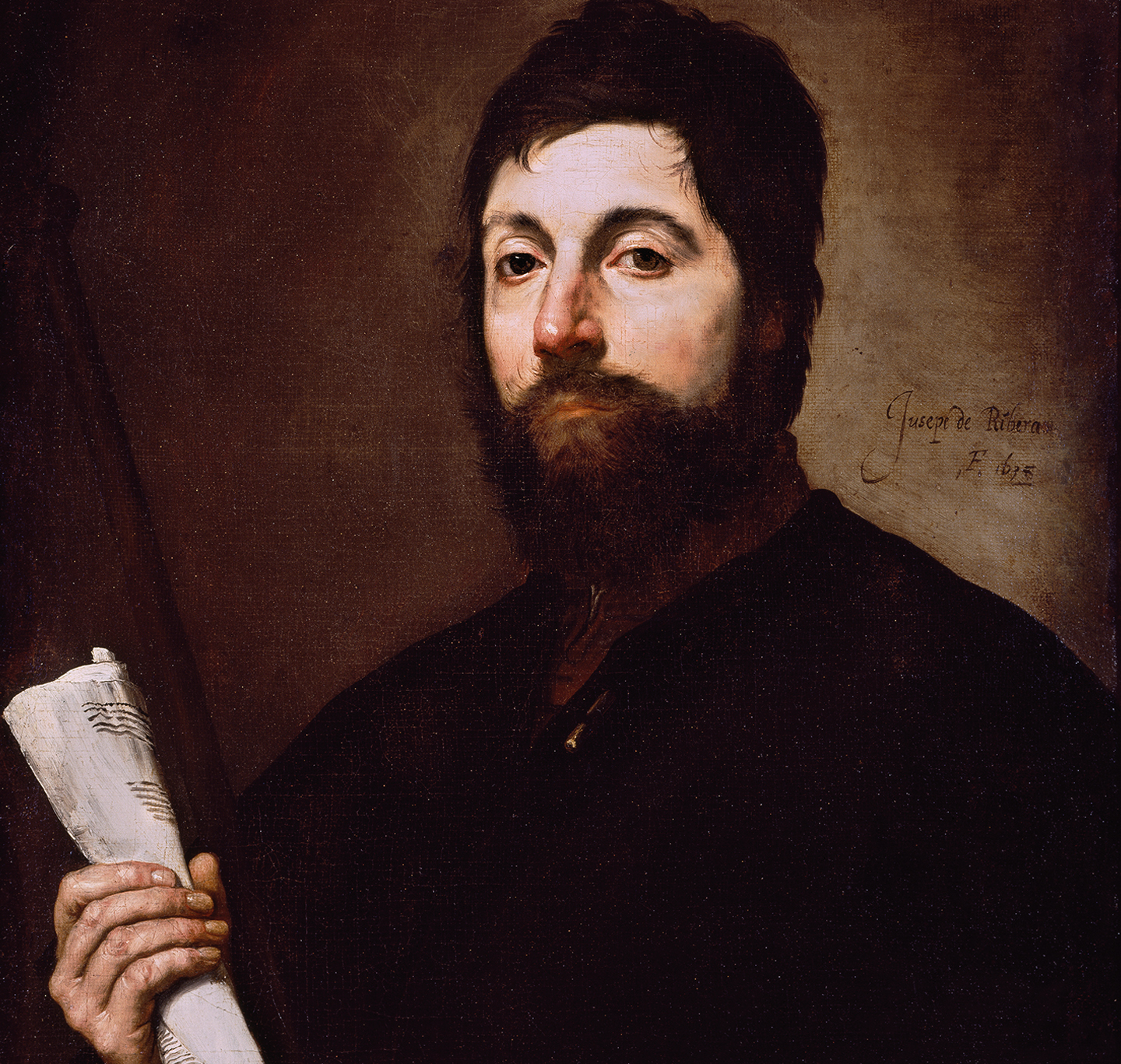
Alleged portrait of Giovanni Maria Trabaci, Jusepe de Ribera

Giovanni Maria Trabaci (ca. 1575 – 31 December 1647) was an Italian composer and organist. He was a prolific composer, with some 300 surviving works preserved in more than 10 publications; he was especially important for his keyboard music.

== Biography ==
Trabaci was born in Montepeloso (now Irsina, near Matera). Nothing is known about his early life. On 1 December 1594 he was appointed tenor at Santissima Annunziata Maggiore in Naples, but already in 1597 he must have been known as an organist and organ expert, because he was invited that year to test the organ of Oratorio dei Filippini. He served as organist there for a while, and then became, in 1601, organist to the Spanish viceroys at the Chapel Royal of Naples. The second organist was Ascanio Mayone, and Giovanni de Macque was maestro di cappella. Trabaci succeeded Macque in 1614 after the latter's death, and held the post for the rest of his life. Between 1625 and 1630 he also worked at the Oratorio dei Filippini.

Trabaci was most noted for his keyboard works, which include ricercares, canzonas and toccatas collected in two publications (Libro primo..., 1603, Libro secondo..., 1615). His bold harmonic language, with unexpected modulations to distant keys, and experiments with structure in these works influenced Girolamo Frescobaldi. He wrote 2 pieces in that experimental idiom: His "Durezze et ligature" and "Consonanze stravaganti" (1603). He also wrote numerous sacred vocal works, but these are, in general, more conservative. His 1602 book of motets, Motectorum, features advanced harmonic writing and may have influenced Carlo Gesualdo's 1603 Sacrae cantiones.

In July 2025, the first edition of Giovanni Maria Trabaci Festival, celebrating the life and work of the composer, took place in his native town of Irsina (formerly Montepeloso), with lectures and early music concerts by the harpist Mara Galassi and harpsichordist Aleksander Mocek, as well as workshops in painting.

== Sacred vocal music ==
- 21 Motectorum, per 5-6 voci e 8 voci
- 8 Rithmis, per 5 voci
- 3 Missarum et 6 motectorum, per 4 voci
- 21 Psalmarum pro vesperis et completario totius anni, cum 4 antiphonis et 4 missae, per 4 voci
- Sylvae amonicae
- 23 Hinni e 23 motetti, per 8 voci e basso continuo
- 13 Psalmi vespertini cum 6 rithmis, per 4 voci
- 13 Motetti, per 5 voci (1634)
- 4 Passionem
- 4 Messe
- Laudaum, per 4 voci
- Salmo, per 4 voci

== Secular vocal music ==
- Il primo libro de (21) madrigali (per 5 voci
- (14) Villanelle et arie alla napolitana a 3 e a 4 (per 2-3 voci
- Il secondo libro de (20) madrigali (per 5 voci
- Madrigale per 5 voci
- Solo aria e aria, per 3 voci

== Keyboard music ==
- Ricercate, canzone francese, capricci, canti fermi, gagliarde, partite diverse, toccate, durezze e ligature, e un madrigale passagiato nel fine (1603, Napoli)
- Il secondo libro de ricercate & altri varij capricci [includes 100 versi sopra li Otto Finali Ecclesiastici] (1615, Napoli)
