= Il Primo Libro delle Canzoni =

Collection of instrumental canzonas by Girolamo Frescobaldi

- by Girolamo Frescobaldi
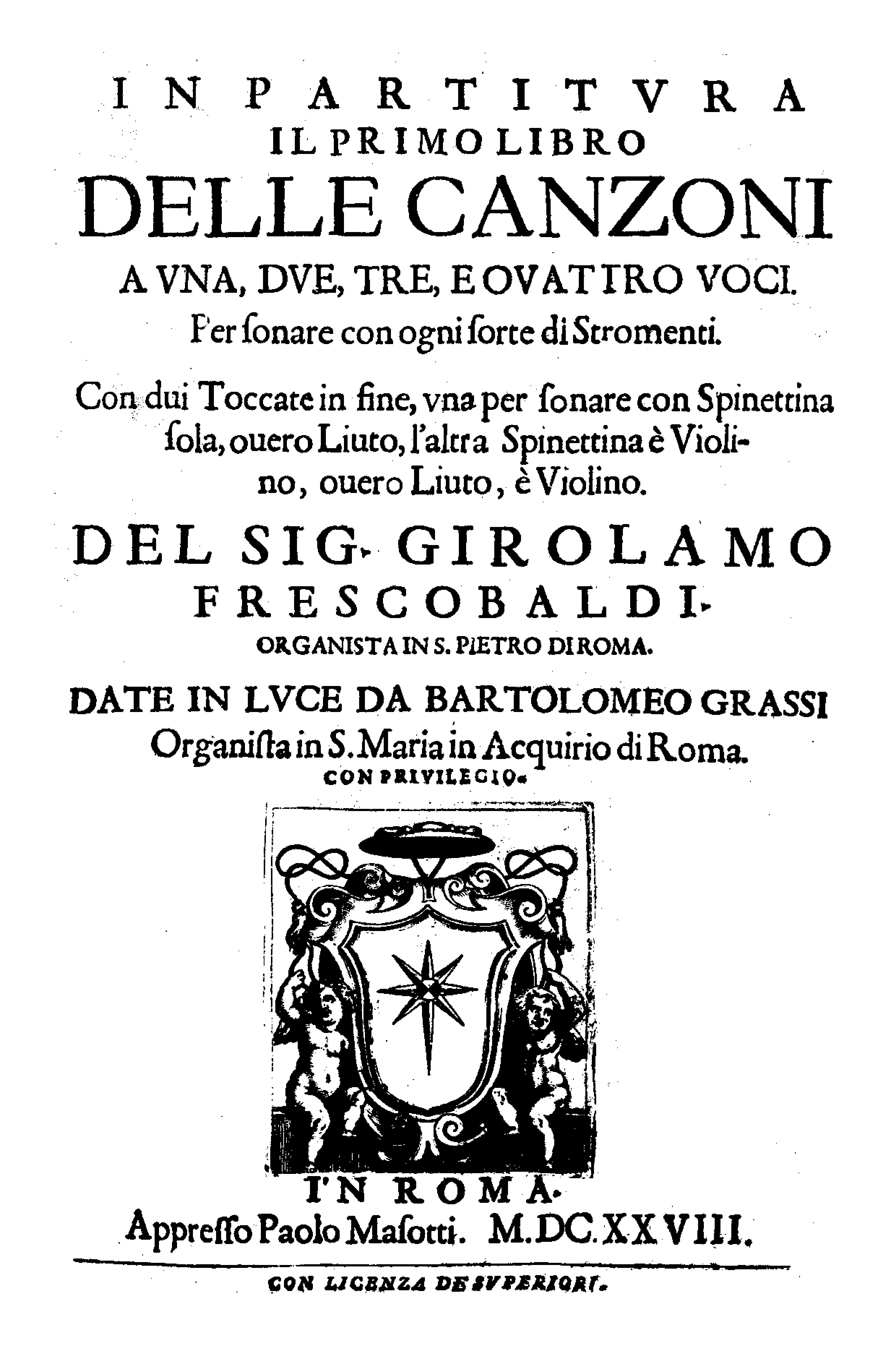
- Title page of the Masotti edition in score, Rome 1628
- Full title: Masotti 1628: Il Primo Libro delle Canzoni ad una, due, tre e quattro voci; Per sonare con ogni sorte di Stromenti; Robletti 1628: Il Primo Libro delle Canzoni ad una, due, trè e quattro voci; Accomodate, per sonare ogni sorte di stromenti; Vincenti 1634: Canzoni da Sonare ad una due tre, et quattro; Con il Basso Continuo
- Genre: Baroque canzona
- Published: 1628, Rome: partbooks, Robletti; 1628, Rome: score, Masotti; 1634, Venice: partbooks, Vincenti
- Scoring: one to four instruments with basso continuo

Il Primo Libro delle Canzoni is a collection of instrumental Baroque canzonas by the Ferrarese organist and composer Girolamo Frescobaldi. It was published in two different editions in Rome in 1628, and re-issued with substantial revisions in Venice in 1634. The three editions of the Primo Libro contain a total of forty-eight canzonas for one, two, three or four instrumental voices in various combinations, all with basso continuo; as a result of revisions, sixteen of the canzonas exist in two substantially different versions.

== Background ==
Frescobaldi published intensively in the late 1620s. His Capricci for organ were re-published in 1626, his second book of Toccate for keyboard and his Liber secundus of motets appeared in 1627, the two editions of the Primo Libro in 1628, and the Arie musicali in 1630. The Rome and Venice editions of the Primo Libro date from the beginning and the end of his time at the court of Ferdinando II de' Medici, Grand Duke of Tuscany. The Fiori musicali of 1635 were published soon after the Venice edition of the canzonas.

== Rome editions ==
The Primo Libro was published in Rome in 1628 in two editions: in five partbooks by Giovan Battista Robletti, and in score by Paolo Masotti. It is not known which of the editions came first: they may have been prepared simultaneously. Unlike a number of earlier publications with both score and parts, the two were not prepared together.

The two 1628 editions appear to have been intended for quite different purposes: Ferdinando II de' Medici, Grand Duke of Tuscany, visited Rome in March of that year, and the Robletti partbooks are dedicated to him, apparently with the aim of securing his patronage. Frescobaldi took up a position as a musician to the Florentine court at the end of 1628 and stayed there until April 1634.

The Masotti edition was prepared by Frescobaldi's Luccan pupil Bartolomeo Grassi, and was printed in score so that it could also be played on keyboard instruments. Like the other editions of the Primo Libro, it is set in movable type. The print is accurate and of particularly high quality; unusually for the period, close attention has been paid to the vertical alignment of the notes. Grassi gave each of the thirty-seven canzonas a dedicatory name; as he explains in his postface to the score, these were the names of his friends and patrons, particularly the gentlemen of Lucca. The first piece in the book, Canzon Prima detta la Bonvisia, is named for Girolamo Bonvisi, the cleric who is also the dedicatee of the whole edition. Canzona 18 is dedicated to Masotti.

The content of the two editions is similar, but not identical; the Masotti score contains forty pieces, the Robletti partbooks thirty-five. The Robletti edition contains one piece, Canzon seconda, violino over cornetto, not included in the Masotti print, but omits three of the pieces in that edition, the Canzon Prima, detta la Bonvisia, the Canzona 34, detta la Sandoninia and the Canzona 37, detta la Sardina. Grassi also included two pieces for spinet and one for spinet and violin which are not found in the other editions.

== Venice edition ==
The edition published in Venice by Alessandro Vincenti in 1634 is substantially different from both the Rome prints. Although dated 1634, it may have been published in 1635 or early in 1636. It consists of thirty canzonas from the Rome editions, of which twenty-eight are in both, and two in the Masotti score only, with the addition of ten new works. Eight canzonas from the 1628 editions are omitted. Of the works from 1628, none was reprinted without some change; in about half of those thirty pieces the changes are relatively minor, while others were substantially rewritten. Of the total of forty-eight canzonas in the collection, sixteen are found in two versions with substantial differences between them.

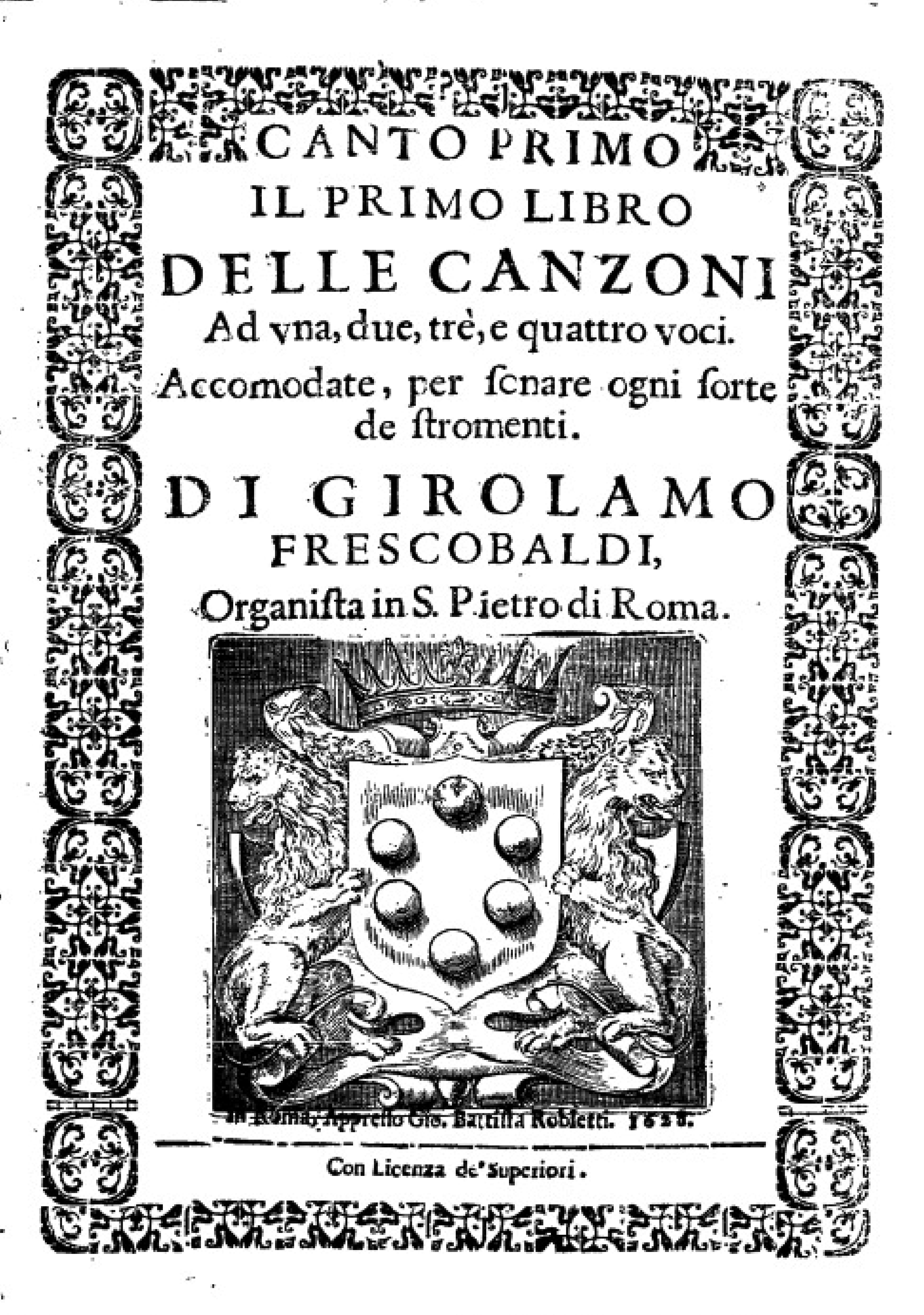
Title page of the Canto Primo part of the Robletti edition, Rome 1628

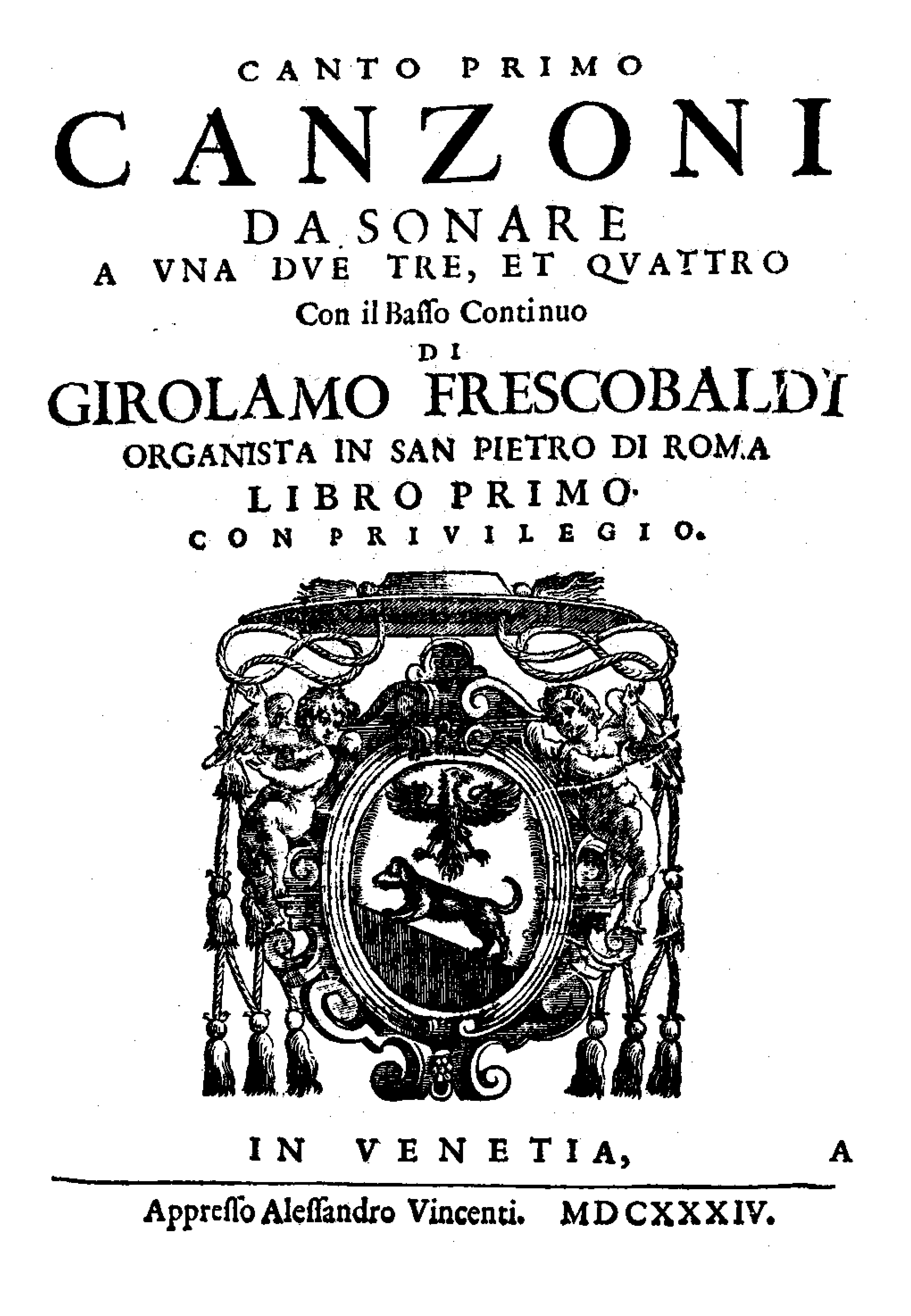
Title page of the Canto Primo part of the Alessandro Vincenti edition, Venice 1634

== Catalogue numbers ==
The fifty-one pieces in the collection are catalogued as follows:

| FTCO (Note: Frescobaldi Thematic Catalogue Online) | Masotti 1628 | Robletti 1628 | Vincenti 1634 | Notes |
|---|---|---|---|---|
| 8.01a | Canzona prima, detta la Bonvisia, canto solo | | | |
| 8.01c | | | Canzon prima, canto solo | |
| 8.02a | Canzona seconda, detta la Bernardinia, canto solo | | | |
| 8.02b | | Canzon prima, canto solo | | |
| 8.02c | | | Canzon terza, canto solo | |
| 8.03b | | Canzon seconda, canto solo | | only in Robletti |
| 8.04a | Canzona terza, detta la Lucchesina, canto solo | | | |
| 8.04b | | Canzon quarta, canto solo | | |
| 8.04c | | | Canzon seconda, canto solo | |
| 8.05a | Canzona quarta, detta la Donatina, canto solo | | | |
| 8.05b | | Canzon terza, canto solo | | |
| 8.05c | | | Canzon quarta, canto solo | |
| 8.06a | Canzona quinta, detta la Tromboncina, basso solo | | | |
| 8.06b | | Canzon prima, basso solo | | |
| 8.06c | | | Canzon prima, basso solo | |
| 8.07a | Canzona sesta, detta l'Altera, basso solo | | | |
| 8.07b | | Canzon terza, basso solo | | |
| 8.07c | | | Canzon seconda, basso solo | |
| 8.08a | Canzona settima, detta la Superba, basso solo | | | |
| 8.08b | | Canzon quarta, basso solo | | |
| 8.09a | Canzona ottava, detta l'Ambitiosa, basso solo | | | |
| 8.09b | | Canzon seconda, basso solo | | |
| 8.09c | | | Canzon terza, basso solo | |
| 8.10a | Canzona nona, detta la Gualterina, a due canti | | | |
| 8.10b | | Canzon prima, a due canti | | |
| 8.10c | | | Canzon prima, a due canti | |
| 8.11a | Canzona decima, detta la Henricuccia, a due canti | | | |
| 8.11b | | Canzon seconda, a due canti | | |
| 8.11c | | | Canzon seconda, a due canti | |
| 8.12a | Canzona undecima, detta la Plettenberger, a due canti | | | |
| 8.12b | | Canzon terza, a due canti | | |
| 8.12c | | | Canzon quarta, a due canti | |
| 8.13a | Canzona duodecima, detta la Todeschina, a due canti | | | |
| 8.13b | | Canzon quarta, a due canti | | |
| 8.14a | Canzona decimaterza, detta la Bianchina, a due canti | | | |
| 8.14b | | Canzon quinta, a due canti | | |
| 8.14c | | | Canzon terza, a due canti | |
| 8.15a | Canzona decimaquarta, detta la Marina, a due bassi | | | |
| 8.15b | | Canzon prima, a due bassi | | |
| 8.15c | | | Canzon prima, a due bassi | |
| 8.16a | Canzona decimaquinta, detta la Lievoratta, a due bassi | | | |
| 8.16b | | Canzon seconda, a due bassi | | |
| 8.16c | | | Canzon terza, a due bassi | |
| 8.17a | Canzona decimasesta, detta la Samminiata, a due bassi | | | |
| 8.17b | | Canzon terza, a due bassi | | |
| 8.17c | | | Canzon seconda, a due bassi | |
| 8.18a | Canzona decimasettima detta la Diodata, a due bassi | | | |
| 8.18b | | Canzon quarta, a due bassi | | |
| 8.18c | | | Canzon quarta, a due bassi | |
| 8.19a | Canzona decimaottava, detta la Masotti a due, canto e basso | | | |
| 8.19b | | Canzon prima a due, canto e basso | | |
| 8.19c | | | Canzon prima a 2, canto e basso | |
| 8.20a | Canzona decimanona, detta la Capriola a due, canto e basso | | | |
| 8.20b | | Canzon seconda a due, canto e basso | | |
| 8.20c | | | Canzon seconda a 2, canto e basso | |
| 8.21a | Canzona vigesima, detta la Liparella a due, canto e basso | | | |
| 8.21b | | Canzon terza a due, canto e basso | | |
| 8.21c | | | Canzon terza a 2, canto e basso | |
| 8.22a | Canzona vigesimaprima, detta la Tegrimuccia a due, canto e basso | | | |
| 8.22b | | Canzon quarta a due, canto e basso | | |
| 8.22c | | | Canzon quarta a 2, canto e basso | |
| 8.23a | Canzona vigesimaseconda, detta la Nicolina a due, canto e basso | | | |
| 8.23b | | Canzon quinta a due, canto e basso | | |
| 8.23c | | | Canzon quinta a 2, canto e basso | |
| 8.24a | Canzona vigesimaterza, detta la Franciotta a due, canto e basso | | | |
| 8.24b | | Canzon sesta a due, canto e basso | | |
| 8.24c | | | Canzon sesta a 2, canto e basso | |
| 8.25a | Canzona vigesimaquarta, detta la Nobile a 3, due bassi e canto | | | |
| 8.25b | | Canzon prima a 3, due bassi e canto | | |
| 8.25c | | | Canzon prima a 3, due bassi e canto | |
| 8.26a | Canzona vigesimaquinta, detta la Garzoncina a 3, due bassi e canto | | | |
| 8.26b | | Canzon seconda a 3, due bassi e canto | | |
| 8.26c | | | Canzon seconda a 3, due bassi e canto | |
| 8.27a | Canzona vigesimasesta, detta la Moricona a 3, due bassi e canto | | | |
| 8.27b | | Canzon terza a 3, due bassi e canto | | |
| 8.28c | | | Canzon terza a 3, due bassi e canto | only in Vincenti |
| 8.29c | | | Canzon quarta a 3, due bassi e canto | only in Vincenti |
| 8.30a | Canzona vigesimasettima, detta la Lanciona a 3, due canti e basso | | | |
| 8.30b | | Canzon quarta a 3, due canti e basso | | |
| 8.30c | | | Canzon quarta a 3, due canti e basso | |
| 8.31a | Canzona vigesimaottava, detta la Lanberta a 3, due canti e basso | | | |
| 8.31b | | Canzon quinta a 3, due canti e basso | | |
| 8.31c | | | Canzon terza a 3, due canti e basso | |
| 8.32a | Canzona vigesimanona, detta la Boccellina a 3, due canti e basso | | | |
| 8.32b | | Canzon sesta a 3, due canti e basso | | |
| 8.32c | | | Canzon seconda a 3, due canti e basso | |
| 8.33c | | | Canzon prima a 3, due canti e basso | only in Vincenti |
| 8.34c | | | Canzon quinta a 3, due canti e basso | only in Vincenti |
| 8.35a | Canzona trigesima, detta la Cittadellia a 4, due canti e due bassi | | | |
| 8.35b | | Canzon prima a 4, due canti e due bassi | | |
| 8.35c | | | Canzon quarta a 4, due canti e due bassi | |
| 8.36a | Canzona trigesimaprima, detta l'Arnolfinia, a 4, due canti e due bassi | | | |
| 8.36b | | Canzon seconda a 4, due canti e due bassi | | |
| 8.37a | Canzona trigesimaseconda, detta l'Altogradina, a 4. due canti e due bassi | | | |
| 8.37b | | Canzon quarta a 4, due canti e due bassi | | |
| 8.38a | Canzona trigesimaterza, detta la Rovellina, a 4, due canti e due bassi | | | |
| 8.38b | | Canzon quinta a 4, due canti e due bassi | | |
| 8.38c | | | Canzon seconda a 4, due canti e due bassi | |
| 8.39a | Canzona trigesimaquarta, detta la Sandoninia, a 4, due canti e due bassi | | | |
| 8.39c | | | Canzon prima a 4, due canti e due bassi | |
| 8.40c | | | Canzon terza a 4, due canti e due bassi | only in Vincenti |
| 8.41a | Canzona trigesimaquinta, detta l'Alessandrina, a 4, canto, alto, tenore e basso | | | |
| 8.41b | | Canzon terza a 4, canto, alto, tenore e basso | | |
| 8.42a | Canzona trigesimasesta, detta la Capponcina, a 4. canto, alto, tenore e basso | | | |
| 8.42b | | Canzon sesta a 4, canto, alto, tenore e basso | | |
| 8.42c | | | Canzon terza a 4, canto, alto, tenor e basso | |
| 8.43a | Canzona trigesimasettima, detta la Sardina, a 4, canto alto, tenore e basso | | | only in Masotti |
| 8.44c | | | Canzon prima a 4, canto, alto, tenor e basso, sopra Rugier | only in Vincenti |
| 8.45c | | | Canzon seconda a 4, canto, alto, tenor e basso, sopra Romanesca | only in Vincenti |
| 8.46c | | | Canzon quarta a 4, canto, alto, tenor e basso | only in Vincenti |
| 8.47c | | | Canzon quinta a 4, canto, alto, tenor e basso | only in Vincenti |
| 8.48c | | | Canzon sesta a 4, canto, alto, tenor e basso | only in Vincenti |
| 8.49 | Toccata per Spinettina e Violino | | | only in Masotti |
| 8.50 | Toccata per spinettina sola, over liuto | | | only in Masotti |
| 8.51 | Canzona ultima detta la Vittoria, spinettina sola | | | only in Masotti |
