= Marco Dall'Aquila =

Italian lutenist and composer (c1480–after 1538)

Marco Dall'Aquila (c.1480 – after 1538) was a Venetian lutenist and composer known for musical forms called polyphonic ricercars. He was born in L'Aquila but lived and worked in Venice. He often performed at concerts in the houses of nobles in the city, and in 1505 he published Tabullatura et rasone de metter ogni canto in liuto.

On 11 March 1505, Dall'Aquila also received a grant for a petition where he claimed to have developed a method of printing tablature which he could use to score any lute composition into tablature. In the petition for the grant, he also asked for a ban on other printing methods and imports of music scored by other methods, and for a portion of penalties paid for infringement. However, no printed editions demonstrating his method survive.

== Works ==
Dall'Aquila's music is widely available as recordings by contemporary lutenists. Selected works include:

- Ricercar No.16, for lute
- Ricercar No.33, for lute
- Ricercar
- Il est Bel et Bon
- Ricervar Lautre Jour, No 101
- Nous Bergiers
- La Traditora, No 3
- La Traditora, No 2
- La Battaglia (after Janequin)
- La cara cosa, for lute (No 36f)
- Ricercar/Fantasia for lute
- Ricercar for lute (No 24)
- Ricercar for lute (No 16)
- La traditora, for lute (No 38)
- Priambolo for lute (No 71)
- Amy souffrez, for lute (No 62)
- Ricercar for lute (No 19)
- Ricercar for lute (No 101)
- Ricercar/Fantasia for lute (No.26)
- Ricercar for lute (No 28)
- Ricercar for lute (No 70)
- Ricercar for lute (No 22)
- Ricercar for lute (No 18)
- Ricercar for lute (No 15)
- Ricercar/Fantasia for lute
- Ricercar for lute (No.26)
- Ricercar for lute (No.17)
- Ricercar for lute (No.13)
- Ricercar for lute (No.20)
- Fantasia for lute (No.27)
- Ricercar for lute (No.6)
- Fantasia for lute (No.9)
- Pioverin, for lute
- Il Marchese di Saluzzo, for lute
- Fantasia for lute (No.28)
- Ricercar for lute (No.4)
- Ricercar for lute (No.2)
- Ricercar for lute (No.5)
- Pomo, for lute
- Pavana for lute
- Piva for lute
- Tocha tocha la canella, for lute
- Fantasia for lute (No.7)
- Carnalesca, for lute
- Donne impresteme il vostro burato da buratare la mia farina, for lute
