= Francesco da Castello =

Flemish-Italian painter (1540–1621)

Francesco da Castello (Flemish: Frans van de Casteele; 1540 in Brussels – 23 October 1621 in Rome) was a Flemish-Italian painter and manuscript illuminator, chiefly active in Rome.

== Biography ==
The details of Castello's life here were documented by the contemporary artist-biographer Giovanni Baglione. Francesco painted an Assumption of the Virgin and Saints for the first chapel of San Giacomo degli Spagnoli. He painted a Madonna and child with St Nicholas the Bishop and St Julian for the chapel of San Giuliano in the church of San Rocco of Ripetta. He painted for the palace of Ciriaco Mattei. He painted a Martiri Turritani for the Basilica of San Gavino in Porto Torres, Sardinia. He also was a manuscript illuminator. He died at the age of 81 years.

He had two sons: one, Pietro, studied medicine and practiced in Palermo, Sicily; the other, Michele Castello (1588 – 28 October 1636), was mainly an illuminator, but completed a few altarpieces. Maddalena Corvina was Castello's niece, and apprenticed under him for painting.
