= Maddalena Corvina =

Italian painter and engraver (1607–1664)

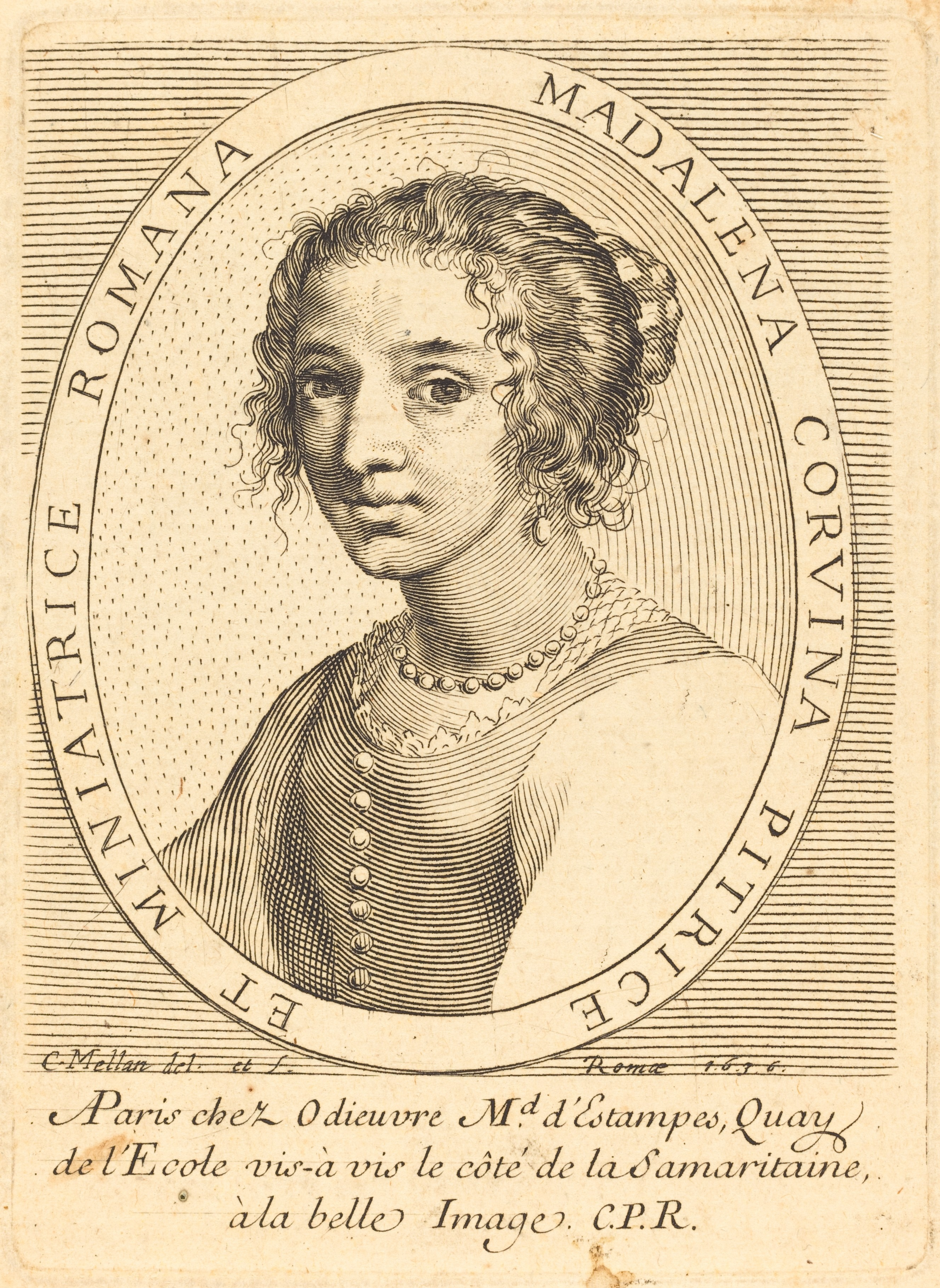
- A portrait of Maddalena Corvina by Claude Mellan, 1636
- Born: 17 October 1607; Rome, Papal States
- Died: 3 February 1664 (aged 56); Rome, Papal States
- Known for: Painting; engraving
- Style: Miniature painting; portraiture; still life
- Relatives: Francesco da Castello (uncle)
- Patrons: House of Medici

Maddalena Corvina (17 October 1607 – 3 February 1664) was an Italian portrait and still life painter and engraver, specializing in miniature portrait paintings. She lived and worked in Rome, where the House of Medici were her patrons. She apprenticed under her uncle, Francesco da Castello. Anna Angelica Allegrini was a student of hers.

Works by Corvina are held in the Albani Library. She was the subject of a portrait by Claude Mellan in 1636.

== Gallery ==
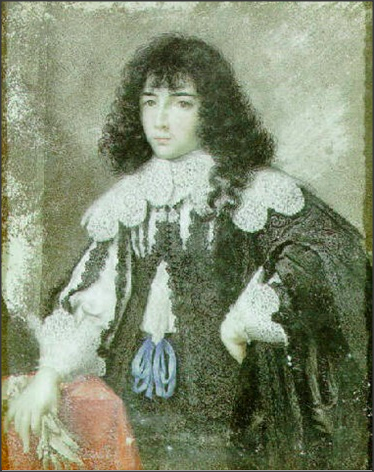
Portrait of a young gentleman holding gloves and leaning on a table, 1639

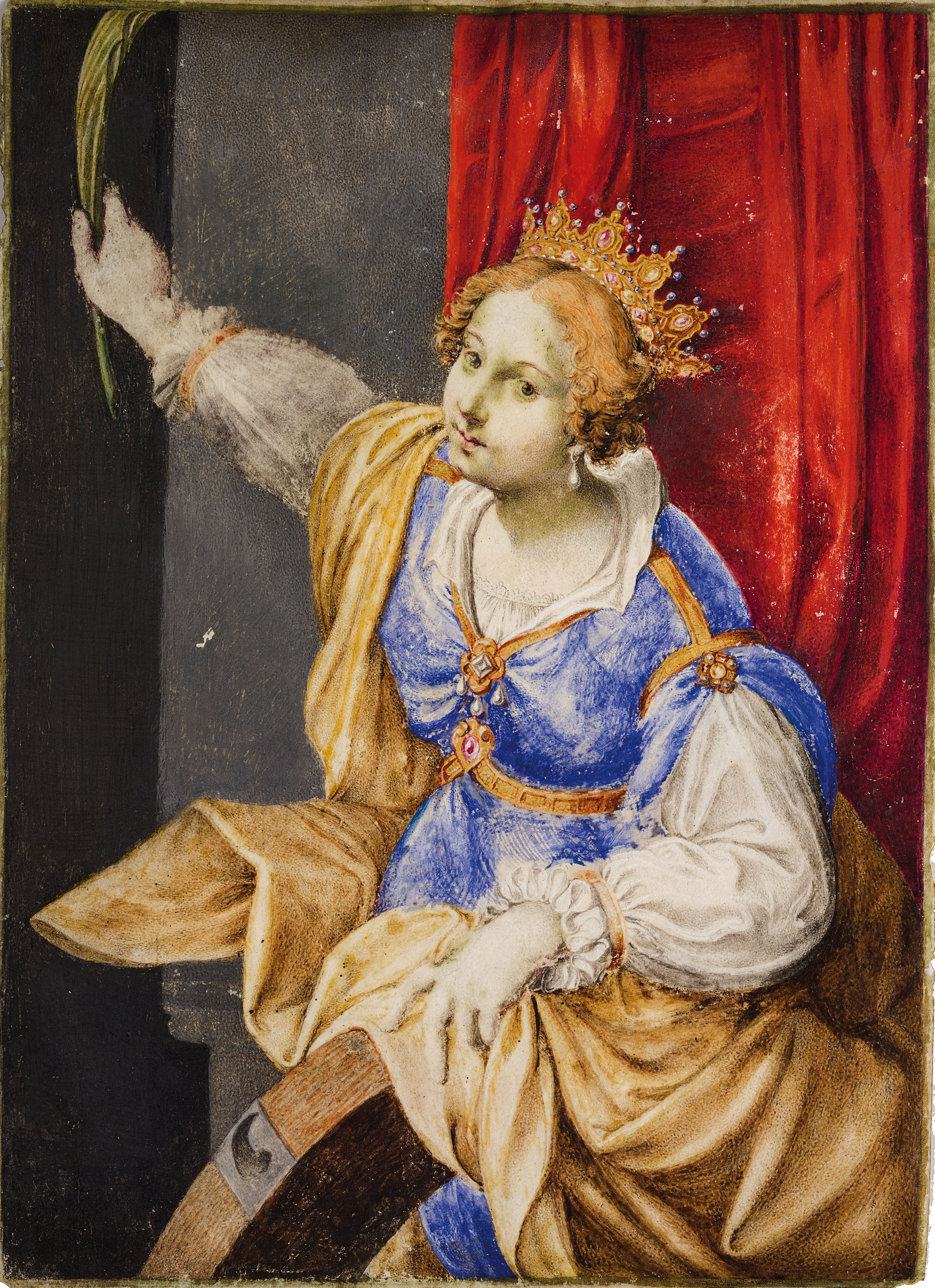
Presumed portrait of Artemisia Gentileschi as Saint Catherine (attribution)

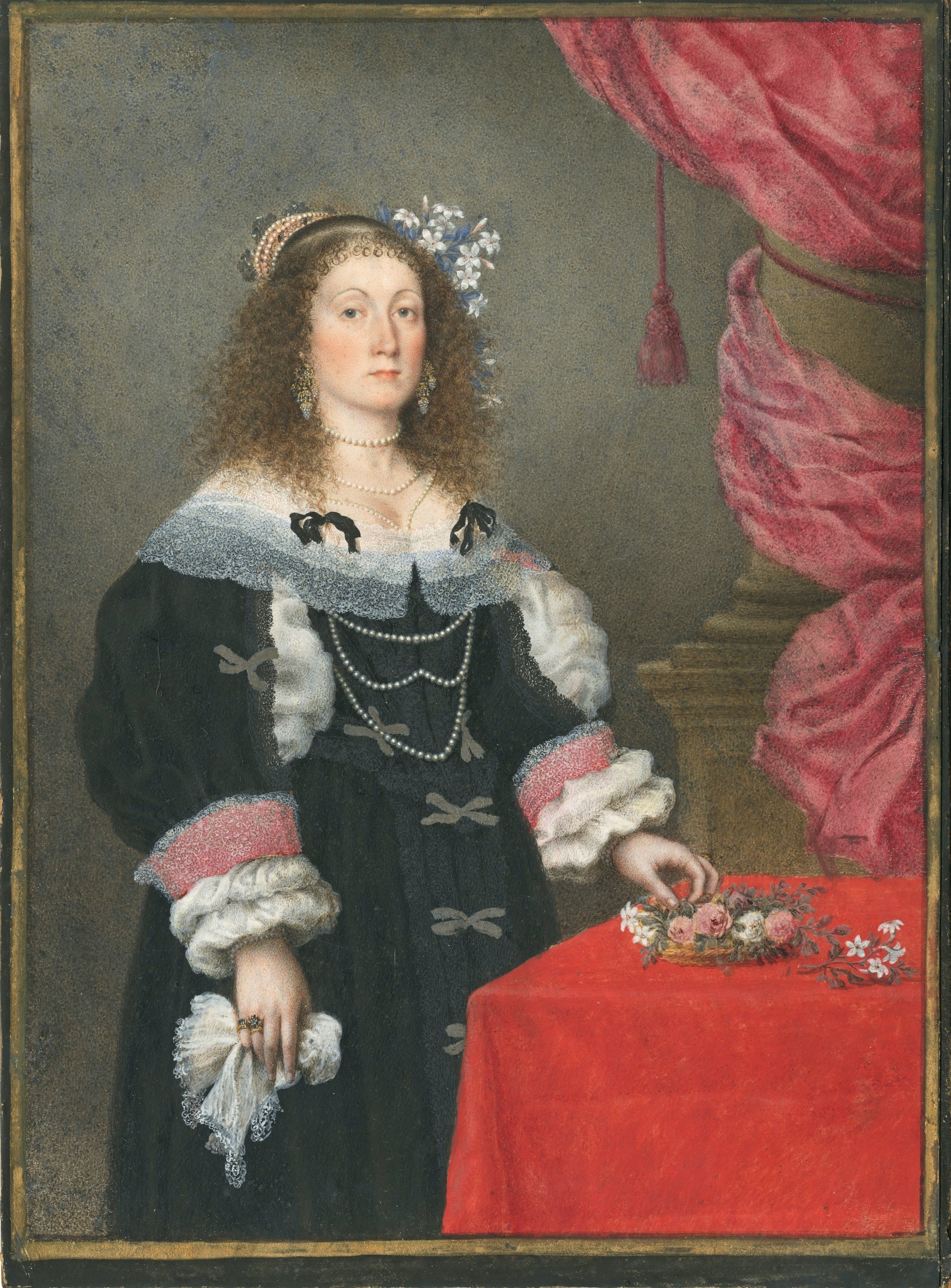
Portrait of a Lady of High Standing, circa 1635–1645 (attribution)
