= Seven Ricercari (Gabrielli) =

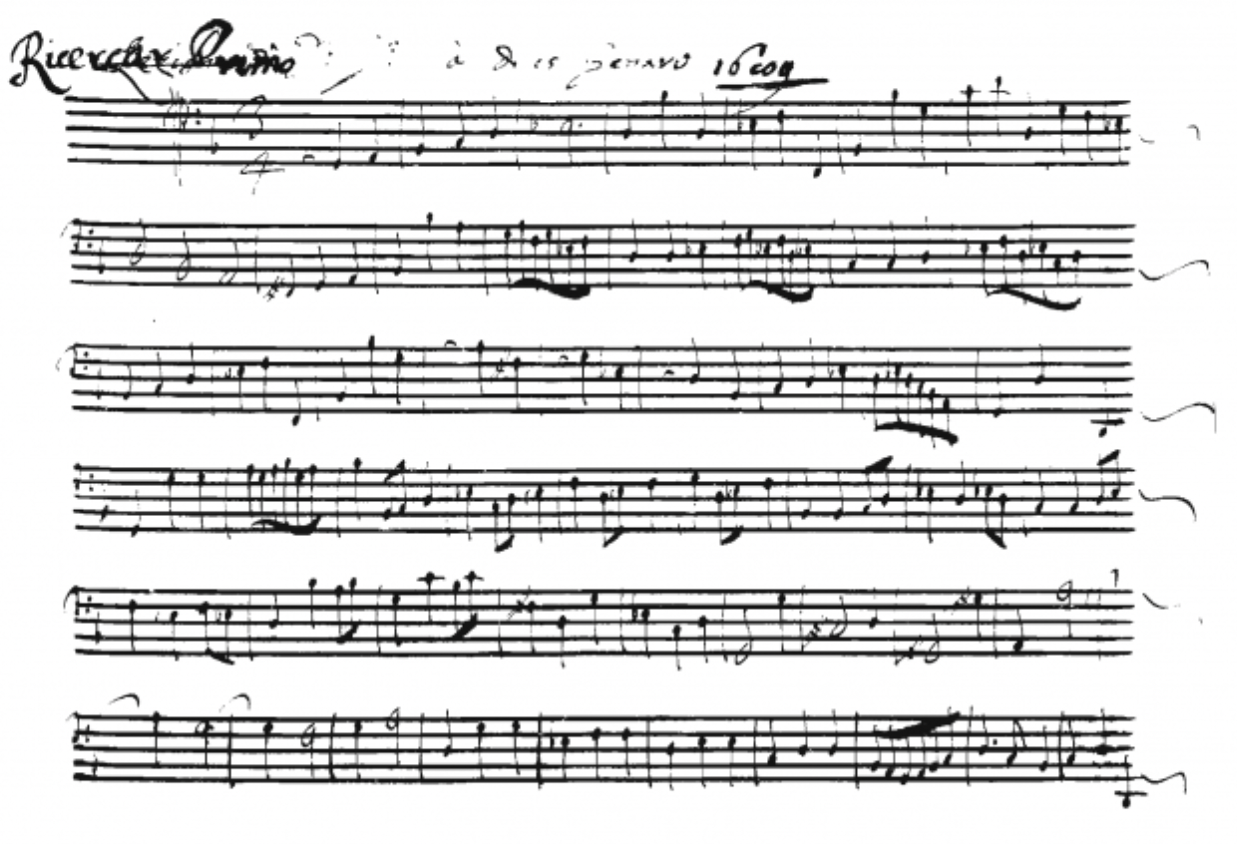
First page of Gabrielli's original manuscript of the first ricercar

Domenico Gabrielli wrote seven ricercari for solo cello in 1689, some of the earliest pieces of music composed for cello in history. Some of the ricercars of the set are included in the RCM cello repertoire, and the set has been completely or partially recorded by cellists such as Josetxu Obregón, Anner Bylsma and Lisa Beznosiuk's husband Richard Tunnicliffe.

== Recordings ==
- Celloevolution: From Bologna to Cöthen - Josetxu Obregón, 2022
- Anner Bylsma plays Cello Suites and Sonatas - Anner Bylsma, 1974
- Ricercars for solo cello - recordings (i) Roel Dieltens (ii) Hidemi Suzuki 2005 (iii) Richard Tunnicliffe 2007 (iv) Bruno Cocset, 2012
- Birth of the Cello - Julius Berger, 2007 (Solo Musica)
