= Giovanni de Macque =

Netherlandish-Italian composer (1548/50–1614)

Giovanni de Macque (Giovanni de Maque, Jean de Macque) (1548/1550 – September 1614) was a Netherlandish composer of the late Renaissance and early Baroque, who spent almost his entire life in Italy. He was one of the most famous Neapolitan composers of the late 16th century; some of his experimentation with chromaticism was likely influenced by Carlo Gesualdo, who was an associate of his.

== Life ==
Macque was born in Valenciennes, but moved to Vienna at an early age, where he sang as a choirboy, and where he studied with Philippe de Monte, the renowned composer of madrigals. When his voice broke in late 1563 — the only evidence for his birthdate — he was moved out of the choir and into a Jesuit college, and sometime before 1574 he moved to Rome, where he worked as a composer and as an organist; he published his first book of madrigals in 1576 (in Venice, which had a much more active publishing industry). While in Rome he met Marenzio, and his early book of serious madrigals shows Marenzio's influence.

Macque moved to Naples around 1585, where he became famous as the leader of the Neapolitan school. His first employment there was with the Gesualdo household, a place he remained until May 1590 (shortly before the Gesualdo murders: see Carlo Gesualdo). Some of his work at this time is dedicated to Carlo, as well as the other members of the aristocratic household: Cesare d'Avalos, father of Carlo's murdered wife, as well as Fabrizio, Carlo's father. Later in 1590, however, he became organist at Santa Casa dell'Annunziata in Naples, and in 1594 organist to the Spanish viceroy (Naples was a Spanish possession at the time); in 1599 he became maestro di cappella at the Chapel Royal of Naples. While maestro di cappella he taught many of the later Neapolitan composers, including Luigi Rossi.

== Music and influence ==
Macque was a prolific madrigalist, who published 12 separate books of madrigals, although the numbering is confusing: for example the Primo libro de madrigali, for six voices, dates from 1576 in Venice, while another Primo libro de madrigali, for four voices, dates from 1587. After 1585, when he moved to Naples, his music shifted from the conservative Roman style to the more progressive Neapolitan one; perhaps he began renumbering his publications based on his stylistic change. His early and late madrigals include both light and serious music and often require virtuoso singing skill; likely some of these pieces were intended for performance by the concerto di donne, the three virtuoso female singers at the ducal Este court at Ferrara, which had a strong musical connection with Naples throughout the 1590s.

After 1599, his music shifted in style again; Macque began experimenting with chromaticism of the kind found in Gesualdo's madrigals. Most likely the nobleman influenced Macque, but it is possible that some of the influence went the other way, since the dating of Gesualdo's individual compositions is difficult, due to his publication of his work in large blocks, many years apart. Some of the madrigals Macque wrote after 1599 include "forbidden" melodic intervals (such as sevenths), chords entirely outside of the Renaissance modal universe (such as F# major) and melodic passages in consecutive chromatic semitones.

In addition to his madrigals, he was a prolific composer of instrumental music, writing canzonas, ricercars, capriccios and numerous pieces for organ. Some of his music is extraordinarily progressive harmonically, and can be compared with the vocal music of Gesualdo: the Consonanze stravaganti (exact date unknown, probably early 17th century) is a particularly good example. See Grout (1) for an extended example from this composition. (Complete score is available on IMSLP.)

Macque also wrote sacred music, including a book of motets for five to eight voices, litanies, laudi spirituali, and contrafactum motets (motets originally in another language, fitted with new texts known as contrafacta).

== References and further reading ==
- W. Richard Shindle, "Giovanni de Macque", in The New Grove Dictionary of Music and Musicians, ed. Stanley Sadie. 20 vol. London, Macmillan Publishers Ltd., 1980. ISBN 1-56159-174-2
- Shindle, W. Richard. L. Macy (ed.). Giovanni de Macque. Grove Music Online. (subscription required) Note: this article contains some new information not included in the 1980 New Grove article by the same author.
- Gustave Reese, Music in the Renaissance. New York, W.W. Norton & Co., 1954. ISBN 0-393-09530-4
- (1) Donald Jay Grout, A History of Western Music. New York, W.W. Norton & Co., 1980. ISBN 0-393-95136-7
- Catherine Deutsch, Ariosità et artificiosità dans les madrigaux de Giovanni de Macque (1581-1597), Ph.D. Univ. Paris-Sorbonne, 2007.
