= Fiori musicali =

1635 liturgical organ music collection by Girolamo Frescobaldi

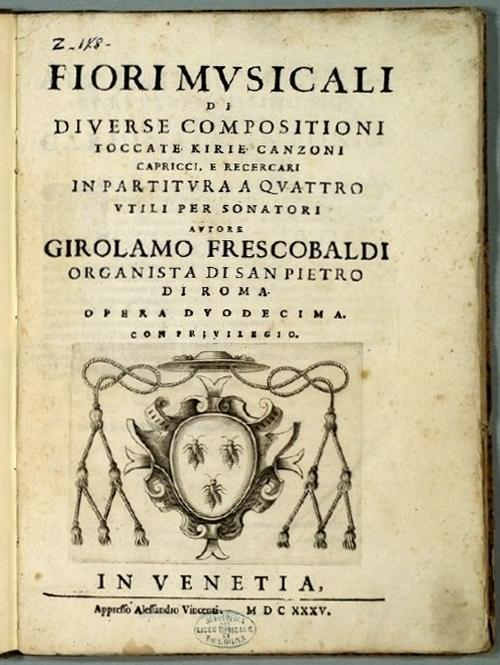
Title page of the first edition of Fiori musicali

Fiori musicali (lit. 'Musical Flowers') is a collection of liturgical organ music by Girolamo Frescobaldi, first published in 1635. It contains three organ masses and two secular capriccios. Generally acknowledged as one of Frescobaldi's greatest works, Fiori musicali influenced composers during at least two centuries. Johann Sebastian Bach was among its admirers, and parts of it were included in the celebrated Gradus ad parnassum, a highly influential 1725 treatise by Johann Joseph Fux which was in use even in the 19th century.

== History ==
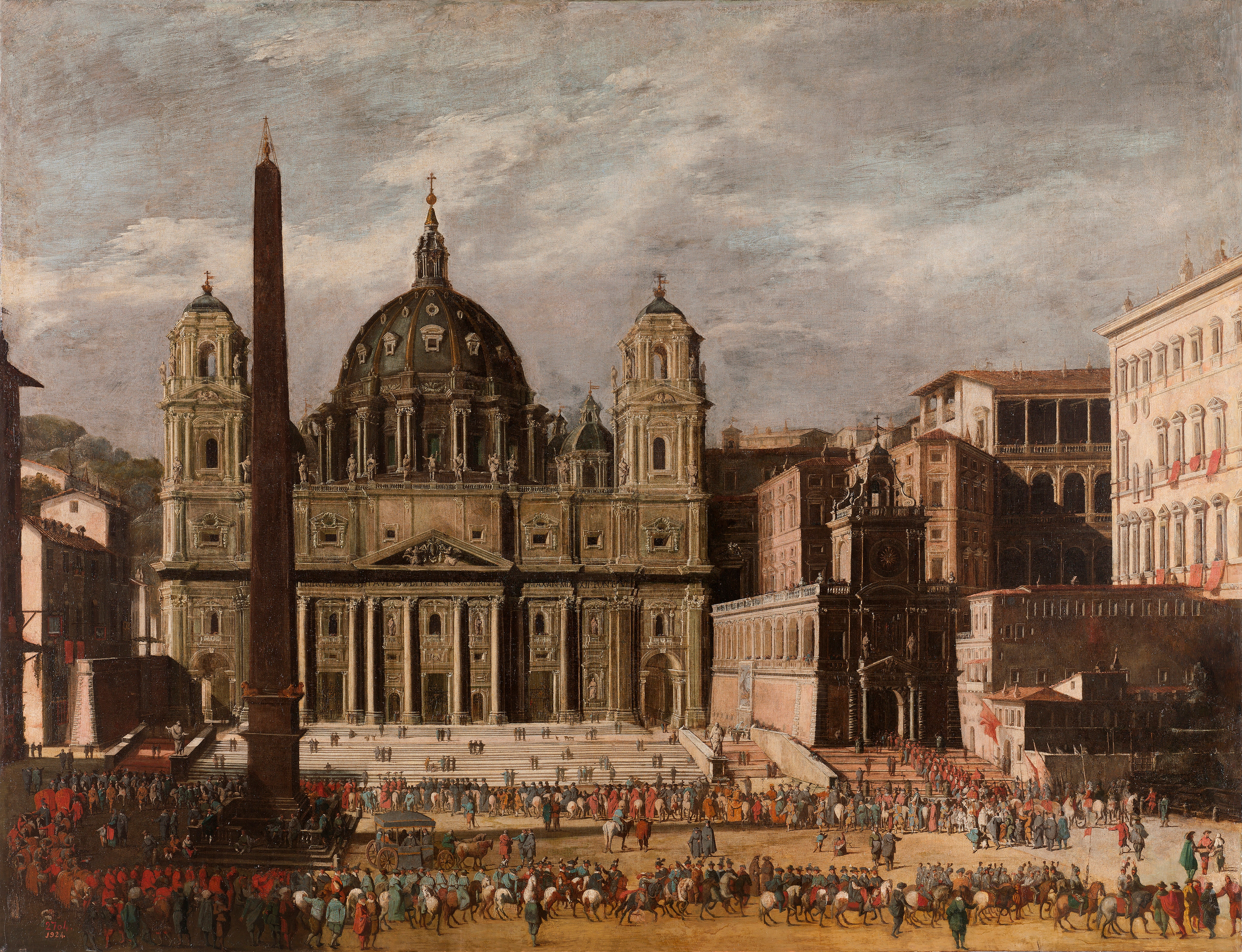
A 1630 painting of St. Peter's Basilica in Rome, where Frescobaldi worked at the time of the publication of Fiori musicali

Fiori musicali was first published in Venice in 1635, when Frescobaldi was working as organist of St. Peter's Basilica in Rome, under the patronage of Pope Urban VIII and his nephew Cardinal Francesco Barberini. It may have been conceived as music for St Mark's Basilica or a similarly important church. The collection was printed by Giacomo Vincenti (a celebrated publisher who had previously published reprints of Frescobaldi's capriccios), and dedicated to Cardinal Antonio Barberini, Francesco's younger brother. The full title of Frescobaldi's work is Fiori musicali di diverse compositioni, toccate, kyrie, canzoni, capricci, e recercari, in partitura. The fiori musicali appellation was not uncommon in the early 17th century, used by composers such as Felice Anerio, Antonio Brunelli, Ercole Porta, Orazio Tarditi, and others.

Before Fiori musicali, Frescobaldi seldom published liturgical music. It appeared only once, in Secondo libro di toccate of 1627; all other keyboard collections by the master concentrated instead on various secular genres (canzonas, capriccios, toccatas, and variations). The organ mass was still in its infancy, and composers seldom published such music. Although 16th-century composers did work on liturgical music, the forms they used were a far cry from 17th-century works. Early 17th-century examples from Italy include Adriano Banchieri's 1622 edition of L'organo suonarino (1 mass) and Bernardino Bottazzi's Choro et organo of 1614 (3 masses and miscellaneous versets). in France, Jean Titelouze published collections of liturgical music in 1624 and 1626 (but the characteristic French Organ Mass did not appear until much later). After Frescobaldi, however, several collections appeared: Giovanni Salvatore's Ricercari [...] e versi per rispondere nelle messe (1641), Antonio Croci's Frutti musicali (1642), and Giovanni Battista Fasolo's Annuale (1645)—all these contain three masses each, similar to Frescobaldi's.

== Structure ==
The collection consists of three masses: Missa della Domenica (Sunday Mass), Missa degli Apostoli ("Mass of the Apostles", for double feasts), Missa della Madonna ("Mass of the Virgin", for feasts of the Virgin). Each mass includes a number of pieces to be played at key moments before and during the service, and several settings of the first section of the Mass ordinary, Kyrie. Frescobaldi offers canzonas (Canzon dopo l'epistola) for the Gradual section of the mass, and ricercars (Recercar dopo il Credo) for the Offertory. The overall structure of Fiori musicali is as follows:

| Mass section | Missa della Domenica | Missa degli Apostoli | Missa della Madonna |
|---|---|---|---|
| avanti la Messa (before the Mass) | Toccata | Toccata | Toccata |
| Kyrie, Christe | 12 versets | 8 versets | 6 versets |
| dopo l'epistola (Gradual) | Canzona | Canzona | Canzona |
| dopo il Credo (Offertory) | Ricercar | Toccata and Ricercar (Recercar Chromaticho post il Credo), Ricercar (Altro recercar) | Ricercar, Toccata and Ricercar (Recercar con obligo di cantare) |
| per l'Elevazione (Elevation) | Toccata (Toccata cromaticha per le Levatione) | Toccata, Ricercar (Recercar con obligo del Basso come apare) | Toccata |
| post il Communio (after the Communion) | Canzona | Canzona (Canzon quarti toni) | |

The masses are followed by two capriccios on secular tunes - the Bergamasca and the Girolmeta (Capriccio sopra la Girolmeta). Neither theme is known to have any connection to the liturgy, and so the role of these pieces in Fiori musicali is unclear.

Frescobaldi's Kyrie and Christe versets are settings of Gregorian melodies: the three masses use melodies of Mass XI (Kyrie Orbis factor), Mass IV (Cunctipotens genitor), and Mass IX (Cum iubilo), respectively. The chant flows in long note values either in the same voice throughout, accompanied by various counterpoints, or is distributed among voices. The toccatas of Fiori musicali are markedly different from Frescobaldi's usual toccata style of numerous contrasting sections: avanti la Messa and avanti il Recercar works are introductory miniatures, and the Elevation toccatas are long pieces noted in Grove Music Online for their "sustained moods of passionate mysticism."

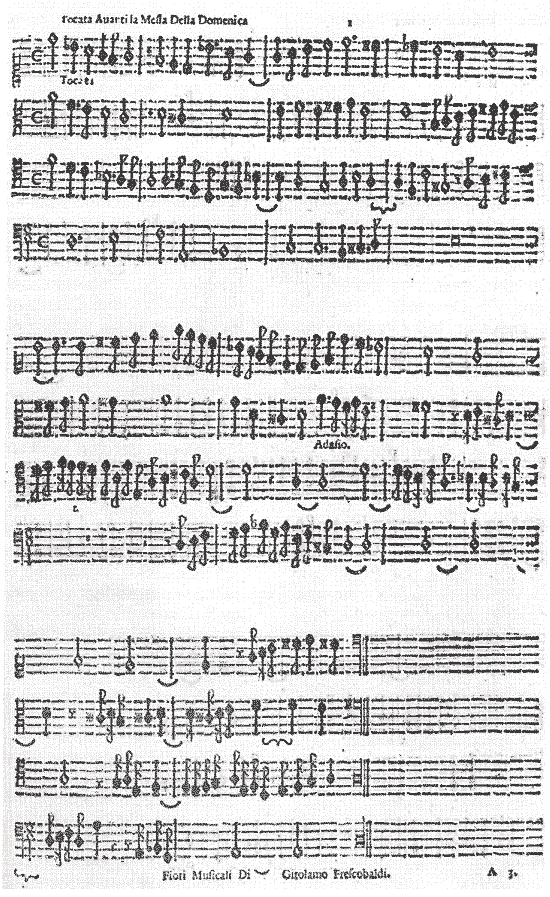
Facsimile of the first piece of Fiori musicali: Toccata avanti la Messa della Domenica

The ricercars include some of the most complex pieces in the collection. The Altro recercar of the second mass has three subjects, presented in separate sections and combined in the final part of the piece. The last ricercar of the collection, Recercar con obligo di cantare of the third mass, is similar, only built on two subjects. The piece is famous for Frescobaldi's instruction to the performer: the composer provides a brief melody to be sung as the fifth voice at certain key points during the ricercar, and these points must be found by the performer. Frescbobaldi remarks in the score: "Intendami chi puo che m'intend' io", "He who can understand me, will understand me; I understand myself." Three other ricercares—the one in the first mass, Recercar Cromaticho of the second mass and the first ricercar of the third mass—are variation ricercars, i.e. a single theme is accompanied with different counterpoints in several sections. Finally, Recercar con obligo del Basso come apare is built on a single subject, but is particularly important for its extended tonal range, quite rare for the period. The subject always appears transposed: first travelling from C to E, following the circle of fifths, then back to C (omitting A), then descending, again by the circle of fifths, to E♭, and finally, returning to C (omitting B♭).

The canzonas of Fiori musicali are somewhat similar to earlier examples by Frescobaldi, although the free, toccata element is less pronounced here. They are all variation canzonas, i.e. sectional pieces in which a single theme is treated with different counterpoints; the last canzona actually starts with two voices. Frescobaldi's Bergamasca is one of the highlights of the collection: there are seven sections elaborating on four themes, all derived from the theme and the bass of the original folk tune. In the score, the composer remarks "Chi questa Bergamasca sonerà non pocho imparerà", "Whoever plays this Bergamasca shall not learn a little". The Capriccio sopra la Girolmeta is also sectional; Frescobaldi here derives two subjects from the folk tune.

== Influence ==
Fiori Musicali: Toccata avanti la Messa della Domenica
Performed on the Taylor and Boody organ at Marquand Chapel, Yale University

Fiori Musicali: Kyrie della Domenica
Performed on the Taylor and Boody organ at Marquand Chapel, Yale University

Fiori musicali is one of the most influential collections of music in European history. Its contents inspired collections of sacred organ music by Italian composers (Salvatore, Croci and Fasolo), and both the contents and the layout were an influence on Sebastian Anton Scherer's Op.2, Operum musicorum secundum, published in 1664. Also in 1664, Bernardo Storace used a theme from Frescobaldi's Ricercare con l'obbligo di cantare la quinta parte senza tocarla for his triple fugue. Frescobaldi's move from secular to sacred composition was echoed in Johann Caspar Kerll's similar move in his Modulatio organica (1683). Most importantly, Frescobaldi's collection was studied by Henry Purcell and Johann Sebastian Bach (the latter copied the entire work for his own use).

Bach's followers and admirers such as Carl Philipp Emanuel Bach, Johann Kirnberger, and Johann Nikolaus Forkel all knew the collection and regarded it highly. Jan Dismas Zelenka arranged parts of Fiori musicali for orchestra. Anton Reicha included a fugue on a theme from Fiori musicali in his experimental 36 Fugues of 1803.

Perhaps most importantly, pieces from Fiori musicali were used as models of the strict style in the highly influential 18th-century counterpoint treatise, Gradus ad Parnassum by Johann Joseph Fux. Although Fux evidently held Palestrina in the highest regard, his own sacred a cappella works are more influenced by Frescobaldi's instrumental pieces.
