= Domenico Gabrielli =

Italian composer (1651–1690)

Domenico Gabrielli (15 April 1651 or 19 October 1659 – 10 July 1690) was an Italian Baroque composer and one of the earliest known virtuoso cello players, as well as a pioneer of cello music writing. Born in Bologna, he worked in the orchestra of the church of San Petronio and was also a member and for some time president (principe) of the Accademia Filarmonica of Bologna. During the 1680s, he also worked as a musician at the court of Duke Francesco II d'Este of Modena.

Gabrielli wrote several operas as well as instrumental and vocal church works. He is especially notable as the composer of some of the earliest attested works for solo cello (two sonatas for cello and basso continuo, a group of seven ricercari for unaccompanied cello, and a canon for two cellos). Among his contemporaries, his own virtuoso performances on this instrument earned him the nickname Mingain (or Minghino) dal viulunzeel, a dialect form meaning "Dominic of the cello."

== Works, editions and recordings ==
- Rodoaldo, re d' Italia − opera in 3 acts. Venice 1685 - manuscript in Modena.

Recordings

- Domenico Gabrielli - S. Sigismondo re di Borgogna - Oratorio per 5 voci con strumenti - Ensemble Les Nations, Maria Luisa Baldassari, direzione. Tactus, 2008
- Ricercars for solo cello - recordings (i) Roel Dieltens (ii) Hidemi Suzuki 2005 (iii) Richard Tunnicliffe 2007 (iv) Bruno Cocset, 2012
- Domenico Gabrielli. Cantate. Emanuela Galli, soprano, with ensemble Sistite Sidera. Stradivarius STR 33878 (1 CD, June 2012).
