= Ricercar =

Instrumental composition from the Baroque era

A ricercar (/ˌriːtʃərˈkɑːr/ REE-chər-KAR, Italian: [ritʃerˈkar]) or ricercare (/ˌriːtʃərˈkɑːreɪ/ REE-chər-KAR-ay, Italian: [ritʃerˈkaːre]) is a type of late Renaissance and mostly early Baroque instrumental composition. The term ricercar derives from the Italian verb ricercare, which means "to search out; to seek"; many ricercars serve a preludial function to "search out" the key or mode of a following piece. A ricercar may explore the permutations of a given motif, and in that regard may follow the piece used as illustration. The term is also used to designate an étude or study that explores a technical device in playing an instrument, or singing.

In its most common current usage, it refers to an early kind of fugue, particularly one of a serious character in which the subject uses long note values. The term has a considerably more varied historical usage, however.

Among the best-known ricercars are the two for harpsichord contained in Bach's The Musical Offering and Domenico Gabrielli's set of seven for solo cello. The latter set contains what are considered to be some of the earliest pieces for solo cello ever written.

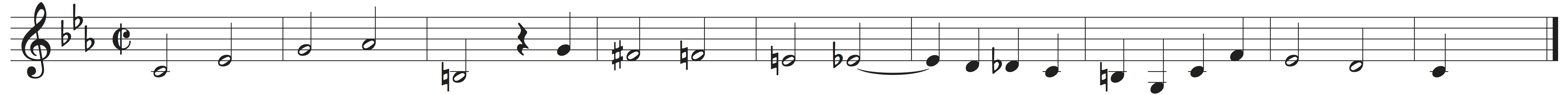
Subject of Bach's The Musical Offering, which includes a three-part and six-part ricercar

== Terminology ==
In the sixteenth century, the word ricercar could refer to several types of compositions. Terminology was flexible, even lax then: whether a composer called an instrumental piece a toccata, a canzona, a fantasia, or a ricercar was clearly not a matter of strict taxonomy but a rather arbitrary decision. Yet ricercars fall into two general types: a predominantly homophonic piece, with occasional runs and passagework, not unlike a toccata, found from the late fifteenth to the mid-sixteenth century, after which time this type of piece came to be called a toccata; and from the second half of the sixteenth century onward, a sectional work in which each section begins imitatively, usually in a variation form. The second type of ricercar, the imitative, contrapuntal type, was to prove the more important historically, and eventually developed into the fugue. Marco Dall'Aquila (c. 1480–after 1538) was known for polyphonic ricercars.

Examples of both types of ricercars can be found in the works of Girolamo Frescobaldi, e.g. in his Fiori musicali.

== See also ==
- Gödel, Escher, Bach: An Eternal Golden Braid by Douglas Hofstadter, which includes a section entitled "Six-part Ricercar", after the Ricercar a 6 from J.S.Bach's The Musical Offering.
- Ariadne musica, by Johann Caspar Ferdinand Fischer: a collection of 20 preludes and fugues, along with 5 ricercars denoting seasons of the Liturgical year.
- When is a novel a ricercare? by H. Doug Matsuoka, describes emulating the structure of a musical ricercare into a literary work.

== Bibliography ==
- "Ricercar," "Fugue," "Counterpoint" in The New Grove Dictionary of Music and Musicians, ed. Stanley Sadie. 20 vol. London, Macmillan Publishers Ltd., 1980. ISBN 1-56159-174-2.
- Gustave Reese, Music in the Renaissance. New York, W.W. Norton & Co., 1954. ISBN 0-393-09530-4.
- Manfred Bukofzer, Music in the Baroque Era. New York, W.W. Norton & Co., 1947. ISBN 0-393-09745-5.
- Ursula Kirkendale, "The Source for Bach's Musical Offering," Journal of the American Musicological Society 33 (1980), 99–141.
- The New Harvard Dictionary of Music, ed. Don Randel. Cambridge, Massachusetts, Harvard University Press, 1986. ISBN 0-674-61525-5.
- Arthur J. Ness, "Ricercar", Harvard Dictionary of Music, fourth edition, edited by Don Michael Randel, 729–31. Harvard University Press Reference Library. Cambridge: Belknap Press for Harvard University Press, 2003. ISBN 0-674-01163-5.
