= Ascanio Mayone =

Italian composer and harpist

Ascanio Mayone (ca. 1565 – 1627) was a Neapolitan composer and harpist. He trained as a pupil of Giovanni de Macque in Naples, and worked at Santissima Annunziata Maggiore as an organist from 1593 and maestro di cappella from 1621; he was also organist at the royal chapel from 1602. He published madrigals, but his main work is his two volumes of keyboard music, Capricci per sonar (1603, 1609). These contain canzonas, toccatas, variations, and arrangements of vocal pieces, many of which are distinctively Baroque rather than Renaissance in style.

== Works ==
- Il Primo libro di diversi capricci per sonare, Naples, 1603 (modern edition by Christopher Stembridge, Padua, 1981)
- Il primo libro di madrigali, 5 vv, Naples, 1604 (facs. partly damaged)
- Primo libro di ricercari a 3, Naples, 1606, (modern ed. F. Sumner: Italian instrumental music of the sixteenth and early seventeenth centuries; vol. 18, Garland Publishing, New York,1995)
- Secondo libro di diversi capricci per sonare, Naples, 1609 (modern edition by Christopher Stembridge, Padua, 1984)
- 2 madrigals in Teatro de madrigali a cinque voci. De diversi eccellentiss. musici napoletani…, Naples 1609 (facs. partly damaged)
- Messe e vespri, 8vv
- Laetatus sum, 9vv
- Magnificat, 8vv
