= Claude Mellan =

French engraver and painter

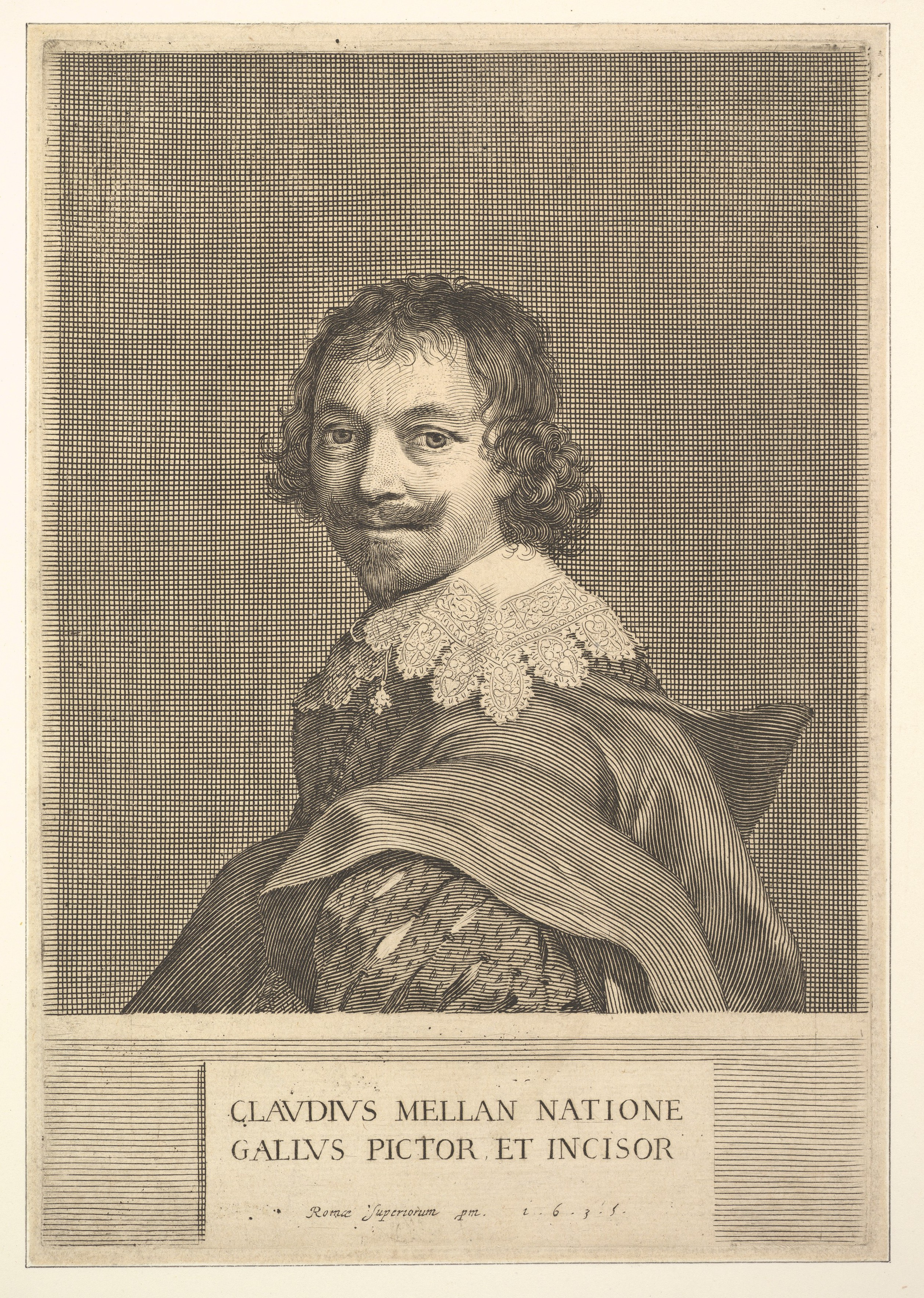
- Self-engraved portrait, c. 1635
- Born: 23 May 1598; Abbeville, France
- Died: 9 September 1688 (aged 90); Paris, France

Claude Mellan (23 May 1598 – 9 September 1688) (Note: 23 May 1598 is his date of baptism.) was a French draughtsman, engraver, and painter.

== Early life and training ==
Mellan was born in Abbeville, the son of a customs official.

His first known print (Préaud no. 288 (Note: Engraving catalog numbers are from Préaud 1988.)), made for a thesis in theology at the Collège des Mathurins, shows that he was in Paris by 1619. (Note: The Collège des Mathurins was a constituent college of the Sorbonne (see fr:Université de Paris).) His first teachers have not been identified, but his early engravings are thought to show the influence of Léonard Gaultier.

== Rome ==
In 1624 Mellan went to Rome, where he studied engraving for a brief time with Francesco Villamena, who died that year. He then studied under Simon Vouet, who had been in Rome since 1614. Vouet encouraged Mellan to draw, considering it essential for both engraving and painting. Mellan engraved some of Vouet's works and also began drawing small portraits from life. Many of his portrait drawings were never engraved. He developed a style that was simple and natural, that would be characteristic throughout his later career. Many of his engravings in Rome were reproductive works, including, for example, designs by Pietro da Cortona and Gianlorenzo Bernini. The few after his own designs include Saint Francis de Paul (Préaud no. 77) and the Penitent Magdalene (Préaud no. 113). The plates Mellan engraved in Rome were mostly executed in a conventional manner.

== Later years in Paris ==
In 1637, after a period of time in Aix-en-Provence with Nicolas-Claude Fabri de Peiresc, he returned to Paris, where he adopted an idiosyncratic technique, in which, instead of creating shade by cross-hatching, he used a system of parallel lines, regulating tone by varying their breadth and closeness. Joseph Strutt wrote:

The effect, which he produced by this method of engraving, is soft and clear. In single figures, and small subjects, he succeeded very happily; but in large subjects, where great depth of shadow was required, he has failed....

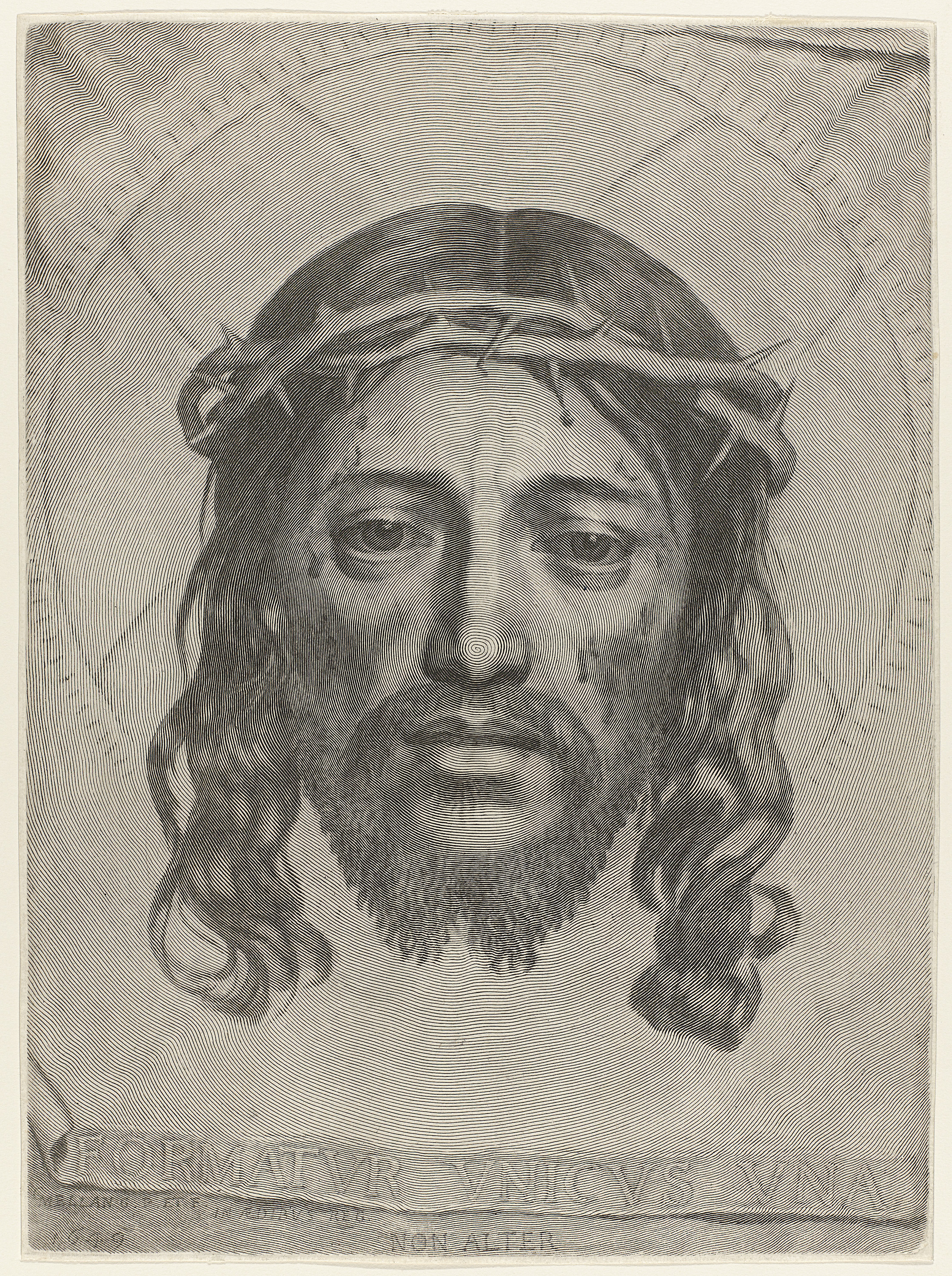
Sudarium of Saint Veronica, engraving by Claude Mellan, 1649

Particularly notable is his engraving The Face of Christ (1649; Préaud no. 21), also called the Sudarium of Saint Veronica (see Veil of Veronica), created from a single spiralling line that starts at the tip of Jesus' nose.

During this later period in Paris, Mellan mostly engraved his own work. He was much sought after as a portrait artist, drawing from life and engraving the portraits. Among his subjects were members of the royal family of Bourbon. His drawings "reveal more variety of style and execution than he showed in the engravings." Two examples, for which both a drawing (Nationalmuseum, Stockholm) and an engraving exist, are portraits of Marie-Louise de Gonzague-Nevers (Préaud no. 167) and Henri de Savoie, Duc de Nemours (Préaud no. 182).

He also created large religious works with geometric layouts and poses. According to Barbara Brejon de Lavergnée, writing in The Dictionary of Art, Mellan's use of the single line gives "an abstract effect" and, "as an engraver he proved sensitive to the classical ideal developed by Nicolas Poussin, Jacques Stella and others in Paris in the middle of the 17th century." Among Mellan's reproductive engravings are two frontispieces for religious works after designs by Poussin (1640; Préaud no. 294) and Stella (1641; Préaud no. 296).

Anatole de Montaiglon catalogued 400 engravings by Mellan, and about 100 drawings are known. The latter are mostly in the Stockholm Nationalmuseum (via the collection of Carl Gustav Tessin) and the Hermitage, Saint Petersburg (via the Cobenzl collection). Several of Mellan's lost paintings are known from his engravings of them, including Samson and Delilah (Préaud no. 5) and Saint John the Baptist in the Desert (Préaud no. 84). A few other paintings were attributed to him, beginning in the 1970s, but these have not been generally accepted.

He died in Paris.

== See also ==
- Maddalena Corvina, fellow painter and subject of Mellan

== Bibliography ==
- Brejon de Lavergnée, Barbara (1996). "Mellan, Claude". In Turner, Jane (ed.). The Dictionary of Art: In Thirty-four Volumes. Vol. 21 (Reprinted with minor corrections ed.). New York: Grove. pp. 85–86. ISBN 9781884446009. Also at Oxford Art Online (subscription required).
- Chilvers, Ian (2009). The Oxford Dictionary of Art and Artists (4th ed.). Oxford: Oxford University Press. ISBN 9780199532940.
- Montaiglon, Anatole de; Mariette, Pierre Jean (1856). Catalogue raisonné de l'oeuvre de Claude Mellan d'Abbeville (in French). Abbeville: P. Briez.
- Préaud, Maxime (1988). Inventaire du fonds français: Graveurs du dix-septième siècle. Tome 17, Claude Melan. Paris: Bibliothèque Nationale. ISBN 9782717717778.
- Strutt, Joseph (1786). "Claude Mellan". A Biographical Dictionary Containing an Historical Account of All the Engravers, from the Earliest Period of the Art of Engraving to the Present Time. Vol. 2. New Bond Street, London: J. Davis, For Robert Faulder. pp. 142–144. Vols. 1 and 2 at Google Books.
