= Canzona =

Italian musical form

The canzona, also known as the canzon or canzone, (Note: During Giovanni Gabrieli's lifetime, the form was frequently spelled canzona, though both earlier and later the singular was spelled either canzon or canzone with the plural canzoni. The use of canzone as the plural is sometimes found in Italian, but is not common. English (and often German) uses the term canzonas as the plural.) is an Italian musical form derived from the Franco-Flemish and Parisian chansons.

== Background ==
The canzona is an instrumental musical form that differs from the similar forms of ricercare and fantasia in its livelier, markedly rhythmic material and separation into distinct sections. At first based on the Franco-Flemish polyphonic songs (chansons) that gave it its name, the instrumental canzona was soon independently composed, not least by Gabrieli in his brass canzonas and by Girolamo Frescobaldi in his keyboard canzonas. As a form, the canzona would influence the fugue, and the ensemble canzonas were the direct ancestors of the 17th-century sonata da chiesa.

== Bibliography ==
- Grout, Donald Jay (1960). A History of Western Music. New York City: W. W. Norton & Co.
