= Ruggiero Giovannelli =

Italian composer

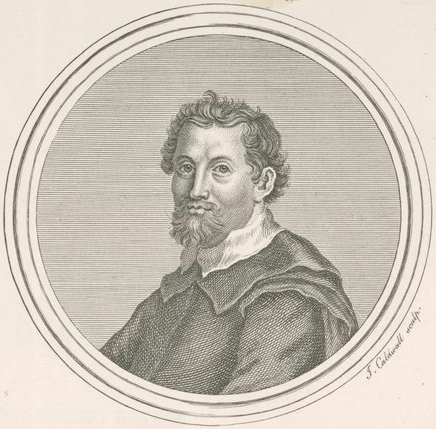
Ruggiero Giovannelli. Portrait by James Caldwall.

Ruggiero Giovannelli (c. 1560 – 7 January 1625) was an Italian composer of the late Renaissance and early Baroque eras. He was a member of the Roman School, and succeeded Palestrina at St. Peter's.

== Life ==
He was born in Velletri, near Rome. It has been claimed that he was a student of Palestrina, but there is no documentary evidence of this; stylistic similarities between their music and an obvious close career association make it a reasonable assumption. Not much is known about Giovannelli's life until 1583, when he became maestro di cappella at San Luigi dei Francesi, a post which he held until 1591, at which time he went to the Collegio Germanico. In addition to these posts, he was maestro di cappella for Duke Giovanni Angelo of Altaemps, at his private chapel, probably concurrently with his other jobs. He also sang and served in various administrative posts.

Giovannelli's most important appointment was as the replacement for Palestrina as the maestro di cappella at the Julian Chapel at St. Peter's, on 12 March 1594, a position which he held until 1599, when he became a singer at the Sistine Chapel. In 1614, he became maestro di cappella at the Sistine Chapel, and he retired in 1624. He is buried in the church of Santa Marta.

== Music and influence ==
Giovanelli composed and published a large number of secular pieces. He is noted for his church music, most of which also survives in manuscript. As could be expected for a composer of the Roman School, his sacred music was conservative, and mostly in the Palestrina style for the first part of his career; however, after 1600, he experimented with some of the stylistic innovations which defined the beginning of the Baroque era, such as the stile concertato and the basso continuo. His output of sacred music fell off dramatically late in his life, and at least one scholar has suggested that this was because he was uncomfortable with the new style. In 1615, he created a new edition of the Graduale known as the Medicean, published by the Medici press. (The Encyclopedia Americana may contradict this, writing that a Editio Medicæa of the Graduale of 1614 was created by Felice Anerio.)

He wrote masses and motets, some of which are for as many as 12 voices, and which often use polychoral techniques.

For a Roman School composer and a priest, he wrote a surprising amount of secular music, mostly madrigals and canzonettas, some of which are in a light-hearted style influenced by northern Italian models, or by Luca Marenzio, who had spent time in Rome. He wrote three books of madrigals for five voices and two books for four voices, as well as a large quantity of other secular songs which were not collected in publications; most have been dated to the 1580s and 1590s.

Giovannelli's music was reprinted widely, in Italy and elsewhere, indicating his broad popularity.

== Works ==
Sources are incomplete, and may differ about his published works. There appear to have been at least three volumes of five books, five- and eight-part motets and three part canzonets (or canzonettes, instrumentals performed as entrances or introductions) (1592); Villanelle a 3 voci (1593); Misse (1593); Motetti (1594); Madrigale (1586); Book Three for Five Voices (1599); Vilanelle a 5 voci (1608). There are masses, motets, and psalms in manuscript at the Vatican Library, among them a Miserere for four and eight voices and a mass for eight, on Palestrina's madrigal Vestiva i colli. Other madrigals are in the collections of Girolamo Scotto and Phalesisu; and motets and psalms in those of Fabio Costantini and Karl Proske.

=== Publications ===
- Gli sdruccioli … Il primo libro de madrigali a 4 (Rome, 1585)
- Il primo libro de madrigali a 5 (1586)
- Il primo libro delle villanelle et arie alla napolitana a 3 (Rome, 1588)
- Gli sdruccioli … libro secondo a 4, con una caccia in ultimo, 4–8vv (Venice, 1589)
- Il secondo libro de madrigali a 5 (1593)
- Sacrarum modulationum … liber primus, 5, 8vv (Rome, 1593)
- Terzo libro de madrigali a 5 voci (1599)
- Motecta … liber secundus, 5vv (Venice, 1604)
- 3 motets for equal voices
- Carmina Sacra; 17 motets for 3 equal voices
- La Terra, che dal fondo
- O Fortunata Rosa
- Tu nascesti
- Musica tolta da i madrigali di Claudio Monteverde, e d'altri autori (Milan 1607) contains sacred contrafacta by Aquilino Coppini on madrigals by Giovannelli; among them are:
  - Deus noster fidelis
  - O quam inanes
  - Sanctissima Maria
  - Moritur in ligno
  - Suauissime Iesu
  - Dulce est & iucundum
  - L'Amorosa Ero

== Midi ==
- Midi performance of Sancti-Maria

== Sources and further reading ==
- Dedford, Ruth I. (1980). "Ruggiero Giovannelli". The New Grove Dictionary of Music and Musicians. London: Macmillan Publishers. ISBN 1-56159-174-2.
- Reese, Gustave (1954). Music in the Renaissance. New York: W.W. Norton & Co. ISBN 0-393-09530-4.
