= Felice Anerio =

Italian composer (1560–1614)

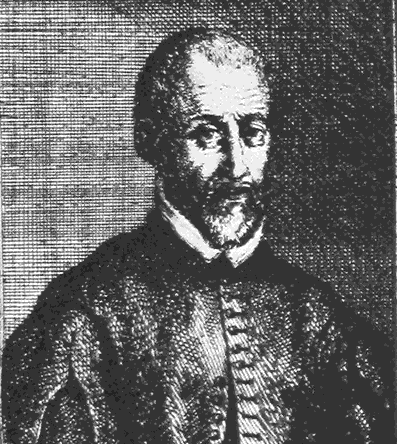
Felice Anerio

Felice Anerio (c. 1560 – 26 or 27 September 1614) was an Italian composer of the late Renaissance and early Baroque eras, and a member of the Roman School of composers. He was the older brother of another important, and somewhat more progressive composer of the same period, Giovanni Francesco Anerio.

== Life ==
Anerio was born in Rome and lived his entire life there. He sang as a boy soprano at the Julian Chapel (the Cappella Giulia) from 1568 until 1577 (by which time he was an alto) and then he sang at another church until 1580. Around this time, he began to compose, especially madrigals; this was one of the few periods in his life during which he wrote secular music. He was likely influenced by Luca Marenzio, who was hugely popular at the time and who was in Rome at the same time Anerio began composing. By 1584, Anerio had been appointed maestro di cappella at the Collegio degli Inglesi; he also seems to have been the choirmaster at another society of Rome's leading musicians called the vertuosa Compagnia de i Musici di Roma. These positions must have given him considerable opportunity to exercise his compositional talents, for he had already written the music, songs, madrigals, and choruses for an Italian Passion Play by this time. In 1594, he replaced Palestrina as the official composer to the papal choir, which was the most prominent position in Rome for a composer.

In 1607 or shortly afterwards, he became a priest (a common career path for a composer in the Roman School). In conjunction with Francesco Soriano, another composer of the Roman School, he helped to reform the responsories of the Roman Gradual, another of the late activities of the Counter-Reformation in Italy.

== Works ==
Anerio was a conservative composer, who largely used the style of Palestrina as a starting point, at least after his youthful period of writing secular works, such as madrigals and canzonettas, was done. Nevertheless, he achieved an expressive intensity which was his own. Some influence of the Northern Italian progressive movements is evident, though muted, in his work. For instance, the use of double choirs (polychoral works were the norm in Venice): quick homophonic declamatory textures, quick melodic passages in the bass line (which were an influence from monody). In addition, he sometimes used quickly changing textures, alternating between full chorus and small groups of two or three voices, another progressive trait of the northern Italian schools – a trait much in evidence, for example, in the music of Claudio Monteverdi. In his very last works, the influence of Viadana, the popularizer of the basso continuo, is evident, but he still remained true to the Palestrina style in his melodic and harmonic writing. Anerio wrote no known purely instrumental music.

Works by Felice Anerio include:

=== Sacred vocal ===
- Two books of Madrigali Spirituali (both Rome, 1585)
- Two books of sacred hymns (Venice, 1596 and Rome, 1596)
- Holy Week Responsories (for four voices, Rome, 1606)
- 13 Spiritual canzonettas; 12 motets, including many for 8 voices; psalms, litany, other works, many including a basso continuo
- Madrigals, choruses, solo songs for Passio de Nostro Signore in verso heroico (Viterbo, 1604)

=== Secular vocal ===
- One book of canzonettas (1586)
- Five books of madrigals (one of which is lost) (1587, 1590, 1598, 1602, unknown)
- Miscellaneous other madrigals not included in the main publications

Many magnificats, hymns, motets, and other works were printed by Karl Proske in his Musica Divina (1854).
