= Giovanni Dragoni =

Italian composer

Giovanni Andrea Dragoni (or Draconi, c. 1540 – December 1598) was an Italian composer of the Roman School of the late Renaissance, a student of Giovanni Pierluigi da Palestrina, and a prominent composer and maestro di cappella in Rome in the late 16th century. He left numerous sacred and secular works, almost all vocal, and was especially noted for his often-reprinted books of madrigals.

== Life ==
Dragoni was born at Meldola, not far from Forlì, but details of his early life are lacking. He studied with Palestrina, as he indicated in the dedication to his first book of madrigals (1575). The next year he acquired the prestigious position of maestro di cappella at one of Rome's most prominent churches and musical establishments, St. John Lateran, and he retained this position for the rest of his life. In 1594, towards the end of his life, Cardinal del Monte appointed Dragoni to assess the progress on the revisions to liturgical chant, part of the extensive reforms following from the Council of Trent. Dragoni died in Rome.

== Music ==
Dragoni's output was extensive, but much of his sacred music, kept in the St. John Lateran archive, has been lost, including a collection of settings of the Lamentations of Jeremiah (along with similar settings by Annibale Stabile), as well as a volume of settings of the Magnificat. He wrote at least six books of motets, of which five have been lost.

He published seven books of madrigals, for four, five, and six voices, between 1575 and 1594. They were often reprinted, attesting to their popularity.

Influences on Dragoni included his teacher Palestrina, especially early in his career, and later the renowned madrigalist Luca Marenzio. Dragoni's style emphasized clearly intelligible text setting, but by the 1590s his music shows an increasing emphasis on soprano and bass lines, as well as an understanding of motivic unity, both characteristics of the developing Baroque style. In addition he experimented with polychoral textures in some of his later works, a feature more prominent in Venetian than Roman music.

== References and further reading ==
- Patricia Ann Myers: "Giovanni Dragoni", Grove Music Online, ed. L. Macy (Accessed June 23, 2006), (subscription access)
- Gustave Reese, Music in the Renaissance. New York, W.W. Norton & Co., 1954. ISBN 0-393-09530-4
