= Paolo Bellasio =

Italian composer and organist

- Born: 20 May 1554; Verona
- Died: July 10, 1594 (aged 40)
- Occupation: Composer Organist

Paolo Bellasio (20 May 1554 – 10 July 1594) was an Italian composer and organist of the late Renaissance. He is generally considered to be a member of the Roman School, though unusually for the group he seems to have written only madrigals.

Information on his early life is scarce. He was born in Verona, lived in Rome in 1582 in the service of Cardinal Filippo Boncompagni, and then in the next year traveled throughout Calabria, probably looking for a job as an organist. In 1584 and 1585 he held a series of part-time posts at various churches in Rome. Orvieto Cathedral hired him in 1587, but he did not stay long, returning to Verona in 1589. In the early 1590s he returned to Rome for reasons unknown, and died there. According to his epitaph, Pope Clement VIII granted him the title Knight of the Golden Spur.

Bellasio published five books of madrigals, in a well-crafted, conservative and contrapuntal idiom. In addition he wrote a book of villanelle which included a part for lute, as well as a group of canzonettas. The lack of sacred music in his output is striking, especially for a Roman at the end of the 16th century, though perhaps some of his music has not survived.

== References and further reading ==
- Patricia Ann Myers, "Paolo Bellasio", in The New Grove Dictionary of Music and Musicians, ed. Stanley Sadie. 20 vol. London, Macmillan Publishers Ltd., 1980. ISBN 1-56159-174-2
- Gustave Reese, Music in the Renaissance. New York, W.W. Norton & Co., 1954. ISBN 0-393-09530-4
