= Luigi Tansillo =

Italian poet (1510–1568)

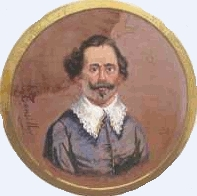
- Portrait of Luigi Tansillo
- Born: 1510; Venosa, Kingdom of Naples
- Died: 1 December 1568 (aged 57–58); Teano, Kingdom of Naples
- Occupations: Poet; Intellectual; Soldier; Civil servant
- Known for: Lagrime di San Pietro
- Parent(s): Vincenzo Tansillo and Laura Tansillo (née Del Cappellano)
- Writing career
- Language: Italian
- Genre: Poetry
- Movements: Late Renaissance; Petrarchism

Luigi Tansillo (1510 – 1 December 1568) was an Italian Late Renaissance poet. Tansillo deserves a special place in the history of Italian poetry, for he constitutes the link between the classical lyric of the Cinquecento and the baroque lyric of the Seicento.

== Biography ==
Luigi Tansillo was born in Venosa in 1510, in a family of the minor nobility, and spent the early years of his life in Venosa and Nola. Around the year 1532 Tansillo moved to Naples, where he befriended the noted Spanish poets Garcilaso de la Vega and Juan Boscán. In 1535 he entered the service of the Spanish viceroy of Naples Pedro Álvarez de Toledo. From this point until 1553, Tansillo accompanied don Pedro and his son don García (captain of the Neapolitan fleet from 1535) on numerous military and political missions in the Mediterranean. In 1551 the poet married Luisa Puccio and published his first collection of poems, the Sonetti per la presa d'Africa. In 1561 he was appointed governor of Gaeta, a position he kept until his death. Tansillo was in contact with Annibale Caro and Benedetto Varchi, and became a member of the Florentine Accademia degli Umidi in 1544. He died in Teano on 1 December 1568, aged 58.

== Work ==
Tansillo began his literary career with the publication of the pastoral drama I due pellegrini (‘The two pilgrims’) in 1527. The "rustic" poem in ottava rima Il vendemmiatore (‘The Grape Gatherer’, 1532) combines a celebration of carnal love and enjoyment of life with elegiac evocations of the golden age and fleeting youth. The work was considered licentious enough to be placed on the Index Librorum Prohibitorum by Pope Paul IV. Stanze a Bernardino Martirano (‘Stanzas for Bernardino Martirano’, 1540) recounts the vicissitudes of the sea journey that Tansillo had taken with Toledo's son, don García. The mythological poem Clorida (1547) uses the story of a nymph who inhabits the country villa of Tansillo's protector as a pretext for descriptions of the natural setting and praise of don García's military prowess. Other works of interest inclucde the didactic poem La balia (‘The nurse’, 1552) and Il podere (‘The farm’, 1560), an idyll celebrating serene country life inspired by Columella. Tansillo's fame depends principally on the religious epic Le lagrime di San Pietro (‘The tears of Saint Peter’, 1585), a poem in fifteen cantos of ottava rima imbued with Counter-Reformation moral and religious fervour which is now best known as the model for Malherbe's Les Larmes de saint Pierre (1587).

== Legacy ==
Tansillo is considered the most important Southern Italian Petrarchist, and was admired by Torquato Tasso and Giambattista Marino, no doubt for his anticipations of the Baroque manner. His original reelaboration of Petrarchan and classical models expressed itself most significantly through his intensely sensual descriptions of natural landscapes, the musicality of his verse, and his virtuosic shows of technical ability, often through the use of unusual conceits. Tansillo's lyrics were anthologized in a famous volume published by Gabriele Giolito de' Ferrari in 1552 and carried throughout Europe by foreigners who had visited Italy. Jacquet de Berchem set some of his texts, as did Giovanni Tommaso Benedictis da Pascarola. François de Malherbe’s Larmes de Saint Pierre, imitated from Tansillo, appeared in 1587, and in 1594 Orlando di Lasso also set Le lagrime di San Pietro. William Roscoe’s translation of Tansillo's Nurse appeared in 1798, and went through several editions.

== Works ==
- I due pellegrini (1530)
- Il vendemmiatore (1532–1534)
- Stanze a Bernardino Martirano (1540)
- Clorida (1547)
- La Balia (1552)
- Il podere (1560)
- Le lagrime di San Pietro (1585)
- Liriche
- Il Canzoniere. Tansillo's Canzoniere, the result of a lifetime's work, was only published in 1711.

== Sources ==
- Media related to Luigi Tansillo at Wikimedia Commons
- Ambrosoli, Francesco (1863). Manuale della Letteratura Italiana. Vol. II (2nd ed.). Florence: G. Barbèra Editore.
- Cannata, Nadia (2002). "Tansillo, Luigi". In Peter Hainsworth; David Robey (eds.). The Oxford Companion to Italian Literature. Oxford University Press.
- Milburn, Erika (2003). Luigi Tansillo and Lyric Poetry in Sixteenth-century Naples. Leeds: Maney Publishing for the Modern Humanities Research Association. ISBN 1-902653-97-1.
- Toscano, Tobia R. (2019). "Tansillo, Luigi". Dizionario Biografico degli Italiani (in Italian). Vol. 94: Stampa–Tarantelli. Rome: Institute of the Italian Encyclopaedia. ISBN 978-88-12-00032-6.
- "Tansillo, Luigi (Enciclopedia on line" (in Italian).
