= Giovanni Francesco Anerio =

Italian composer (1569–1630)

Giovanni Francesco Anerio (7 July 1569 - 11 June 1630) was an Italian composer of the Roman School, of the very late Renaissance and early Baroque eras. He was the younger brother of Felice Anerio. Giovanni's principal importance in music history was his contribution to the early development of the oratorio; he represented the progressive trend within the otherwise conservative Roman School, though he also shared some of the stylistic tendencies of his brother, who was much indebted to Palestrina.

== Life ==
He was born in Rome on 7 July 1569. He was a choirboy at Cappella Giulia in St. Peter's under Palestrina from 1575 to 1579. He clearly decided to become a priest from an early age, and became associated with the Oratory of Filippo Neri around 1583. In 1595 he was employed as an organist at S Marcello, and likely became maestro di cappella at the Basilica di San Giovanni in Laterano, after Francesco Soriano, between 1600 or 1601 and 1603. In 1609 he held a similar post at Verona Cathedral, his first appointment outside of Rome; he stayed there until 1610, when he returned to Rome; remaining there (aside from a few travels) until 1624, holding a variety of roles (he became a priest in 1616). In 1624 he took the position of choirmaster to King Sigismund III of Poland in Warsaw. Poland had several active musical centers in the late 16th and early 17th centuries, including Kraków and Warsaw, and often employed Italians and Germans; Anerio was one of the more distinguished foreigners to take up residence there. Unfortunately he never saw Rome again; he died while traveling back home, while in Graz, Austria, and was buried there on 12 June 1630.

== Musical style ==
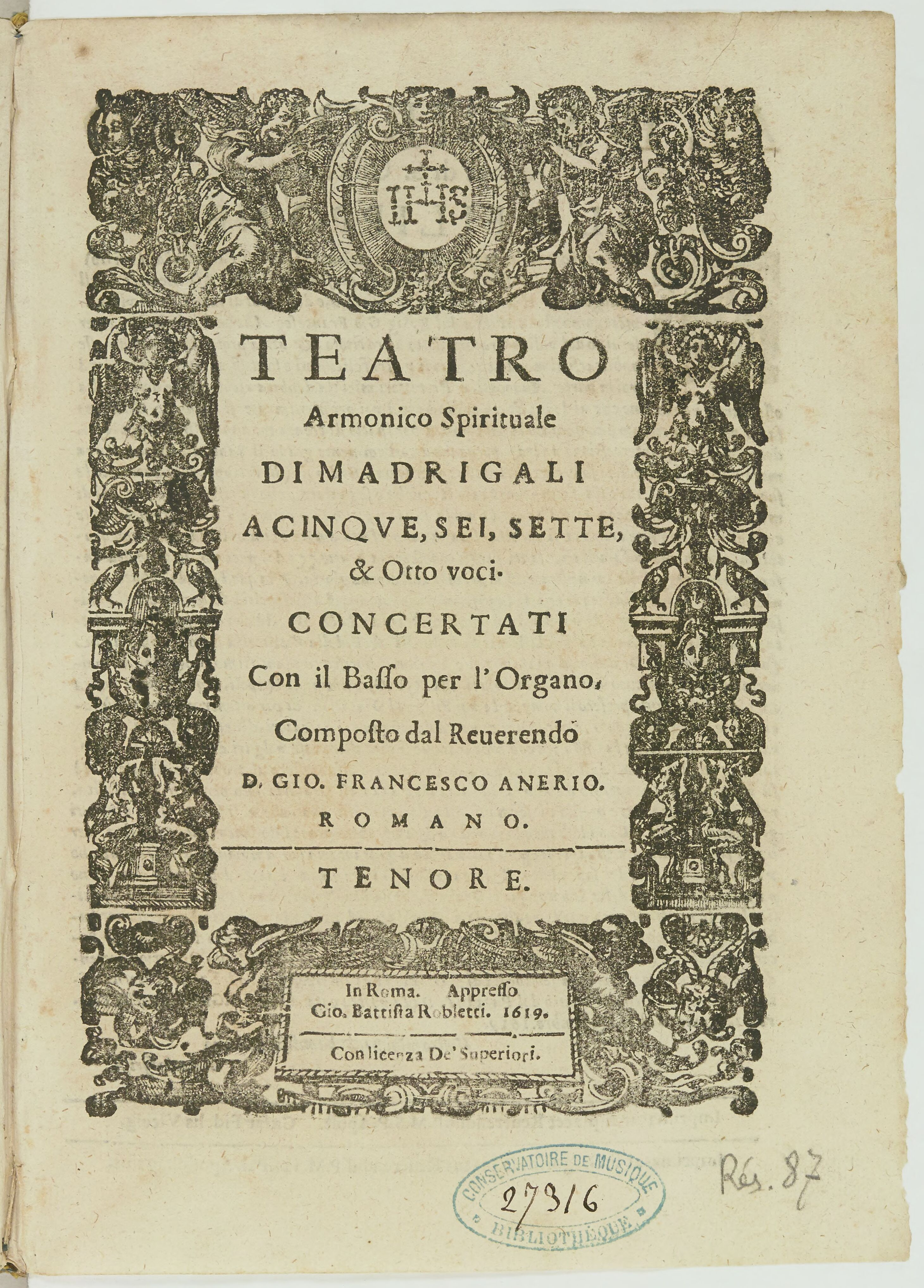
Teatro armonico spirituale

Giovanni Anerio was a much more progressive composer than his brother, and in the conservative environment of Rome in the early 17th century, this was progressive indeed. Many of his madrigals were monodies, borrowing a style which came from Florence and other locations to the north; his motets and masses, on the other hand, are conservative and use the Palestrina style, though the motets include figured bass, another innovation from the first decade of the 17th century. Some influence from Viadana is evident in these pieces.

Some of his masses are polychoral, a technique which involved multiple, spatially separated groups of singers. While this was also a technique which developed in Venice, it was widespread by the end of the 16th century: almost all composers of sacred polyphony used polychoral techniques at some time, especially those working in large acoustical environments (such as most cathedrals in Europe).

The most important achievement of the younger Anerio, however, was his Teatro armonico spirituale of 1619, which is arguably the first oratorio. It includes the earliest surviving obbligato writing for instruments by the Roman School. Instrumentation is indicated with unusual care, and the alternate instrumental and vocal passages were greatly influential in works of the following decades. Unlike the works of the Venetian school, many of which were essentially grandiose motets, the Teatro armonico spirituale was in Italian; it included stories told musically but not acted (as would be done in opera); and voices and instruments alternated movement by movement. The piece included settings of the tale of the Prodigal Son and the Conversion of Saul.

== Works ==
Anerio was a prolific composer, and he wrote motets, litanies, antiphons, "sacred concertos," responsories, psalms, madrigals, much miscellaneous sacred and secular music, as well as a handful of instrumental pieces. Most were published in Rome; many fewer works from his Polish period seem to have been preserved, although two polychoral Masses found in manuscript (one for three choirs) can be attributed to this last phase of his career.

== Sources ==
- Article "Giovanni Francesco Anerio," in The New Grove Dictionary of Music and Musicians, ed. Stanley Sadie. 20 vol. London, Macmillan Publishers Ltd., 1980. ISBN 1-56159-174-2
- Gustave Reese, Music in the Renaissance. New York, W.W. Norton & Co., 1954. ISBN 0-393-09530-4
- Manfred Bukofzer, Music in the Baroque Era. New York, W.W. Norton & Co., 1947. ISBN 0-393-09745-5
