= Roman School (music) =

16–17th-century group of music composers

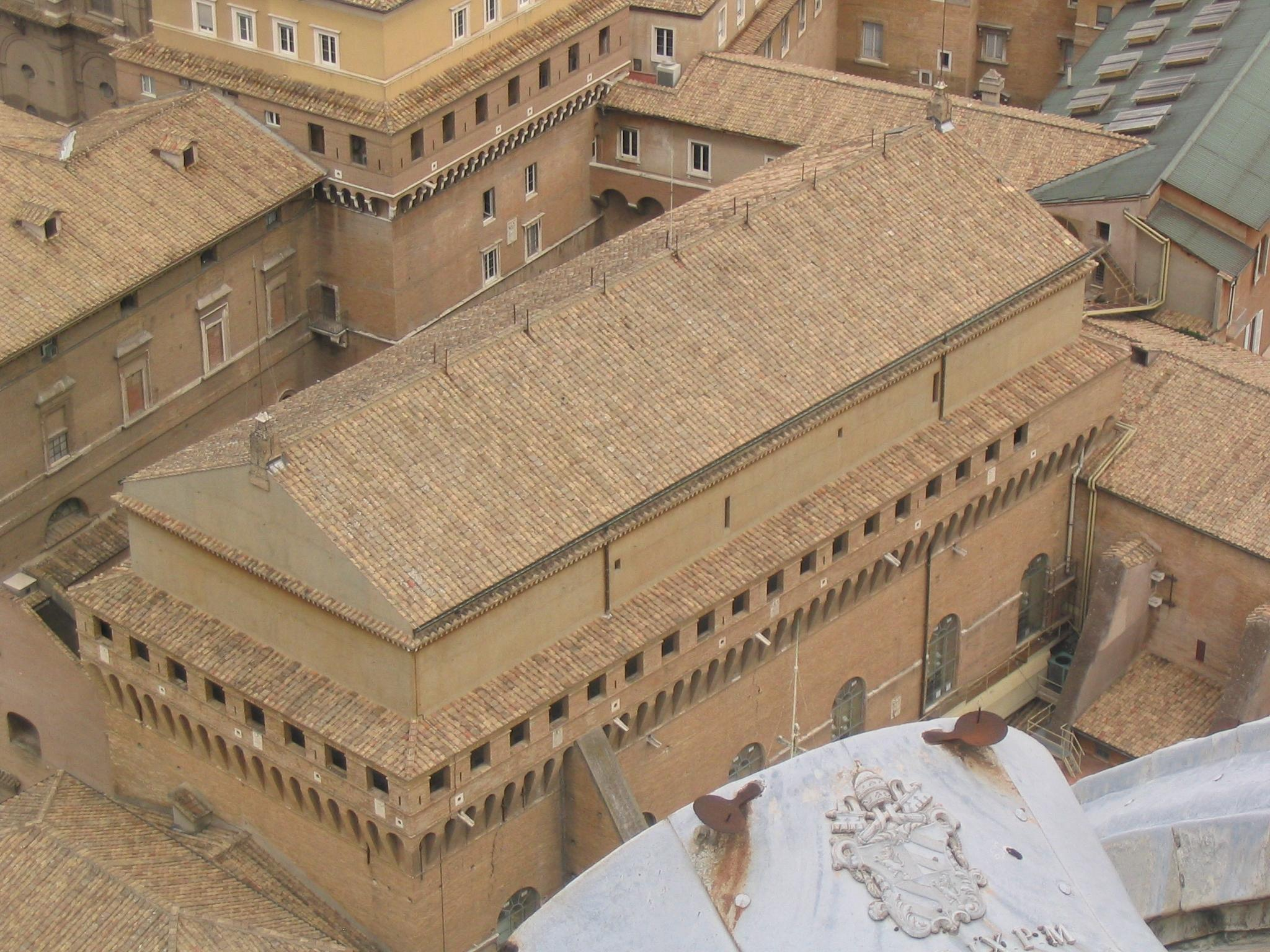
The Sistine Chapel

In music history, the Roman School was a group of composers of predominantly church music, in Rome, during the 16th and 17th centuries, therefore spanning the late Renaissance and early Baroque eras. The term also refers to the music they produced. Many of the composers had a direct connection to the Vatican and the papal chapel, though they worked at several churches; stylistically they are often contrasted with the Venetian School of composers, a concurrent movement which was much more progressive. By far the most famous composer of the Roman School is Giovanni Pierluigi da Palestrina, whose name has been associated for four hundred years with smooth, clear, polyphonic perfection. However, there were other composers working in Rome, and in a variety of styles and forms.

== History and characteristics ==
While composers had almost certainly been working in Rome continuously for the thousand years since the time of Gregory the Great, the development of a consistent style around the middle of the 16th century, due in part to the musical requirements of the Counter-Reformation, led to their being grouped together by music historians under this single label.

The music of the Roman School can be seen as the culmination of a development of polyphony through the infusion of music of the Franco-Netherlandish school during the last hundred years. Franco-Netherlandish composers had long been coming to Italy to live and work—Josquin, Obrecht, Arcadelt, and many others made the long journey, and their musical style was decisive on the formation of the Italian styles. Under the guidance of the Vatican, and with the Sistine Chapel Choir being one of the finest of the time, it was perhaps inevitable that the stylistic center of sacred polyphony would turn out to be Rome.

The Council of Trent, which met from 1545 to 1563, had a significant impact on the music of the Roman School: indeed it can be argued that these reforms in the Roman Catholic Church, which were part of the Counter-Reformation, defined the music of the Roman School. The Council of Trent recommended that sacred music, especially for use in church, be written in a dignified, serious style. The Council allowed polyphony—a common misconception is that they banned it outright, but this is false—however they did require that text which was sung be clearly understandable. In addition, while they did not ban the use of secular melodies as source material for masses and motets, such use was discouraged.

The combination of the reforms of the Council of Trent with the presence of the extremely talented composers inheriting the Franco-Netherlandish style, was the production of a body of music which has sometimes been held to represent the peak of perfection of Renaissance polyphonic clarity. The subject matter of "16th Century Counterpoint" or "Renaissance Polyphony" as taught in contemporary college music curricula is invariably the codified style of the Roman School, as it was understood by Johann Fux in the early 18th century. It is important to recognize, though, that the "Palestrina style" was not the only polyphonic style of the time, though it may have been the most internally consistent. The polyphonic style of Palestrina may have been the culmination of a hundred years of development of the Franco-Netherlandish style, but it was one of many streams in the late 16th century, and significantly contrasts with the music of the Venetian school to the north, as well as the music being produced in France and England at the same time.

Other composers living and working in Rome, while not considered members of the Roman School, certainly influenced them. The most famous of these is probably Luca Marenzio, whose madrigals were wildly popular in Italy and elsewhere in Europe; some of the composers of the Roman School borrowed his expressive techniques, for instance word painting, for occasional use in a liturgical setting.

While the Roman School is considered to be a conservative musical movement, there are important exceptions. Rome was the birthplace of the oratorio, in the work of Giovanni Francesco Anerio and Emilio de' Cavalieri; the score for Cavalieri's Rappresentatione di Anima, et di Corpo is the earliest printed score which uses a figured bass. The style is similar to the style of monody being developed in Florence at approximately the same time; indeed there was considerable competition between composers in those two musical centers. The success of Rappresentatione was such that the monodic style became common in much Roman music in the first several decades of the 17th century.

Later composers of the Roman School included Gregorio Allegri, composer of the famous Miserere (c.1630). This piece was guarded closely by the papal chapel; it was considered so beautiful that copies were not allowed to circulate. A favorite story involves the 14-year-old Mozart, who made the first illegal copy by transcribing it from memory after hearing it only twice. Many of the later composers of the Roman School continued to write in the polyphonic style of the 16th century, known then as the stile antico, or the prima pratica, in distinction to the newer style of monody and the stile concertato which defined the beginning of the Baroque era.

== Composers ==
Members of the Roman School, including some who were active in Rome for only part of their careers, are as follows:

- Giovanni Pierluigi da Palestrina (c. 1525–1594)
- Tomás Luis de Victoria (1548–1611)
- Giovanni Animuccia (c. 1520–1571)
- Felice Anerio (c. 1564–1614)
- Giovanni Francesco Anerio (c. 1567–1630) (Younger brother of Felice)
- Gregorio Allegri (1582–1652) (composer of the famous Miserere)
- Paolo Bellasio (1554–1594)
- Antonio Cifra (1584–1629)
- Domenico Allegri (c. 1585–1629)
- Marc'Antonio Ingegneri (c. 1545–1592)
- Giovanni Maria Nanino (1543–1607)
- Emilio de' Cavalieri (c. 1550–1602)
- Annibale Stabile (c. 1535–1595)
- Giovanni Dragoni (c. 1540–1598)
- Francesco Soriano (c. 1548–1621)
- Paolo Quagliati (c. 1555–1628)
- Ruggiero Giovannelli (c. 1560–1625)
- Giovanni Bernardino Nanino (1560–1623)
- Stefano Landi (1587–1639)
- Domenico Mazzocchi (1592–1665)
- Luigi Rossi (c. 1597–1653)
- Virgilio Mazzocchi (1597–1646)
- Michelangelo Rossi (c. 1600-1656)
- Francesco Foggia (1604–1688)
- Annibale Zoilo (c. 1537–1592)
- Bartolomeo Roy (c. 1530–1599)
- Giovanni de Macque (c. 1550–1614)
- Johannes Matelart (before 1538–1607)
- Rinaldo del Mel (c. 1554–1598)
- Marco Marazzoli (c. 1602–1662)
- Giacomo Carissimi (1605–1674)
