= Paolo Quagliati =

Italian composer

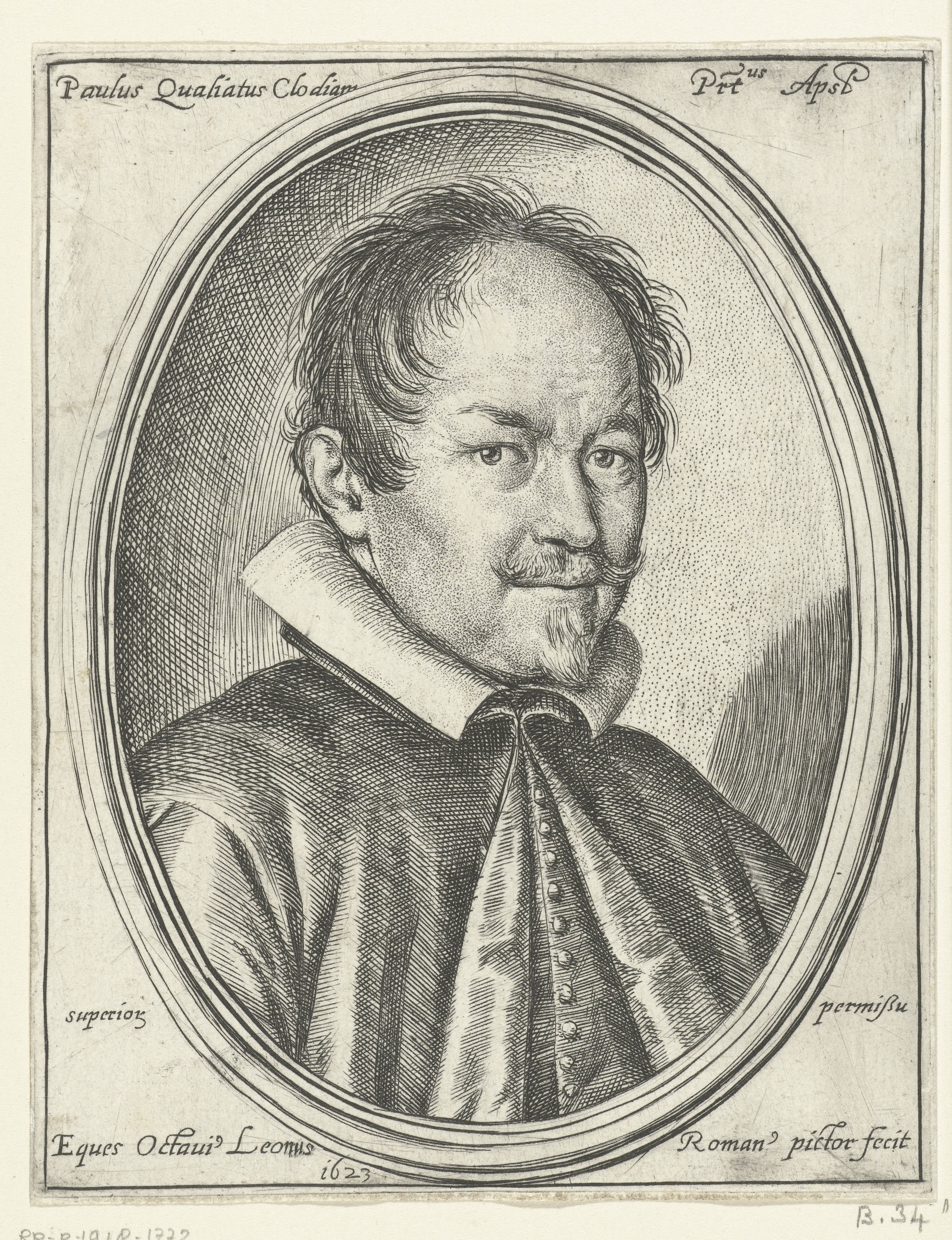
Paolo Quagliati, after a portrait by Ottavio Leoni (1623).

Paolo Quagliati (c. 1555 – 16 November 1628) was an Italian composer of the early Baroque era and a member of the Roman School of composers. He was a transitional figure between the late Renaissance style and the earliest Baroque and was one of the first to write solo madrigals in the conservative musical center of Rome.

== Life ==
Quagliati was born in Chioggia to an aristocratic family. Most of his life he spent in the service of various royal and aristocratic families. In 1594 he became a Roman citizen, and between 1605 and 1608 Quagliati was employed by Cardinal Odoardo Farnese. Most likely he was organist at Santa Maria Maggiore from around 1608 until his death. During that time he also served as organist for various formal occasions around the city, and eventually he became private chamberlain to Pope Gregory XV. Towards the end of his life he was much respected, if not renowned, by his fellow composers, as can be judged from dedications of collections of music to him; however, some of this may have been due less to the quality of his music than to his direct papal connections and immense influence.

== Works and style ==
Stylistically, Quagliati's music is clear, elegant, and he generally uses simple diatonic harmonies. Some of his books of madrigals are in two versions: one for singing by equal voice parts, in the old Renaissance style, and another in what he calls the "empty" style, for single voice with instrumental accompaniment. These were examples of the new Baroque style of monody, and he states as much in the preface to his 1608 publication: "I have decided to cater to both tastes." Quagliati was probably the first to publish solo madrigals in Rome, though monody in the form of solo madrigals had already existed for more than twenty years in northern Italy.

He wrote both sacred and secular vocal music, as well as some instrumental music. In his instrumental music, he makes little or no distinction between the style assigned to pieces with certain labels, such as ricercars or canzonas; this was an occasional practice at the time, and quite an annoying one to musicologists attempting to categorize music during this transitional period. Conventionally, a canzona around 1600 was a sectional instrumental piece, while a ricercar was a rather severe contrapuntal study, one of the ancestors of the fugue; the work of a few composers such as Quagliati make it necessary to qualify these terms as being of imprecise usage.

In 1606 he composed Il carro di fedeltà d'amore, which is considered the first secular 'azione scenica' in Rome.

Of his surviving larger-scale works, one of the most interesting is La sfera armoniosa, which includes no less than 25 separate sections, including vocal solos and duets, all with an accompanying violin part. Much of it is written in the stile concertato imported from northern Italy, though it would have seemed tame to a Venetian composer. He wrote this large work for the wedding of the nephew of the pope to Isabella Gesualdo, daughter of the famously murderous composer Carlo Gesualdo.
