= Lagrime di San Pietro =

Musical piece

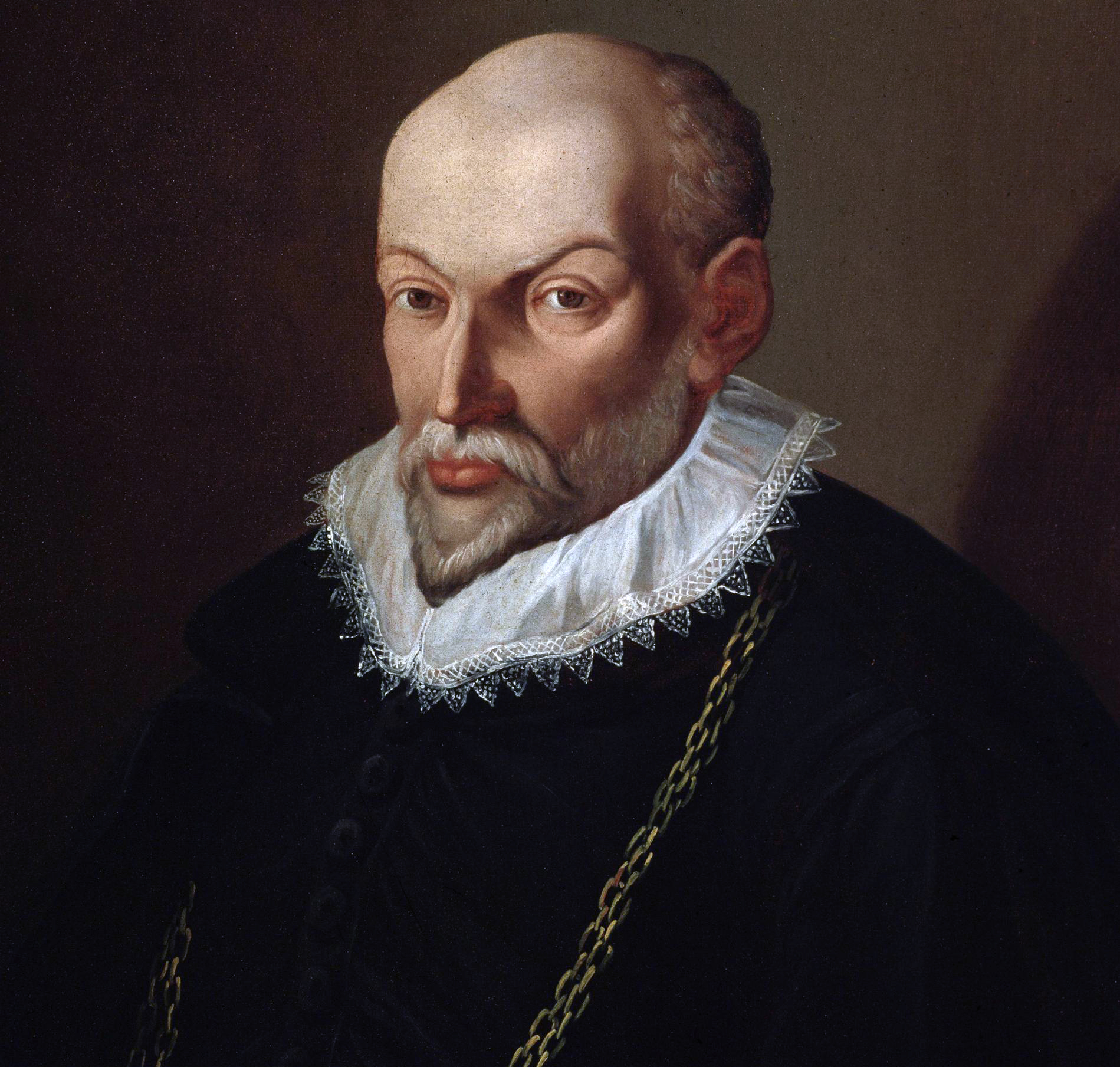
Portrait of Orlande de Lassus

The Lagrime di San Pietro (Italian: Saint Peter's Tears) is a cycle of 20 madrigals and a concluding motet by the late Renaissance composer Orlande de Lassus (Roland de Lassus). Written in 1594 for seven voices, it is structured as three sequences of seven compositions. The Lagrime was to be Lassus’ last composition: he dedicated it to Pope Clement VIII on May 24, 1594, three weeks before his death, and it was published in Munich the next year.

== Content ==
The Lagrime sets 20 poems by the Italian poet Luigi Tansillo (1510–1568) depicting the stages of grief experienced by St. Peter after his denial of Christ, and his memory of Christ's admonition (Matthew 26:69–75). The settings by Lassus are for seven voices, and numerical symbolism plays a part throughout: the seven voices represent the seven sorrows of the Virgin Mary; in addition many of the madrigals are in seven sections. The total number of pieces in the set, 21, represents seven times the number of members of the trinity.

In addition, Lassus only sets seven of the eight church modes (modes I through VII), leaving mode VIII entirely out. The madrigals are grouped by successive mode, with madrigals 1 through 4 in mode I, 5 to 8 in mode II, 9 to 12 in modes III and IV, 13 to 15 in mode V, 16 to 18 in mode VI, 19 and 20 in mode VII, and the closing motet based on the tonus peregrinus, entirely outside the Renaissance scheme of the eight church modes. According to David Crook, writing in his 1994 book on the Lassus Magnificat settings:

Mode eight's conspicuous absence and thereby the incomplete representation of the eight-member system in the first twenty madrigals mirror the words of Saint Peter and symbolize all that is imperfect in the world just as surely as the adoption of another tone outside the system for the words of Christ in the Latin envoi serves as a symbol for the other world to come.

Musically, the Lagrime are a summation of Lassus's style throughout his career, and he himself indicated in his dedication that they were recently composed. Within the cycle he uses techniques he learned early in his career as a composer of secular madrigals; chromaticism related to his much earlier musica reservata masterpiece Prophetiae Sibyllarum; and the concise, refined, almost austere language he developed late in his career, related to the Palestrina style, in which no note is superfluous. The music sets the text syllabically, with careful regard for diction, and contains pauses where a speaker would naturally stop for breath; and it is entirely through-composed, without repetition or redundancy.

The final piece in the set is not a madrigal, but rather a Latin motet: Vide homo, quae pro te patior (Behold, man, how I suffer for you). Here the crucified Christ, speaking in the first person, confronts Peter's betrayal and indeed the sinfulness of all mankind.

== Canonical status ==
The Lagrime di San Pietro is probably the most famous set of madrigali spirituali ever written. Although sacred madrigals were a small subset of the total output of madrigals, this set by Lassus is often considered by scholars to be one of the highest achievements of Renaissance polyphony, and appeared at the end of an age: within 10 years of its composition, the traditional stile antico had been displaced in many centers by new early Baroque forms such as monody and the sacred concerto for few voices and basso continuo. Of the work, musicologist Alfred Einstein wrote in his 1949 opus The Italian Madrigal: "it is ... a spiritual counterpart to the cycles from the great epics of Ariosto and Tasso, an old man's work, comparable in its artistry, its dimensions, its asceticism only to the Musical Offering and the Art of Fugue."
