= Marianne Sessi =

Italian soprano and composer

Marianne Sessi Natorp (died 10 March 1847) was an Italian soprano and canzonetta composer. Her birth date is listed as 1770, 1771, 1773, or 1776 in various sources. She was best known as a member of the musical Sessi dynasty and a renowned operatic soprano who performed and composed as Marianne or Marianna Sessi. She toured internationally throughout Europe, and was awarded a gold medal by the Academy of Fine Arts in Florence.

== Life ==
Sessi was born in Rome to Franziska Lepri and Giovanni Sessi, who were both singers, as were Sessi's four younger sisters Imperatrice, Anna-Maria, Victoria, and Carolina. Sessi studied voice with her father and debuted at the Italian Opera in Vienna during the 1792–93 season. She performed at the Teatro La Fenice opening on 16 May 1792 in Venice, and then sang at court theatre in Vienna in 1793. In 1794, she married Franz Joseph Edler von Natorp, who became a baron in 1801. She stopped performing in 1796, but returned to the stage in 1805 after the couple divorced, singing in operas by Domenico Cimarosa, Simon Mayr, Wolfgang Amadeus Mozart, Giovanni Paisiello, Antonio Salieri, and Niccolò Zingarelli. In 1807, the Academy of Fine Arts in Florence awarded Sessi a gold medal. She toured internationally, singing throughout eastern and western Europe, Russia, and Scandinavia from 1817 through until 1836.

Sessi stopped performing in 1836 and worked as a singing teacher at the Berlin Royal Opera, ultimately moving to Vienna where she lived with her sister Anna-Maria until her death.

== Compositions ==
Sessi was best known as a singer, but she also composed canzonettas which were published by Breitkopf & Hartel. Her vocal compositions include:

- "Amare un Infedele Veder si Abandonare"
- "Di Puri Affeti Miei"
- "E Dunque Vero"
- "Ecce Quel Fiero Instante"
- "Nasce Nel Vago Aprile Porporea Rosa"
- Nocturne (two voices and piano)
- "Non t’Accostar a l’Urna"
- "Placido Zeffiretto"
- "Sempre piu t’Amo"
- "Stanco di Pascolar le Pecorelle"
- Ten Canzonettes
- Three Canzonettes
