= Pietro Cerone =

Italian music theorist, singer and priest

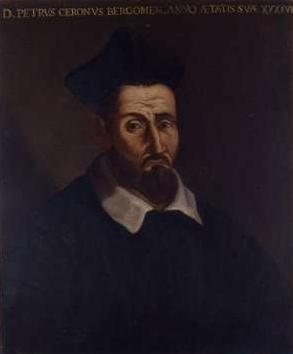
Portrait of Pietro Cerone

Pietro Cerone (1566–1625) was an Italian music theorist, singer and priest of the late Renaissance. He is most famous for an enormous music treatise he wrote in 1613, which is useful in the studying compositional practices of the 16th century.

== Life ==
Cerone was born in Bergamo. While Italian, he spent most of his life in Spanish-dominated Naples, Sardinia, and later in Spain: he did most of his writing in Spanish. He was unusual in being an Italian musician in Spain; far more often in the 16th century, Spanish musicians went to Italy, as in the case of Victoria. In 1603 he returned to Naples, where he was a priest and singer until his death. It was in Naples that he wrote his two most famous treatises.

== Writings ==
The first of these, in Italian, was Le regole più necessarie per l'introduzione del canto fermo, which he published in 1609. It was a didactic and practical work on singing plainsong, which he probably used in his work at the Neapolitan church of Ss Annunziata. Four years later, however, he published a monumental volume on music theory, El melopeo y maestro: tractado de música theorica y pratica; en que se pone por extenso; lo que uno para hazerse perfecto musico ha menester saber, which consisted of 22 volumes, 849 chapters, and 1160 pages in the original Spanish.

El melopeo achieved considerable notoriety, and was sufficiently famous as late as 1803 to be lampooned by the Spanish novelist Antonio Eximeno, who compared it to the chivalric romances in Don Quixote: an impossibly detailed and absurd compilation of nonsense. Other writers in the 18th and 19th centuries have called it "monstrous." However the treatise contains passages which give insight into the compositional practices of the time.

Cerone was musically conservative, and his conservatism in this influential treatise doubtless had some effect on the delay of the Baroque style arriving in the Iberian peninsula. In his writing he was generally contemptuous of Spanish composers, and lavish in his praise of Italians (which may partially account for the abuse heaped on him by Spanish critics). He discusses the previous theoretical treatises of Zarlino, Vicentino, Juan Bermudo and others; he describes in detail how a composer can achieve expressive intensity when writing masses, motets, madrigals, frottolas, canzonettas, canticles, hymns, psalms, lamentations, ricercares, tientos, strambotti, and other forms of the time. The compositional ideal which he maintained was the style of Palestrina, though curiously he maintained that the "rules" of counterpoint were made to be broken, and should be abandoned as soon as a composer had learned his craft: paradoxically, even in the 21st century, no style of composition is taught in a more rigorous, rule-based way than the polyphonic idiom of Palestrina.

While the treatise shows that he possessed considerable compositional skill, no music by Cerone has survived and he is not known to have published any. He died in Naples.
