= Giovanni Tommaso Benedictis da Pascarola =

Italian composer

Giovanni Tommaso Benedictis da Pascarola, also Giovanni Benedetti da Pascarola (ca. 1550-1560 – before 1601) was an Italian composer of the Renaissance.

Little is known of Giovanni's life. He was presumably born in Pascarola, a village just north of Naples. In 1589, he published a set of madrigals entitled Primo libro de madrigali for five voices, dedicated to Giovan Thomaso Saracino (who is otherwise unknown). He was considered as a replacement for Giovanni Domenico da Nola as maestro di cappella at SS Annunziata in Naples, but Nola was able to retain his position. In 1601, Scipione Cerreto, in his Della prattica musica, notes that Giovanni was an excellent composer but was no longer alive; no other evidence exists to suggest a date of death.

Califano included a madrigal of Pascarola's in his 1584 book of madrigals. Pascarola's works are distinguished by their use of imitation in fugue-like ways. He set twenty poems by Sannazaro, four of Petrarch, and one of Tansillo.
