= Orlando di Lasso =

Franco-Flemish composer (1532–1594)

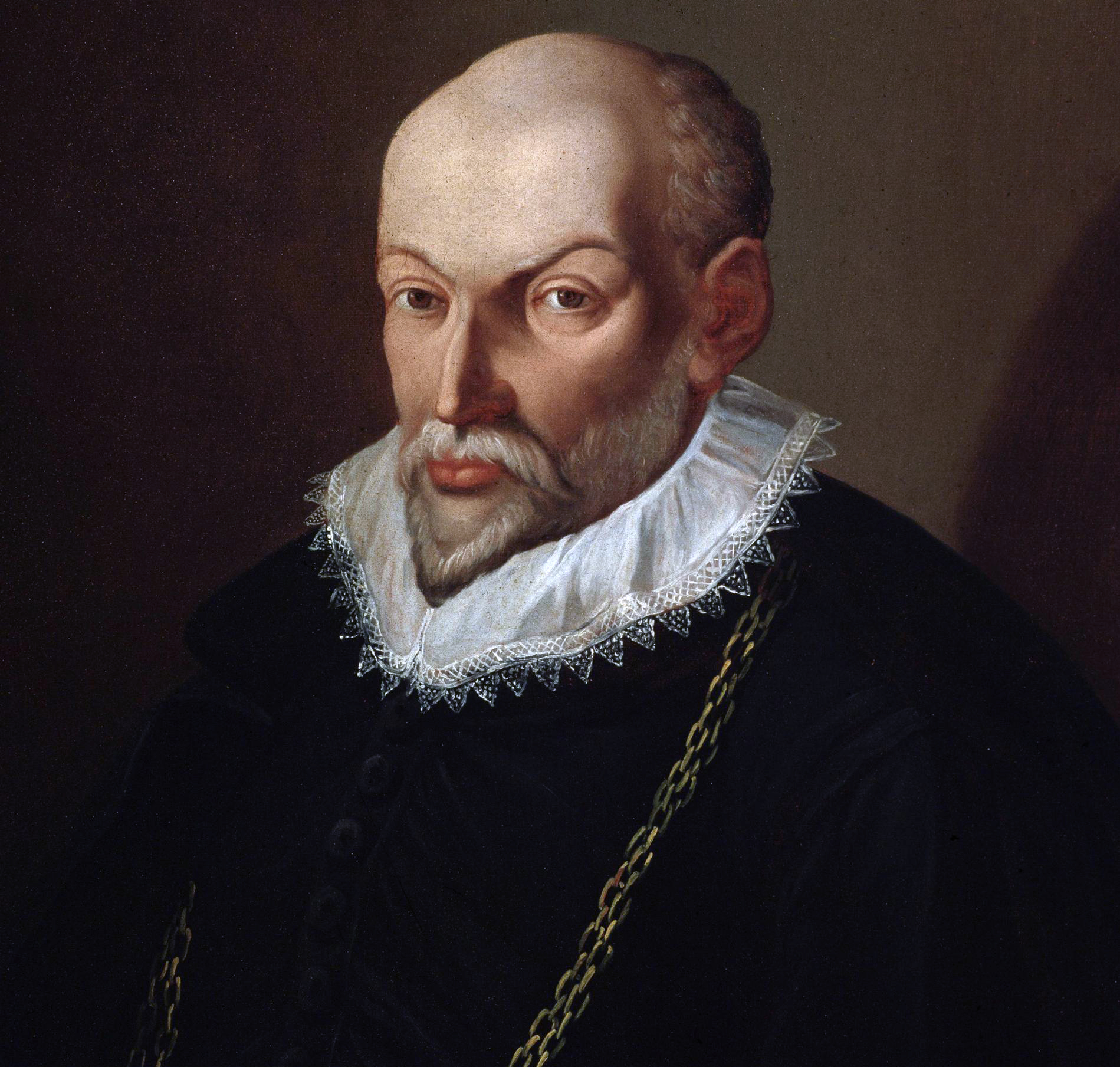
- Orlande de Lassus, collection of Civico Museo Bibliografia Musicale, Bologna
- Born: c. 1532; Mons, County of Hainaut, Habsburg Netherlands
- Died: 14 June 1594; Munich, Duchy of Bavaria, Holy Roman Empire
- Occupations: Composer; Musician

Orlando di Lasso (various other names; probably c. 1532 – 14 June 1594) was a composer of the late Renaissance. The chief representative of the mature polyphonic style in the Franco-Flemish school, Lasso stands with William Byrd, Giovanni Pierluigi da Palestrina, and Tomás Luis de Victoria as one of the leading composers of the later Renaissance. Immensely prolific, his music varies considerably in style and genre, which gave him unprecedented popularity throughout Europe.

== Name ==
Lasso's name appears in many forms, often changed depending on the place in which his music was being performed or published. In addition to Orlando di Lasso, variations include Orlande de Lassus, Roland de Lassus, Orlandus Lassus, Orlande de Lattre and Roland de Lattre.

Since these various spellings or translations of the same name have been known and accepted for centuries, and since there is no evidence that he stated a preference, none of them can be considered incorrect.

== Life and career ==
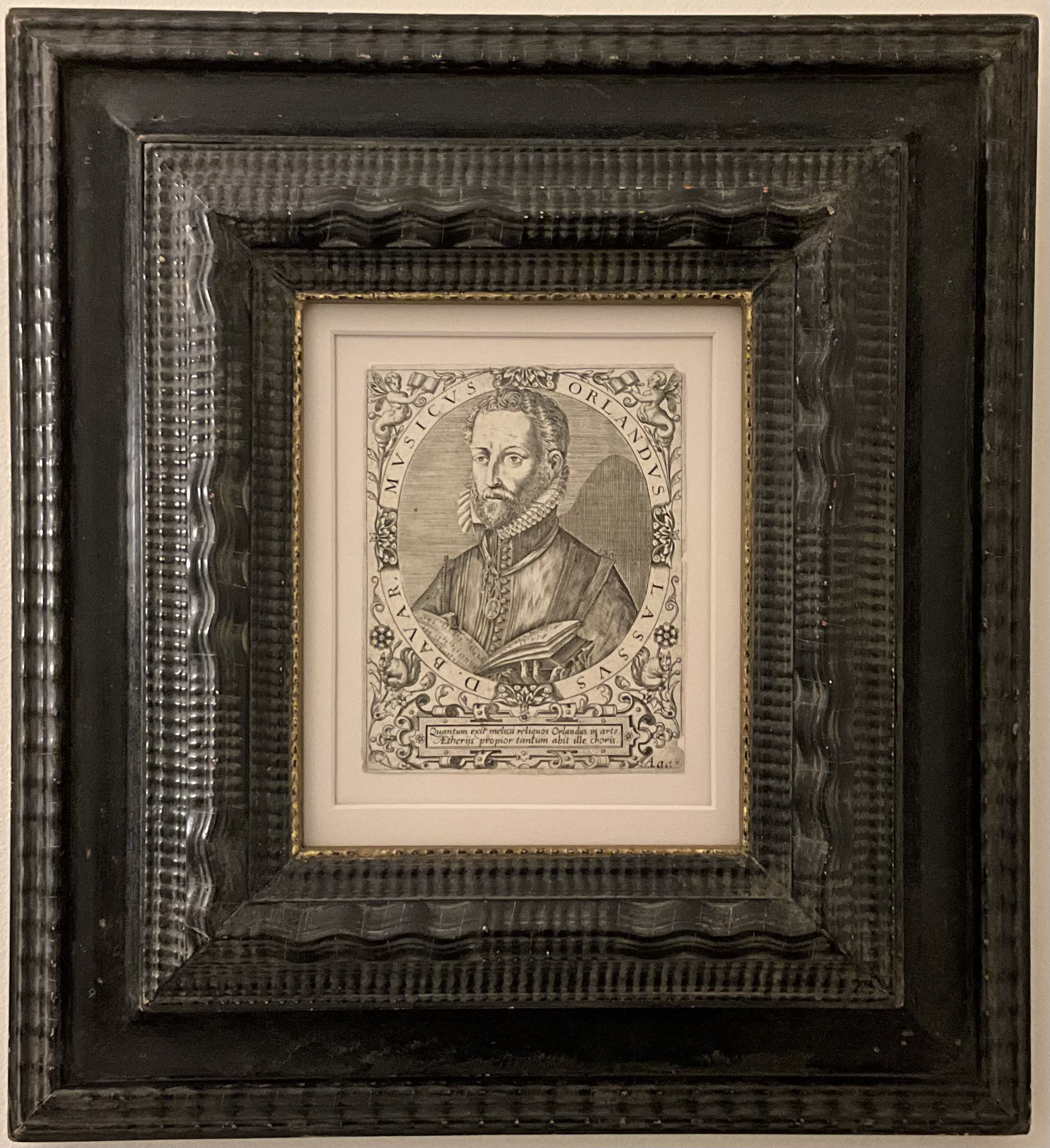
Orlando di Lasso, aged 39. Private collection in Washington, D.C.

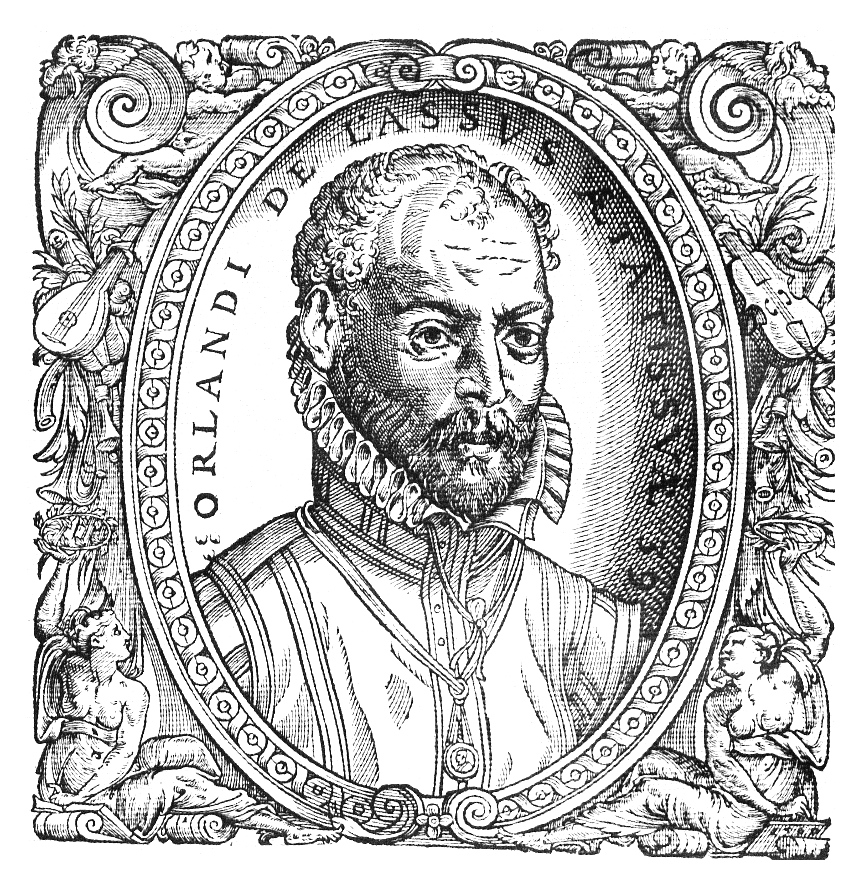
Orlando di Lasso

Orlando di Lasso was born in Mons in the County of Hainaut, Habsburg Netherlands (modern-day Belgium). Information about his early years is scanty, although some uncorroborated stories have survived, the most famous of which is that he was kidnapped three times because of the singular beauty of his singing voice. At the age of twelve, he left the Low Countries with Ferrante Gonzaga and went to Mantua, Sicily, and later Milan (from 1547 to 1549). While in Milan, he made the acquaintance of the madrigalist Spirito l'Hoste da Reggio, a formative influence on his early musical style.

He then worked as a singer and a composer for Costantino Castrioto in Naples in the early 1550s, and his first works are presumed to date from this time. Next he moved to Rome, where he worked for Cosimo I de' Medici, Grand Duke of Tuscany, who maintained a household there, and in 1553, he became maestro di cappella of the Basilica of Saint John Lateran, the ecumenical mother church of Rome and a spectacularly prestigious post indeed for a man only twenty-one years old. However, he stayed there for only a year. (Palestrina would assume this post a year later, in 1555.)

No solid evidence survives for his whereabouts in 1554, but there are contemporary claims that he traveled in France and England. In 1555 he returned to the Low Countries and had his early works published in Antwerp (1555–1556). In 1556 he joined the court of Albrecht V, Duke of Bavaria, who was consciously attempting to create a musical establishment on a par with the major courts in Italy. Lasso was one of several Netherlanders to work there, and by far the most famous. He evidently was happy in Munich and decided to settle there. In 1558 he married Regina Wäckinger, the daughter of a maid of honor of the Duchess. They had two sons, both of whom became composers, and his daughter married the painter Hans von Aachen. By 1563 Lasso had been appointed maestro di cappella, succeeding Ludwig Daser in the post. Lasso remained in the service of Albrecht V and his heir, Wilhelm V, for the rest of his life.

By the 1560s Lasso had become quite famous, and composers began to go to Munich to study with him. Andrea Gabrieli went there in 1562, and possibly remained in the chapel for a year. Giovanni Gabrieli also possibly studied with him in the 1570s. His renown had spread outside strictly musical circles, for in 1570 Emperor Maximilian II conferred nobility upon him, a rare circumstance for a composer. Pope Gregory XIII knighted him and in 1571, and again in 1573, the king of France, Charles IX, invited him to visit. Some of these kings and aristocrats attempted to woo him away from Munich with more attractive offers, but Lasso was evidently more interested in the stability of his position, and the splendid performance opportunities of Albrecht's court, than in financial gain. "I do not want to leave my house, my garden, and the other good things in Munich", he wrote to the Duke of Electorate of Saxony in 1580, upon receiving an offer for a position in Dresden.

In the late 1570s and 1580s Lasso made several visits to Italy, where he encountered the most modern styles and trends. In Ferrara, the center of avant-garde activity, he doubtless heard the madrigals being composed for the d'Este court. However, his own style remained conservative and became simpler and more refined as he aged. In the 1590s his health began to decline, and he went to a doctor named Thomas Mermann for treatment of what was called "melancholia hypocondriaca", but he was still able to compose as well as travel occasionally. His final work was often considered one of his best pieces: an exquisite set of twenty-one madrigali spirituali known as the Lagrime di San Pietro ("Tears of St. Peter"), which he dedicated to Pope Clement VIII, and which was published posthumously in 1595. Lasso died in Munich on 14 June 1594, the same day that his employer decided to dismiss him for economic reasons. He never saw the letter. He was buried in Munich in the Alter Franziskaner Friedhof, a cemetery that was cleared of gravestones in 1789 and is now the site of Max-Joseph-Platz.

== Music and influence ==
Resonet in laudibus

Hodie Completi Sunt

One of the most prolific, versatile, and universal composers of the late Renaissance, Lasso wrote over 2,000 works in all Latin, French, Italian and German vocal genres known in his time. These include 530 motets, 175 Italian madrigals and villanellas, 150 French chansons, and 90 German lieder. No strictly instrumental music by Lasso is known to survive, or ever to have existed: an interesting omission for a composer otherwise so wide-ranging and prolific, during an age when instrumental music was becoming an ever-more prominent means of expression, all over Europe. The German music publisher Adam Berg dedicated 5 volumes of his Patrocinium musicum (published from 1573–1580) to Lasso's music.

=== Sacred music ===
Lasso remained Catholic during this age of religious discord, though this neither hindered him in writing worldly secular songs nor in employing music originally to racy texts in his Magnificats and masses employing parody technique. Nevertheless, the Catholic Counter-Reformation, which under Jesuit influence was reaching a peak in Bavaria in the late sixteenth century, had a demonstrable impact on Lasso's late work, including the liturgical music for the Roman Rite, the burgeoning number of Magnificats, the settings of the Catholic Ulenberg Psalter (1588), and especially the great penitential cycle of spiritual madrigals, the Lagrime di San Pietro (1594).

==== Masses ====
Almost 60 masses have survived complete; most of them are parody masses using as melodic source material secular works written by himself or other composers. Technically impressive, they are nevertheless the most conservative part of his output. He usually conformed the style of the mass to the style of the source material, which ranged from Gregorian chant to contemporary madrigals, but always maintained an expressive and reverent character in the final product.

Several of his masses are based on extremely secular French chansons; some of the source materials were outright obscene. Entre vous filles de quinze ans, "Oh you fifteen-year old girls", by Jacob Clemens non Papa, gave him source material for his 1581 Missa entre vous filles, probably the most scandalous of the lot. This practice was not only accepted but encouraged by his employer, which can be confirmed by evidence from their correspondence, much of which has survived.

In addition to his traditional imitation masses, he wrote a considerable quantity of missae breves, "brief masses", syllabic short masses meant for brief services (for example, on days when Duke Albrecht went hunting: evidently he did not want to be detained by long-winded polyphonic music). The most extreme of these is a work actually known as the Jäger Mass (Missa venatorum)—the "Hunter's Mass".

Some of his masses show influence from the Venetian School, particularly in their use of polychoral techniques (for example, in the eight-voice Missa osculetur me, based on his own motet). Three of his masses are for double choir, and they may have been influential on the Venetians themselves; after all, Andrea Gabrieli visited Lasso in Munich in 1562, and many of Lasso's works were published in Venice. Even though Lasso used the contemporary, sonorous Venetian style, his harmonic language remained conservative in these works: he adapted the texture of the Venetians to his own artistic ends.

==== Motets and other sacred music ====
Lasso is one of the composers of a style known as musica reservata—a term which has survived in many contemporary references, many of them seemingly contradictory. The exact meaning of the term is a matter of fierce debate, though a rough consensus among musicologists is that it involves intensely expressive setting of text and chromaticism, and that it may have referred to music specifically written for connoisseurs. A famous composition by Lasso representative of this style is his series of 12 motets entitled Prophetiae Sibyllarum, in a wildly chromatic idiom which anticipates the work of Gesualdo; some of the chord progressions in this piece were not to be heard again until the 20th century.

Lasso wrote four settings of the Passion, one for each of the Evangelists, St. Matthew, Mark, Luke and John. All are for a cappella voices. He sets the words of Christ and the narration of the Evangelist as chant, while setting the passages for groups polyphonically.

As a composer of motets, Lasso was one of the most diverse and prodigious of the entire Renaissance. His output varies from the sublime to the ridiculous, and he showed a sense of humor not often associated with sacred music: for example, one of his motets satirizes poor singers (his setting of Super flumina Babylonis, for five voices) which includes stuttering, stopping and starting, and general confusion; it is related in concept if not in style to Mozart's A Musical Joke. Many of his motets were composed for ceremonial occasions, as could be expected of a court composer who was required to provide music for visits of dignitaries, weddings, treaties and other events of state. But it was as a composer of religious motets that Lasso achieved his widest and most lasting fame.

Lasso's 1584 setting of the seven Penitential Psalms of David (Psalmi Davidis poenitentiales), ordered by King Charles IX of France, is one of the most famous collections of psalm settings of the entire Renaissance. According to George T. Ferris, it was claimed by some that he ordered them as an expiation of his soul after the massacre of St. Bartholomew of the Huguenots. The counterpoint is free, avoiding the pervasive imitation of the Netherlanders such as Gombert, and occasionally using expressive devices foreign to Palestrina. As elsewhere, Lasso strives for emotional impact, and uses a variety of texture and care in text-setting towards that end. The penultimate piece in the collection, his setting of the De profundis (Psalm 129/130), is considered by many scholars to be one of the high-water marks of Renaissance polyphony, ranking alongside the two settings of the same text by Josquin des Prez.

Among his other liturgical compositions are hymns, canticles (including over 100 Magnificats), responsories for Holy Week, Passions, Lamentations, and some independent pieces for major feasts.

=== Secular music ===
Lasso wrote in all the prominent secular forms of the time. In the preface to his collection of German songs, Lasso lists his secular works: Italian madrigals and French chansons, German and Dutch songs. He is probably the only Renaissance composer to write prolifically in five languages – Latin in addition to those mentioned above – and he wrote with equal fluency in each. Many of his songs became hugely popular, circulating widely in Europe. In these various secular songs, he conforms to the manner of the country of origin while still showing his characteristic originality, wit, and terseness of statement.

==== Madrigals ====
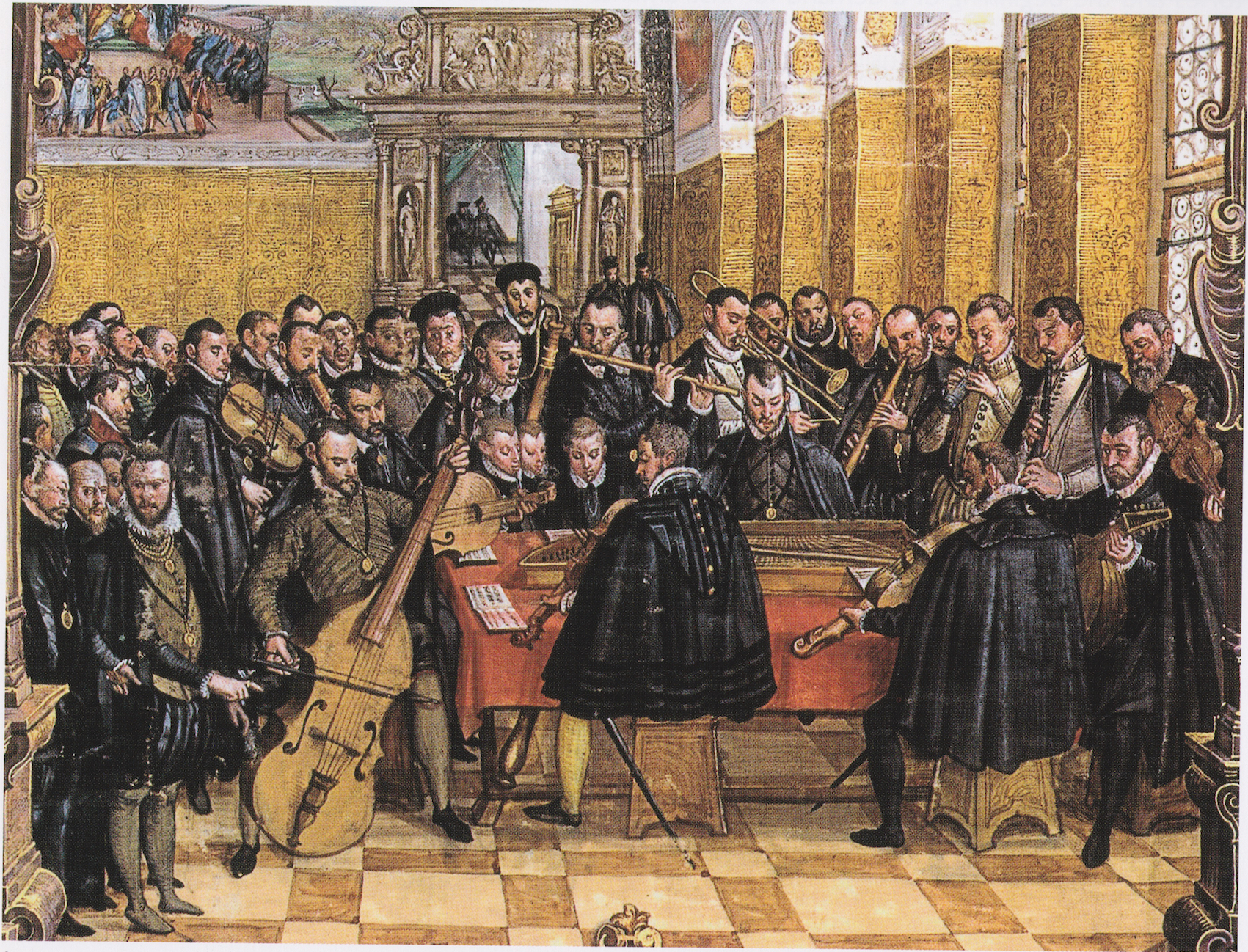
Lasso leading the Munich Court Chapel, detail of painting by Hans Mielich

In his madrigals, many of which he wrote during his stay in Rome, his style is clear and concise, and he wrote tunes which were easily memorable; he also "signed" his work by frequently using the word 'lasso' (and often setting with the solfège syllables la-sol, i.e. A-G in the key of C). His choice of poetry varied widely, from Petrarch for his more serious work to the lightest verse for some of his amusing canzonettas.

Lasso often preferred cyclic madrigals, i.e. settings of multiple poems in a group as a set of related pieces of music. For example, his fourth book of madrigals for five voices begins with a complete sestina by Petrarch, continues with two-part sonnets, and concludes with another sestina: therefore the entire book can be heard as a unified composition with each madrigal a subsidiary part.

==== Chansons ====
Another form which Lasso cultivated was the French chanson, of which he wrote about 150. Most of them date from the 1550s, but he continued to write them even when he was in Germany: his last productions in this genre come from the 1580s. They were enormously popular in Europe, and of all his works, they were the most widely arranged for instruments such as lute and keyboard. Most were collected in the 1570s and 1580s in three publications: one by Petrus Phalesius the Elder in 1571, and two by Le Roy and Ballard in 1576 and 1584. Stylistically, they ranged from the dignified and serious, to playful, bawdy, and amorous compositions, as well as drinking songs suited to taverns. Lasso followed the polished, lyrical style of Sermisy rather than the programmatic style of Clément Janequin for his writing.

One of the most famous of Lasso's drinking songs was used by Shakespeare in Henry IV, Part II. English words are fitted to Un jour vis un foulon qui fouloit (as Monsieur Mingo) and sung by the drunken Justice Silence, in Act V, Scene iii.

==== German lieder ====
A third type of secular composition by Lasso was the German Lied. Most of these he evidently intended for a different audience, since they are considerably different in tone and style from either the chansons or madrigals; in addition, he wrote them later in life, with none appearing until 1567, when he was already well-established at Munich. Many are on religious subjects, although light and comic verse is represented as well. He also wrote drinking songs in German, and contrasting with his parallel work in the genre of the chanson, he also wrote songs on the unfortunate aspects of overindulgence.

==== Dutch songs ====
In the preface to his collection of German songs, Lasso states that he had composed Dutch songs. However, no Dutch song has been preserved.

== Sources and further reading ==
- Haar, James, "Orlande de Lassus", in The New Grove Dictionary of Music and Musicians, ed. Stanley Sadie. 20 vol. London, Macmillan Publishers Ltd., 1980. ISBN 1-56159-174-2
- Haar, James. L. Macy (ed.). Orlande de Lassus. Grove Music Online. Archived from the original on 13 January 2011.(subscription required)
- Gustave Reese, Music in the Renaissance. New York, W.W. Norton & Co., 1954. ISBN 0-393-09530-4
- Harold Gleason and Warren Becker, Music in the Middle Ages and Renaissance (Music Literature Outlines Series I). Bloomington, Indiana. Frangipani Press, 1986. ISBN 0-89917-034-X
- Jean-Paul C. Montagnier, The Polyphonic Mass in France, 1600-1780: The Evidence of the Printed Choirbooks, Cambridge: Cambridge University Press, 2017 (Chapter 5, "Lassus as Model").
