= Anna Maria Sessi =

Italian opera singer

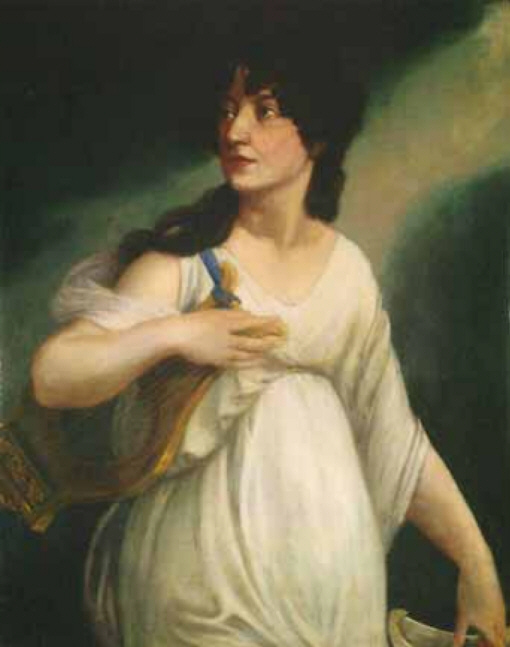
- Born: 1790; Rome, Papal States
- Died: 3 June 1864; Vienna. Austrian Empire
- Other names: Anna Maria Neumann-Sessi; Anna Maria Neumann
- Occupation: Opera singer (soprano)

Anna Maria Sessi, later known as Anna Maria Neumann-Sessi, (1790 – 3 June 1864) was an Italian-born soprano primarily active in the opera houses of Vienna and Leipzig.

== Life and career ==
Sessi was born in Rome, the daughter of Giovanni Sessi, himself an opera singer, who moved to Vienna with his family in 1793. She was the second youngest of his five daughters, all of whom became opera singers. Anna Maria was trained in singing by her elder sisters Marianne (177?–1847) and Imperatrice (1784–1808) and made her stage debut at the Imperial Court Theater in Vienna in 1805.

During the early years of her career, Sessi sang in Italy, mainly in Bologna, Florence, and Naples, often appearing with her sister Imperatrice. She continued to appear in Italy after Imperatrice's death in 1808, but in 1811 returned to Vienna. In 1813, she married the Austrian businessman Ignaz Neumann, after which she performed as Anna Maria Neumann-Sessi. Sessi sang frequently at the Imperial Court Theater from 1811 until 1815.

After a concert tour to various cities in Germany and Hungary, she established herself in Leipzig, where she sang from 1817 in concerts and in operas at the Altes Theater. In 1821, she sang the role of Agathe in the theatre's first performance of Weber's Der Freischütz. Other roles for which she was particularly known during her career included Julia in Spontini's La vestale, Amenaide in Rossini's Tancredi, Donna Anna in Mozart's Don Giovanni and the Countess in his Marriage of Figaro.

Sessi retired from the stage in 1823 after a serious illness caused her to lose her voice. For a time after her retirement, she taught singing in Hamburg and then returned to Vienna, where she spent her later years. She died there at the age of 74.
