= Annibale Stabile =

Italian composer

Annibale Stabile (c.1535 – April 1595) was an Italian composer of the Renaissance. He was a member of the Roman School of composition, and probably was a pupil of Palestrina. He was active mainly at Rome but moved briefly to Kraków, Poland at the end of his life.

== Life ==
Records of his early life are inexact, but he was probably born in Naples, and was likely a boy singer at St. John Lateran in 1544 and 1545. An "Annibale contralto" is also listed at the same church in 1555 and 1556; since it is unlikely that a twenty-year-old would have been listed as a contralto, this may have been a different person; alternatively it has been proposed that Annibale was born in the mid-1540s. Stabile himself mentioned that he studied with Palestrina, who was maestro di cappella at St. John Lateran in 1555 and 1556.

Stabile became maestro di cappella at St. John Lateran in 1575, and retained that position until 1578, at which time he moved on to a similar position at the Collegio Germanico. Since Giovanni Dragoni also held the position of maestro di cappella at St. John Lateran, beginning in 1576, the two must have shared the post for two years. In 1582 Stabile was ordained a priest; and in 1590 he changed jobs again, this time becoming maestro di cappella at Santa Maria Maggiore, where he was employed from 1591 to 1594. He went to Poland in early 1595, serving King Sigismund III Vasa, who frequently employed Italian musicians, but Stabile died after being in Kraków only two months. The cause of his death is not indicated, but the journey to Poland was not without risk; the renowned madrigal composer Luca Marenzio also died after a trip to Poland (1599), which he claimed ruined his health.

== Music ==
Stabile wrote masses, motets, litanies, hymns, and other sacred pieces, in nine separate publications. Two of his collections of masses were first published in Warsaw in 1979, as Msze królewskie (Royal Masses), which he wrote for his employer Sigismund III. One of his masses — the Missa cantantibus organis — is for the unusual combination of 12 independent voices, and was a collaboration with Palestrina and others. Only the Kyrie, Credo and Crucifixus survive from this work.

Stabile's style was similar to that of Palestrina, especially in his vocal music; although he normally wrote music somewhat less contrapuntally complex than that of his teacher, he occasionally indulged in canon, especially in his motets. His secular music, mainly madrigals, were often light in character, an unusual feature for a member of the Roman School, whose music was most often noted for its reverence, if not severity.

He published three books of madrigals. The second of the three he wrote in collaboration with Giovanni Maria Nanino (1581). All three of these collections were published in Venice, a friendlier environment for publication of light secular music, and the most active center of music publishing in Italy in the late 16th century.

== References and further reading ==
- Ruth I. DeFord: "Annibale Stabile", Grove Music Online, ed. L. Macy (Accessed March 12, 2006), (subscription access)
- Gustave Reese, Music in the Renaissance. New York, W.W. Norton & Co., 1954. ISBN 0-393-09530-4
