= Madrigale spirituale =

A madrigale spirituale (Italian; pl. madrigali spirituali) is a madrigal, or madrigal-like piece of music, with a sacred rather than a secular text. Most examples of the form date from the late Renaissance and early Baroque eras, and principally come from Italy and Germany.

Madrigali spirituali were almost always intended for an audience of cultivated, often aristocratic amateurs. They were performed at private houses, academies, and courts of noblemen in Italy and adjacent countries, but almost certainly were not used liturgically. The madrigale spirituale was an a cappella form, though instrumental accompaniment was used on occasion, especially after 1600.

During the Counter-Reformation, there was, to some degree, a reaction against the secularization of the art of music in Italy, Spain and the southern (Catholic) portion of Germany. While that did not stop the composition of secular music (indeed, the explosion of forms and styles of secular music continued unabated), many composers began to adapt the most advanced secular compositional forms to religious usage. On occasion, existing madrigals were merely fitted with a religious text, usually in Latin, without any other change (such adaptations are called "contrafacta"). However, some of the madrigali spirituali reached heights of expressive and emotional intensity at least equal to that of the finest madrigalists in their secular compositions.

The form was probably encouraged by the Jesuits; some collections were dedicated to them, especially in the 1570s and 1580s.

Some famous examples of madrigali spirituali include Lassus's sublimely beautiful Lagrime di San Pietro (Munich, 1595); Guillaume Dufay's Vergine bella, (ca. 1470) setting a poem in praise of the Blessed Virgin Mary by Petrarch; Giovanni Pierluigi da Palestrina's First Book of Madrigals (1581), also setting Marian poems by Petrarch; Carlo Gesualdo's Tenebrae Responsories (1611); and the huge collection by Giovanni Francesco Anerio, Teatro armonico spirituale (Rome, 1619).

== See also ==
- Motet
