= Prophetiae Sibyllarum =

Series of twelve motets by the Franco-Flemish composer Orlando di Lasso

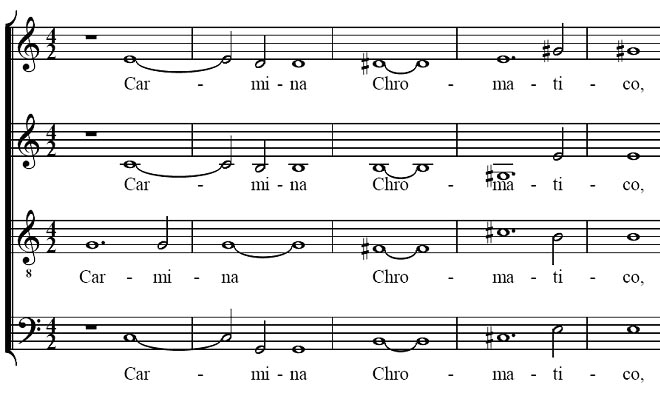
Opening of the introduction

Prophetiae Sibyllarum ("Sibylline Prophecies" or "Sibylline Oracles") are a series of twelve motets by the Franco-Flemish composer Orlando di Lasso. The works are known for their extremely chromatic idiom.

== History ==
This cycle of motets is said to have been given as a personal gift to Albrecht V. of Bavaria, Lasso's employer, after his arrival in Munich. By the time he had begun work in Germany, Lasso had already enjoyed great success in Italy as a composer for Costantino Castrioto, and was looking to make a new name for himself. The motets were first published in 1600, after Lasso's death in 1594, by his son Rudolph. There remains, however, a small amount of disagreement over the dates of the original manuscript. Boetticher suggests the date to be around 1550–52, during Lasso's time in Naples, while Alfred Einstein prefers a date between 1555 and 1560, by which time Lasso could have seen depictions of the sibyls in places like the Sistine Chapel in Rome, and in the Borgia Apartments of the Vatican.

== Analyses ==
Crook (1998) claims that the introduction, "Carmina Chromatico", has become, "probably the most analyzed piece of Renaissance music by any composer in any genre," since Lowinsky's 1961 discussion of the prelude's "triadic atonality". This can be understood by studying the Prologue to the cycle. The texture remains triadic, typical of the polyphony of that time, but modulates so often that the listener quickly loses the original tonal center. Lowinsky's discussion has led to other quandaries on the topic of the tonal coherence of the prologue. William J. Mitchell, takes issue with Lowinsky's conclusion and suggests that "perhaps the erosion of any stable tonal center is less the fault of Lasso, who seems to have made a splendid effort, than of the analysis which is indeed atonal." These debates are ultimately built on the question of theorists' license to analyze the piece through our modern lens of tonality and atonality.

== Poems ==
The Prophetiae Sibyllarum text is made up of one three-line prologue and twelve six-line motets. All of the poems are in dactylic hexameter. The prophecies, each told by a different prophetess, tell of the coming of Christ. Given the Renaissance's fascination with mysticism and antiquity it is no surprise that Lasso would choose these prophecies as his text. The extremely chromatic setting of this text points toward Lasso's interactions with Cipriano de Rore and Nicola Vicentino, both known for their experiments with chromaticism, during his time at St. John Lateran. Lowinsky also speculates that "rendering the Sibylline prophecies in chromatic style, the young genius probably implied that chromaticism was the music of the future."

Prologue

Carmina chromatico quae audis modulata tenore,
Haec sunt illa quibus nostrae olim arcana salutis
Bis senae intrepido cecinerunt ore Sibyllae.

Polyphonic songs which you hear with a chromatic tenor,
these are they, in which our twice-six sibyls once
sang with fearless mouth the secrets of salvation.

I. Sibylla Persica

Virgine matre satus, pando residebit asello
Iucundus princeps, unus qui ferre salutem
Rite queat lapsis; tamen illis forte diebus
Multi multa ferent, immensi facta laboris.
Solo sed satis est oracula prodere verbo:
Ille Deus casta nascetur virgine magnus.

The son of a virgin mother shall sit on a crook-backed ass,
the joyful prince, the only one who can rightly bring
salvation to the fallen; but it will happen in those days that
many shall tell many prophecies of great labor.
But it is enough for the oracles to bring forth with a single word:
That great God shall be born of a chaste virgin.

II. Sibylla Libyca

Ecce dies venient, quo aeternus tempore princeps,
Irradians sata laeta, viris sua crimina tollet,
Lumine clarescet cuius synagoga recenti:
Sordida qui solus reserabit labra reorum,
Aequus erit cunctis, gremio rex membra reclinet
Reginae mundi, sanctus, per saecula vivus.

Behold the days will come, at which time the immortal prince,
sowing abundant crops, shall take away their crimes from men,
whose synagogue will shine with new light;
he alone shall open the soiled lips of the accused,
he shall be just to all; let the king, holy, living for all ages,
recline his limbs in the bosom of the queen of the world.

III. Sibylla Delphica

Non tarde veniet, tacita sed mente tenendum
Hoc opus; hoc memori semper qui corde reponet,
Huius pertentant cur gaudia magna prophetae
Eximii, qui virginea conceptus ab alvo
Prodibit, sine contactu maris, omnia vincit
Hoc naturae opera: at fecit, qui cuncta gubernat

He shall not come slowly (but this work must be held with
quiet thought), he who will ever store this in a mindful heart,
why his prophets may announce great joys of this
exalted one, who shall come forth conceived from the
virginal womb without taint of man. This conquers all
the works of nature: yet he has done this who governs all things.

IV. Sibylla Cimmeria

In teneris annis facie praesignis, honore
Militiae aeternae regem sacra virgo cibabit
Lacte suo; per quem gaudebunt pectore summo
Omnia, et Eoo lucebit sidus ab orbe
Mirificum; sua dona Magi cum laude ferentes,
Obiicient puero myrrham, aurum, thura Sabaea.

In her tender years, distinguished with beauty, in honor
the holy virgin will feed the king of the eternal host
with her milk; through whom all things will rejoice
with uplifted heart, and in the east will shine
a marvelous star: Magi bringing their gifts with praise
shall present to the child myrrh, gold, Sabaean frankincense.

V. Sibylla Samia

Ecce dies, nigras quae tollet laeta tenebras,
Mox veniet, solvens nodosa volumina vatum
Gentis Judaeae, referent ut carmina plebis.
Hunc poterent clarum vivorum tangere regem,
Humano quem virgo sinu inviolata fovebit.
Annuit hoc coelum, rutilantia sidera monstrant.

Behold, the joyful day which shall lift the black darkness
will soon come and unravel the knotty writings of the prophets
of the Judean tribe, as the people's songs tell.
They shall be able to touch this glorious ruler of the living,
whom an unstained virgin will nurture at a human breast.
This the heavens promise, this the glowing stars show.

VI. Sibylla Cumana

Iam mea certa manent, et vera, novissima verba
Ultima venturi quod erant oracula regis,
Qui toti veniens mundo cum pace, placebit,
Ut voluit, nostra vestitus carne decenter,
In cunctis humilis, castam pro matre puellam
Deliget, haec alias forma praecesserit omnes.

Now my most recent words shall remain certain and true,
because they were the last oracles of the king to come,
Who, coming for the whole world with peace, shall be pleased,
as he intended, to be clothed fitly in our flesh,
humble in all things. He shall choose a chaste maiden for his
mother; she shall exceed all others in beauty.

VII. Sibylla Hellaspontica

Dum meditor quondam vidi decorare puellam,
Eximio, castam quod se servaret, honore,
Munera digna suo, et divino numine visa,
Quae sobolem multo pareret splendore micantem:
Progenies summi, speciosa et vera Tonantis,
Pacifica mundum qui sub ditione gubernet.

Once while I was reflecting, I saw him adorn a maiden
with great honor (because she kept herself chaste);
She seemed worthy through his gift and divine authority
to give birth to a glorious offspring with great splendor:
the beautiful and true child of the highest Thunderer,
who would rule the world with peaceful authority.

VIII. Sibylla Phrygia

Ipsa Deum vidi summum, punire volentem
Mundi homines stupidos, et pectora caeca, rebellis.
Et quia sic nostram complerent crimina pellem,
Virginis in corpus voluit demittere coelo
Ipse Deus prolem, quam nunciet angelus almae
Matri, quo miseros contracta sorde lavaret.

I myself saw the high God wishing to punish
the stupid men of the earth and the blind heart of the rebel.
And because crimes shall thus fill our skin,
God himself wished to send from heaven into the body
of a virgin his son, which the angel shall announce to the fostering
mother, so that he may raise the wretches from the uncleanness they have
contracted.

IX. Sibylla Europaea

Virginis aeternum veniet de corpore verbum
Purum, qui valles et montes transiet altos.
Ille volens etiam stellato missus Olympo,
Edetur mundo pauper, qui cuncta silenti
Rexerit imperio. Sic credo, et mente fatebor:
Humano simul ac divino semine natus.

From the body of a virgin shall come forth the pure
word eternal, who shall cross valleys and high mountains.
He, willingly sent even from starry Olympus,
will be sent into the world a pauper, who shall rule all creation
with silent power. Thus I believe and shall acknowledge in my heart:
He is the child of both divine and human seed.

X. Sibylla Tiburtina

Verax ipse Deus dedit haec mihi munia fandi,
Carmine quod sanctam potui monstrare puellam,
Concipiet quae Nazareis in finibus, illum,
Quem sub carne Deum Bethlemica rura videbunt.
O nimium felix, coelo dignissima mater,
Quae tantam sacro lactabit ab ubere prolem.

The truthful God himself gave me these gifts of prophecy,
that I might proclaim in song the holy virgin
who shall conceive in Nazareth's bounds
that God whom Bethlehem's lands shall see in the flesh.
O most happy mother, worthy of Heaven,
who shall nurse such a child from her holy breast.

XI. Sibylla Erythraea

Cerno Dei natum, qui se dimisit ab alto,
Ultima felices referent cum tempora soles
Hebraea quem virgo feret de stirpe decora,
In terris multum teneris passurus ab annis,
Magnus erit tamen hic divino carmine vates,
Virgine matre satus, prudenti pectore verax.

I behold the son of God, who sent himself from on high,
when the joyful days shall bring the last times.
He whom the comely virgin shall bear from the Hebrew lineage,
he who shall suffer much on earth from his tender years on,
he shall nevertheless be here a great seer in godly prophecy,
the son of a virgin mother, truthful and of a wise heart.

XII. Sibylla Agrippa

Summus erit sub carne satus, charissimus atque,
Virginis et verae complebit viscera sanctum
Verbum, consilio, sine noxa, spiritus almi.
Despectus multis tamen ille, salutis amore,
Arguet et nostra commissa piacula culpa.
Cuius honos constans, et gloria certa manebit.

The highest and dearest shall be born in the flesh the son
of the true virgin, and the holy word shall fill the womb
of the maiden through the pure intention of the nurturing spirit;
although contemptible to many, he, for love of our salvation,
will censure the sins committed by our guilt;
his honor shall remain constant and his glory certain.

== See also ==
- Prophetiae Sibyllarum (Waterhouse)
