= Francesco Soriano =

Italian composer (1548/49–1621)

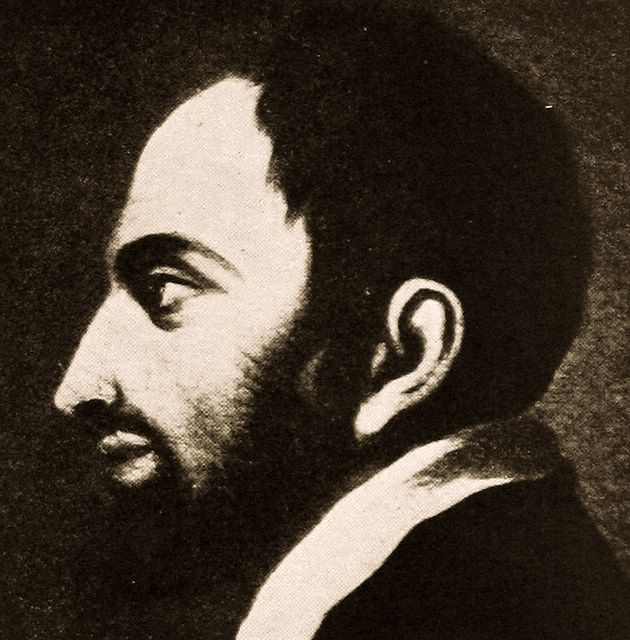
Francesco Soriano

Francesco Soriano (1548 or 1549, in Soriano nel Cimino – 19 July 1621, in Rome) was an Italian composer of the Renaissance. He was one of the most skilled members of the Roman School in the first generation after Palestrina.

Soriano was born in Soriano, near Viterbo. He studied at the Basilica di San Giovanni in Laterano in Rome with several people including Palestrina, and became a priest in the 1570s. By 1580 he was maestro di cappella at S. Luigi dei Francesi, also in Rome. In 1581 he moved to Mantua, taking a position at the Gonzaga court there; but in 1586 he moved back to Rome where he spent the rest of his life working as choirmaster at three separate churches, including the Cappella Giulia at St. Peter's. He retired in 1620.

Soriano worked with Felice Anerio to revise the Roman Gradual in accordance with the needs of the Counter-Reformation; this work was left incomplete by Palestrina.

Stylistically, Soriano's music is much like Palestrina's, but shows some influence from the progressive trends prevalent around the turn of the century. He adopted the polychoral style, while retaining the smooth polyphonic treatment of Palestrina, and he had a liking for homophonic textures, which generally made it easier to understand the sung text.

He wrote masses, motets (some for eight voices), psalms (one collection, published in Venice in 1616, is for 12 voices and basso continuo), settings of the Passion according to each of the four gospels (Matthew, Mark, Luke, and John), Marian antiphons, and several books of madrigals. His Passion settings are significant predecessors of the more famous settings from the Baroque era, for instance, those by J.S. Bach; they are set in a restrained but dramatic style, with some attempt at characterization. In some ways they are a predecessor of the oratorio, mixing solo voice, chorus, and non-acted character roles, but in a style more related to Palestrina than to anything Baroque.
