= Leonardo Cozzando =

Italian writer (1620–1702)

- Born: 1620; Rovato, Republic of Venice
- Died: 7 February 1702 (aged 81–82); Rovato, Republic of Venice
- Occupation: Writer

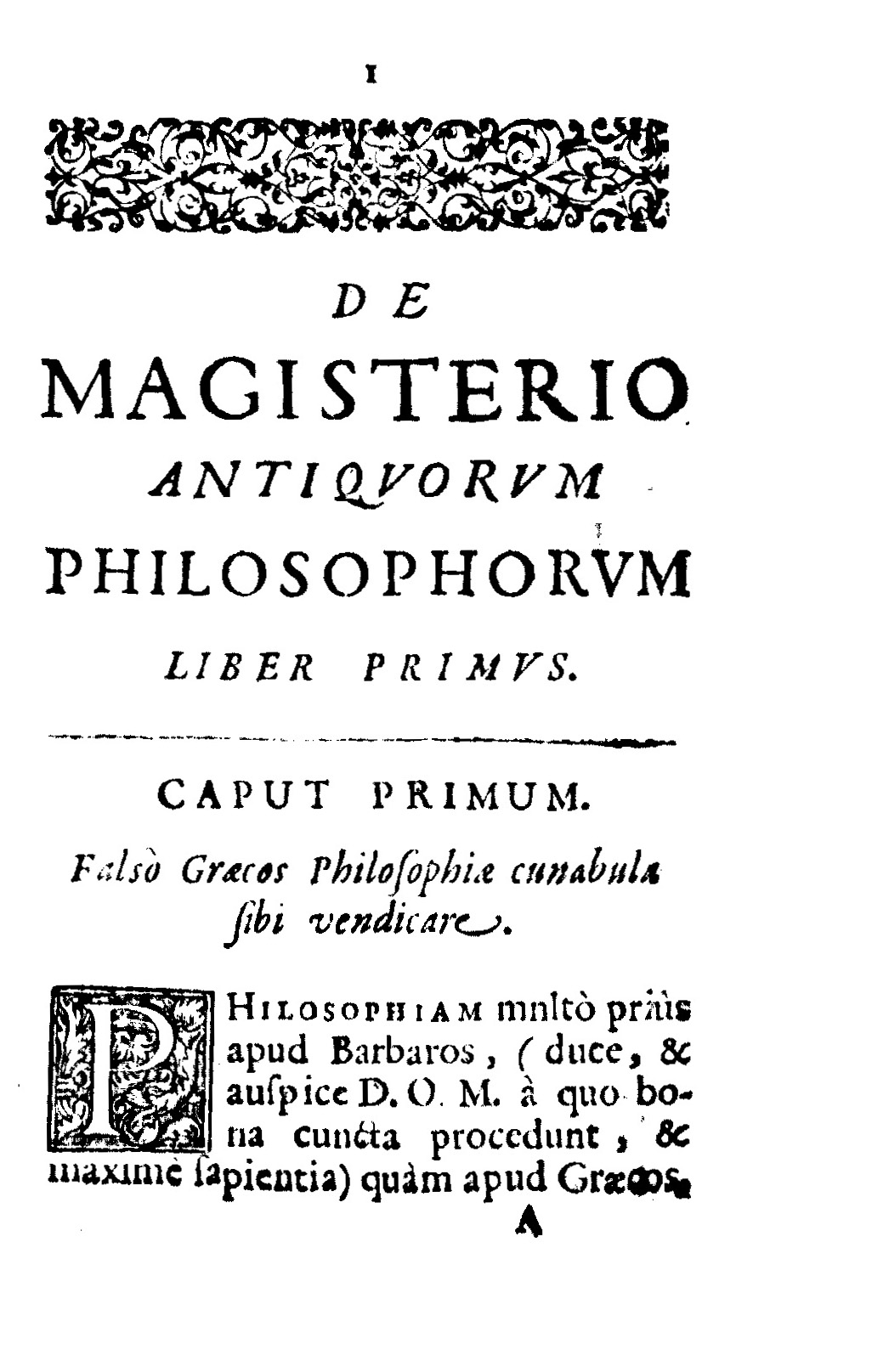
De magisterio antiquorum philosophorum, Book I (1684)

Leonardo Cozzando (1620 – 1702) was an Italian writer.

When he was 12, he joined the Servite Order; in 1690 he became Provincial of the Order. He wrote and published a number of erudite works on various subjects. His most relevant work was the Libraria bresciana, published in 1694.

== Works ==
- De magisterio antiquorum philosophorum (in Latin). Geneva: Samuel de Tournes. 1684.
- Della libraria bresciana, nuovamente aperta (in Italian). Vol. 1. Brescia: Gio. Maria Rizzardi. 1685.
- Libraria bresciana (in Italian). Brescia: Gio. Maria Rizzardi. 1694.
- Vago, e curioso ristretto profano, e sagro dell'historia bresciana (in Italian). Brescia: Gio. Maria Rizzardi. 1694.
