= Canzonetta =

Popular Italian secular vocal composition that originated around 1560

In music, a canzonetta (Italian pronunciation: [kantsoˈnetta]; pl. canzonette, canzonetti or canzonettas) is a popular Italian secular vocal composition that originated around 1560. Earlier versions were somewhat like a madrigal but lighter in style—but by the 18th century, especially as it moved outside of Italy, the term came to mean a song for voice and accompaniment, usually in a light secular style.

== Origins in Italy ==
In its earliest form, the canzonetta was closely related to a popular Neapolitan form, the villanella. The songs were always secular, and generally involved pastoral, irreverent, or erotic subjects. The rhyme and stanza schemes of the poems varied but always included a final "punch line." Typically the early canzonetta was for three unaccompanied voices, moved quickly, and shunned contrapuntal complexity, though it often involved animated cross-rhythms. It was fun to sing, hugely popular, and quickly caught on throughout Italy, paralleling the madrigal, with which it later began to interact. The earliest books of canzonettas were published by Giovanni Ferretti in 1567 and Girolamo Conversi in 1572.

By the 1580s some of the major composers of secular music in Italy were writing canzonettas, including Luca Marenzio and Claudio Monteverdi, who published his first set in 1584. Monteverdi was to return to the form with his ninth and final book of madrigals (published posthumously in 1651). Orazio Vecchi was another important composer of canzonettas in the 1580s. His canzonettas varied widely, and included some for dancing and some that parodied the excesses of the contemporary madrigal. Some composers, such as Roman School member Felice Anerio, adapted the form for a sacred purpose. Anerio wrote a set of sacred canzonette.

By the end of the century most canzonettas were for four to six voices, and had become more similar to the madrigal. Some composers who studied in Italy carried the canzonetta back to their home countries, such as Hans Leo Hassler, who brought the form to Germany.

== England ==
When the madrigal was imported into England in the late 16th century, the term canzonetta went along with it, anglicized to canzonet. Many compositions of the English Madrigal School were entitled canzonets, and although Thomas Morley referred to it specifically as a lighter form of madrigal in his writings, canzonets in England are almost indistinguishable from madrigals: they are longer than Italian canzonettas, more complex, and more contrapuntal.

== Later developments ==
During the 17th century, composers continued to produce canzonettas, but the form gradually changed from a madrigalian, a cappella genre to something more akin to a monody, or even a cantata. Eventually, the canzonetta became a type of song for solo voice and accompaniment. A late example of the form can be seen in the two sets of six by Joseph Haydn for voice and piano, on English texts (1794-5).

Sometimes the term canzonetta is used by composers to denote a songlike instrumental piece. A famous example is the slow movement of the Tchaikovsky Violin Concerto. A more modern example is the Canzonetta for Oboe and String Orchestra (1979/1981) by Samuel Barber.

The term has also been applied since the 17th century to mean "little canzona" and has been used by such composers as Dieterich Buxtehude to apply to smaller canzona-type keyboard works (often, like the canzona, in fugue form and style). A good example of this is the Canzonetta in A minor, BuxWV 225.

== Representative composers ==
Composers of canzonettas include:

- Claudio Monteverdi
- Lodovico Grossi da Viadana
- Felice Anerio
- Adriano Banchieri
- Luca Marenzio
- Pietro Cerone
- Orazio Vecchi
- Giovanni Artusi
- Marianne Sessi
- Hans Leo Hassler
- Giovanni Maria Nanino
- Francesca Caccini
- Salamone Rossi
- Dieterich Buxtehude
- Joseph Haydn

== Popular Song ==
- In 1871 George Cooper and J. R. Thomas wrote a Canzonet called "Dreaming, Still Dreaming" for Mrs. Zelda Sequin of the Parepa Opera Troupe.
- In 1876 Septimus Winner wrote a Canzonetta called Gay As a Lark which also featured a Tarantella.

== References and further reading ==
- Article "Canzonetta," in The New Grove Dictionary of Music and Musicians, ed. Stanley Sadie. 20 vol. London, Macmillan Publishers Ltd., 1980. ISBN 1-56159-174-2
- Gustave Reese, Music in the Renaissance. New York, W.W. Norton & Co., 1954. ISBN 0-393-09530-4
- The New Harvard Dictionary of Music, ed. Don Randel. Cambridge, Massachusetts, Harvard University Press, 1986. ISBN 0-674-61525-5
