= Luca Marenzio =

Italian composer (1553/54 – 1599)

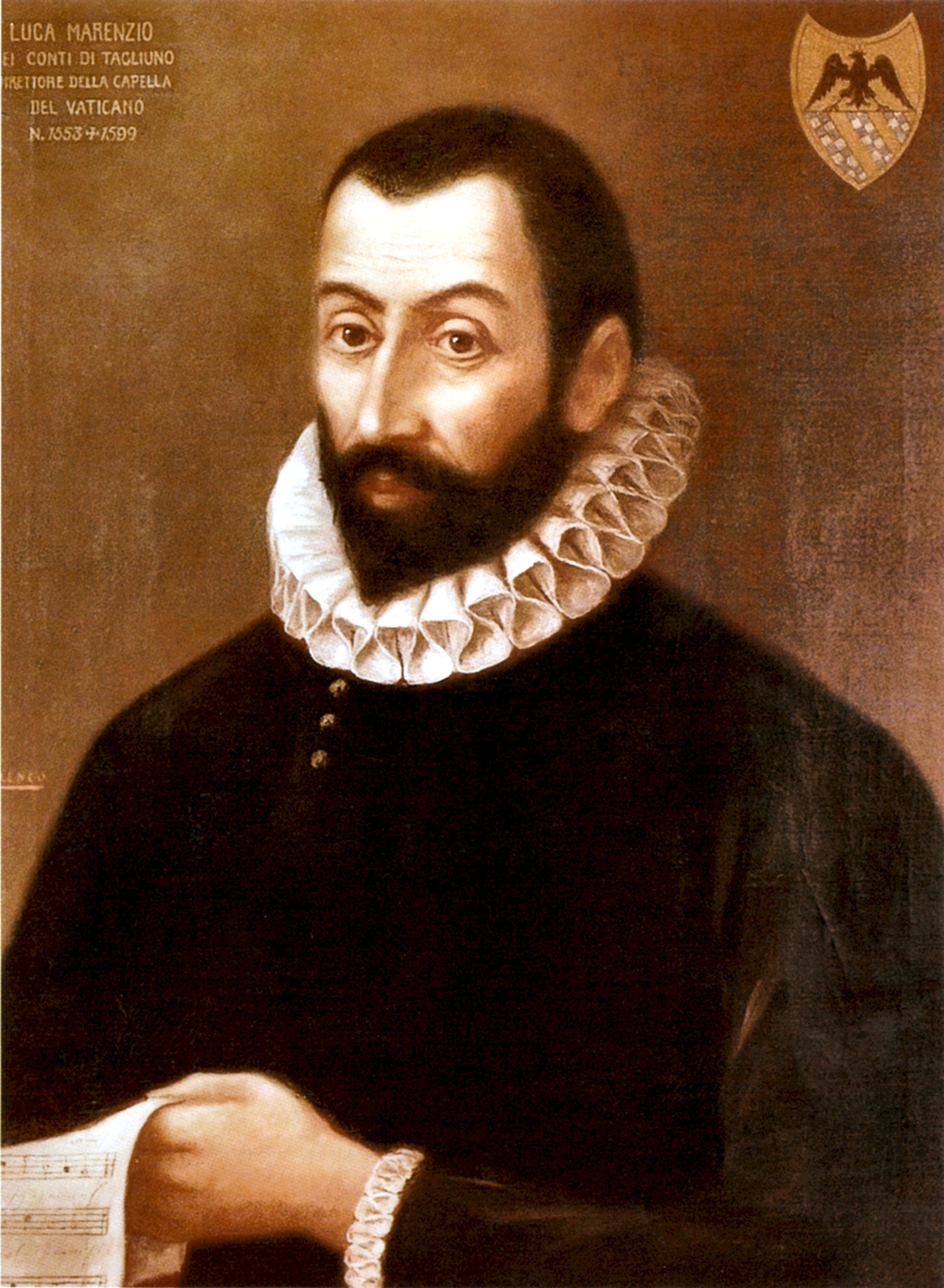
Luca Marenzio

Luca Marenzio (also Marentio; October 18, 1553 or 1554 – August 22, 1599) was an Italian composer and singer of the late Renaissance.

He was one of the most renowned composers of madrigals, and wrote some of the most famous examples of the form in its late stage of development, prior to its early Baroque transformation by Monteverdi. In all, Marenzio wrote around 500 madrigals, ranging from the lightest to the most serious styles, packed with word-painting, chromaticism, and other characteristics of the late madrigal style. Marenzio was influential as far away as England, where his earlier, lighter work appeared in 1588 in the Musica Transalpina, the collection that initiated the madrigal craze in that country.

Marenzio worked in the service of several aristocratic Italian families, including the Gonzaga, Este, and Medici, and spent most of his career in Rome.

== Early years ==
According to biographer Leonardo Cozzando, writing in the late 17th century, Marenzio was born at Coccaglio, a small town near Brescia, as one of seven children to a poor family. His father was a notary clerk in Brescia. A birthdate of October 18, 1553 has been proposed, based his father's stating in 1588 that his son was 35, and a suggestion that he may have been named after St. Luke, whose feast day is on October 18.

== Early career ==
He may have had some early musical training under Giovanni Contino, who was maestro di cappella at Brescia Cathedral from 1565 to 1567. He may also have gone with Contino to Mantua in 1568 when Contino began serving the Mantuan Gonzaga family; later in his life, Marenzio mentioned having spent five years in Mantua in the service of the Gonzaga family, but was unspecific as to when exactly this happened.

Following his time in Brescia and Mantua, he went to Rome, where he was employed by Cardinal Cristoforo Madruzzo until July 1578, evidently as a singer. Since Madruzzo had been the employer of Contino in Trent, this may have been arranged by Contino.

== Cardinal Luigi d'Este ==
After the cardinal's death Marenzio served at the court of Cardinal Luigi d'Este, who was a friend of Madruzzo; according to Marenzio himself, writing in the dedication of his first madrigal book, he was the cardinal's maestro di cappella, although Luigi's musical establishment only included a handful of musicians. Shortly after his hire, Luigi attempted to land a position for him with the papal choir, but was unable to do so for political reasons.

Marenzio had the opportunity to travel with Luigi in winter to spring 1580–1581 to Ferrara, the home of the Este family and one of the principal centers for composition of progressive secular music in the late 16th century. While there, he took part in the wedding festivities for Vincenzo Gonzaga and Margherita Farnese, an opulent affair requiring equally opulent music. Marenzio would have had an opportunity to hear the newly formed Concerto delle donne, the virtuoso female singers with the repertory of "secret music" that so influenced the course of madrigal composition at the end of the Renaissance. While in Ferrara Marenzio wrote and dedicated two entire books of new madrigals to Alfonso II and Lucrezia d'Este.

While Luigi made few demands on him, allowing him considerable time for his own musical pursuits, he paid him the tiny salary of only five scudi a month, about which Marenzio complained in the dedication (to Bianca Capello, Grand Duchess of Tuscany) of his Libro terzo a sei (1585). In one impassioned letter, dated 1584, Marenzio implored his employer for more prompt payment. A comment by Marenzio to the Duke of Mantua indicates that he may have had considerable other income from freelancing in Rome, either as a singer or a lutenist. Several times during his tenure with Luigi, he tried to find other work: he applied for the post of maestro di cappella at the court of Mantua; and once, in 1583, Luigi considered sending him to Paris as a gift to King Henry III of France, but the project fell through, to Marenzio's considerable relief.

During his period of employment with Cardinal Luigi d'Este Marenzio began to establish an extensive reputation as a composer. He also became known as an expert lutenist, as indicated in a letter of 1581 from a singer to Luigi d'Este; and by the time the cardinal died in 1586, Marenzio had become internationally famous as a composer, with his numerous books of madrigals published and reprinted not only in Italy, but in the Netherlands. The popularity of his work during this period is evident also in the frequency with which his madrigals appeared in anthologies.

After the death of Luigi d'Este on December 30, 1586, Marenzio was without a patron, but probably continued to freelance in Rome; and sometime in 1587 he went to Verona where he met Count Mario Bevilacqua and attended the prestigious Accademia Filarmonica, one of the associations of musicians and humanists, dedicated to cultivating the most progressive trends, typical of the late Renaissance.

== Florence and return to Rome ==
By the end of 1587, Marenzio had entered into the service of Ferdinando I de' Medici in Florence, where he stayed for two years. It is highly probable that he was already in the service of Ferdinando while the latter was still a cardinal living in Rome, and that he followed him to Florence when he succeeded to the granducal throne in 1587.

It is hard to assess the influence of Florentine composers on Marenzio's music. According to Alfred Einstein, "...he cannot conceivably have come to terms with the Camerata and with its pedantic and pretentious dilettantism." But although Marenzio never ventured into solo song, as did Giulio Caccini and other Florentines, this did not prevent him from forming friendships with two Florentine dilettante composers, Piero Strozzi and Antonio de' Bicci. On November 30, 1589 Marenzio returned to Rome, where he served several patrons, while retaining considerable independence; he lived in the Orsini palace until 1593, in the service of Virginio Orsini, the nephew of the Grand Duke of Tuscany. Another important patron at this time was Cardinal Cinzio Aldobrandini, nephew of the reigning Pope Clement VIII. This cardinal, who presided over an informal academy that gathered together men of letters and learning, assigned to Marenzio an apartment in the Vatican.

In 1595 John Dowland came to Italy to meet Marenzio; the two had exchanged letters when Dowland was still in England. Dowland got as far as Florence, and indicated that he wanted to study with Marenzio, but it is not known if he did: the two may never have met.

== Poland ==
Marenzio's final trip was a long one. He went to Poland in between late 1595 and early 1596, staying at least through October 1596, accepting a position as maestro di cappella at the court of Sigismund III Vasa in Warsaw; his predecessor, Annibale Stabile, had just died after only being there two months. While in Warsaw – the location of the court, recently moved from Kraków – Marenzio wrote and directed sacred music, including motets for double choir, a Te Deum for 13 voices, and Mass Super Iniquo odio habui, the music of which, after being lost for four centuries, was discovered after the fall of the Berlin Wall at the Staatsbibliothek Preußischer Kulturbesitz.

According to pre-20th-century writers, the trip to Poland, which was ordered by the Pope, ruined Marenzio's health. Marenzio returned from Poland by way of Venice, where he dedicated his eighth book of five-voice madrigals to the Gonzaga family. Marenzio did not live long after reaching Rome; he died on August 22, 1599, in the care of his brother at the garden of the Villa Medici on Monte Pincio. He was buried in the church of San Lorenzo in Lucina.

== Music ==
While Marenzio wrote some sacred music in the form of masses, motets, and madrigali spirituali (madrigals based on religious texts), the vast majority of his work, and his enduring legacy, is his enormous output of madrigals. They vary greatly in style, technique and tone through the two decades of his composing career. To Marenzio, each madrigal text presented its own problem, which he solved in terms of that text alone: therefore there is no single "Marenzio style", and he used the entire repertory of harmonic, textural, and rhetorical devices available to a composer of the late sixteenth century in his work. According to him, each madrigal text was a challenge of translation: printed word into music. By late in his career he was easily the most influential madrigal composer in Europe, and his earlier madrigals became the model for the new school of madrigal composition in England.

Marenzio published 23 books of madrigals and related forms, including one book of madrigali spirituali; he may have produced one further book that does not survive. Nine of the collections are for five voices (and it is possible that he produced a final tenth book); six are for six voices; two are for four voices; one is for four to six voices; and the remaining five are books of villanelle, a lighter form popular in the late 16th century, for three voices only. In addition to secular music, he published two books of motets, one of which is lost, a book of antiphons (now lost), and a book of Sacrae cantiones for five to seven voices. Almost all of his works were initially published in Venice, except for the madrigali spirituali, which appeared in Rome.

Marenzio produced seventeen books of madrigals between 1580 and 1589, which include some of the most expressive, varied and important works in madrigal literature. Most of the madrigals are for five voices, but he also wrote many four and six voice pieces, as well as a few exceptional settings for more, including one madrigal for eighteen voices for a Florentine intermedio in 1589. Text and music are always close. He varies textures, using imitative counterpoint, chordal texture, recitatives as needed to express the text. In addition to his madrigals he wrote canzonette and villanelle (related secular a cappella forms very much like madrigals, but usually a bit lighter in character). Close to 500 separate compositions survive.

Stylistically, his compositions show a generally increasing seriousness of tone throughout his life, but in all periods he was capable of the most astonishing mood-shifts within a single composition, sometimes within a single phrase; rarely does the music seem disunified, since he closely follows the texts of the poems being sung. During his last decade he not only wrote more serious, even sombre music, but experimented with chromaticism in a daring manner surpassed only by Gesualdo. For example, in the madrigal O voi che sospirate a miglior note he modulated completely around the circle of fifths within a single phrase, using enharmonic spellings within single chords (for instance, simultaneous C sharp and D flat), impossible to sing without either pitch drift or tempering intervals such that singers would approximate a sort of circulating temperament.

Madrigal O voi che sospirate a miglior note, bars 35–41, featuring a modulation through almost the entire circle of fifths "O voi che sospirate" MIDI version

Even more characteristic of his style, and a defining characteristic of the madrigal as a genre, is his use of word-painting: the technique of mirroring in the music a specific word, phrase, implication or pun on what is being sung. An obvious example would be a setting of the phrase "sinking in the sea" to a descending series of notes, or accompanying the word "anguish" with a dissonant chord followed by an unsatisfying resolution.

Marenzio was often referred to as "the divine composer" or "the sweetest swan" by his successors. Like many of his contemporaries, he used pastoral and love poems from well-known Italian poets, such as Dante and Petrarch, but few set texts as attentively to their full expressive potential as did Marenzio. Using vivid imagery expressed through text-painting, he highlighted the specific emotions and moods contained in the poem. Consequently, historians claim Marenzio brought the Italian madrigal to its highest point of artistic and technical development.

== Influence ==
Luca Marenzio was hugely influential on composers in Italy, as well as in the rest of Europe, particularly in England, as his madrigals from the 1580s were among the favorites of English composers, who adapted his techniques of word-painting, textural contrast, and chromaticism to an English idiom. As an example, when Nicholas Yonge published his Musica transalpina in 1588 in England, the first collection of Italian madrigals to be published there, Marenzio had the second-largest number of madrigals in the collection (after Alfonso Ferrabosco the elder); and the second collection of Italian madrigals published in England had more works by Marenzio than anyone else. Some English composers who admired Marenzio's expressiveness and learned from him, gradually developing their own style from that seed, included Thomas Morley, John Wilbye, and Thomas Weelkes.

Outside of England, Marenzio's madrigals also influenced composers as widely distributed as Hans Leo Hassler in South Germany and Jan Pieterszoon Sweelinck in the Low Countries. In 1622 Henry Peacham wrote, "for delicious aires and sweet invention in madrigals, Luca Marenzio excelleth all others." This quote by Peacham illustrates the effect Luca Marenzio had on later development of the madrigal, and the admiration he elicited from other composers from that period. Even in the mid-seventeenth century, Italian and English commentators continued to extol the virtues of Marenzio's compositions; his music appeared in arrangements for viols late in the century; and his music has continued to be sung almost without interruption to the present day by madrigal groups – one of very few Renaissance composers for whom that is true.
