= Stile concertato =

Early Baroque music term describing a shared melody

The stile concertato (Italian: [ˈstiːle kontʃerˈtaːto], lit. 'concerted style') (Note: Also referred to in English as the "concertato style".) is a style of early Baroque music in which groups of instruments or voices share a melody, usually in alternation, and almost always over a basso continuo. The word concertato is the past participle of the Italian verb concertare meaning ‘to agree, act together’, from the Latin verb concertare originally meaning “to contend or strive”.

A somewhat oversimplified, but useful distinction between stile concertato and concerto can be made: the stile concertato involves contrast between opposing groups of voices and groups of instruments: the concerto style, especially as it developed into the concerto grosso later in the Baroque, involves contrast between large and small groups of similar composition (later called "ripieno" and "concertino").

The style developed in Venice in the late 16th century, mainly through the work of Andrea and Giovanni Gabrieli, who were working in the unique acoustical space of St Mark's Basilica. Different choirs or instrumental groupings occupied positions across the basilica from each other: because of the sound delay from one side to the other in the large and acoustically "live" space, a perfect unison was difficult, and composers found that a fantastically effective music could be composed with the choirs singing across to each other, in stereo as it were; all accompanied by organ or other groups of instruments placed in such a way that they could hear each group equally well. Music written there was quickly performed elsewhere, and compositions in the new stile concertato quickly became popular elsewhere in Europe (first in northern Italy, then in Germany and the rest of Italy, and then gradually in other parts of the continent). Another term sometimes used for this antiphonal use of the choirs in St Mark's was cori spezzati. See also Venetian polychoral style and Venetian School.

In the early 17th century, almost all music with voices and basso continuo was called a concerto, though this use of the term is considerably different from the more modern meaning (a solo instrument or instruments accompanied by an orchestra). Often, sacred music in the stile concertato in the early 17th century was descended from the motet: the texts that a hundred years earlier would have been set for a cappella voices singing in smooth polyphony, would now be set for voices and instruments in a stile concertato. These pieces, no longer always called motets, were given a variety of names including concerto, Psalm (if a psalm setting), sinfonia, or symphoniae (for example in Heinrich Schütz's three books of Symphoniae sacrae).

The stile concertato made possible the composition of extremely dramatic music, one of the characteristic innovations of the early Baroque.

== Composers of music in stile concertato ==
- Giovanni Croce
- Ignazio Donati
- Andrea Gabrieli
- Giovanni Gabrieli
- Alessandro Grandi
- Johann Kaspar Kerll
- Claudio Monteverdi
- Michael Praetorius
- Samuel Scheidt
- Johann Hermann Schein
- Heinrich Schütz
- Lodovico Viadana

== Sources ==
- Manfred Bukofzer, Music in the Baroque Era. New York, W.W. Norton & Co., 1947. (ISBN 0-393-09745-5)
- Honegger, Marc (1976). "STILE CONCERTATO". Science de la musique: Formes, technique, instruments (in French).
- Keefe, Simon P. (2001). Mozart's Piano Concertos. Boydell & Brewer. ISBN 978-0-85115-834-1.
- The New Harvard Dictionary of Music, ed. Don Randel. Cambridge, Massachusetts, Harvard University Press, 1986. (ISBN 0-674-61525-5)
- Article "concertato" in The New Grove Dictionary of Music and Musicians, ed. Stanley Sadie. 20 vol. London, Macmillan Publishers Ltd., 1980. (ISBN 1-56159-174-2)
- Smith, Peter (1987). Concerted Sacred Music of the Bologna School. A-R Editions. ISBN 978-0-89579-221-1.
- Ulrich, Homer (1973). A Survey of Choral Music. Harcourt Brace Jovanovich. ISBN 978-0-15-584863-4.
