= Lodovico Grossi da Viadana =

Italian composer (c.1560–1627)

Lodovico Grossi da Viadana (usually Lodovico Viadana, though his family name was Grossi; c. 1560 – 2 May 1627) was an Italian composer, teacher, and Franciscan friar of the Order of Friars Minor Observants. He was the first significant figure to make use of the newly developed technique of figured bass, one of the musical devices which was to define the end of the Renaissance and beginning of the Baroque eras in music.

== Life ==
He was born in Viadana, a town in the province of Mantua, Italy. According to a document dating from about 150 years after his death, he was a member of the Grossi family but took the name of his birth city, Viadana, when he entered the order of the Minor Observants prior to 1588. Though there is no contemporary evidence, it has been claimed that he studied with Costanzo Porta, becoming choirmaster at the cathedral in Mantua by 1594. In 1597 he went to Rome, and in 1602 he became choirmaster at the cathedral of San Luca in Mantua. He held a succession of posts at various cathedrals in Italy, including Concordia (near Venice), and Fano, on the east coast of Italy, where he was maestro di cappella from 1610 to 1612. For three years, from 1614 to 1617, he held a position in his religious order which covered the entire province of Bologna (including Ferrara, Mantua and Piacenza). By 1623 he had moved to Busseto, and later he worked at the convent of Santa Andrea, in Gualtieri, near Parma. He died in Gualtieri.

== Music and significance ==
Viadana is important in the development of the early Baroque technique of basso continuo, and its notational method, known as figured bass. While he did not invent the method—figured basses occur in published sources from at least as early as 1597—he was the first to use it in a widely distributed collection of sacred music (Cento concerti con il basso continuo), which he published in Venice in 1602. Agostino Agazzari in 1607 published a treatise describing how to interpret the new figured bass, though it is clear that many performers had by this time already learned the new method, at least in the most progressive musical centres in Italy.
