= Der Gerechte kömmt um (motet) =

Motet with arrangement attributed to Johann Sebastian Bach

- BWV 1149
- Motet by J. S. Bach
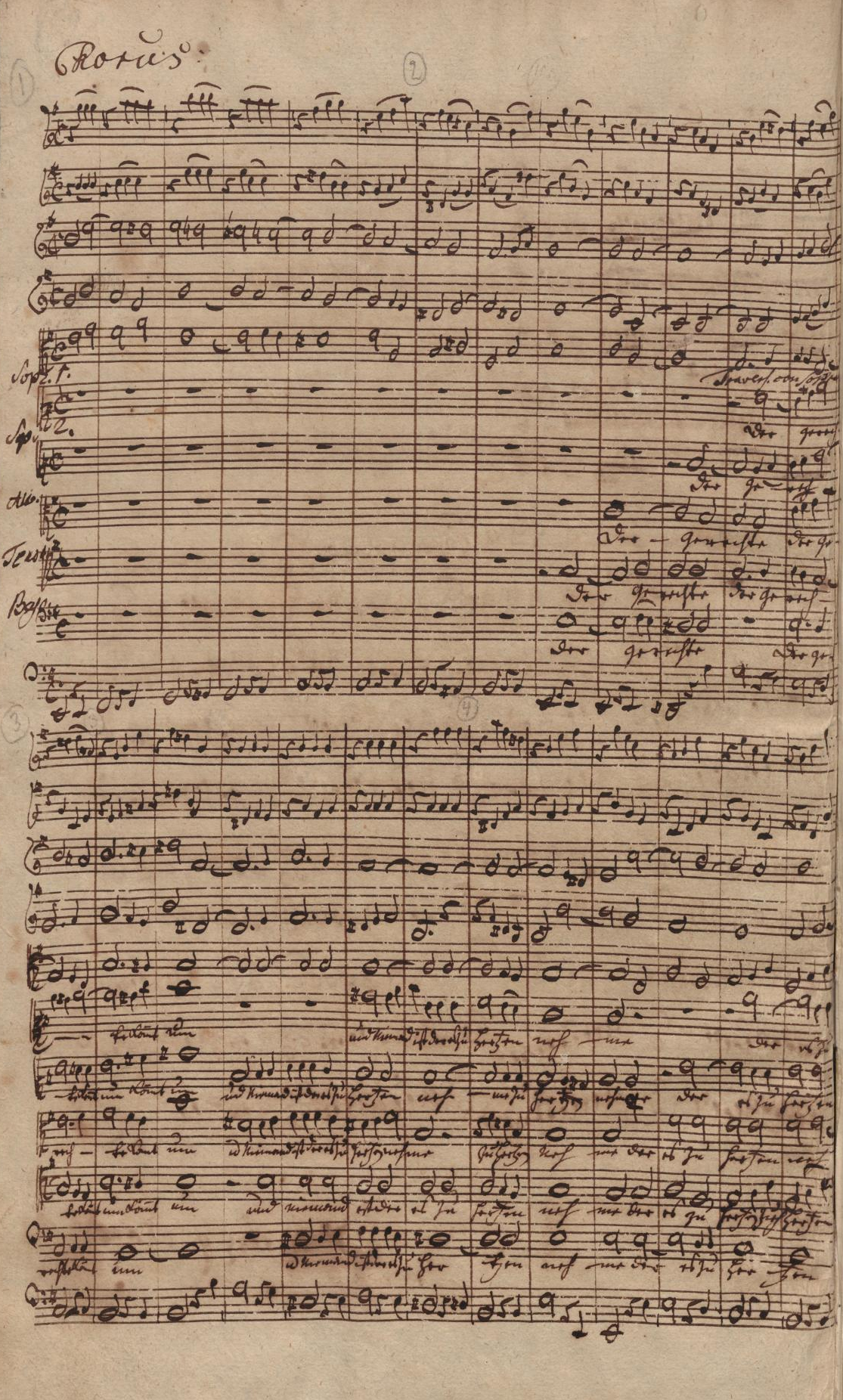
- First page of "Der Gerechte kömmt um", No. 39 in Wer ist der, so von Edom kömmt
- English: The righteous perishes
- Key: E minor
- Occasion: Good Friday; Funeral?
- Written: arrangement attributed to J. S. Bach
- Text: Isaiah 57:1–2
- Language: German
- Based on: Tristis est anima mea attributed to Johann Kuhnau
- Vocal: SSATB
- Instrumental: 2 traversos; 2 oboes; strings; continuo

Der Gerechte kömmt um ('The righteous perishes'), BWV 1149, is a motet for SSATB singers and instrumental ensemble, which, for its music, is based on the five-part a cappella motet Tristis est anima mea attributed to Johann Kuhnau, and has the Luther Bible translation of Isaiah 57:1–2 as text. The arrangement of the Latin motet, that is, transposing it to E minor, adjusting its music to the new text, and expanding it with an instrumental score for two traversos, two oboes, strings and basso continuo, is attributed to Johann Sebastian Bach. The setting is found in a manuscript copy, likely written down in the 1750s, of Wer ist der, so von Edom kömmt, a Passion oratorio which is a pasticcio based on compositions by, among others, Carl Heinrich Graun, Georg Philipp Telemann and Bach. Likely Der Gerechte kömmt um existed as a stand-alone motet, for example for performance on Good Friday or at a funeral, before being adopted in the pasticcio.

== Music ==
The oldest extant source for the Tristis est anima mea motet attributed to Johann Kuhnau is D-B Mus.ms. 12263/3, an 18th-century manuscript previously known as SBB Mus.ms. autogr. J. Kuhnau 1. This score, written by an unknown scribe (not Kuhnau in any case), originated between the 1720s and around 1760. The oldest extant source for Der Gerechte kömmt um is D-B Mus.ms. 8155, which contains the score of Wer ist der, so von Edom kömmt, a pasticcio Passion oratorio. This manuscript originated in the second half of the 1750s. The pasticcio's components include 31 movements from Carl Heinrich Graun's Ein Lämmlein geht und trägt die Schuld, GraunWV B:VII:4 (composed between 1725 and 1735), two movements of a church cantata by Georg Philipp Telemann (TWV 1:1585, composed in 1722) and a variant of the opening chorus of Johann Sebastian Bach's cantata Herr Jesu Christ, wahr' Mensch und Gott, BWV 127 (composed in 1725). The exact time of origin of either the Tristis est anima mea motet or Der Gerechte kömmt um can not be ascertained, and, according to Daniel R. Melamed, it can even not be excluded that the latter was composed first, and that the Latin motet was derived from it. Usually, however, it is assumed that Der Gerechte kömmt um was arranged from the motet attributed to Kuhnau.

Stylistically, the motet attributed to Kuhnau leans on earlier Italian models. There is, for instance, some similarity between the Tristis est anima mea motet attributed to Kuhnau and a 16th-century motet with the same text by Orlando di Lasso: both are five-part a cappella compositions with F as tonal center, and they both have a similar succession of entries of the vocal parts, with these parts switching to homophony on the same words. The motet attributed to Kuhnau is written for two soprano voices, alto, tenor and bass, which are the same vocal forces as those required for the Der Gerechte kömmt um version. Apart from the concluding 114th bar, which has the duration of a double breve, the meter of the Latin motet is alla breve. Der Gerechte kömmt um has the same meter, and 16 more bars of music. This setting, in E minor, that is half a tone lower than the Latin motet version in F minor, opens with an instrumental prelude of 8 bars, written for two oboes, two violins, viola and continuo. The same 8 bars of music, transposed to B minor, are also inserted as an interlude further on in the Der Gerechte kömmt um version. Two traversos play colla parte with the first soprano.

The motet attributed to Kuhnau is structured in eight sections, each of which consecutively sets one of the eight phrases of the Latin text. The German arrangement is structured as an instrumental prelude followed by a block treating the first four phrases of the German text, followed by an instrumental interlude, and concluded by a block that treats the last four phrases of the German text. According to John Eliot Gardiner, the instrumental introduction prefigures Wolfgang Amadeus Mozart's Requiem, K. 626. The continuo largely follows the vocal bass during the singing, and may even be derived from a lost continuo part of the Latin motet, if it ever had one. The violin and viola parts often stay close to the singers' middle voices. The two oboe parts are entirely independent of the melody lines of the vocalists, and enrich the harmony. The instrumental parts also add contrasting rhythmical patterns. John W. Grubbs compares the orchestral setting with a similar one in the "Qui tollis" movement of Bach's Mass in B minor. Diethard Hellmann also sees similarities with the instrumental parts of BWV 48/1 and 118.2.

The vocal parts of the motet attributed to Kuhnau and the Der Gerechte kömmt um contrafactum are not entirely identical: differences seem mostly inspired by differences in text expression and diction between the German and Latin texts. Changes in the vocal parts, which include addition of transition notes, also lead to different harmonies, and to a closer connection of some of the consecutive phrases. 18th-century sources, such as the D-B Mus.ms. 8155 manuscript, carry no indication of how and when the Der Gerechte kömmt um version originated. According to Grubbs, the middle voices of the work lack the elasticity which is characteristic for a composition by Bach. The intricacies of the German version, including its additional instrumental material and various adjustments to vocal lines, point to Bach as arranger, while they are in line with what is known from arrangements the composer produced of his own work and that of others.

== Text ==
The Latin text of the motet attributed to Kuhnau, "Tristis est anima mea usque ad mortem" ('My soul is sorrowful even unto death'), is traditionally associated with Holy Week, that is the week leading up to Easter, as it is the second Tenebrae responsory, one of the responsories associated with Maundy Thursday in traditional Catholicism. Such responsories remind Christ's suffering, leading up to his death, which is the central theme of Christian services on Good Friday. The text of the Der Gerechte kömmt um version of the motet, the Luther Bible translation of Isaiah 57:1–2, is the German version of another such responsory, indicated as "Ecce quomodo moritur justus" in Latin ('Behold how the just man dies'). On content, there is enough correspondence between the "Tristis est" and the Isaiah 57:1–2 texts to fit the same music. The Isaiah 57:1–2 text, even more than the "Tristis est" text, was adopted in Protestantism as part of Good Week services: like in Catholicism, where it was the 24th responsory for Holy Week, it was a common part of the main service held on Good Friday. For instance in Leipzig, where the text, in Jacobus Gallus's motet setting of its Latin version, was already customary as part of Good Friday services before Gallus's setting was published with a German translation in the 17th-century Neu Leipziger Gesangbuch.

^{1} Der Gerechte kömmt um,
und niemand ist der es zu Herzen nehme;
und heilige Leute werden aufgerafft,
und niemand achtet drauf.

Denn die Gerechten werden weggerafft vor dem Unglück;
^{2} und die richtig vor sich gewandelt haben
kommen zum Frieden
und ruhen in ihren Kammern.

—Isaiah 57:1–2 in Luther Bible
Translation:

The righteous perishes,
and no man lays it to heart;
and merciful men are taken away,
none considering

that the righteous is taken away from the evil to come;
And those who walk in their uprightness
enter into peace
and rest in their beds.

—translation after Isaiah 57:1–2 in World English Bible

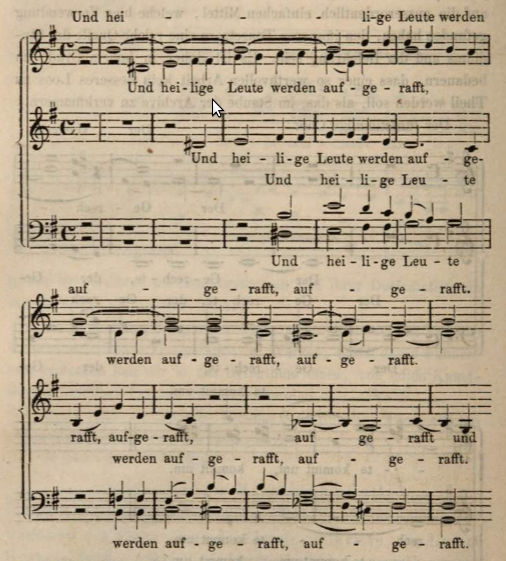
Start of "Und heilige Leute werden aufgerafft" (voices only), edited by Karl Hermann Bitter (1872)

The setting of the third phrase (und heilige Leute werden aufgerafft), bars 28–38, ends on a harmonically surprising cadence, which, according to Grubbs, prefigures passages from Johannes Brahms's 19th-century German Requiem, Op. 45. The last phrase before the instrumental intermezzo (und niemand achtet drauf) is repeated. The fifth phrase (Denn die Gerechten werden weggerafft vor dem Unglück) is set homophonically. The sixth phrase (und die richtig vor sich gewandelt haben) is, like the fourth, repeated. According to Gardiner, the composition culminates in the bar of silence between the seventh phrase (kommen zum Frieden) and the coda of the last phrase (und ruhen in ihren Kammern).

== Passion oratorio movement ==
The Wer ist der, so von Edom kömmt pasticcio Passion oratorio has 42 movements. Part I of the pasticcio has 18 movements, exclusively derived from Telemann's cantata TWV 1:1585 (first two movements) and from Part I of Graun's Passion cantata Ein Lämmlein geht und trägt die Schuld (remaining 16 movements). Part II of the Passion oratorio starts with two Bach movements, respectively a variant of BWV 127/1, and BWV 1088, and has 15 movements derived from Part II of Graun's Passion cantata. Its narrative is carried by 6 inserted stanzas of Michael Weiße's hymn "Christus, der uns selig macht". "Der Gerechte kömmt um" is the 39th movement of the pasticcio, placed between four-part settings of the 6th and 7th stanzas of Weiße's hymn: these stanzas respectively portray a scene of Jesus hanging at the cross (before his death), and the burial of Jesus. The Isaiah 57:1–2 text, lamenting the death of the righteous, is placed between these stanzas as a meditation on Christ's death. It is not the only occurrence of texts from the Book of Isaiah in the Passion oratorio: four movements adopted from the Graun cantata, respectively Nos. 17, 3, 7 and 11 in the pasticcio, have Isaiah 53:3–5 as text.

Around 1800, a set of performance parts of the "Der Gerechte kömmt um" choir was extracted from the D-B Mus.ms. 8155 manuscript, likely for a performance of the movement by the Sing-Akademie zu Berlin. In a 1872 publication, Karl Hermann Bitter described the 39th movement of the Passion oratorio thus:

Der fünfstimmige Chor:
Der Gerechte kömmt um
(2 Oboen. Quartett. E-moll ^{4}/_{4}) ist von wunderbarer Tiefe, voll von den herrlichsten Gedanken; im strengsten Contrapunkt gesetzt, ist er doch von einer Milde und Weichheit, sowie im Verlaufe der Ausführung von einer melodischen Schönheit, welche sich weit über das zu jener Zeit sonst vorhandene Maass der Melodik hinaus erhebt, und mit welcher eine in die moderne Harmoniebildung vorgreifende Behandlung des Satzes Hand in Hand geht,
Und heilige Leute werden aufgerafft
ein heiliger Klage-Gesang von dem allerschönsten Inhalt.

—Karl Hermann Bitter
Translation:

The five-part choir:
Der Gerechte kömmt um
(2 oboes; [string] quartet; E minor ^{4}/_{4}) has a wonderful depth, filled with the most exquisite thoughts; set in strictest counterpoint, it is nonetheless mild and soft, and in the course of its execution of a melodic beauty which is far above the measure of melodies available at the time, going hand in hand with a treatment of the setting which runs ahead of a modern harmonisation,
Und heilige Leute werden aufgerafft
a sacred lament with the most beautiful content.

—translation

In January 1990, Hermann Max, conducting the Rheinische Kantorei and Das Kleine Konzert, recorded the Wer ist der, so von Edom kömmt pasticcio, including the "Der Gerechte kömmt um" movement with a performance time of 4:24. In the first half of 2019, Gotthold Schwarz conducted Concerto Vocale and the Saxon Baroque Orchestra Leipzig in a recording of the Passion oratorio, the performance time of its 39th movement being 5:28. Another recording of the pasticcio was realized in 2020, by György Vashegyi conducting the Purcell Choir and Orfeo Orchestra, with a performance time of 5:58 for the "Der Gerechte kömmt um" movement.

== Motet ==
There are reasons why Der Gerechte kömmt um likely was a motet in its own right before it was adopted into the Wer ist der, so von Edom kömmt pasticcio: first, its model, the Tristis est anima mea setting attributed to Kuhnau, was a stand-alone motet, also, most of the movements of the pasticcio demonstrably existed before being adopted in the Passion oratorio, and further, the colla parte flutes rather seem an addition designed to exploit the full orchestral forces needed for a performance of the Passion oratorio, than an original part of the Der Gerechte kömmt um composition. In an article published in 2002, Peter Wollny identified the scribe of the D-B Mus.ms. 8155 manuscript as Johann Christoph Farlau: that identification made it less likely than previously thought that Bach would have been involved in the compilation of the Wer ist der, so von Edom kömmt pasticcio, thus, if Der Gerechte kömmt um was arranged by Bach, it must have been adopted in the pasticcio from a separate composition. A stand-alone Der Gerechte kömmt um motet may, in the first half of the 18th century, have been intended for a performance during Good Week (e.g. as a modernized version replacing an earlier Latin motet), and/or as a motet to be sung at funerals. Around 1972, Hänssler published Der Gerechte kömmt um as a motet for two oboes, strings and continuo, edited by Hellmann. After being marked BWV deest for several decades, the motet arrangement, attributed to Bach, was given the BWV number 1149.

In November 1978, the Choir of Christ Church Cathedral, Oxford, and the Academy of Ancient Music, conducted by Simon Preston, recorded Der Gerechte kömmt um, with a performance time of 5:20. Gardiner recorded the motet in April 1980, with the Monteverdi Choir and the English Baroque Soloists (performance time: 6:56). Helmuth Rilling conducted the Gächinger Kantorei and the Bach-Collegium Stuttgart in a 1990 recording of the motet (performance time: 4:47). Salamon Kamp, conducting the Kodály Choir and Bach-Collegium of Debrecen, recorded the motet in 1992 (performance time: 5:16). Regularly performing Der Gerechte kömmt um as an encore, Gardiner recorded the motet live in July 2000, as part of the Bach Cantata Pilgrimage. This recording, with a performance time of 7:41, was released in 2009, and was in 2018 also included in the Bach 333 box set with the complete recordings of Bach's work. A recording of the motet by the Norddeutscher Figuralchor, conducted by Jörg Straube, was released in March 2003 (performance time: 5:05). Raphaël Pichon recorded the motet with Ensemble Pygmalion in October 2007 (performance time: 6:23). In April 2017, the American Bach Soloists, conducted by Jeffrey Thomas, performed the motet in concert, and recorded it.

== Sources ==
- "D-B Mus.ms. 8155". Bach Digital. Leipzig: Bach Archive; et al. 13 January 2020.
- "D-B Mus.ms. 8185". Bach Digital. Leipzig: Bach Archive; et al. 12 January 2020.
- "Der Gerechte kömmt um". Bach Digital. Leipzig: Bach Archive; et al. 25 May 2019.
- "Herr Jesu Christ, wahr' Mensch und Gott BWV 127". Bach Digital. Leipzig: Bach Archive; et al. 16 November 2020.
- Billinge, Dave (October 2015). "Alpha Classics 302". MusicWeb International.
- Bitter, Karl Hermann (1872). "Siebenzehnter Brief: Weiteres über Händel – Graun – Dessen geistliche Cantaten" [Seventeenth letter: More about Handel; Graun; his sacred cantatas]. Beiträge zur Geschichte des Oratoriums [Contributions to the history of the oratorio] (in German). Berlin: Oppenheim. pp. 318–335.
- Ebata, Nobuaki, ed. (9 January 2020). "D-B Mus.ms. 12263/3". Bach Digital. Leipzig: Bach Archive; et al.
- Gardiner, John Eliot (2009). "Cantatas for the Sixth Sunday after Trinity: St Gumbertus, Ansbach". Bach Cantatas Vol. 4: Ansbach/Haddington (PDF) (liner notes). Soli Deo Gloria. pp. 9–13. SDG156 – via Hyperion.
- Grubbs, John W. (1965). "Ein Passions-Pasticcio des 18. Jahrhunderts" [A pasticcio Passion of the 18th century]. In Dürr, Alfred; Neumann, Werner (eds.). Bach-Jahrbuch 1965 [Bach-Yearbook 1965]. Bach-Jahrbuch (in German). Vol. 51. Translated by Dürr, Alfred. Neue Bachgesellschaft. Berlin: Evangelische Verlagsanstalt (published 1966). pp. 10–42. doi:10.13141/bjb.v1965 – via Qucosa.
- Hellmann, Diethard (1967). "Eine Kuhnau-Bearbeitung Joh. Seb. Bachs?" [Joh. Seb. Bach's arrangement of a composition by Kuhnau?]. In Dürr, Alfred; Neumann, Werner (eds.). Bach-Jahrbuch 1967 [Bach-Yearbook 1967]. Bach-Jahrbuch (in German). Vol. 53. Neue Bachgesellschaft. Berlin: Evangelische Verlagsanstalt (published 1968). pp. 93–99. doi:10.13141/bjb.v1967 – via Qucosa.
- Jeż, Tomasz (2007). "The Motets of Jacob Handl in Inter-confessional Silesian Liturgical Practice". De Musica Disserenda. III (2): 37–48.
- Melamed, Daniel R. (1995). "Der Gerechte kommt um". J.S. Bach and the German Motet. Cambridge University Press. pp. 143–149. ISBN 0-52-141864-X.
- Morton, Wyant (1992). Questions of authenticity in three motets attributed to Johann Sebastian Bach (DMA). University of Arizona. hdl:10150/185862. Docket 9229856.
- Thomas, Jeffrey (2017). "Bach: Motets for Double Chorus". American Bach Soloists.
- Vopelius, Gottfried (1682). Neu Leipziger Gesangbuch. Leipzig: Klinger. pp. 263–267.
- Winn, Steven (3 April 2017). "American Bach Soloists Illuminate Divinity in the Details". San Francisco Classical Voice.
- Wollny, Peter (2002). "Tennstedt, Leipzig, Naumburg, Halle - Neuerkenntnisse zur Bach-Überlieferung in Mitteldeutschland". In Schulze, Hans-Joachim; Wolff, Christoph (eds.). Bach-Jahrbuch 2002. Bach-Jahrbuch (in German). Vol. 88. Neue Bachgesellschaft. Leipzig: Evangelische Verlagsanstalt. pp. 29–60. doi:10.13141/bjb.v2002. ISBN 3-374-02031-3. ISSN 0084-7682 – via Qucosa.
