= Passions (Bach) =

Compositions by Johann Sebastian Bach

As Thomaskantor, Johann Sebastian Bach provided Passion music for Good Friday services in Leipzig. The extant St Matthew Passion and St John Passion are Passion oratorios composed by Bach.

== Passions composed and/or staged by Bach ==
According to his "Nekrolog", the 1754 obituary written by Johann Friedrich Agricola and the composer's son Carl Philipp Emanuel, Bach wrote "five Passions, of which one is for double chorus". The double chorus one is easily identified as the St Matthew Passion. The St John Passion is the only extant other one that is certainly composed by Bach. The libretto of the St Mark Passion was published in Bach's time, allowing reconstruction based on the pieces Bach is known to have parodied for its composition, while the extant St Luke Passion likely contains little or no music composed by Bach. Which Bach compositions, apart from the known ones, may have been meant in the obituary remains uncertain.

The St John Passion is shorter and has simpler orchestration than the St Matthew Passion. The St John Passion has been described as more realistic, faster paced and more anguished than the reflective and resigned St. Matthew Passion.

=== St John Passion ===
The St John Passion, BWV 245 is the first Passion Bach composed during his tenure as Thomaskantor in Leipzig, a tenure that started after the Easter season of 1723. Apart from the German translation of parts of the Gospel of St John and several Lutheran chorales, it used text of the Brockes Passion for its arias. The Passion was performed on Good Friday of 1724, 1725, 1730 and 1749.

=== St Matthew Passion ===
The double chorus St Matthew Passion, BWV 244 was composed on a libretto by Picander for Good Friday of 1727 and/or 1729. After revision the Passion was performed again in 1736 and 1742.

=== St Luke Passion ===
Bach's copy of an anonymous St Luke Passion, BWV 246, was published in the Bach Gesellschaft Complete Works (vol. xlv/2) but is regarded as spurious, with the possible exception of the introduction to the second half.

=== St Mark Passion ===
Bach wrote the St Mark Passion, BWV 247 for 1731. Picander's libretto for the Passion was once thought to have been destroyed in the bombing of Dresden in World War II, but the recovered copy seems to show that the work was a parody of music from the so-called Trauer-Ode, Laß, Fürstin, laß noch einen Strahl, BWV 198, and that some choruses were used also in the Christmas Oratorio. There are several reconstructions of the Passion.

=== Other Passions ===
In his 1802 Bach-biography Johann Nikolaus Forkel repeats what is in the "Nekrolog" regarding the number of Passions composed by Bach. In his 1850 Bach-biography Carl L. Hilgenfeldt attempts to identify all five of the Passions mentioned in the "Nekrolog" and by Forkel. After mentioning the St Matthew, the St John, the St Luke and Picander's libretto of the lost St Mark, Hilgenfeldt mentions a Passion Bach would have composed in 1717, which was the last year Bach was employed in Weimar.

Thus the "fifth" Passion possibly refers to Passion music Bach composed before his tenure as Thomaskantor in Leipzig, parts of which may have been recuperated in his extant Passions. It may also refer to one of the Passion oratorio pasticcios Bach was involved in and/or to a setting of Picander's Erbauliche Gedanken auf den Grünen Donnerstag und Charfreitag über den Leidenden Jesum, published in 1725.

==== Weimarer Passion ====
Weimarer Passion, BWV deest, BC D 1, refers to the 1717 Passion mentioned by Hilgenfeldt. It appears to have been performed at the court in Gotha on Good Friday 26 March 1717. Bach appears to have recuperated some of its material in later compositions, notably in his St John Passion.

==== Jesus Christus ist um unsrer Missetat willen verwundet ====
In the early 1710s Bach staged Jesus Christus ist um unsrer Missetat willen verwundet, a St Mark Passion, in Weimar. Bach added some of his own chorale settings to that Passion which was probably composed by Gottfried Keiser (older attributions of the original work are to Reinhard Keiser, Gottfried's son, and later to Friedrich Nicolaus Brauns). This Weimar version is known as BC 5a.

He staged a new version of this St Mark Passion pasticcio, BC 5b, in Leipzig in 1726, and finally, expanded with some arias from Handel's Brockes Passion, again in the last years of his life (BNB I/K/2).

==== Erbauliche Gedanken auf den Grünen Donnerstag und Charfreitag über den Leidenden Jesum ====
The Passion text included in Picander's Sammlung Erbaulicher Gedanken was published around the time (or shortly before) Bach started his collaboration with this librettist. Bach used six parts of this Passion libretto in his St Matthew Passion, but there is no indication he set anything else of this libretto. As such the Passion libretto was classified among the works spuriously attributed to Bach in the Anhang (Appendix) of the Bach-Werke-Verzeichnis, as BWV Anh. 169.

==== Wer ist der, so von Edom kömmt ====
Wer ist der, so von Edom kömmt, a pasticcio Passion oratorio possibly compiled by Bach's son-in-law Johann Christoph Altnickol, contains a few movements attributed to Bach, including the arioso for bass BWV 1088, and Der Gerechte kömmt um (an arrangement of a SSATB motet attributed to Johann Kuhnau). The pasticcio may have been performed in Leipzig in the late 1740s and/or the early 1750s.

==== Stölzel's Ein Lämmlein geht und trägt die Schuld ====
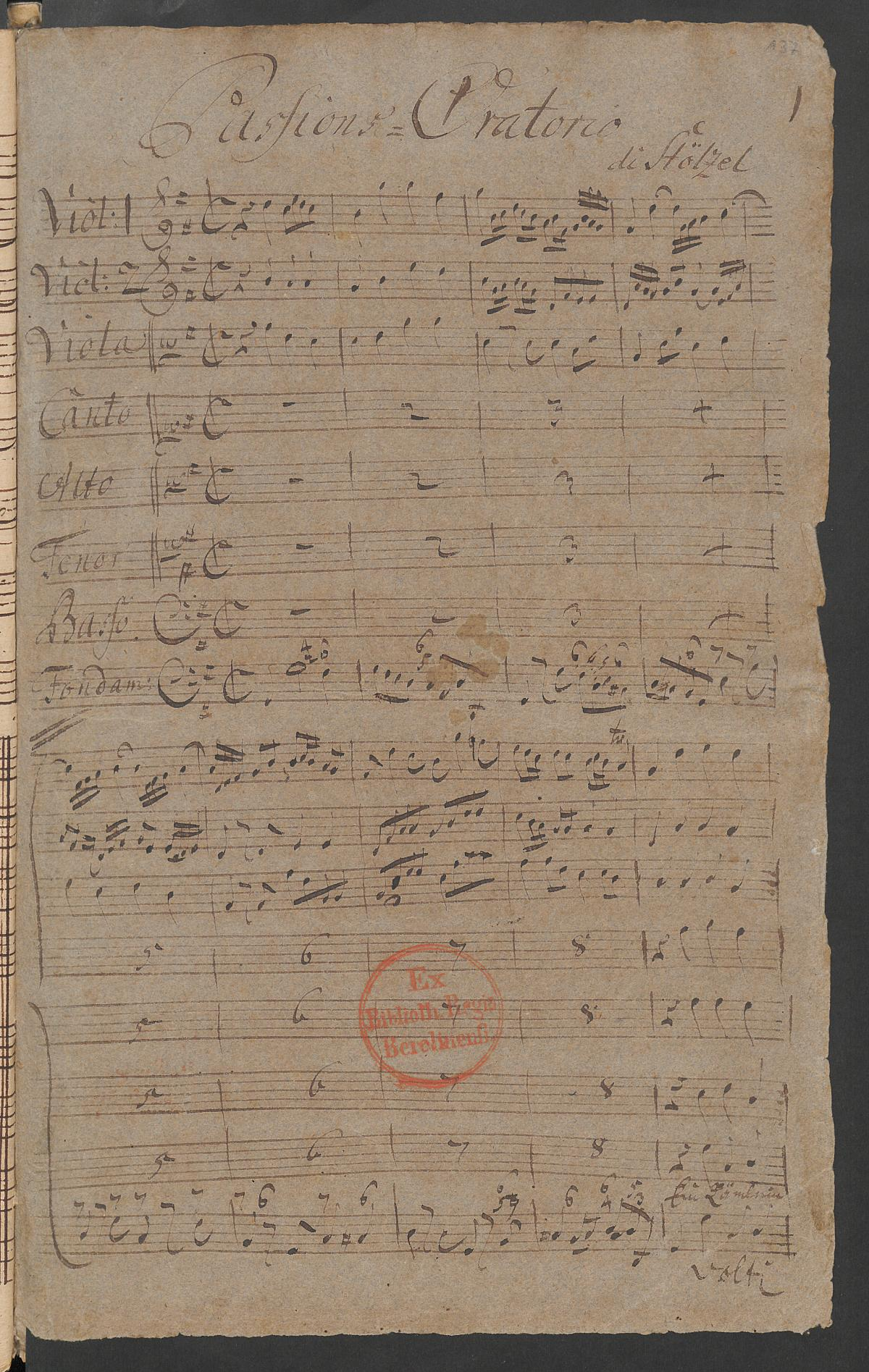
First page of a manuscript copy from around 1750 of Gottfried Heinrich Stölzel's Ein Lämmlein geht und trägt die Schuld Passion oratorio (1720)

Bach performed Gottfried Heinrich Stölzel's Die leidende und am Creutz sterbende Liebe Jesu on Good Friday of 1734. This Passion oratorio, composed for Gotha in 1720, is also known after the incipit of its opening chorus, a setting of Paul Gerhardt's "Ein Lämmlein geht und trägt die Schuld". Bach arranged one of its arias, "Dein Kreuz, o Bräutgam meiner Seelen", as Bekennen will ich seinen Namen, BWV 200. This arrangement, dated around 1742–1743, was possibly part of a cantata for the feast of Purification of the Virgin Mary.

==== Graun's passion-oratorios (or passion-cantatas) ====
Bach also knew a few passion-oratorios composed by Carl Heinrich Graun. He performed Graun's Ein Lämmlein geht und trägt die Schuld sometime in the 1730s-1740s, and even had a copy of the score in his library. The same with his "Great Passion" Kommt her und schaut.

==== Telemann's passion-oratorios ====
Bach also knew of a few passion-oratorios by Georg Philipp Telemann (his friend and Godfather to Carl Philipp Emanuel). In addition to Telemann's Brockes Passion, there is evidence that Bach performed the original (Hamburg) version of his ''Seliges Erwägen des Leidens und Sterbens Jesu Christi'' TWV 5:2a between 1732 and 1735.

==== Handel's passion-oratorio ====
Bach also knew of George Frideric Handel's setting of the Passion text by Barthold Heinrich Brockes (Brockes Passion). This is exemplified by a manuscript copy by Bach and one of his principal copyists dating from 1746 to 1748. Bach is known to have performed this work on Good Friday 1746, and used 7 arias from it in his last Passion-Pasticcio on the Hamburg St. Mark Passion (BNB I/K/2).

== Good Friday services in Leipzig ==
Bach's Leipzig Passions were performed at Vespers on Good Friday, alternating between the principal churches of St. Thomas (uneven years) and St. Nicholas (even years). The order of service was:

1. Hymn: Da Jesus an den Kreuze stund
2. Passion, part 1
3. Sermon
4. Passion, part 2
5. Motet: Ecce quomodo moritur in Jacob Handl's setting
6. Collect & Benediction
7. Hymn: Nun danket alle Gott

A more detailed layout of the Order of Service for Good Friday Vespers is as follows:

#	Congregation	Choir	Preacher and Ministers
1	Ringing of Bells	As "de Tempore" song "Da Jesus an dem Kreuze stund"	
2		Passion (figural), Part I	
3	Song "O Lamm Gottes, unschuldig"		
4			Priest enters the pulpit Pulpit greeting Announcement of Sermon
5	Song "Herr Jesu Christ, dich zu uns wend"		
6			Lord's Prayer prayed silently
7			Reading of the Sermon text Passion Harmony by Johannes Bugenhagen from the section on the Burial of Jesus
8			Sermon (about 1 Hr.)
9			Pulpit blessing
10		Passion, Part II	
11		Motet Ecce quomodo moritur justus by Jacobus Gallus	
12	Song "O Traurigkeit, o Herzeleid"		
13			Collect; Blessing
14	Song "Nun danket alle Gott"		

The first time a concerted Passion in two parts was performed according to this order of service was in 1721, when Johann Kuhnau, Bach's predecessor, was given permission to perform the Passion he had composed in the St. Thomas Church. Four years earlier, Georg Philipp Telemann's Brockes Passion, TWV 5:1, performed in the New Church, was the first Passion Oratorio that had been staged in Leipzig.

=== Structure ===
A first feature of the structure of the Passions Bach wrote for Leipzig follows from the order of service: the Passions needed to be in two parts, for performance before and after the sermon. A second structural feature specific for Leipzig is the recitation of the unaltered Gospel text, as in Leipzig it was not allowed to paraphrase the Gospel in Passion presentations: for this reason an unaltered setting of the Brockes Passion, which contained a lot of such paraphrasing loosely based on all four Gospel texts of Christ's Passion, was not possible, although Bach returned often to Brockes' text, choosing parts of its poetry as lyrics for commenting arias after recitations of the Gospel text. For this reason Bach's Passions for Leipzig are named after the Evangelist from whose Gospel the Passion text is used.

Another characteristic of Bach's Passions are the chorales set in four-part harmony that recur often throughout the compositions. These chorales, representing a Lutheran tradition, were highly recognizable, both the text and the melody, by the audience for which he wrote his Passions. It is even surmised Bach intended the audience to participate by singing along with the chorales they knew.

Bach's Passions are set for an orchestra with strings, woodwind instruments such as oboes and flutes, and a continuo including organ. The Lenten period did however not allow usage of (festive) brass instruments like trumpets. The vocal forces include SATB choir (or double SATB choir for the St Matthew Passion) and vocal soloists. In Bach's time none of the vocalists were women: the high voice parts were traditionally sung by treble choristers.

The Gospel readings, set as a secco recitative for the Evangelist, complemented with recitatives and turba choruses by the characters and groups having direct speech in the text, are presented in parts of a few verses, alternating with commenting chorales and/or arias with a free verse text. In most cases the arias are preceded by non-Gospel accompagnato recitatives. Apart from these sections, Bach composed grand choral movements with which to open or close the two parts of his Passions.

Schematically, this is the structure of Bach's Passions:

- Part One:
  - Grand opening chorus with all forces from orchestra and chorus
    - Reading of a few verses from the Gospel text as a (secco) recitative, concluded by turba, chorale and/or (recitative and) aria
    - Reading of the next section of Gospel text in the same way, and concluded in the same way.
    - (...continue with similar units...)
    - Last recitative of Part One: this unit is always concluded by a movement with chorus
- Part Two:
  - Movement with chorus and/or vocal soloist opening Part Two
    - (...sequence of units as in Part One...)
  - Closing movement(s) of the Passion including a grand choral movement.

=== Chronology ===
Bach was Thomaskantor in Leipzig from late May 1723 until his death in 1750. The Passion music he programmed for the Good Friday services is largely documented. The St Matthew Passion, with its double choir and orchestra, was most likely written for the St. Thomas Church while it had two organ lofts, although Bach later also produced a version where the continuo instrument of the second choir was a harpsichord (instead of organ), so that a performance in St. Nicolas (with only one organ) was possible.

Bach's first Passion presentation, the St John Passion of 1724, led to his first documented conflict with the Leipzig Town Council. Because of the bad state of the organ loft and its instruments (the organ and an harpsichord), Bach did not want to stage his St John Passion in St. Nicolas, despite it being the turn of that church to host the Good Friday service. Having announced the plan, sharp communications between Bach and the official bodies of the town ensued, with Bach having announcements printed that the service was going to be held at St. Thomas. Ultimately the Town Council decided to pay for emergency reparations at St. Nicolas, and for a reprint of the announcements where the service was announced for St. Nicolas.

- 1724 (April 7): St John Passion, 1st version.
- 1725 (March 30): St John Passion, 2nd version.
- 1726 (April 19): Jesus Christus ist um unsrer Missetat willen verwundet, with additional chorales composed by Bach.
- 1727 (April 11): St Matthew Passion, BWV 244b.
- 1728 (March 26): (?) St John Passion, 3rd version.
- 1729 (April 15): St Matthew Passion, BWV 244b.
- 1730 (April 7): St Luke Passion, BWV 246.
- 1731 (March 23): St Mark Passion, BWV 247.
- 1732 (April 11): (?) St John Passion, 3rd version.
- 1733 (April 3): no Passion performed due to the Saxon mourning period following the death of Augustus II the Strong.
- 1734 (April 23): Stölzel's passion-oratorio Ein Lämmlein geht und trägt die Schuld.
- 1735 (April 8): St Luke Passion, BWV 246.
- 1736 (March 30): St Matthew Passion, revised version (BWV 244).
- 1739 (March 27): (?) Telemann's Brockes Passion, TWV 5:1.
- 1742 (March 23): St Matthew Passion, revised version (BWV 244).
- 1744 (March 27): St Mark Passion, BWV 247 (revised version).
- 1745 (April 16): (?) St Luke Passion, BWV 246 (revised version).
- after 1745: (?) Wer ist der, so von Edom kömmt, pasticcio containing some movements by Bach.
- 1746 (April 8): George Frideric Handel's Brockes Passion, HWV 48.
- 1747 (March 31) or 1748 (April 12): pasticcio Passion oratorio based on Jesus Christus ist um unsrer Missetat willen verwundet with seven arias from Handel's Brockes Passion.
- 1749 (April 4): St John Passion, 4th version.
- 1750 (March 27): St John Passion, 4th version. (probably led by Prefect)

== Sources ==
- Glöckner, Andreas (2009). "Ein weiterer Kantatenjahrgang Gottfried Heinrich Stölzels in Bachs Aufführungsrepertoire?" [Is there another cantata cycle by Gottfried Heinrich Stölzel that belonged to Bach’s performance repertoire?]. In Wollny, Peter (ed.). Bach-Jahrbuch 2009 [Bach Yearbook 2009]. Bach-Jahrbuch (in German). Vol. 95. Neue Bachgesellschaft. Leipzig: Evangelische Verlagsanstalt. pp. 95–115. doi:10.13141/bjb.v2009. ISBN 978-3-374-02749-1. ISSN 0084-7682.
- Schabalina, Tatjana (2008). "Texte zur Music in Sankt Petersburg: Neue Quellen zur Leipziger Musikgeschichte sowie zur Kompositions- und Aufführungstätigkeit Johann Sebastian Bachs" [Texte zur Music in Saint Petersburg: New sources on Leipzig's music history, including on Johann Sebastian Bach's compositional and performatory practices]. In Wollny, Peter (ed.). Bach-Jahrbuch 2008 [Bach Yearbook 2008]. Bach-Jahrbuch (in German). Vol. 94. Neue Bachgesellschaft. Leipzig: Evangelische Verlagsanstalt. pp. 99–122. doi:10.13141/bjb.v2008. ISBN 978-3-374-02668-5. ISSN 0084-7682.
- Daniel R. Melamed. Hearing Bach's Passions. Oxford University Press, 2005. ISBN 9780195347036
