= Funeral Anthem for Queen Caroline =

1737 anthem by George Frideric Handel

George Frideric Handel

The Funeral Anthem for Queen Caroline, HWV 264, is an anthem by George Frideric Handel. It was composed and first performed for the funeral of Caroline of Ansbach (Note: Queen of Great Britain and Ireland, being the wife of King George II.) at Westminster Abbey on 17 December 1737. Handel slightly re-worked the anthem and used it for the opening section of his oratorio Israel in Egypt in 1739. The theme of the first chorus was taken by Mozart as the theme for the Requiem aeternam movement of his Requiem Mass. The anthem is approximately forty minutes in length.

== Background ==
Queen Caroline, consort of George II, had been friend and patron to Handel for more than thirty years when she died in 1737. An accomplished amateur musician herself, Caroline took a lively interest in artistic and intellectual matters, and was widely mourned at her death. Handel was commissioned to compose music for her funeral, using text provided to him by Edward Willes that drew from the Lamentations and Job. At the funeral, according to contemporary accounts, "…the great Bells of the Cathedral of St. Paul and of many Churches in London and Westminster were tolled. And the Tower Guns kept firing all the while, at a Minute’s Distance between each". Handel's anthem was performed in Westminster Abbey by "near 80 vocal performers and 100 instrumental from His Majesty’s band, and from the Opera, etc." The Duke of Chandos, Handel's former patron, wrote of the anthem "the composition was exceedingly fine, and adapted very properly to the melancholy occasion."

== Scoring ==
The anthem is written for four vocal soloists, soprano, alto, tenor and bass, a mixed choir and orchestra of strings, two oboes, and continuo instruments.

== Text ==
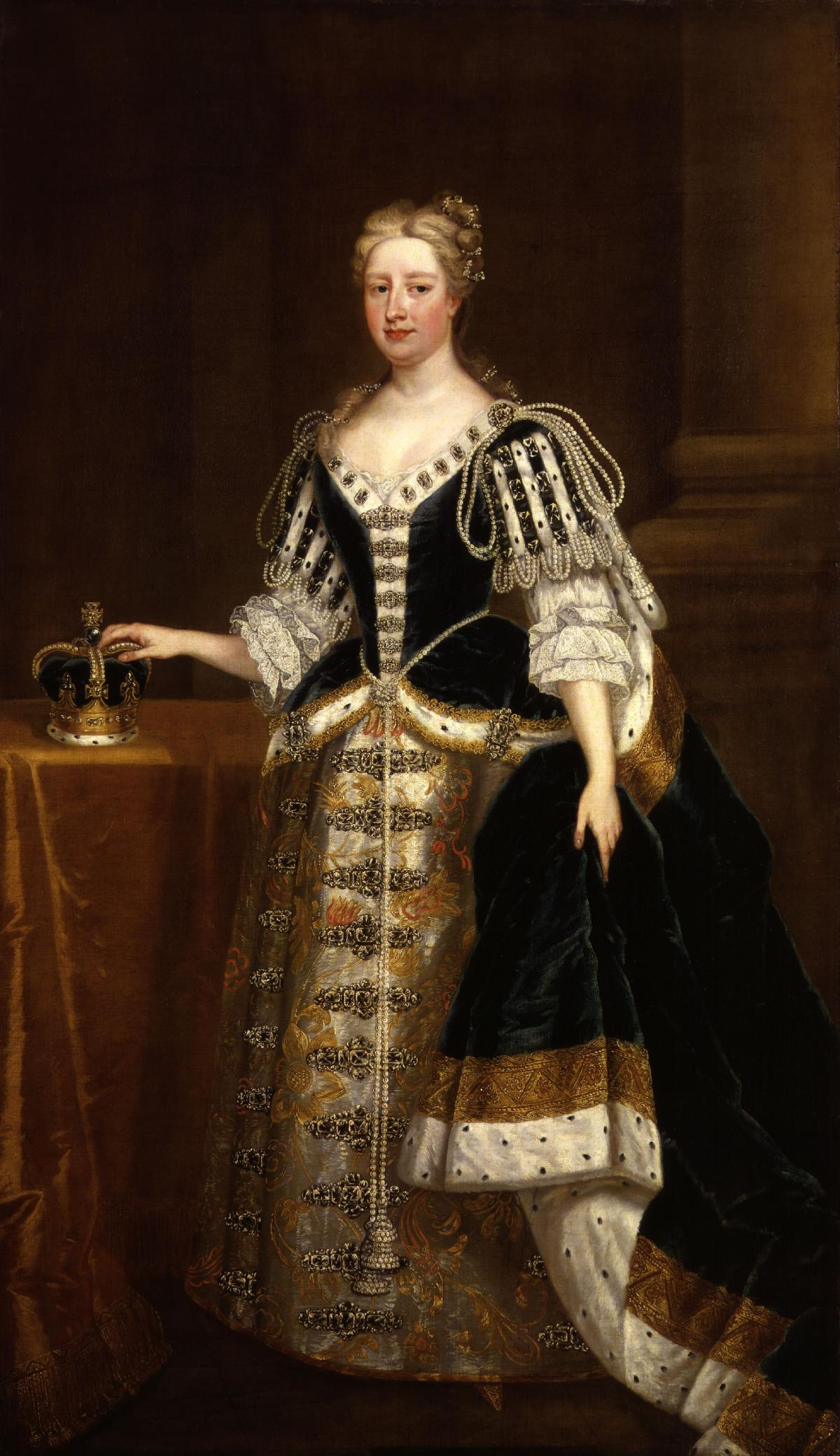
Queen Caroline, painted by Charles Jervas in 1727

Sinfonia

Chorus:

The ways of Zion do mourn and she is in bitterness. (Lamentations 1:4); all her people sigh (Lamentations 1:11) and hang down their heads to the ground (Lamentations 2:10).

Chorus:

How are the mighty fall’n (Samuel 2, 1:19). She that was great among the nations and princess of the provinces! (Lamentations 1:1).

Chorus:

She put on righteousness and it clothed her; her judgment was a robe and a diadem (Job 29:14).

Soli & Chorus:

When the ear heard her, then it blessed her, and when the eye saw her, it gave witness of her (Job 29:11).

Chorus:

How are the mighty fall’n (Samuel 2, 1:19). She that was great, great among the nations, and princess of the provinces! (Lamentations 1:1)

Chorus:

She delivered the poor that cried, the fatherless and him that had none to help him (Job 29:12). Kindness, meekness and comfort were her tongue (Sirach 36:23); if there was any virtue, and if there was any praise, she thought on those things (Philippians 4:8).

Chorus:

How are the mighty fall’n (Samuel 2, 1:19). She that was great, great among the nations, and princess of the provinces! (Lamentations 1:1)

Soli & Chorus:

The righteous shall be had in everlasting remembrance (Psalms 112:6) and the wise will shine as the brightness of the firmament (Daniel 12:3).

Chorus:

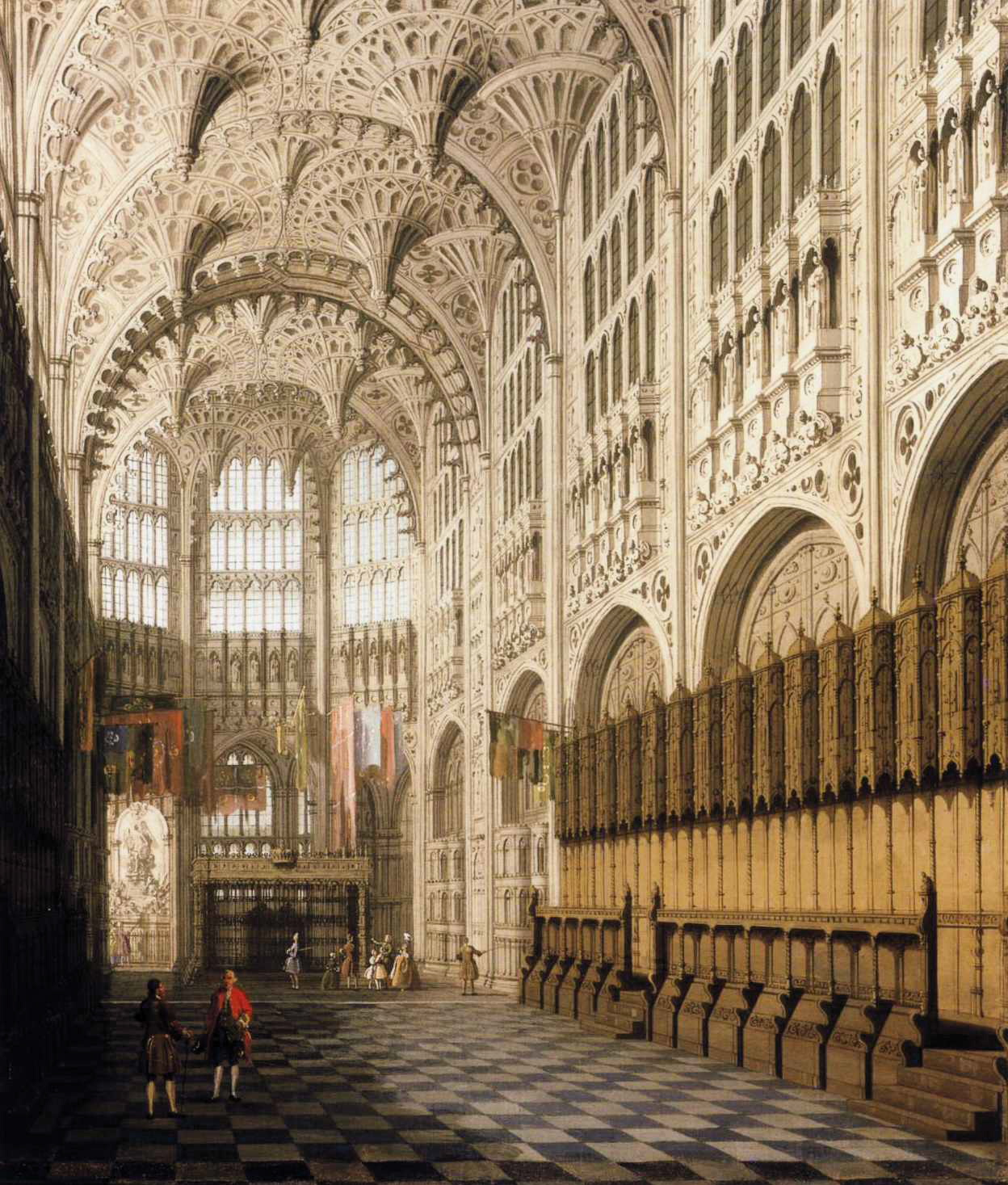
Canaletto - The Interior of Westminster Abbey, where the Funeral Anthem for Queen Caroline was first performed

Their bodies are buried in peace; but their name liveth evermore (Sirach 44:13).

Chorus:

The people will tell of their wisdom and the congregation will shew forth their praise (Sirach 44:14); their reward also is with the Lord and the care of them is with the Most high (Wisdom of Solomon 5:15).

Soli:

They shall receive a glorious kingdom and a beautiful crown from the Lord’s hand (Wisdom of Solomon 5:16).

Chorus:

The merciful goodness of the Lord endureth for ever on them that fear him and his righteousness on children’s children (Psalm 103:17).

== Musical features ==
The anthem begins with a chorus that recalls the chorales used in the Lutheran church services Handel attended and composed music for as a young man. The musical material is developed contrapuntally and ends in an impressive fugue. Tender choruses "When the ear heard her" and "She delivered the poor", expressing the Queen's gentle character, alternate with repeated and powerful choral interjections of "How are the mighty fall'n." The work comes to a quiet conclusion. Musical historian and Handel's first biographer, Charles Burney, ranked "The Funeral Anthem of Queen Caroline" as the finest of all Handel's compositions.

The chorus "Their bodies are buried in peace" quotes the music of Jacob Handl's setting of Ecce quomodo moritur justus.
