= Šentviška Gora =

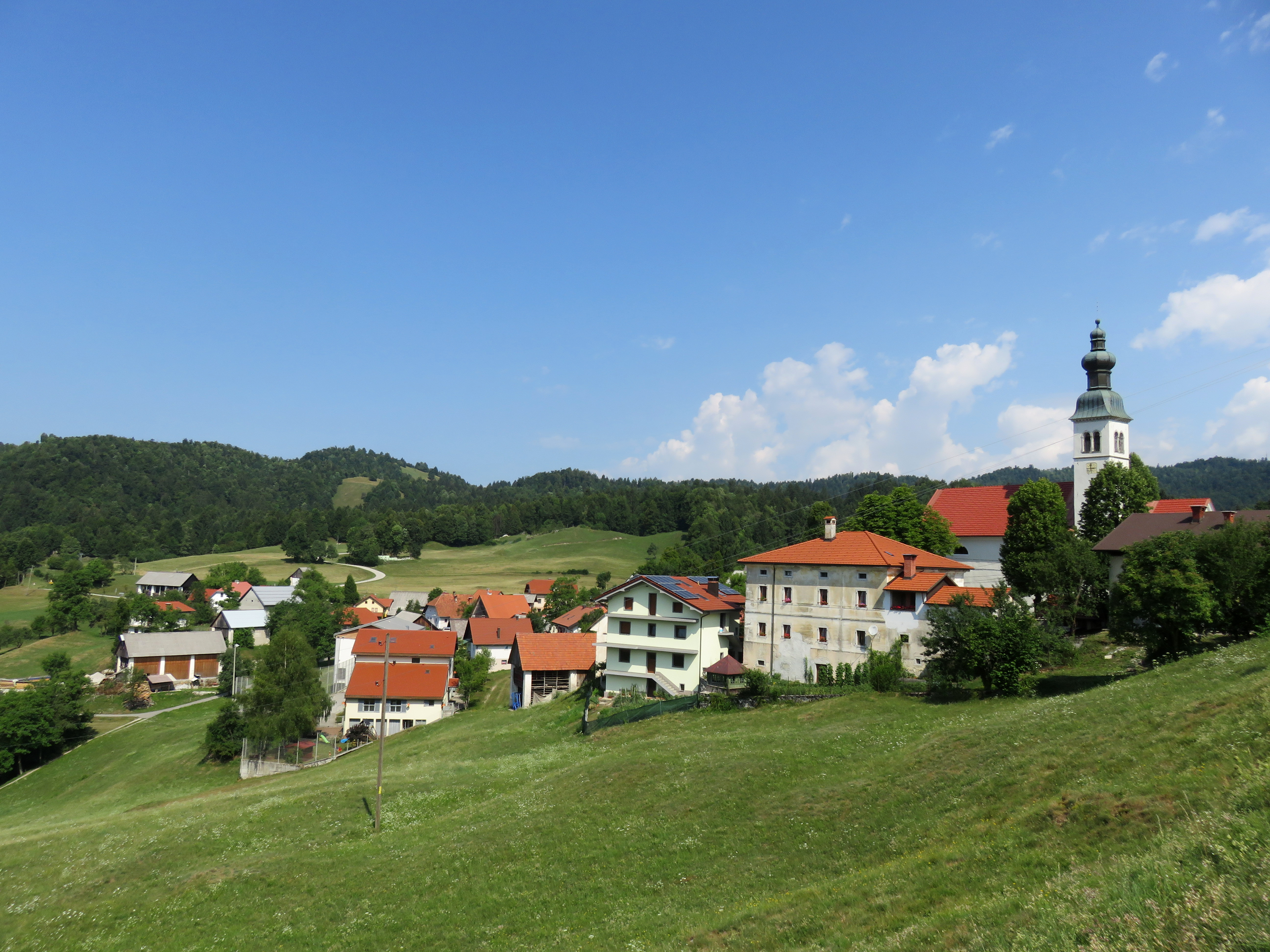

- Location in Slovenia
- Coordinates: 46°7′3″N 13°52′5.86″E
- Country: Slovenia
- Traditional region: Slovenian Littoral
- Statistical region: Gorizia
- Municipality: Tolmin

Area
  - Total: 3.4 km^{2} (1.3 sq mi)
- Elevation: 624.5 m (2,049 ft)

Population (2002)
  - Total: 106

Šentviška Gora (pronounced [ʃɛnˈtʋiːʃka ˈɡɔːɾa] or [ʃən-], in older sources Svetoviška Gora, German: Sankt Veitsberg) is the main settlement in the hills between the valleys of the Bača and Idrijca rivers, known as the St. Vitus Plateau (Slovene: Šentviška planota) or Šentviška Gora Plateau (Šentviškogorska planota), in the Municipality of Tolmin in the Littoral region of Slovenia.

== Church ==
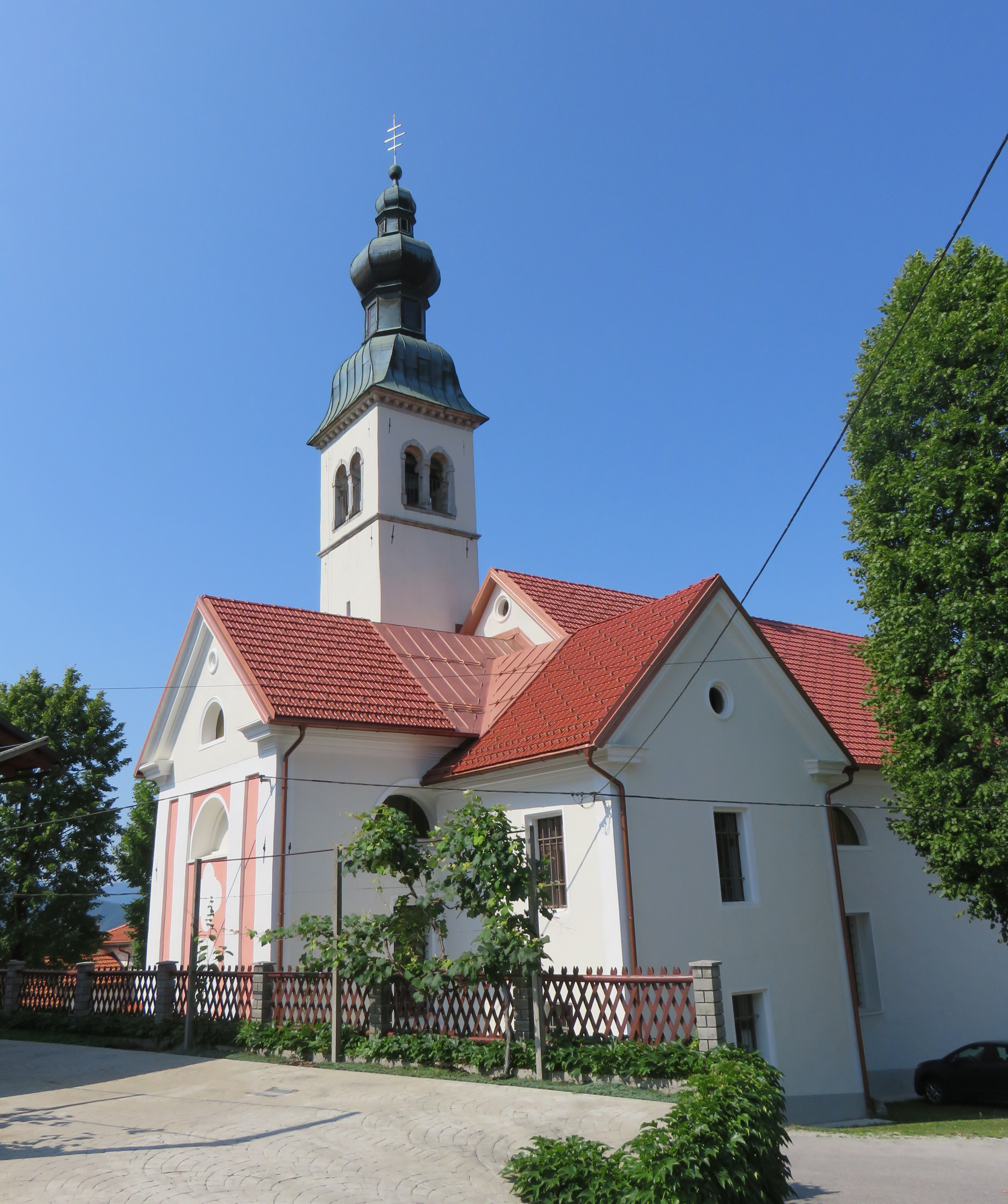
Saint Vitus's Church

The parish church, from which the settlement and the entire plateau gets its name, is dedicated to Saint Vitus and belongs to the Koper Diocese. It was first mentioned as the seat of the parish in documents dating to 1192, although the current building is Baroque in style. Its interior was painted in the early 20th century by Tone Kralj.

== Notable people ==
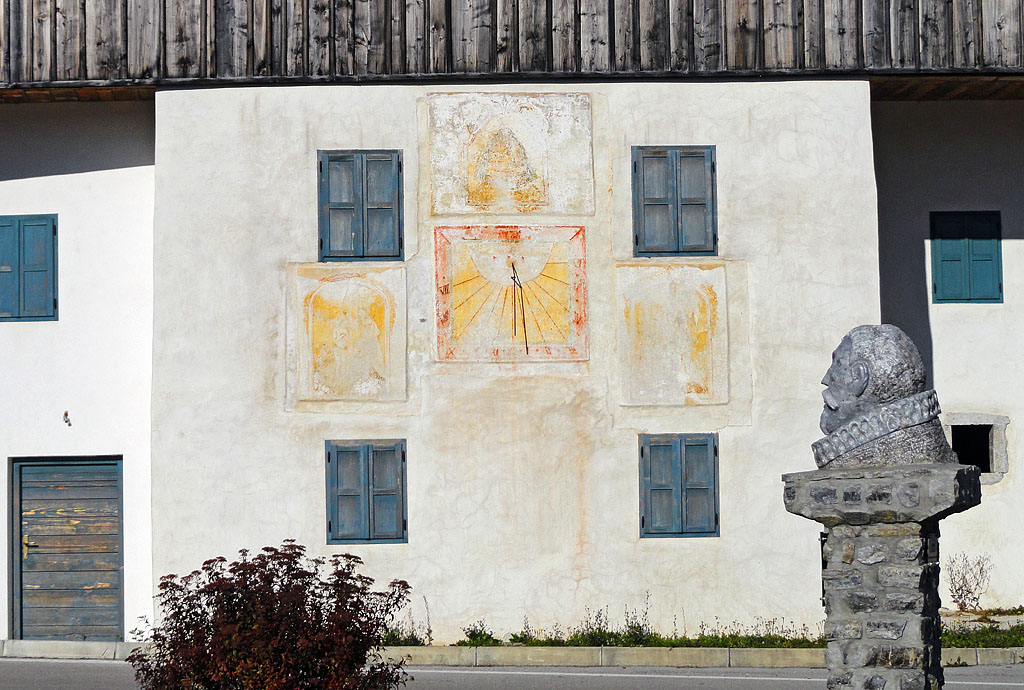
Statue of Jacobus Gallus in Šentviška Gora

Although he was probably born in Ribnica in southern Slovenia, a Slovene folk tradition claims Šentviška Gora as the birthplace of the composer Jacobus Gallus.
