= The righteous perishes =

Opening to the Book of Isaiah

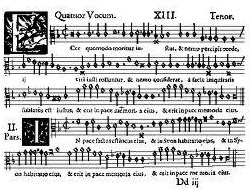
Tenor voice part of Jacob Handl's Ecce quomodo moritur iustus: over a century after its publication "for use in the Catholic Church" ("Catholicae Ecclesiae vsv") it was a well-known Protestant funeral motet.

The righteous perishes are the words with which the 57th chapter of the Book of Isaiah start. In Christianity, Isaiah 57:1–2 is associated with the death of Christ, leading to liturgical use of the text at Tenebrae: the 24th responsory for Holy Week, "Ecce quomodo moritur justus" (See how the just dies), is based on this text. More generally, the text is associated with the death of loved ones and is used at burials. As such, and in other versions and translations, the Bible excerpt has been set to music.

== Text ==
Isaiah 57:1–2 shifts between singular and plural, contrasting a group whom the prophetic tradition approves and others who are strongly condemned.

^{1} The righteous perishes,
And no man takes it to heart;
Merciful men are taken away,
While no one considers
That the righteous is taken away from evil.
^{2} He shall enter into peace;
They shall rest in their beds,
Each one walking in his uprightness.

- "The righteous" (KJV, NASB, NIV, NKJV, NLT, NRSV): or "the just man" (NAB); "Good people" (TEV); "The godly" (NET Bible).
- "Evil" or "the face of evil"

These verses complain the (apparently violent) death of the righteous that went 'unnoticed and unlamented'.

== Responsory "Ecce quomodo moritur justus" ==
"Ecce quomodo moritur justus", in the pre-Vatican II Catholic Church the 24th of 27 Tenebrae responsories, or the sixth responsory for Holy Saturday, is based on Isaiah 57:1–2. In the Tenebrae service of the Holy Week this responsory is preceded by a reading taken from Saint Augustine's Commentary on Psalm 64 (63) § 13, interpreting Psalms 64:8 (Vulgate Ps. 63:9 – "Their own tongues shall ruin them") in the light of Matthew 28:12–13 (the soldiers at Jesus' grave bribed to lie about the whereabouts of the corpse). The Versus of the responsory derives from Isaiah 53:7–8.

Vulgate

From Isaias 57:1–2:
iustus perit
et nemo est qui recogitet in corde suo
et viri misericordiae colliguntur
quia non est qui intellegat
a facie enim malitiae collectus est iustus
veniat pax requiescat in cubili suo
qui ambulavit in directione sua.
From Isaias 53:7–8:
quasi agnus coram tondente obmutescet
et non aperiet os suum
de angustia et de iudicio sublatus est

Responsory

Responsorium:
Ecce quomodo moritur justus
et nemo percipit corde:
et viri justi tolluntur
et nemo considerat.
A facie iniquitatis sublatus est justus
et erit in pace memoria eius.

Versus:
Tamquam agnus coram tondente se obmutuit
et non aperuit os suum
de angustia et de judicio sublatus est.

Translation

Responsorium:
Behold how the just man dies,
and nobody takes it to heart;
and just men are taken away,
and nobody considers it.
The just man is taken away from the face of iniquity,
and his memory shall be in peace.

Versus:
He was dumb as a lamb before his shearer,
and opened not his mouth;
he was taken away from distress, and from judgment.

Settings of the responsory are included in Tomás Luis de Victoria's Officium Hebdomadae Sanctae, Carlo Gesualdo's Responsoria et alia ad Officium Hebdomadae Sanctae spectantia, Jan Dismas Zelenka's Responsoria pro hebdomada sancta (ZWV 55) and Franz Liszt's Responsorien und Antiphonen (S.30).

A 16th century motet by Marc'Antonio Ingegneri on the Latin text was published around 1967 in an arrangement by Maynard Klein and with "Behold how the righteous perish" as English translation. Palestrina set the responsory for two sopranos, alto and choir.

Jacob Handl (Jacobus Gallus) published his setting of Ecce quomodo moritur justus as No. VIII under the heading "De Passione Domini Nostri Iesv Christi" (On the Passion of Jesus Christ our Lord) in his Opus Musicum II. The subtitle of the 1587 publication reads "Qvae Ex Sancto Catholicae Ecclesiae Vsv Ita Svnt Dispositae, vt omni tempore inseruire queant" (Which are herewith offered for use in the Catholic Church, in such fashion that they can be adopted throughout the liturgical year). The Versus in Handl's setting is different from the Versus of the 24th Tenebrae responsory.

Versus (Handl's setting)

II. Pars.
In pace factus est locus ejus
et in Sion habitatio ejus.

Translation

Part II
His place is made in peace,
he resides in Sion.

As in 17th century France the Tenebrae services, including the Répons de ténèbres, were held at the vespers of the preceding evening, for example Marc-Antoine Charpentier's Ecce quomodo, H 131 is part of his Répons de ténèbres du Vendredi saint (Tenebrae responsories of Good Friday).

In the 18th century Georg Reutter produced a SATB setting of the responsory for the ceremonies of the Holy Week in the Wiener Hofburgkapelle (Vienna court chapel). Another SATB setting was composed by Franz Joseph Aumann, to which an accompaniment by three trombones was added by Bruckner in 1879.

In the 20th century Francis Poulenc included "Ecce quomodo moritur justus" as the last in his Sept répons des ténèbres, FP 181, composed 1961.

The Episcopal Church provides a single Tenebrae service on Wednesday evening, the day before Maundy Thursday. That service reduces the total number of Tenebrae lessons, each followed by a responsory, to nine. Ecce quomodo moritur is the sixth responsory, and it follows after a reading from Augustine's commentary on Psalm 55 (54).

== In Lutheranism ==
Isaiah 57:1–2 was a theme for funeral sermons of the Reformation, among others at a funeral service for Martin Luther in Eisleben. It also, along with Isaiah 53 and Isaiah 63: 1–3, was used in the context of the Passion story.

=== Handl's Ecce quomodo moritur justus ===
Jacob Handl's Ecce quomodo moritur justus motet was sung at Protestant burials in the 16th century. In 1682, Gottfried Vopelius published Handl's motet with a singable German translation ("Siehe, wie dahin stirbt der Gerechte") in the Neu Leipziger Gesangbuch, for performance on Good Friday. Handl's motet was performed on Good Friday in Protestant churches in Wrocław and Leipzig. The music of Handl's setting, by that time perceived as a Protestant funeral motet, is quoted in George Frideric Handel's Funeral Anthem for Queen Caroline, HWV 264.

=== Der Gerechte kömmt um ===
Der Gerechte kömmt um, a chorus appearing in a pasticcio Passion oratorio from the early 1750s, has a German version of Isaiah 57:1–2 as text. It is an arrangement attributed to Johann Sebastian Bach of a SSATB setting of Tristis est anima mea, a motet attributed to Johann Kuhnau. The arrangement may have been a stand-alone funeral motet.

== Sources ==
=== Bible quotes ===
- Vulgate: Isaias 57:1–2 and 53:7–8 at Wikisource.
- World English Bible (WEB): Isaiah 57:1–2 at Wikisource

=== Other ===
- Augustine of Hippo. Exposition on Psalm 64 (63). at www.newadvent.org
- Bach Digital. Der Gerechte kömmt um BWV deest; BC C 8 (= BC D 10/3)
- BnF. Répons de ténèbres du Vendredi saint. 6e répons. H 131 by Marc Antoine Charpentier
- Catholic Church The Complete Office of Holy Week According to the Roman Missal and Breviary, in Latin and English, pp. 400–401 Benziger brothers, 1875
- Church Publishing The Book of Occasional Services • 2003, pp. 74–83. New York, 2004. ISBN 089869664X ISBN 9780898696646
- Clifford Bartlett (editor). George Frideric Handel: Israel in Egypt Part I – The Ways of Zion do Mourn Carus Verlag No. 55.264, 2008.
- Coggins, R (2007). "22. Isaiah". In Barton, John; Muddiman, John (eds.). The Oxford Bible Commentary (first (paperback) ed.). Oxford University Press. pp. 433–486. ISBN 978-0199277186.
- Coogan, Michael David (2007). Coogan, Michael David; Brettler, Marc Zvi; Newsom, Carol Ann; Perkins, Pheme (eds.). The New Oxford Annotated Bible with the Apocryphal/Deuterocanonical Books: New Revised Standard Version, Issue 48 (Augmented 3rd ed.). Oxford University Press. ISBN 9780195288810.
- CPDL. Ecce quomodo moritur justus by Jacob Handl at Choral Public Domain Library (ChoralWiki)
- Jacobus Gallus (Jacob Handl). Opus Musicum II (Secvndvs Tomvs. Mvsici Operis, Harmoniarvm Qvatvor, Qvinqve, Sex, Octo Et Plvrivm Vocvm : Qvae Ex Sancto Catholicae Ecclesiae Vsv Ita Svnt Dispositae, vt omni tempore inseruire queant. Ad Dei Opt: Max: laudem, et Ecclesiae sanctae decus / Avthore Iacobo Hándl / Pragae, Typis Nigrinianis. Anno M.D.LXXXVII). Georgius Nigrinus, Prague, 1587.
- Carlo Gesualdo. Ecce quomodo moritur justus (1611): Scores at the International Music Score Library Project
- Harold Gleason, Warren Becker, Catherine Gleason. Music in the Middle Ages and Renaissance, p. 174. Alfred Music Publishing, 1988. ISBN 0882843796 ISBN 9780882843797
- Prosper Guéranger, translated by Laurence Shepherd. Passiontide and Holy Week, Volume VI of The Liturgical Year, pp. 533–534. Dublin, 1870.
- Jacob Handl (Jacobus Gallus). Ecce, quomodo moritur iustus by Jacob Handl: Scores at the International Music Score Library Project
- Uwe Harten, Anton Bruckner. Ein Handbuch. Residenz Verlag, Salzburg, 1996. ISBN 3-7017-1030-9.
- Tomasz Jeż. "The Motets of Jacob Handl in Inter-confessional Silesian Liturgical Practice" in De musica disserenda III/2, 2007, pp. 37–48
- Reinhold Kainhofer (editor). Ecce quomodo moritur by Georg Reutter. Vienna: Edition Kainhofer, 2009.
- Maynard Klein. Behold how the righteous perish : motet / Marco Ingegneri ; arr. Maynard Klein ; English text, M.K. at the website of the National Library of Australia
- Franz Liszt. Sabbato sancto, Respons. VI in Responsorien und Antiphonen (S.30 – composed 1860, published 1936): Scores at the International Music Score Library Project
- Elsie Anne McKee. Katharina Schütz Zell. 1. The life and thought of a sixteenth-century reformer, p. 127. BRILL, 1999. ISBN 9004111255 ISBN 9789004111257
- Melamed, Daniel R. (1995). J.S. Bach and the German Motet. Cambridge University Press. pp. 148–149. ISBN 0-52-141864-X.
- Morton, Wyant (1992). Questions of authenticity in three motets attributed to Johann Sebastian Bach (Thesis) (PDF). University of Arizona.
- Giovanni Pierluigi da Palestrina. Ecce, quomodo moritur: Scores at the International Music Score Library Project
- Melvin P. Unger. Historical Dictionary of Choral Music, p. 175. Scarecrow Press, 2010. ISBN 0810873923 ISBN 9780810873926
- Tomás Luis de Victoria Ecce quomodo moritur justus (1585): Scores at the International Music Score Library Project
- Carl Ferdinand Wilhelm Walther. Sermons and prayers for Reformation and Luther commemorations, p. 161. Joel Baseley, 2008. ISBN 0982252323 ISBN 9780982252321
- Jan Dismas Zelenka Ecce quomodo at www.carus-verlag.com
