= Wer ist der, so von Edom kömmt =

Pasticcio Passion oratorio

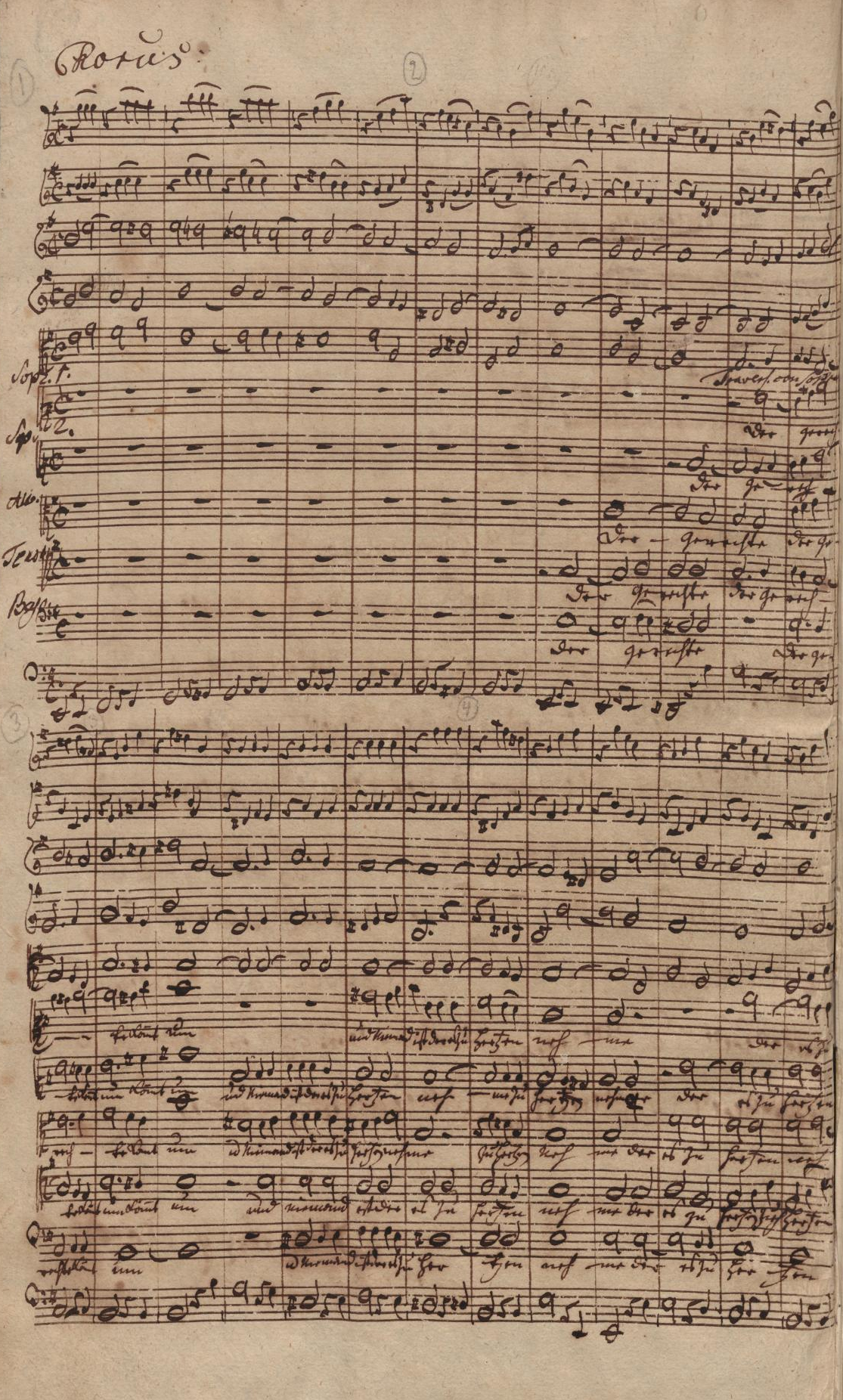
First page of "Der Gerechte kömmt um," p. 39v in the D-B Mus.ms. 8155 manuscript

Wer ist der, so von Edom kömmt is a pasticcio Passion oratorio based on compositions by Carl Heinrich Graun, Georg Philipp Telemann, Johann Sebastian Bach and others. The pasticcio was assembled around 1750.

The only extant manuscript of the Pasticcio was written by Johann Christoph Farlau and an unknown scribe. Farlau was a pupil of Johann Christoph Altnickol, Bach's son-in-law. Since a reliable differentiation between the handwriting of the master and the pupil was only done in the early 21st century, older scholarship generally attributes the realisation of the Pasticcio to Altnickol and/or indicates Altnickol as the composer of the movements that can not be attributed to other composers.

In the second half of the 20th century Bach scholarship turned its attention to the pasticcio as it was possibly Bach's elusive "5th Passion", and for containing previously unknown work by the composer (BC D 10).

== History ==
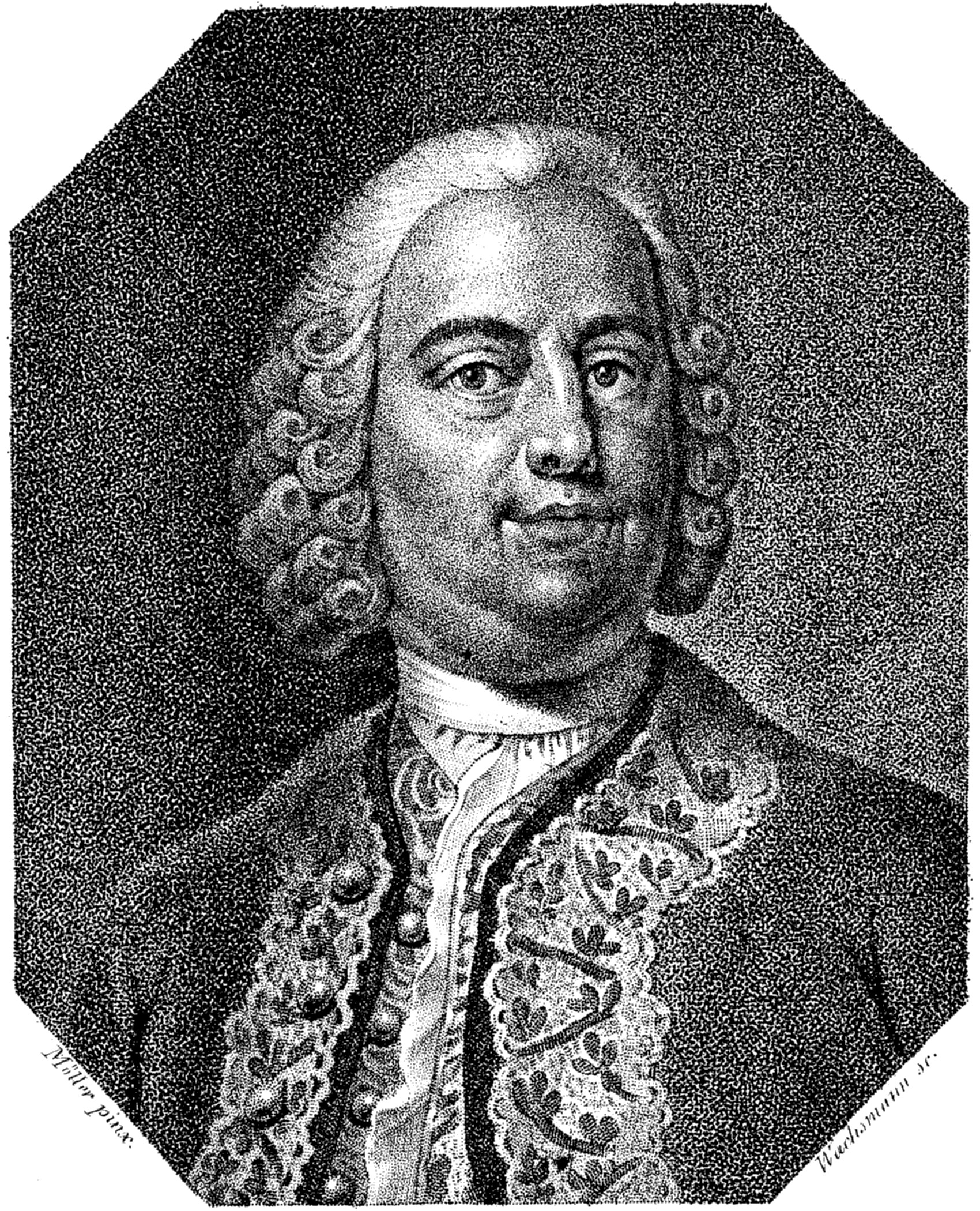
Carl Heinrich Graun (1703–1759)

The backbone of the Wer ist der, so von Edom kömmt pasticcio is Ein Lämmlein geht und trägt die Schuld, a Passion cantata by Carl Heinrich Graun: 31 of the pasticcio's 42 movements derive from this composition. The first two movements of the pasticcio are choral movements composed by Telemann. Three movements are linked to Bach. For the remaining six movements no composer is known.

The text authors of the pasticcio and its components are largely unknown, apart from those of the Lutheran hymn texts, for instance Paul Gerhardt's "O Haupt voll Blut und Wunden" (movement 18), and Michael Weiße's "Christus, der uns selig macht" (movements 2, 24, 27, 30, 38, 40 and 42). For the free verse no librettist is known. There is no direct quote from the Gospel's Passion texts: the Passion's story isn't told by an Evangelist role in recitatives, nor in direct speech by any of its characters such as a vox Christi or turba choruses, but exclusively hinted at by the reflective texts of the free verse and the chorales. Closest to a Passion narrative in this sense are the interspersed stanzas of "Christus, der uns selig macht", which recall successive scenes of Christ's Passion. Other Biblical models can be indicated for some of the lyrics, for instance Isaiah 57:1–2 ("The righteous perishes") for the Bach-movement No. 39, which for its German text uses the Luther Bible translation.

=== Ein Lämmlein geht und trägt die Schuld, GraunWV B:VII:4 ===
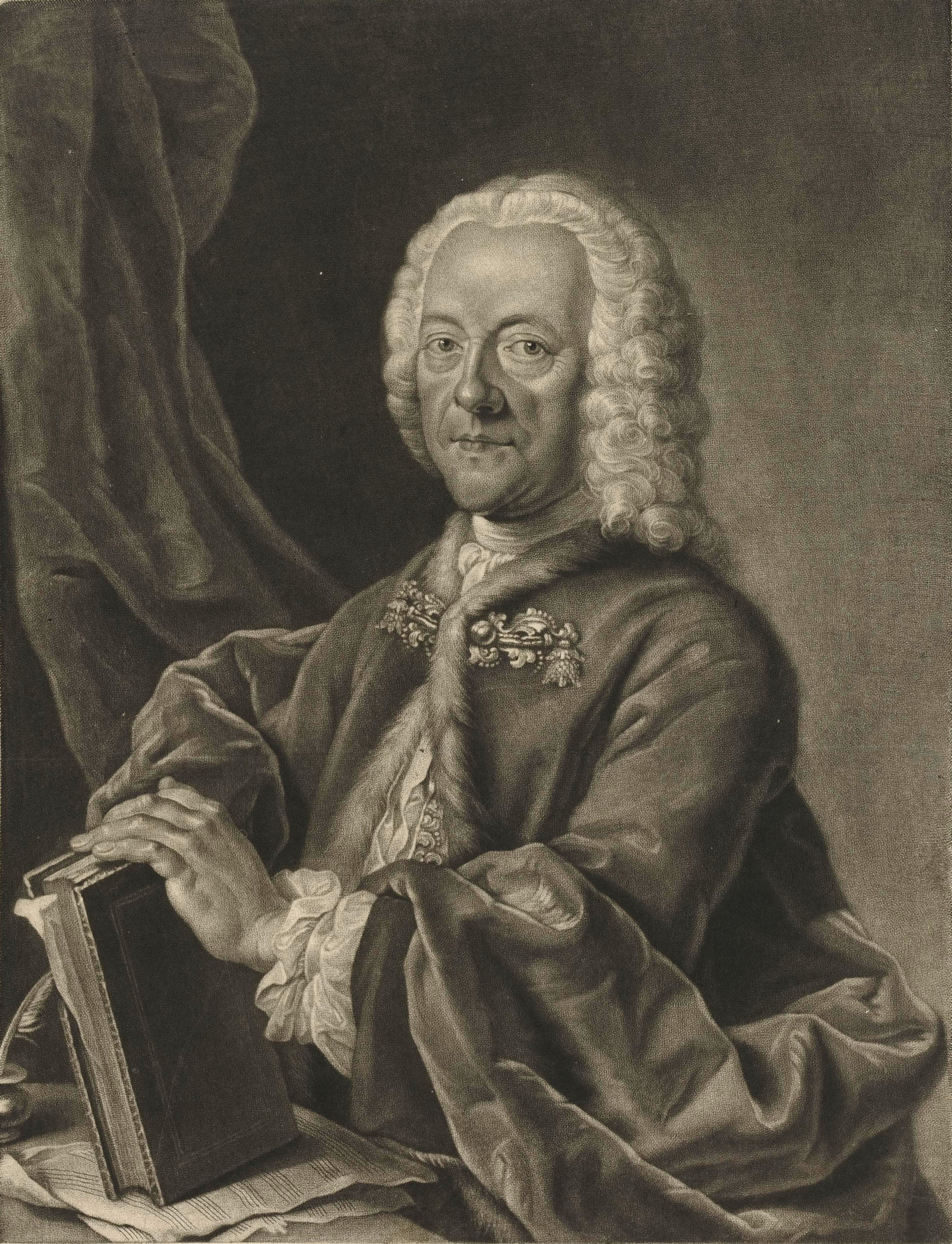
Georg Philipp Telemann (1681–1767)

Movements 2–31 and 33 of Graun's Passion cantata Ein Lämmlein geht und trägt die Schuld, GraunWV B:VII:4, reappear in the pasticcio as movements 3–18, 21–23, 25–26, 28–29, 31–37 and 41.

Graun's Passion cantata was composed in Braunschweig between 1725 and 1735, and was popular and widely spread for over a century after its composition.

=== Telemann ===
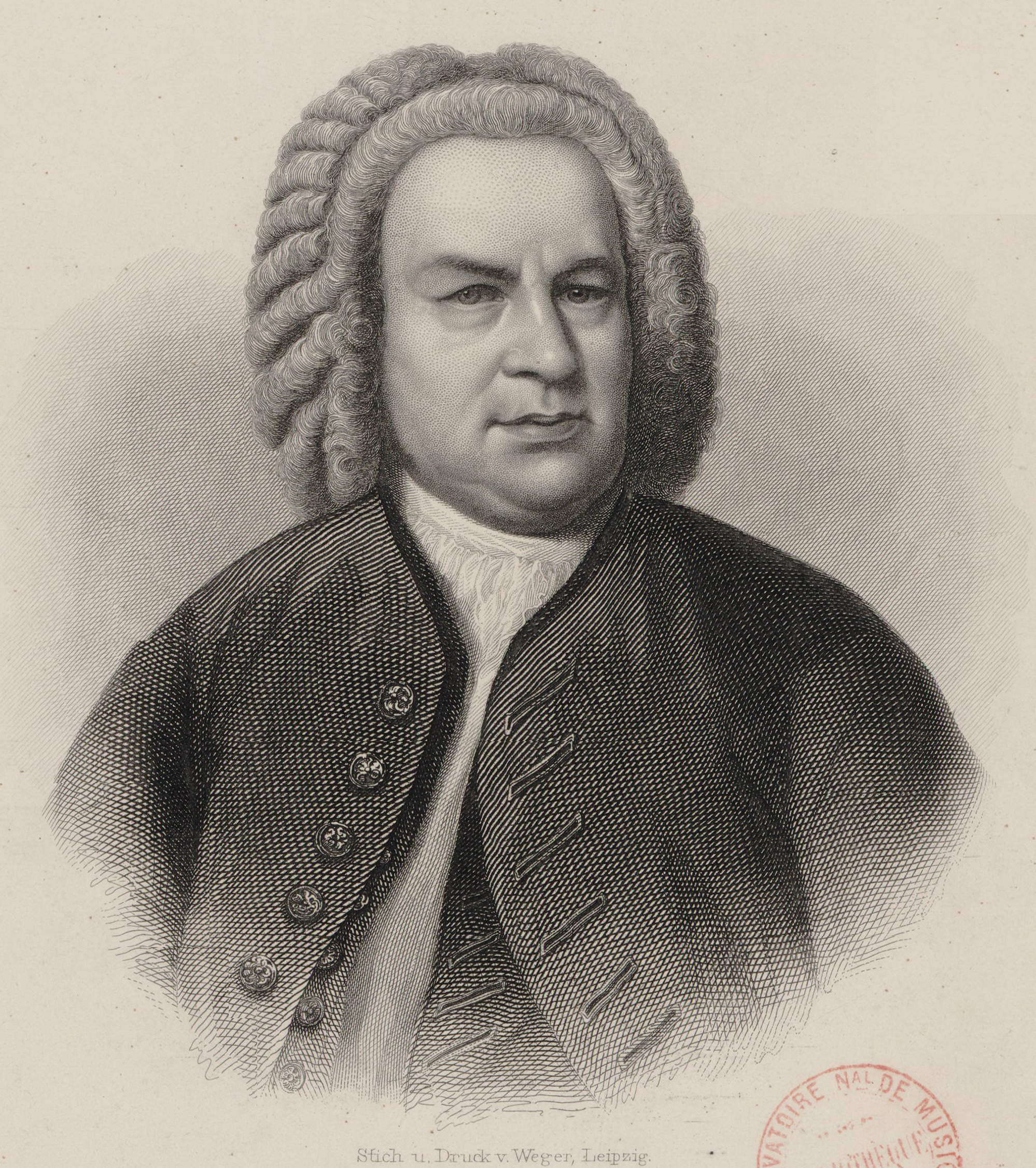
Johann Sebastian Bach (1685–1750)

The opening chorus "Wer ist der, so von Edom kömmt" and the ensuing chorale "Christus, der uns selig macht" are the first and last movements of Telemann's cantata Wer ist der, so von Edom kommt, TWV 1:1585, which was composed for Palm Sunday 1722 in Frankfurt.

=== Bach ===
Movements 19, 20 and 39 of the pasticcio are linked to Bach, the last of these three movements also to Bach's predecessor in Leipzig, Johann Kuhnau. In the Bach Compendium these three movements are given the number D 10.

==== "Herr Jesu Christ, wahr' Mensch und Gott", BWV 127/1 (variant) ====
The opening chorus of Bach's cantata Herr Jesu Christ, wahr' Mensch und Gott, BWV 127 appears revised, and transposed to E-flat major, as the 19th movement in the Pasticcio. The original cantata was first performed on Estomihi Sunday (the last Sunday before Lent), 11 February 1725 in Leipzig.

==== Arioso "So heb ich denn mein Auge sehnlich auf", BWV 1088 ====
The arioso for bass voice "So heb ich denn mein Auge sehnlich auf" is the 20th movement of the pasticcio. In the second half of the 20th century it was attributed to Bach on stylistic grounds, and added as one of the Nachträge (later additions) to the Bach-Werke-Verzeichnis, under the number 1088. In BWV^{2a} (1998) it was added to the 4th chapter (Passions and Oratorios).

==== "Der Gerechte kömmt um", BC C 8 ====
"Der Gerechte kömmt um", the 39th movement of the pasticcio, is an arrangement for SSATB chorus and instrumental ensemble of the Tristis est anima mea motet attributed to Kuhnau. The arrangement is attributed to Bach, and may have been used, in Bach's time in Leipzig, as a funeral motet. 20th-century editions of the Bach-Werke-Verzeichnis don't list this setting of Isaiah 57:1–2 (i.e., BWV deest): in the Bach Compendium it is known as D 10/3 (as part of the pasticcio) or C 8 (as a separate motet). In the 21st century the separate motet is mentioned as BWV 1149.

=== Other movements and realisation of the pasticcio ===
Movements 24, 27, 30, 38, 40 and 42 of the pasticcio are chorale settings of the second and fourth to eighth verse of the hymn "Christus, der uns selig macht", the first verse of which had appeared in Telemann's setting in the second movement of the pasticcio. The composer of these six movements is unknown, but often assumed to be Altnickol.

The only extant manuscript of the pasticcio originated between 1755 and 1759. Where or when it may have been performed in the 18th century is not known. Who assembled the pasticcio is also not known, but presumably someone in the circle of Bach and/or Altnickol. It is even deemed possible that Bach assembled the pasticcio in the 1740s for a performance in Leipzig (the Passion is in two parts as required for Leipzig Passion performances).

== Scoring and structure ==
Wer ist der, so von Edom kömmt is set for soprano (s), alto (a), tenor (t) and bass (b) vocal soloists, and a choir consisting of two soprano parts (S), altos (A), tenors (T) and basses (B). The second soprano choral part only appears in the Bach-movement No. 39. The bass and the soprano vocal soloists sing together with the chorus in the opening movement and in the 34th movement respectively.

The orchestra consists of a basso continuo (Bc), playing in all movements, and a string section (Str), with two violin parts (Vl) and a viola part, playing in most movements. In the tutti movements No. 19 and No. 34 two traversos (Fl) and two oboes (Ob) join the strings and continuo. The traversos also accompany the soprano 1 part in No. 39. Two Oboe d'amore players are required for Aria No. 10 only. Bach-movement No. 20 has two unspecified low instruments: the parts can be played by violoncellos (Vc) or bassoons (Bas).

The first part of the Passion oratorio starts with the two Telemann movements, followed by 16 Graun movements, the last of which, a setting of the "O Haupt voll Blut und Wunden" hymn, concludes the first part. The second part (Nos. 19–42) starts with the first two Bach-movements, followed by further Graun movements interspersed with six stanzas of the "Christus, der uns selig macht" hymn, and as No. 39 the third Bach-movement. Both parts of the Passion-oratorio start with a chorus, and end with a chorale. The choir participates in 19 movements, ten of which are chorale settings.

Soprano, alto and tenor each have three arias. Movement No. 21 is a duet for soprano and alto. The soprano soloist also sings in the tutti movement with chorus No. 34. The bass singer has an aria and an arioso, and sings with the chorus in the opening movement. There are eleven recitatives, some of which with continuo accompaniment exclusively, to be divided among the soprano, alto and tenor soloists.

Movements of the Passion pasticcio Wer ist der, so von Edom kömmt(green:) From Graun's Ein Lämmlein geht und trägt die Schuld, GraunWV B:VII:4(yellow:) From Telemann's Wer ist der, so von Sodom kommt, TWV 1:1585(orange-brown:) Bach-movements (BC D 10)
No.	type	voices	instr.	incipit	model
1.	Chorus	bSATB	2Ob Str Bc	Wer ist der, so von Edom kömmt	TWV 1:1585/1
2.	Chorale	SATB	Str Bc	Christus, der uns selig macht	TWV 1:1585/5
3.	Chorus	SATB	Str Bc	Führwar, er trug unsre Krankheit	GraunWV B:VII:4/2
4.	Recitative	s	Str Bc	So steigt mein Jesus in Geduld	GraunWV B:VII:4/3
5.	Aria	s	2Fl Str Bc	Ihr Tropfen, fallt auf meine Brust	GraunWV B:VII:4/4
6.	Recitative	t	Bc	Ich weiß, was die ihr selbst gelassene Vernuft	GraunWV B:VII:4/5
7.	Chorus	SATB	Str Bc	Wir aber hielten ihn für den	GraunWV B:VII:4/6
8.	Chorale	SATB	Str Bc	Herzliebster Jesu, was hast du verbrochen	GraunWV B:VII:4/7
9.	Recitative	a [t?]	Bc	Da dich dein Jünger selbst verrät	GraunWV B:VII:4/8
10.	Aria	a	2Oba Str Bc	Was an Strafen ich verschuldet	GraunWV B:VII:4/9
11.	Chorus	SAB	2Ob Str Bc	Er ist um unserer Missetat willen verwundet	GraunWV B:VII:4/10
12.	Chorale	SATB	Str Bc	Du trägst die Strafe meiner Schuld	GraunWV B:VII:4/11
13.	Aria	t	2Fl Str Bc	Harte Marter, schwere Plagen	GraunWV B:VII:4/12
14.	Recitative	s	Bc	Jetzt werd ich stark durch Christi Leidenskampf	GraunWV B:VII:4/13
15.	Aria	s	Str Bc	Nimmst du die Kron der Dornen an	GraunWV B:VII:4/14
16.	Recitative	a	Bc	Ja, ja, es geh' mir wie es will	GraunWV B:VII:4/15
17.	Chorus	SATB	Str Bc	Er war der Allerverachteste und Unwerteste	GraunWV B:VII:4/16
18.	Chorale	SATB	Str Bc	O Haupt voll Blut und Wunden	GraunWV B:VII:4/17
19.	Chorus	SATB	2Fl 2Ob Str Bc	Herr Jesu Christ, wahr' Mensch und Gott	BC D 10/1; BWV 127/1 (var.)
20.	Arioso	b	2Vc [2Bas?] Bc	So heb ich denn mein Auge sehnlich auf	BC D 10/2; BWV 1088
21.	Duet	sa	Str Bc	Sollt' ich nicht auf Jesum sehen	GraunWV B:VII:4/18
22.	Recitative	s [a?]	Bc	Die Macht, so meinen Heiland leiden läßt	GraunWV B:VII:4/19
23.	Aria	a	Str Bc	Hier steht der Grund von meinem Glauben	GraunWV B:VII:4/20
24.	Chorale	SAB	Str Bc	In der ersten Tagestund	Christus, der uns selig macht, v.2
25.	Recitative	t	Bc	Der ungerechte Richter selbst	GraunWV B:VII:4/21
26.	Aria	t	Str Bc	Arme Seel, zerschlagnes Herz	GraunWV B:VII:4/22
27.	Chorale	SATB	Str Bc	Um sechs ward er nackt und bloß	Christus, der uns selig macht, v.4
28.	Recitative	a	Bc	Ja, ja, mein Heiland geht die Todesbahn	GraunWV B:VII:4/23
29.	Aria	a	Str Bc	Ich lose mit, mein köstlich Teil	GraunWV B:VII:4/24
30.	Chorale	SATB	Bc	Jesus schrie' zur neunten Stund'	Christus, der uns selig macht, v.5
31.	Recitative	t	Str Bc	Ich sehe meinen Jesum ganz verlassen	GraunWV B:VII:4/25
32.	Aria	t	Str Bc	Mich entseelt ein banger Schrecken	GraunWV B:VII:4/26
33.	Recitative	t	Bc	Jedoch mein Glaube stärkt sich wieder	GraunWV B:VII:4/27
34.	Chorus	sSATB	2Fl 2Ob Str Bc	Christus hat mit einem Opfer in Ewigkeit vollendet	GraunWV B:VII:4/28
35.	Aria	b	2Ob Str Bc	Nun darf ich mich nicht mehr entsetzen	GraunWV B:VII:4/29
36.	Recitative	s [t?]	Bc	Ist Jesus tot	GraunWV B:VII:4/30
37.	Aria	s	2Fl 2Vl Bc	Zerbrich nur, Macht und Pracht der Erden	GraunWV B:VII:4/31
38.	Chorale	SATB	Str Bc	Da man hat zur Vesperzeit	Christus, der uns selig macht, v.6
39.	Chorus	SSATB	2 Fl 2Ob Str Bc	Der Gerechte kömmt um	BC D 10/3; BC C 8; BWV 1149
40.	Chorale	SATB	Str Bc	Da der Tag sein Ende nahm	Christus, der uns selig macht, v.7
41.	Chorus	SATB	2Fl Str Bc	Zu meinem Heill, zur Glaubensstärke	GraunWV B:VII:4/33
42.	Chorale	SATB	Str Bc	O hilf Christe, Gottes Sohn	Christus, der uns selig macht, v.8

== Reception ==
In the 19th century, Karl Hermann Bitter described Graun's Ein Lämmlein geht und trägt die Schuld, and the Wer ist der, so von Edom kömmt Passion oratorio. In 1964 John W. Grubbs wrote a thesis about the pasticcio. His article about the Passion oratorio was published in the Bach-Jahrbuch of 1965. The pasticcio was recorded in 1990. In 1997 its score was published by Andreas Glöckner and Peter Wollny. In the 21st century Farlau instead of his teacher Altnickol was identified as one of the scribes of the only extant manuscript (copy) of the pasticcio – which made previous assumptions regarding Altnickol's involvement with the pasticcio somewhat less probable. On 17 June 2008 the pasticcio was performed at the Leipzig Bach Festival, conducted by David Timm.

=== Score editions ===
Friedrich Hofmeister Musikverlag published the score of the pasticcio in 1997 as Passionskantate "Wer ist der, so von Edom kömmt" (Pasticcio). The editors of this publication were Andreas Glöckner and Peter Wollny. In the New Bach Edition the three Bach movements appeared in Series I (Cantatas), Volume 41, edited by Andreas Glöckner.

The facsimile of the Farlau manuscript (D-B Mus. ms. 8155) is available on-line for instance at the website of the Berlin State Library and at the Bach Digital website.

=== Discography ===
In 1990 the pasticcio was recorded by Martina Lins (soprano), Ralf Popken (countertenor), Markus Brutscher (tenor), Hans-Georg Wimmer (bass), the Rheinische Kantorei and the Kleine Konzert, conducted by Hermann Max. The recording was released in 1991 by EMI, and re-issued in 2012. In the first half of 2019, Gotthold Schwarz conducted Concerto Vocale and the Saxon Baroque Orchestra Leipzig in a recording of Wer ist der, so von Edom kömmt. Another recording of the Passion oratorio was realized in 2020, by György Vashegyi conducting the Purcell Choir and Orfeo Orchestra.

== Sources ==
- Bitter, Karl Hermann (1872). "Siebenzehnter Brief: Weiteres über Händel – Graun – Dessen geistliche Cantaten" [Seventeenth letter: More about Handel; Graun; his sacred cantatas]. Beiträge zur Geschichte des Oratoriums [Contributions to the history of the oratorio] (in German). Berlin: Oppenheim. pp. 318–335.
- Grubbs, John W. (1965). "Ein Passions-Pasticcio des 18. Jahrhunderts" [A pasticcio Passion of the 18th century]. In Dürr, Alfred; Neumann, Werner (eds.). Bach-Jahrbuch 1965 [Bach-Yearbook 1965]. Bach-Jahrbuch (in German). Vol. 51. Translated by Dürr, Alfred. Neue Bachgesellschaft. Berlin: Evangelische Verlagsanstalt (published 1966). pp. 10–42. doi:10.13141/bjb.v1965 – via Qucosa.
- Hellmann, Diethard (1967). "Eine Kuhnau-Bearbeitung Joh. Seb. Bachs?" [Joh. Seb. Bach's arrangement of a composition by Kuhnau?]. In Dürr, Alfred; Neumann, Werner (eds.). Bach-Jahrbuch 1967 [Bach-Yearbook 1967]. Bach-Jahrbuch (in German). Vol. 53. Neue Bachgesellschaft. Berlin: Evangelische Verlagsanstalt (published 1968). pp. 93–99. doi:10.13141/bjb.v1967 – via Qucosa.
- Wollny, Peter (2002). "Tennstedt, Leipzig, Naumburg, Halle - Neuerkenntnisse zur Bach-Überlieferung in Mitteldeutschland". In Schulze, Hans-Joachim; Wolff, Christoph (eds.). Bach-Jahrbuch 2002. Bach-Jahrbuch (in German). Vol. 88. Neue Bachgesellschaft. Leipzig: Evangelische Verlagsanstalt. pp. 29–60. doi:10.13141/bjb.v2002. ISBN 3-374-02031-3. ISSN 0084-7682 – via Qucosa.
