= Tristis est anima mea (attributed to Kuhnau) =

Sacred motet attributed to Johann Kuhnau

- Sacred motet by Johann Kuhnau (attrib.)
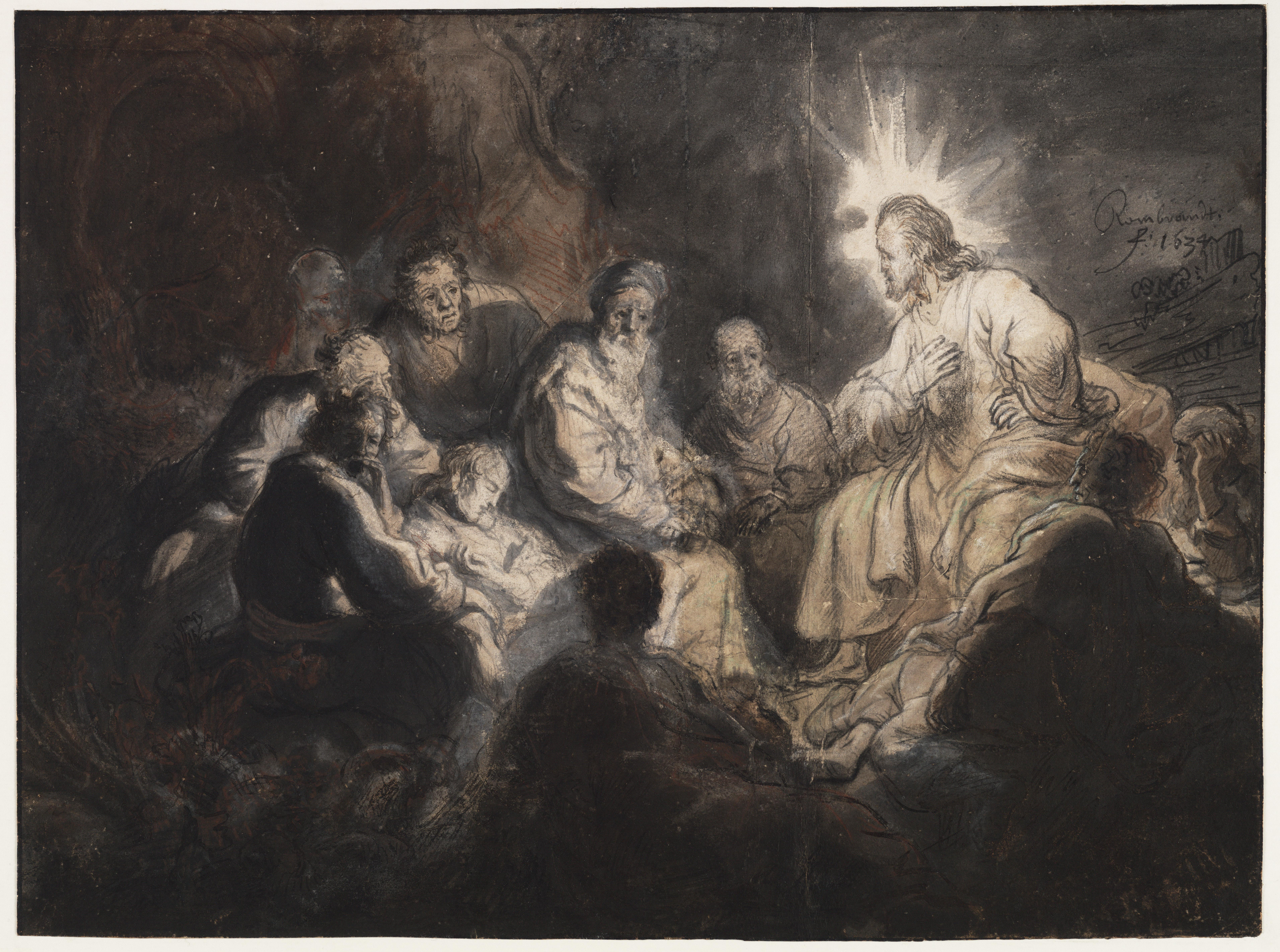
- Christ and His Disciples in the Garden of Gethsemane (Rembrandt)
- English: My soul is exceedingly sorrowful
- Key: F minor
- Occasion: Maundy Thursday
- Text: Matthew 26:38
- Language: Latin
- Vocal: SSATB

Tristis est anima mea (Sad is my soul) is a sacred motet for five voices attributed to Johann Kuhnau, Thomaskantor in Leipzig. The text is the second responsory at Tenebrae for Maundy Thursday, one of the Latin texts kept in the liturgy after the town converted to Lutheranism.

Kuhnau's successor at the Thomaskirche, Johann Sebastian Bach, adapted the music to a German text, Der Gerechte kömmt um, and added an instrumental accompaniment.

== History ==
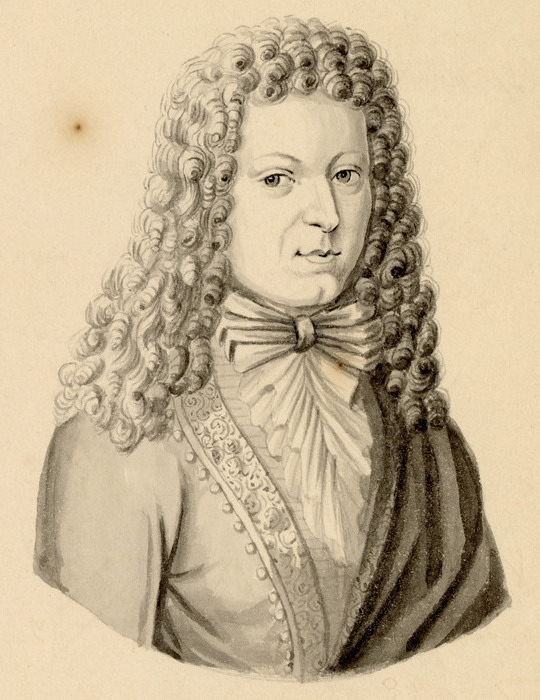
Johann Kuhnau

Johann Kuhnau was Johann Sebastian Bach's predecessor as Thomaskantor in Leipzig. Philipp Spitta's 19th century biography of the latter contains the following:

[Kuhnau] was better versed in the technicalities of vocal writing than most other German composers of the time. His five-part motett for Holy Thursday, Tristis est anima mea usque ad mortem,^{288} may be reckoned among the more prominent works of the kind; if it is not of equal merit with the motetts of Joh. Christoph and Joh. Ludwig Bach even in technical qualities, it has a breadth of conception which betrays the study of the classical Italian models.

^{288} It exists in the separate parts in the library of the Leipzig Singakademie and is numbered 362.

More recently the attribution to Kuhnau has been doubted. By then it proved impossible to ascertain authorship on source-critical grounds (among other reasons while the Leipzig parts mentioned by Spitta could no longer be traced).

=== Text ===
The motet is set to the Latin text of the second Tenebrae responsory for Maundy Thursday. The theme of that text is Jesus in the garden Gethsemane, addressing his disciples. Its first two lines are quoted from Matthew 26:38. The first words of the text, told in the first person, are translated as "My soul is exceeding sorrowful" in the King James Version (KJV). While the first two lines are quoted from the Bible, the next two are anonymous poetry, Jesus predicting that the disciples will see a crowd ("Iam videbitis turbam"), they will take flight ("Vos fugam capietis"), and he will go to be sacrificed for them ("et ego vadam immolari pro vobis").

=== Music ===
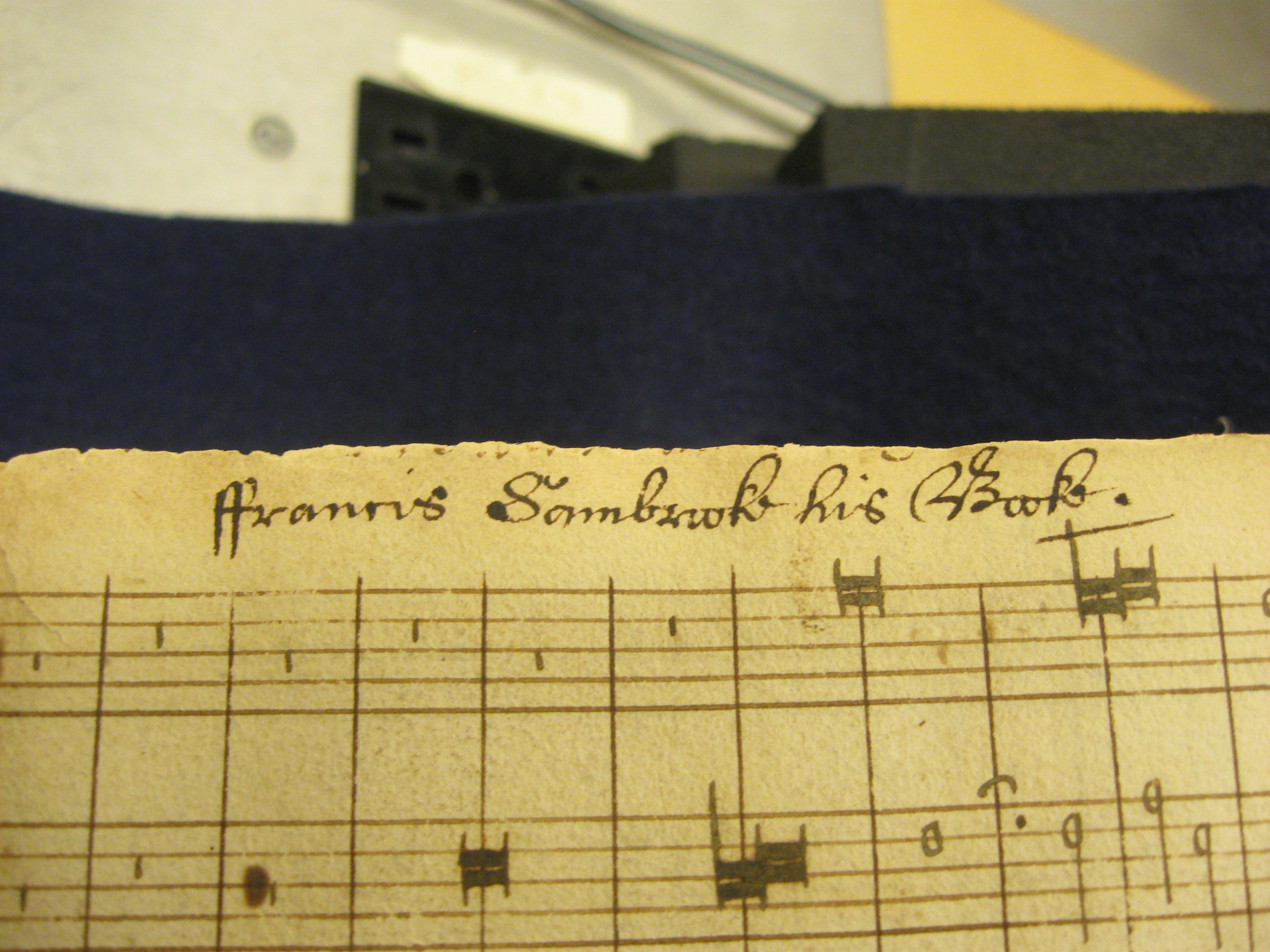
First notes sung by soprano and (first) alto of Lassus' Tristis est anima mea, No. 1 in Drexel 4302

The composer set the motet for five parts, two sopranos, alto, tenor and bass (SSATB). He followed an example by Orlando di Lasso of the same text also for five parts, indicated depending on edition as SAATB or SATTB. Both works open in a similar way, with "closely overlapping vocal entries, and both shift to homophonic declamation at the words "Iam videbitis turbam" (You will see the crowd).

The composer follows Italian models. John Butt describes his approach as "conservative in texture but extremely expressive".

The first eight measures are devoted exclusively to the word "tristis" (sad, sorrowful), with the voices entering one after the other, each beginning with a long note, from the lowest to the highest which sings only a short sighing motif. Only then comes the complete first line, expressed in polyphony until measure 20, ending with "ad mortem" (unto death), which the bass sings in a chromatic downward line of long notes. "ad mortem" is repeated, mirroring the beginning: the voices enter again one after the other but beginning with the highest voice. The harmonies are intensified, resolved in measure 30. After a short rest, the second line of the text is presented in similar building, this time in the sequence from inside out: alto, soprano II and tenor together, soprano I and bass almost together, all arriving in measure 50 in homophony on the last word "mecum", which marks the end of the biblical text and is followed by a long rest with a fermata.

The predictions follow each other without a rest. The first (you will see a crowd) one begins in homophonic declamation, the second (which will surround me, measure 60) building with entrances in the sequence tenor, alto, soprano II, bass, soprano I, the third (you will take flight, measure 70) in denser texture with two voices entering together and a repeated motif of a faster descending line. In the fourth prediction "Et ego vadam" (And I will go, measure 85), Jesus speaks of himself, and the composer expresses it by the voices entering one after another, but with exactly the same motif, in the first four voices even from the same pitch (tenor, bass, soprano II, alto. After a leap down of a minor sixth, even steps lead upwards. The voices arrive in homophony when they first pronounce "immolari" (sacrificed), followed by a second long rest with a fermata. The word is repeated and intensified (from measure 99), with a climax of the soprano ascending step by step to G, their highest note. The words "pro vobis" (for you) follow within the polyphony, first by the alto, followed immediately by soprano II, soprano I and bass together, tenor. In the last phrase, the ascending steps appear in the bass.

Throughout the piece, the composer keeps the same tempo and mood, with subtle attention to different parts and even individual words of the text. It has been described as a "serenely reflective" work. Butt concludes:

This piece, apparently performed by J. S. Bach, is not securely attributable to Kuhnau. However, it shows the works of a skillful and highly imaginative composer with considerable dramatic flair.

== Der Gerechte kömmt um ==
Around 1750 the pasticcio passion oratorio Wer ist der, so von Edom kömmt was assembled in the circle around Johann Sebastian Bach and his son-in-law Johann Christoph Altnickol. Its basis was the then popular passion cantata Ein Lämmlein geht und trägt die Schuld (A lambkin goes and bears our guilt) by Carl Heinrich Graun (GraunWV B:VII:4), which was expanded with compositions by Georg Philipp Telemann and others. Nos. 19 and 20 of the pasticcio appeared to be composed by Johann Sebastian Bach (BWV 127 No. 1 and 1088 respectively).

On stylistic grounds scholars such as Diethard Hellmann see chorus No. 39 of the pasticcio, an orchestrated version of the Tristis est anima mea motet on a parody text, as an arrangement by Bach. The music is transposed half a tone down to E minor. The German text of the chorus, Der Gerechte kömmt um (The righteous perishes), is translated from Isaiah 57:1–2. Ecce quomodo moritur justus, a Latin version of that text, is another responsory for Holy Week. The arrangement with the German text may have been a stand-alone (funeral?) motet performed in Leipzig in Bach's time. The orchestral accompaniment consists of two characteristic woodwind parts, strings and continuo.

If both attributions are correct (the original to Kuhnau, the arrangement to Bach) this seems the only instance of Bach adopting music of his predecessor. Kuhnau's ideas were however more easily adopted by his successor: there is the imitation of Kuhnau's style in the final chorus of Bach's very first cantata for Leipzig, there are the links to Kuhnau in Bach's Magnificat (SSATB chorus, Christmas interpolations) and there are the similarities in both their Clavier-Übung publications. Harsh judgements have been passed on the quality of Kuhnau's music: Spitta, after describing various aspects of where he sees Kuhnau's choral music wanting, concludes: "Kuhnau did not understand the world, nor did the world understand him..." The musical quality of Tristis est anima mea appears to rise above this, which is why the attribution to Kuhnau is considered doubtful, and why it seems reasonable to assume that Bach, judging on quality, reused it.

== Publication ==
Tristis est anima mea was published by the Carus-Verlag in a version with basso continuo. The motet appears in a critical edition named The Kuhnau-Project, edited by David Erler in the Pfefferkorn Musikverlag.

== Recordings ==
Tristis est anima mea was frequently recorded, including by the Dresdner Kreuzchor conducted by Rudolf Mauersberger in 1957, and by the Windsbacher Knabenchor conducted by Hans Thamm in 1967. A collection of Kuhnau's sacred music was performed by The King’s Consort, conducted by Robert King, in 1998. The Kammerchor Joaquin des Préz, conducted by Ludwig Böhme, sang it in 2012 as part of a collection of music by Bach and his predecessors as Thomaskantor. A reviewer notes: "The setting Tristis est anima mea is not wholly authenticated as being by Johann Kuhnau ... Yet whoever wrote it, this Motet, so sure, direct and moving, is one of the most ear-catching in this selection."
