= Georgius Nigrinus =

Bohemian printer (flourished 1571/72–1606)

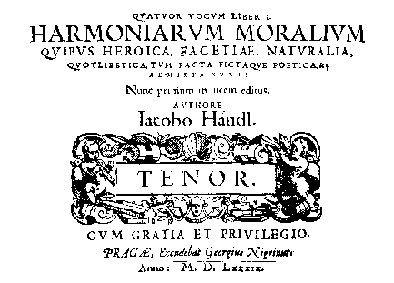
A publication printed by Georgius Nigrinus, 1589

Georgius Nigrinus (Czech: Jiří Nigrin or Nygryn or Černý, German: Georg Nigrinus or Schwarz), since about 1590 titled à Nigro Ponte (Czech: z Nigropontu or z Černého Mostu), (fl. 1571/72–1606) was an important printer in Prague between 1571/72 and 1606. Among other works, Nigrin published many of the compositions of the Renaissance composer Jacobus Gallus.
