= Jacobus Gallus =

Slovene Renaissance composer

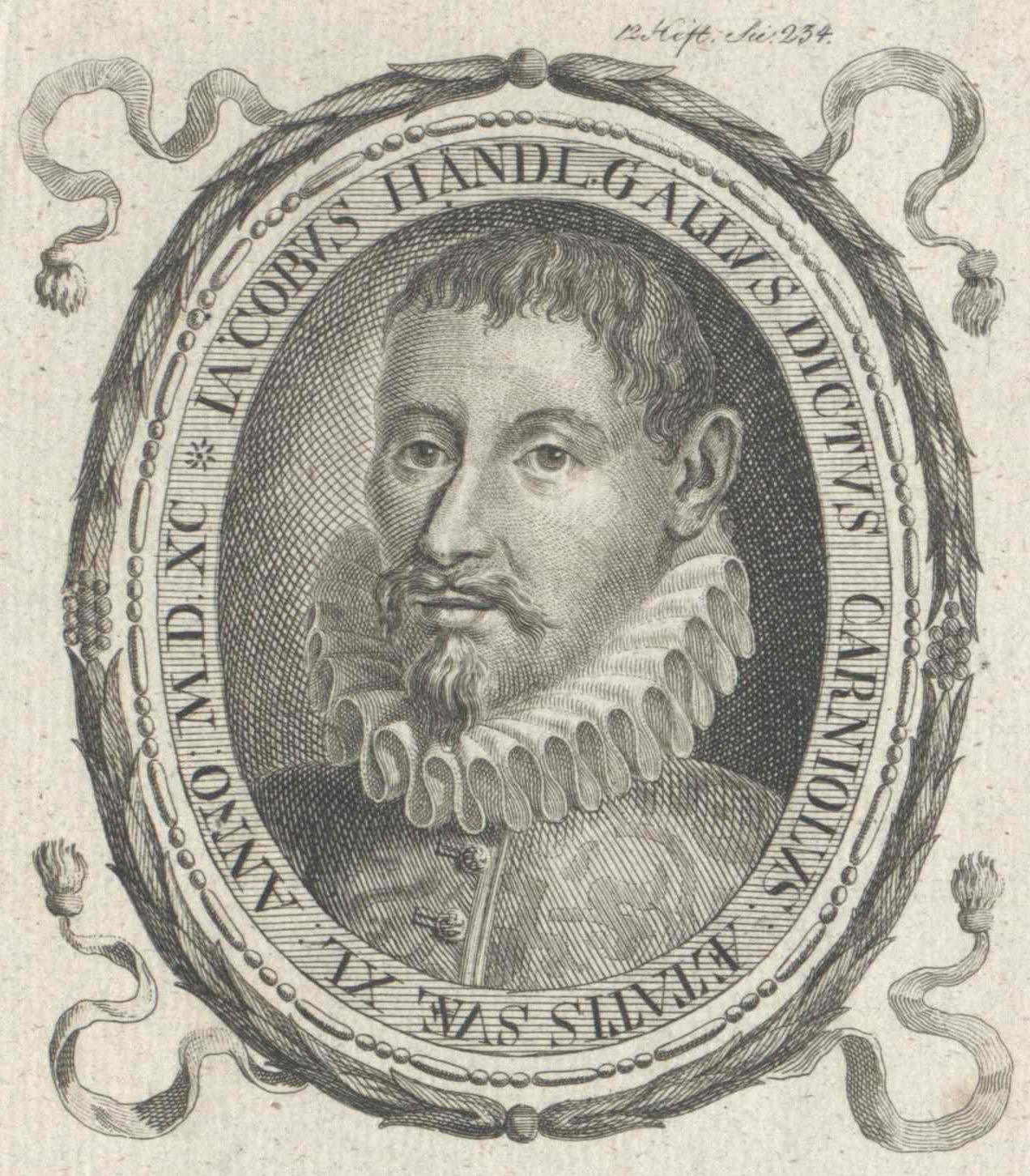
Jacobus Gallus, a woodcut portrait from 1590

Jacobus Gallus (a.k.a. Jacob(us) Handl, Jacob(us) Händl; between 15 April and 31 July 1550 – 18 July 1591) was a late-Renaissance composer of presumed Slovene ethnicity. Born in Carniola, which at the time was one of the Habsburg lands in the Holy Roman Empire, he lived and worked in Moravia and Bohemia during the last decade of his life.

== Life ==
Gallus's name has been Slovenianized as Jakob Petelin (petelin means 'rooster'; Handl and gallus mean the same in German and Latin, respectively). However, Gallus never used the name Petelin. He was probably born in Reifnitz (now Ribnica, southern Slovenia), although Slovene folk tradition also claims his birthplace to be at Šentviška Gora in the Slovenian Littoral. He used the Latin form of his name, to which he often added the adjective Carniolus, thus giving credit to his homeland Carniola.

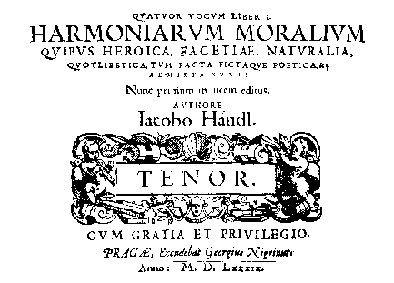
Harmoniae morales from printer Jiří Nigrin, 1589

Gallus most likely was educated at the Cistercian Stična Abbey in Carniola. He left Carniola sometime between 1564 and 1566, traveling first to Austria, and later to Bohemia, Moravia and Silesia. For some time he lived at the Benedictine Melk Abbey in Lower Austria. He was a member of the Viennese court chapel in 1574, and was choirmaster (Kapellmeister) to the bishop of Olomouc between 1579 (or 1580) and 1585. From 1585 to his death he worked in Prague as organist to the Church of St. John on the Balustrade (Czech: Sv. Jan na Zábradlí). Gallus died on 18 July 1591 in Prague.

== Work ==
Gallus represented the Counter-Reformation in Bohemia, mixing the polyphonic style of the High Renaissance Franco-Flemish School with the style of the Venetian School. His output was both sacred and secular, and hugely prolific: over 500 works have been attributed to him. Some are for large forces, with multiple choirs of up to 24 independent parts.

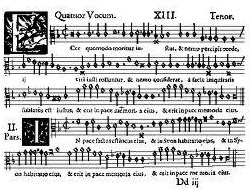
Tenor voice part of Gallus' Ecce quomodo moritur iustus, published in his Opus Musicum II (1587).

His most notable work is the four-part Opus musicum (1586–1590), a collection of 374 motets that cover the liturgical needs of the entire ecclesiastical year. The motets were printed in the Prague printing house of Georgius Nigrinus, which also published 16 of his 20 extant masses. The motet O magnum mysterium comes from the first volume (printed in 1586), which covers the period from the first Sunday of Advent to the Septuagesima. His motets show evidence of influence by the Venetian polychoral style, with their use of the coro spezzato technique.

His wide-ranging, eclectic style blended archaism and modernity. He rarely used the cantus firmus technique, preferring the then-new Venetian polychoral manner, yet he was equally conversant with earlier imitative techniques. Some of his chromatic transitions foreshadowed the breakup of modality; his five-voice motet Mirabile mysterium contains chromaticism worthy of Carlo Gesualdo. He enjoyed word painting in the style of the madrigal, yet he could write the simple Ecce quomodo moritur justus later used by George Frideric Handel in his funeral anthem The Ways of Zion Do Mourn.

His secular output, about 100 short pieces, was published in the collections Harmoniae morales (Prague 1589 and 1590) and Moralia (Nuremberg 1596). Some of these works were madrigals in Latin, an unusual language for the form (most madrigals were in Italian); others were songs in German, and others were compositions in Latin.

Critical editions of Gallus works have been prepared by Edo Škulj and published by the Research Centre of the Slovenian Academy of Sciences and Arts (ZRCSAZU).

== Commemoration ==
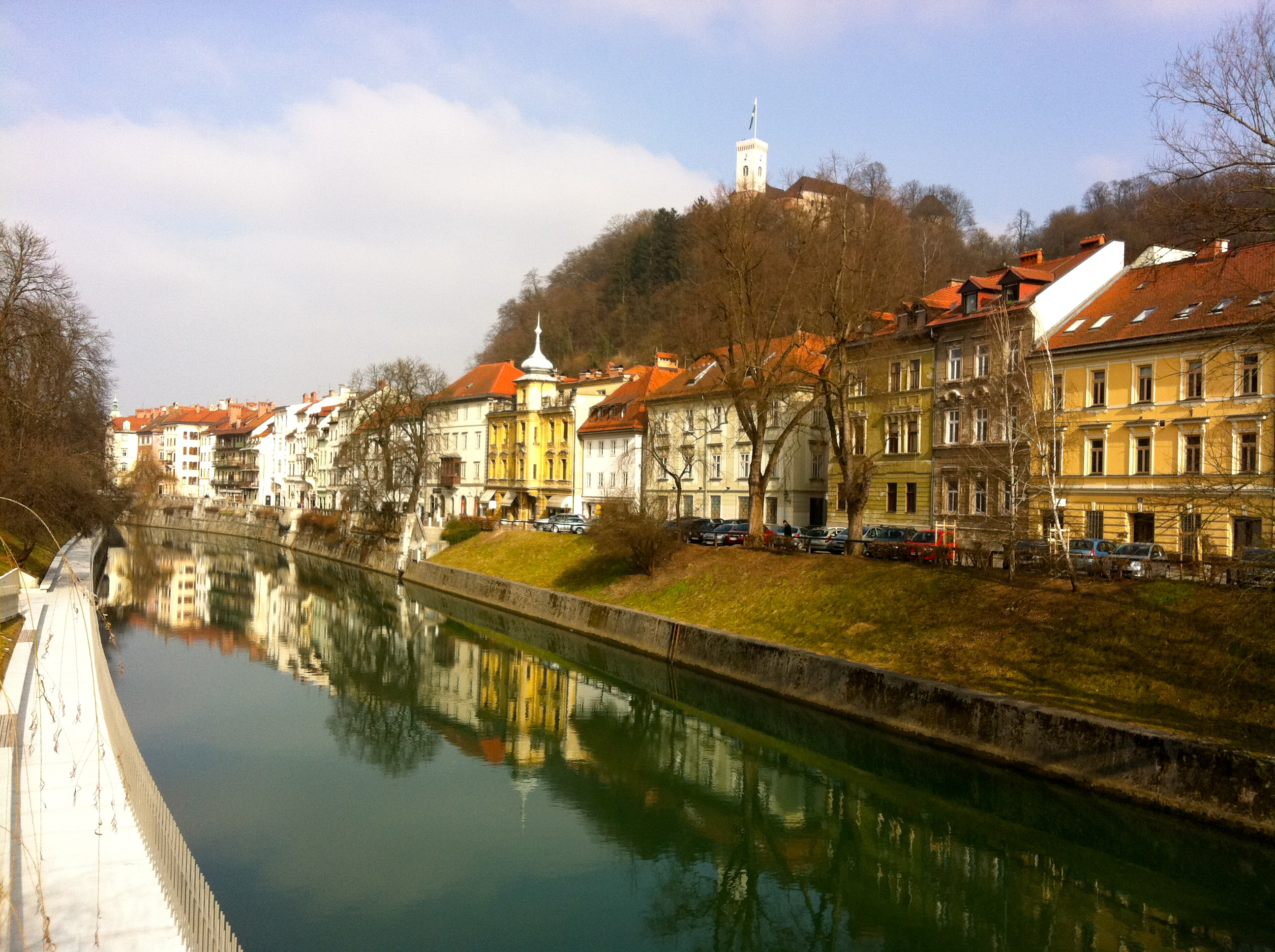
Gallus Embankment in Ljubljana

Gallus has been commemorated with the naming of the central hall in the Cankar Centre Gallus Hall (Gallusova dvorana). Part of the right embankment of the river Ljubljanica in Ljubljana, stretching from St. James's Bridge to the Cobbler's Bridge, has the name Gallus Embankment (Gallusovo nabrežje). This is also the name of the left embankment of the river Bistrica in the town of Ribnica, his birthplace. A monument with a bronze head of the composer, work by the architect Jože Plečnik and the sculptor Lojze Dolinar from 1932, as well as a stone plaque from 1973 also commemorate him there. The plaque was originally installed already in 1933 but destroyed during World War II. The Slovenian Public Fund of Cultural Activities annually awards the deserving musicians the Bronze, Silver, and Gold Gallus Badges (Gallusova značka) and the Bronze, Silver, and Gold Gallus Citations (Gallusova plaketa). Gallus was depicted on the front side of the now-obsolete 200-tolar banknote of the Republic of Slovenia.
