= Johann Kuhnau =

German composer and polymath (1660–1722)

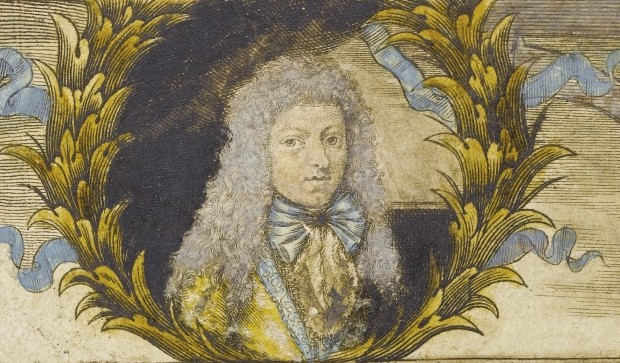
- Kuhnau's portrait, from a hand-colored 1689 edition of his Neue Clavier-Übung, erster Theil
- Born: 6 April 1660; Geising, Saxony
- Died: 5 June 1722 (aged 62); Leipzig
- Occupations: Polymath; Composer; Thomaskantor

Johann Kuhnau (German: [ˈkuːnaʊ]; 6 April 1660 – 5 June 1722) was a German polymath, known primarily as a composer today. He was also active as a novelist, translator, lawyer, and music theorist, and was able to combine these activities with his duties in his official post as Thomaskantor in Leipzig, which he occupied for 21 years. Much of his music, including operas, masses, and other large-scale vocal works, is lost. His reputation today rests on his Biblical Sonatas, a set of programmatic keyboard sonatas published in 1700, in which each sonata depicted in detail a particular story from the Bible. After his death, Kuhnau was succeeded as Thomaskantor by Johann Sebastian Bach.

== Biography ==
Much of the biographical information on Kuhnau is known from an autobiography published by Johann Mattheson in 1740 in his Grundlage einer Ehrenpforte. Kuhnau's Protestant family were originally from Bohemia, and their name was Kuhn. Kuhnau was born in Geising, present-day Saxony. His musical talents were apparent early, and in around 1670, he was sent to Dresden to study with court musicians there. During the next decade, he studied keyboard playing and music composition, as well as French and Italian. In 1680, an offshoot of the Great Plague of Vienna reached Dresden, and Kuhnau returned home. He subsequently studied music at the Johanneum in Zittau, and then law at Leipzig University. Exceptionally active as a composer and performer during his university years, he was appointed organist of Leipzig's Thomaskirche in 1684, at the age of 24.

In 1688, Kuhnau completed his dissertation and began practising law. He was still working as an organist and continued composing. In 1689 he published his first collection of keyboard works, followed by three more in 1692, 1696, and 1700. During the 1690s, he translated a number of books into German from Italian and French, completed and published his best-known novel, the satirical Der musicalische Quack-Salber (1700), and devoted his spare time to studying various subjects such as mathematics, Hebrew and Greek. In 1701 he succeeded Johann Schelle as Thomaskantor and kept the position until his death. Although he was successful in directing the many musical activities of the Thomaskirche and teaching at Thomasschule, Kuhnau started suffering from bad health. Scholar Willi Apel noted that the job was "as vexatious and difficult for him as for his successor, J.S. Bach." Not only health troubles, but also efforts by rival musicians and composers such as Georg Philipp Telemann and Kuhnau's own student Johann Friedrich Fasch, undermined his activities as Kantor.

Kuhnau died in Leipzig on 5 June 1722. He was survived by three daughters, from a marriage of 1689. His pupils included not only Fasch, but also Johann David Heinichen and Christoph Graupner.

== Music ==
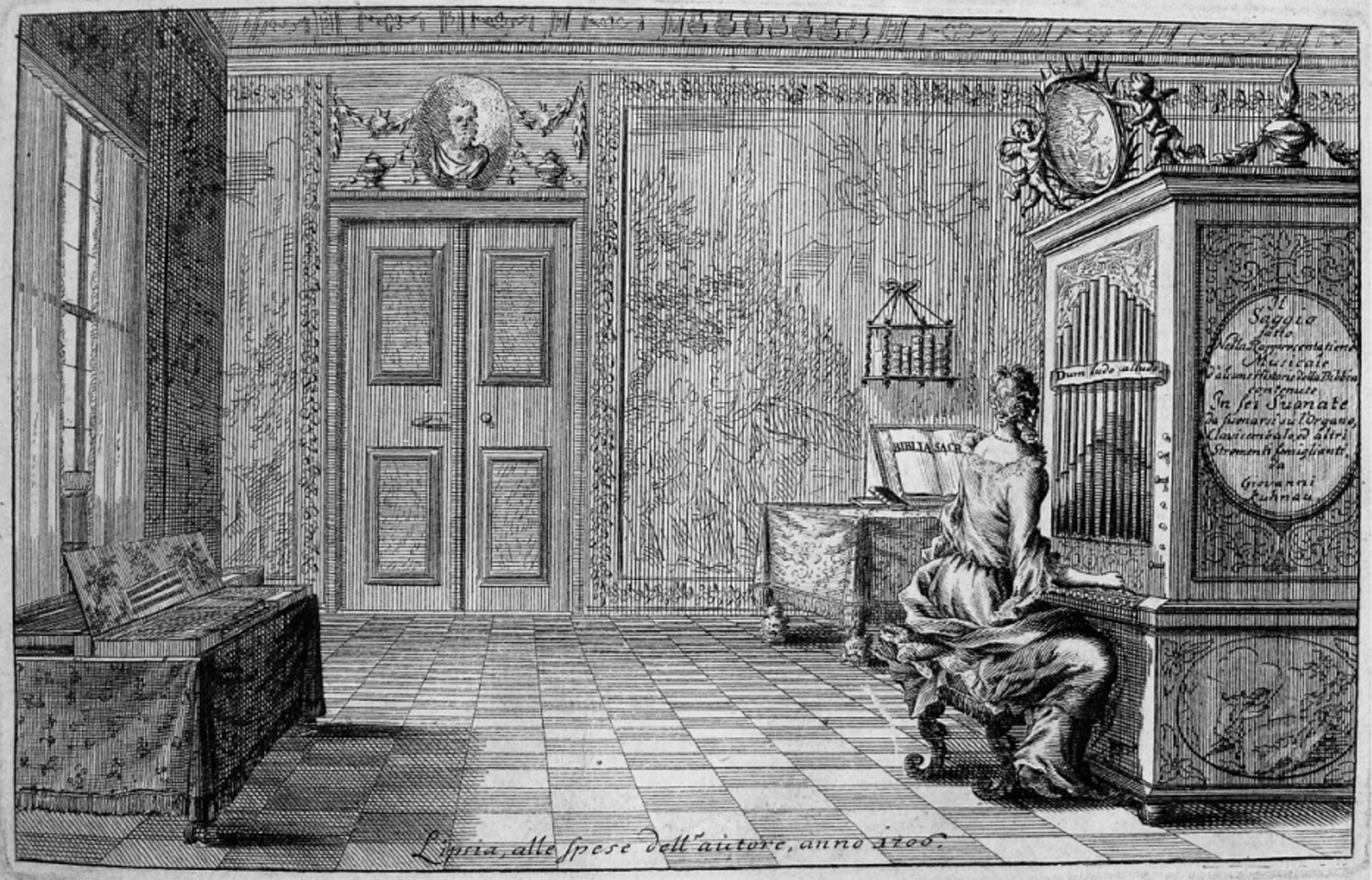
Engraving of frontispiece of Musicalische Vorstellung einiger biblischer Historien, the "Six Biblical Sonatas" published by Kuhnau and printed by Immanuel Tietze in 1710. In an idealised music room, the lady can be seen on the right playing a house organ with the motto Dum ludo alludo, a bible by the wall behind. On the left is a clavichord, concealing the tail of a harpsichord.

Kuhnau's reputation today rests on four collections of music for keyboard, which he published in 1689–1700. Particularly important is the last volume, titled Musicalische Vorstellung einiger biblischer Historien, and known popularly as the Biblical Sonatas. It contains six sonatas, each outlining a biblical story in several contrasting movements:

- The Fight between David and Goliath
- Saul's melancholy cured by the music played by David on his harp
- Jacob's Wedding
- Hezekiah's sickness and restoration
- Gideon, Saviour of Israel
- Jacob's Death and Burial

Kuhnau uses a wide variety of musical devices to portray the series of events (the sounding of trumpets, the hurling of David's stone, etc.) as well as the characters' psychological states (e.g. the Israelites' fright before a battle, or Hezekiah's joy darkened by a remembrance of his illness). These devices are not limited to changes of texture or harmony, but also include quotations from Protestant chorales (the Israelites' prayer is based on Luther's Aus tiefer Not schrei ich zu dir) and imitations of operatic arias (Gideon's fear).

The other keyboard works by Kuhnau show a varied approach to form. The two parts of his Clavier-Übung include 7 suites each. The first is only in the major mode, and the second is only in the minor mode. The suites almost always begin with a prelude, and continue through the usual order of dances – allemande, courante, sarabande, gigue – occasionally with a minuet or aria placed between the dances. Kuhnau's preludes are almost always in two sections: a prelude and a fugue (or a fugato section), complete with countersubjects Kuhnau mentions in the preface. Kuhnau's Sonata in B-flat major, appended to the Neuer Clavier-Übung, anderer Theil, was for some time considered to be the earliest known keyboard sonata. Later research has shown that it was rather the first keyboard sonata published in Germany and that Kuhnau simply followed the naming convention established by contemporary foreign composers. The composer himself commented on the issue in the preface:

I have also appended a Sonata in B-flat major, which should also be pleasing to the amateurs. Why shouldn't one provide such pieces for keyboard which are provided for other instruments? Indeed, no instrument has been able to dispute the clavier's reputation for perfection.

The third volume, titled Frische Clavier Früchte, contains six sonatas modelled on Italian chamber sonatas. According to music authors Milton Cross and David Ewen, the work's publication is an "important event in musical history" since it is one of the earliest serious attempts at composing works for keyboard instruments besides the organ. A wide variety of forms and textures is employed: even the opening movements range from toccata-like miniatures to full-fledged chaconnes. Kuhnau's approach to the episodes of the many fugues of this collection has been called "perhaps his primary contribution to the historical development of fugue as an extended form" by one scholar. Frische Clavier Früchte was Kuhnau's most popular work in his lifetime, reprinted five times (including one posthumous publication).

Much of Kuhnau's vocal music is lost, including an opera (Orpheus), a setting of the Passion according to St. Mark (Markus-Passion), a three-choir Te Deum, and at least two settings of the mass. The surviving cantatas are simple harmonically and melodically, yet expressive. Unlike those of his predecessors at the Thomaskirche, Kuhnau's cantatas feature a unified approach to form: most begin with an instrumental section followed by alteration of arias and recitatives. The Christmas cantata Uns ist ein Kind geboren, formerly attributed to Bach as BWV 142, was most likely composed by Kuhnau.

== Writings ==
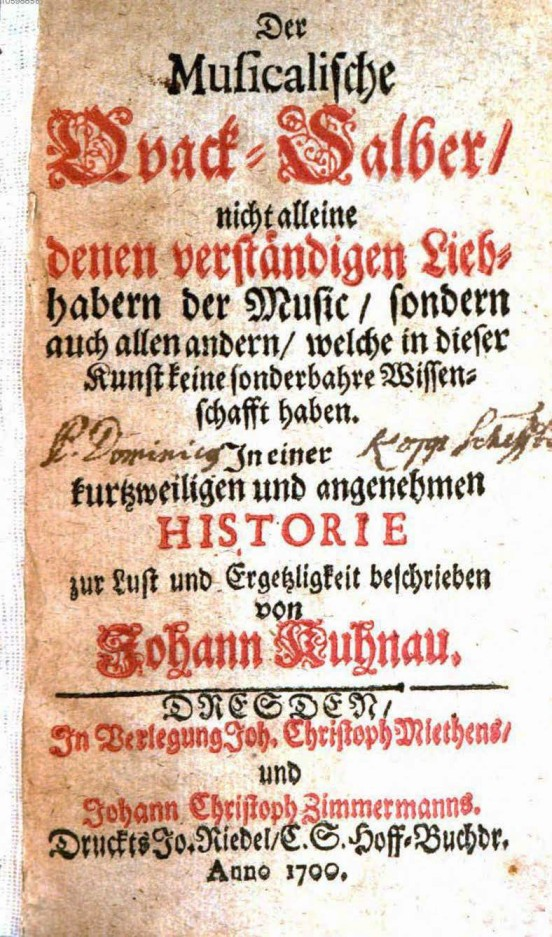
Title page of Kuhnau's satirical novel Der musicalische Quack-Salber

Of the few surviving books and treatises by Kuhnau, perhaps the most important is Der musicalische Quack-Salber ("The Musical Quack"), a satirical novel published in 1700. It describes the fictional exploits of Caraffa, a German charlatan who strives to make a name for himself as musician by posing as an Italian virtuoso. The novel's literary qualities have been noted, one writer venturing to call it linguistically innovative, and it has also proven to be a singularly valuable source for performance practices of the late 17th century. Two other satirical works by Kuhnau are known: Der Schmid seines eignen Unglückes ("The Maker of His Own Misfortune", 1695) and Des klugen und thörichten Gebrauchs der Fünf Sinnen ("On the Clever and Foolish Use of the Five Senses", 1698). Some of Kuhnau's satirical concepts and story turns are influenced by Christian Weise's novels. Kuhnau knew Weise from his days at Zittau, where Weise worked as Rector of the Gymnasium, and Kuhnau used to provide music (now lost) for Weise's school plays.

Kuhnau's theoretical treatise Fundamenta compositionis survives in a single manuscript which also contains an anonymous treatise on double counterpoint (Kurtze doch deutliche Reguln von den doppelten Contrapuncten) and two texts by Christoph Bernhard; the entire manuscript was at one point attributed to Johann Sebastian Bach. Fundamenta appears to be a bad and partial copy from Kuhnau's original. The last five chapters are a direct copy from another Bernhard treatise on invertible counterpoint, while the discussion of modes is very similar to that in Walther's Praecepta der musicalischen Composition (1708), yet omits several passages included in Walther. The similarity raised an important question about Walther's well-known and highly regarded treatise: how heavily was it based upon Kuhnau's lost original? Or did both Walther and Kuhnau borrow from another writer, currently unknown?

Kuhnau authored at least two more theoretical works, but those are only known by name: Tractatus de tetrachordo seu musica antiqua ac hodierna and De triade harmonica. His views on musical modes, solmization, and other matters are preserved in a letter dated 8 December 1717, published by Mattheson in Critica musica in 1725. In addition, the "Biblical Sonatas" include a large preface in which Kuhnau explores the idea of program music and various related matters.

== Family ==
Kuhnau's nephew Johann Andreas Kuhnau, born in Annaberg on 1 December 1703, was one of the principal copyists for J. S. Bach. He attended the Thomasschule from 1718, and studied at the Leipzig University from 1719. He died after 1745.

== List of works ==
Numerous works by Kuhnau are lost, including stage works, cantatas, numerous pieces of occasional music, and so on. Some cantatas, arias, and odes survive in text-only versions. Lost also were at least two treatises: Tractatus de tetrachordo seu musica antiqua ac hodierna and De triade harmonica. The following list only includes works that are extant in complete form.

=== Keyboard ===
- Neuer Clavier-Übung, erster Theil, 7 suites (1689)
- Neuer Clavier-Übung, anderer Theil, 7 suites and 1 sonata (1692)
- Frische Clavier Früchte, 7 sonatas (1696)
- Musicalische Vorstellung einiger biblischer Historien, 6 sonatas (1700)
- Prelude in G major, organ
- Praeludium alla breve, organ
- Fugue in G major, organ
- Toccata in A major, organ

=== Sacred vocal ===
- Ach Herr, wie sind meiner Feinde so viel
- Bone Jesu, chare Jesu
- Christ lag in Todesbanden
- Daran erkennen wir, dass wir in ihm verbleiben
- Das Alte ist vergangen
- Ende gut und alles gut
- Erschrick mein Hertz vor dir
- Es steh Gott auf (doubtful)
- Frohlocket, ihr Völker, und jauchzet, ihr Heiden
- Gott der Vater, Jesus Christus, der Heil'ge Geist wohn uns bey
- Gott hat uns nicht gesetzt zum Zorn
- Gott sei mir gnädig
- Ich freue mich im Herrn
- Ich habe Lust abzuscheiden
- Ich hebe meine Augen auf
- Ihr Himmel jubilirt von oben
- In te Domine speravi
- Laudate pueri
- Lobe den Herrn meine Seele (2 versions, for 2 and 5 voices)
- Lobet, ihr Himmel, den Herrn
- Magnificat
- Mein Alter kommt, ich kann nicht sterben
- Missa brevis
- Muss nicht der Mensch auf dieser Erden
- Nicht nur allein am frohen Morgen
- O heilige Zeit, wo Himmel, Erd und Luft (2 versions, 1 for 2 voices doubtful, 1 for 4 voices)
- Schmücket das Fest mit Meyen
- Singet dem Herrn ein neues Lied
- Spirate clementes
- Tristis est anima mea
- Und ob die Feinde Tag und Nacht
- Vom Himmel hoch, da komm ich her
- Was Gott tut, das ist wohlgetan
- Weicht ihr Sorgen aus dem Hertzen
- Welt adieu, ich bin dein müde
- Wenn ihr fröhlich seid an euren Festen
- Wie schön leuchtet der Morgenstern

=== Secular vocal ===
- Ach Gott, wie lästu mich erstarren, aria for the burial of Rektor Titius, Zittau, 19 May 1681

=== Writings ===
- Divini numinis assistentia, illustrisque jure consultorum in florentissima academia Lipsiensi (dissertation; Leipzig, 1688)
- Der Schmid seines eignen Unglückes (novel; 1695)
- Des klugen und thörichten Gebrauchs der Fünf Sinnen (novel; 1698).
- Der musicalische Quack-Salber (novel; Dresden, 1700)
- Fundamenta compositionis (treatise; 1703)
