= Tenebrae (disambiguation) =

Tenebrae (Latin for "darkness") are Christian worship services held during Holy Week (before Easter)

Tenebrae may also refer to:

== Christian words and music ==
- Tenebrae Responsoria, prescribed readings for the services
- Tenebrae Responsoria (Gesualdo), settings by Gesualdo (1611)
- Tenebrae Responsories (Victoria), settings by Victoria (1585)
- Leçons de ténèbres (Couperin), settings by Couperin (1714)
- Sept répons des ténèbres, settings by Poulenc (1961)

== Other uses ==
- Tenebrae (film), a horror film by Dario Argento
  - Tenebrae (soundtrack), soundtrack album for the Dario Argento film
- Tenebrae (choir), a professional vocal ensemble founded and directed by Nigel Short
- Lux in Tenebris, farce by Brecht (1919)
- Tenebrae, a fictional character in the video game Tales of Symphonia: Dawn of the New World
- "Tenebrae", a poem by twentieth-century German poet Paul Celan
- The Tenebrae, a monster organization in the television series Jekyll & Hyde
- The Tenebrae, Latin name for the Keres, female death-spirits
- Tenebrae, a fictional kingdom in the video game Final Fantasy XV
- Tenebrae, a fictional town in the video game Ultima VIII: Pagan
- The Tenebrea Trilogy, a set of three of science-fiction novels written by Roxann Dawson and Daniel Graham.
- Tenebrae, the birth name of Darth Vitiate, the Sith Emperor in Star Wars: The Old Republic.

== See also ==
- Terebridae, a group of sea mollusks
- Category:Tenebrae
