= List of compositions by Carlo Gesualdo =

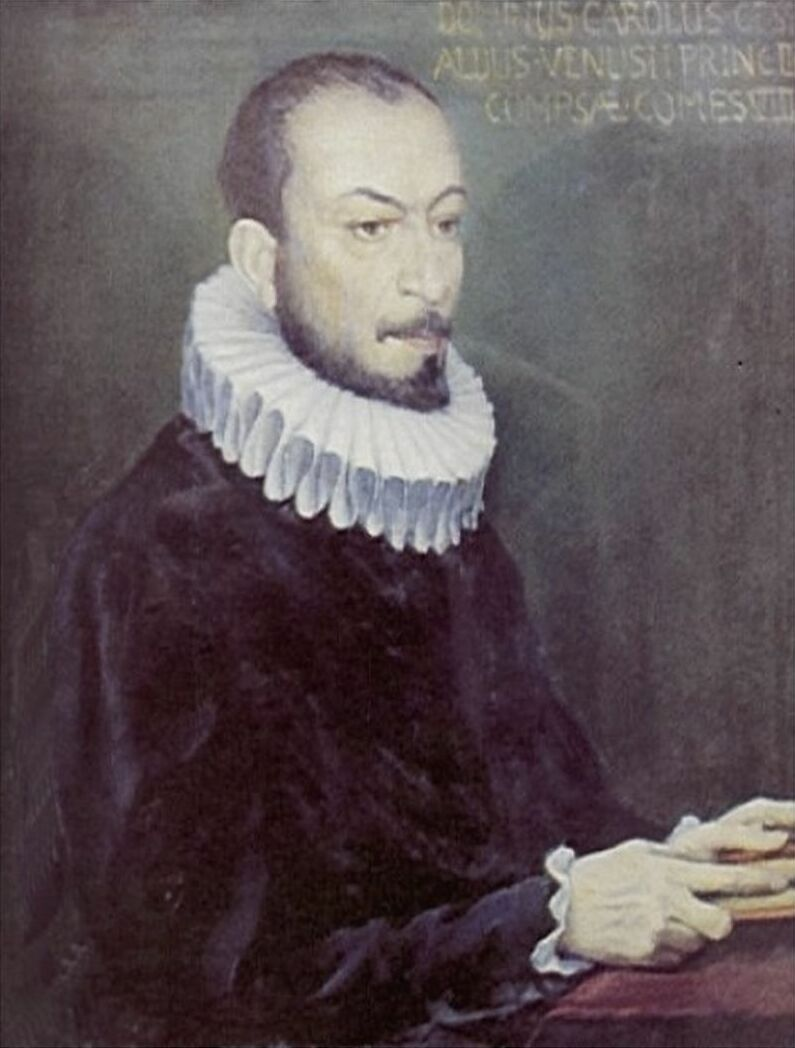
Carlo Gesualdo, Prince of Venosa.

This is a list of compositions by Carlo Gesualdo (1566–1613), the Prince of Venosa.

== Madrigals ==
Place and year of publication follows after the book number. Poet given in parentheses, if known. Madrigals are listed alphabetically by book.

=== Book I (Madrigali libro primo), op. 1, five voices. (Ferrara, 1594) ===
1. Baci soavi e cari (Giovanni Battista Guarini)
2. Bella Angioletta, da le vaghe piume (Torquato Tasso)
3. Come esser può ch'io viva (Alessandro Gatti)
4. Felice primavera (Tasso)
5. Gelo ha madonna il seno (Tasso)
6. Madonna, io ben vorrei
7. Mentre madonna il lasso fianco posa (Tasso)
8. Mentre mia stella, miri
9. Non mirar, non mirare (F. Alberti)
10. O dolce mio martire
11. Quanto ha di dolce amore
12. Questi leggiadri odorosetti fiori
13. Se da sí nobil mano (Tasso)
14. Sí gioioso mi fanno i dolor miei
15. Son sí belle le rose (Grillo)
16. Tirsi morir volea (Guarini)

=== Book II (Madrigili libro secondo), op. 2, five voices. (Ferrara, 1594) ===
1. All'apparir di quelle luci ardenti
2. Candida man qual neve
3. Caro amoroso neo (Tasso)
4. Dalle odorate spoglie
5. Hai rotto e sciolto e spento
6. In più leggiadro velo
7. Non è questa la mano (Tasso)
8. Non mai non cangerò
9. Non mi toglia il ben mio
10. O com'è gran martire (Guarini)
11. Se così dolce e il duolo (Tasso)
12. Sento che nel partire
13. Se per lieve ferita
14. Se taccio, il duol s'avanza (Tasso)

=== Book III (Madrigali libro terzo), op. 3, five voices. (Ferrara, 1595) ===
1. Ahi, disperata vita
2. Ahi, dispietata e cruda
3. Ancidetemi pur, grievi martiri
4. Crudelissima doglia
5. Deh, se già fu crudele
6. Del bel de'bei vostri occhi
7. Dolce spirto d'amore (Guarini)
8. Dolcissimo sospiro (Annibale Pocaterra)
9. Donna, se m'ancidente (six voices)
10. Languisco e moro, ahi, cruda
11. Meraviglia d'Amore
12. Non t'amo, o voce ingrata
13. Se piange, aime, la donna del mio core
14. Se vi miro pietosa
15. Voi volete ch'io mora (Guarini)
16. Sospirava il mio core
17. Veggio sí, dal mio sole

=== Book IV (Madrigali libro quarto), op. 5, five voices. (Ferrara, 1596) ===
1. Arde il mio cor, ed è si dolce il foco
2. A voi, mentre il mio core
3. Che fai meco, mio cor
4. Cor mio, deh, non piangete (Guarini)
5. Ecco, morirò dunque
6. Il sol, qualor più splende (six voices)
7. Io tacerò, ma nel silenzio mio
8. Luci serene e chiare (Ridolfo Arlotti)
9. Mentre gira costei
10. Moro, e mentre sospiro
11. Or, che in gioia credea
12. Questa crudele e pia
13. Se chiudete nel core
14. Sparge la morte al mio Signor nel viso
15. Talor sano desio

=== Book V (Madrigali libro quinto), op. 13, five voices. (Gesualdo, 1611) ===
1. Asciugate i begli occhi
2. Correte, amanti, a prova
3. Deh, coprite il bel seno (Ridolfo Arlotti)
4. Dolcissima mia vita
5. Felicissimo sonno
6. Gioite voi col canto
7. Itene, o miei sospiri
8. Languisce al fin chi da la vita parte
9. Mercè grido piangendo
10. Occhi del mio cor vita (Guarini)
11. O dolorosa gioia
12. O tenebroso giorno
13. O voi, troppo felici
14. Poichè l'avida sete
15. Qual fora, donna, un dolce 'Ohimè'
16. Se tu fuggi, io non resto
17. Se vi duol il mio duolo
18. S'io non miro non moro
19. T'amo mia vita, la mia cara vita (Guarini)
20. Tu m'uccidi, oh crudele

=== Book VI (Madrigali libro sesto), op. 14, five voices. (Gesualdo, 1611) ===
1. Alme d'Amor Rubelle
2. Al mio gioir il ciel si fa sereno
3. Ancide sol la morte
4. Ancor che per amarti
5. Ardita Zanzaretta
6. Ardo per te, mio bene
7. Beltà, poi che t'assenti
8. Candido e verde fiore
9. Chiaro risplender suole
10. Deh, come invan sospiro
11. Già piansi nel dolore
12. Io parto, e non più dissi
13. Io pur respiro in cosí gran dolore
14. Mille volte il dí moro
15. Moro, lasso, al mio duolo
16. O dolce mio tesoro
17. Quando ridente e bella
18. Quel 'no' crudel che la mia speme ancise
19. Resta di darmi noia
20. Se la mia morte brami
21. Volan quasi farfalle
22. Tu piangi, o Filli mia
23. Tu segui, o bella Clori

== Sacred works ==
=== Sacrae Cantiones I, op. 9, five voices. (1603) ===
1. Ave, Regina coelorum
2. Venit lumen tuum Jerusalem
3. Ave, dulcissima Maria
4. Reminiscere miserationum tuarum
5. Dignare me, laudare te
6. Sancti Spiritus Domine
7. Domine ne despicias
8. Hei mihi Domine
9. Laboravi in gemitu meo
10. Peccantem me quotidie
11. O vos omnes
12. Exaudi Deus deprecationem meam
13. Precibus et meritis beatae Mariae
14. O Crux benedicta
15. Tribularer si nescirem
16. Deus refugium et virtus
17. Tribulationem et dolorem
18. Illumina faciem tuam
19. Maria mater gratiae

=== Sacrae Cantiones II, op. 10, six, seven voices. (1603) ===
1. Virgo benedicta
2. Da pacem Domine
3. Sana me Domine
4. Ave sanctissima Maria
5. O Oriens
6. Discedite a me omnes
7. Gaudeamus omnes
8. Veni Creator Spiritus
9. O sacrum convivium
10. Adoramus te Christe
11. Veni sponsa Christi
12. Assumpta est Maria
13. Verba mea
14. Ardens est cor meum
15. Ne derelinquas me
16. O Beata Mater
17. Ad te levavi
18. Franciscus humilis et pauper
19. O anima sanctissima
20. Illumina nos

The Bassus and Sextus parts of Sacrae Cantiones II were lost; a reconstruction was published in 2013 by James Wood.

=== Responsoria et alia ad Officium Hebdomadae Sanctae spectantia, for six voices (1611) ===
Contains, apart from a setting of all 27 Tenebrae Responsoria, a setting of Psalm 51 and of the Benedictus.
