= O vos omnes =

Roman Catholic liturgical chant

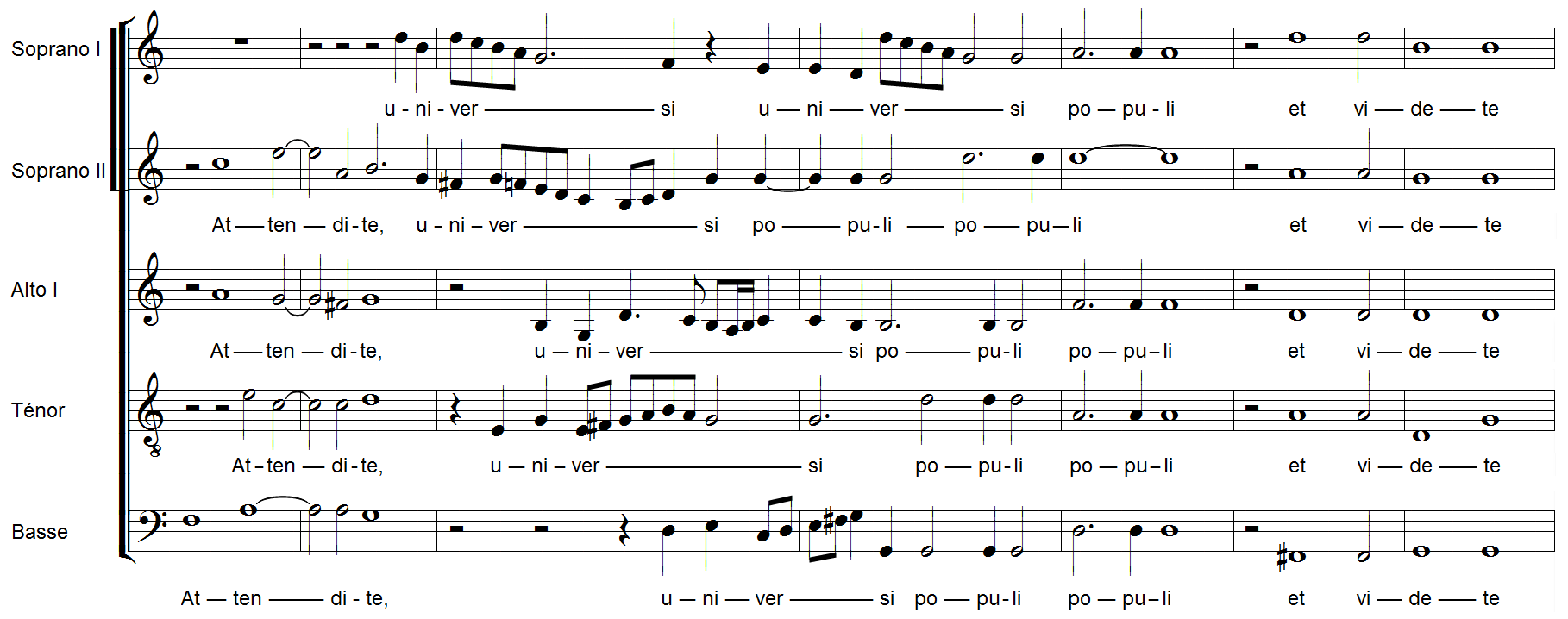
Extract of Carlo Gesualdo's setting of O vos omnes (1611)

O vos omnes (Victoria: 1585)
Recorded live in 2003 by The Tudor Consort (1.8Mb)

O vos omnes is a responsory, originally sung as part of Roman Catholic liturgies for Holy Week, and now often sung as a motet. The text is adapted from the Latin Vulgate translation of Lamentations 1:12. It was often set, especially in the sixteenth century, as part of the Tenebrae Responsories for Holy Saturday. Some of the most famous settings of the text are by:

- Tomás Luis de Victoria (two settings for four voices: 1572 and 1585)
- Carlo Gesualdo (five voices: 1603; six voices: 1611)
- Pablo Casals (mixed choir: 1932)

== Text ==
O vos ómnes qui transítis per víam, atténdite et vidéte:

Si est dólor símilis sícut dólor méus.

V. Atténdite, univérsi pópuli, et vidéte dolórem méum.

Si est dólor símilis sícut dólor méus.

Translation

O all you who walk by on the road, pay attention and see:

if there be any sorrow like my sorrow.

V. Pay attention, all people, and look at my sorrow:

if there be any sorrow like my sorrow.

== See also ==
- Juan Esquivel Barahona
