= Tenebrae =

Christian religious service

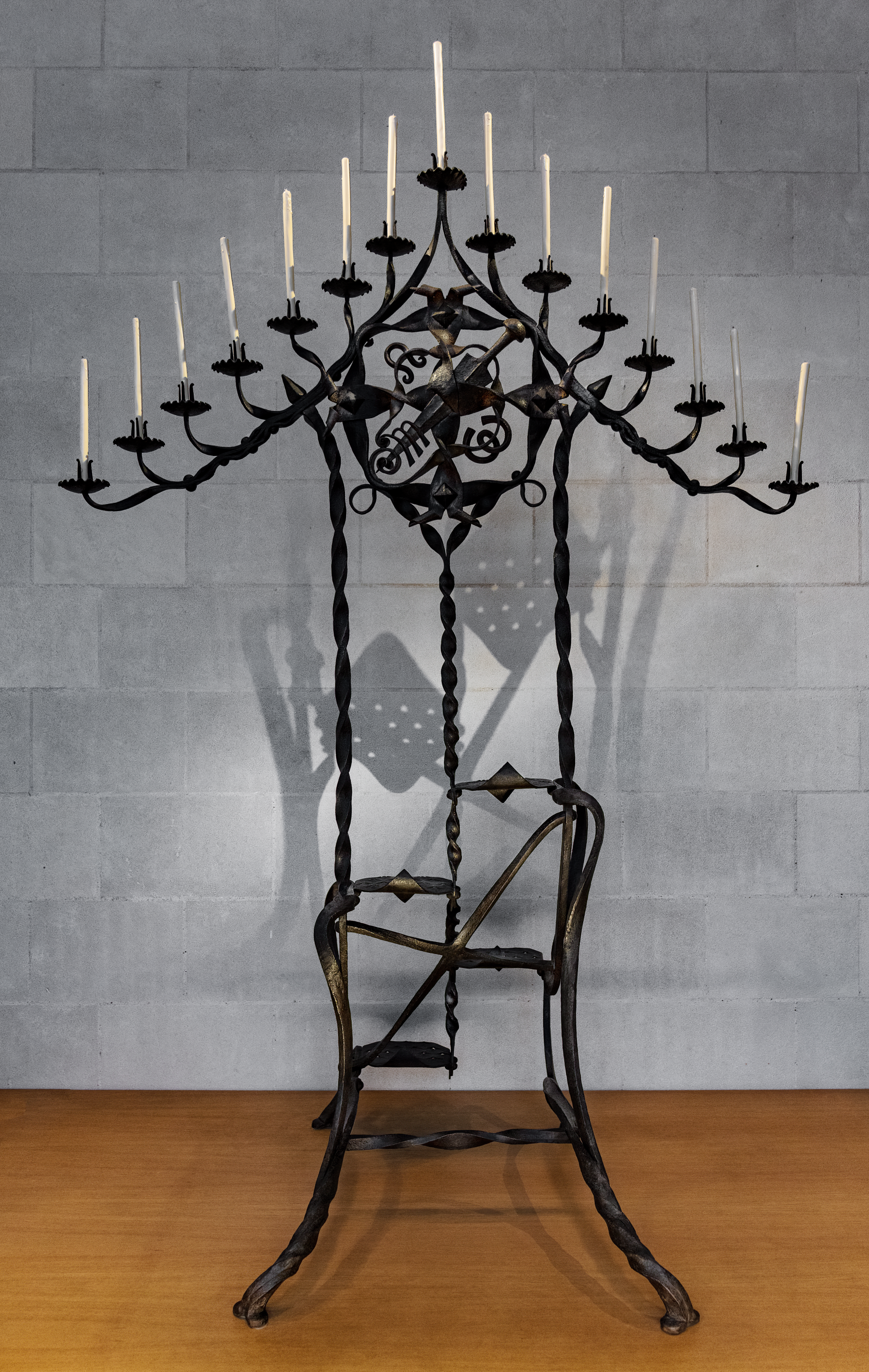
Fifteen candles on Tenebrae hearse - Antoni Gaudí - Sagrada Família. The candles are extinguished one by one during the course of the service.

Tenebrae (/ˈtɛnəbreɪ, -bri/—Latin for 'darkness') is a religious service of Western Christianity held during the three days preceding Easter Day, and characterized by a gradual extinguishing of candles, and the strepitus or "loud noise" in the total darkness at the end of the service.

Tenebrae was originally a celebration of matins and lauds of the last three days of Holy Week (Maundy Thursday, Good Friday, and Holy Saturday) in the evening of the previous day (Holy Wednesday, Maundy Thursday and Good Friday) to the accompaniment of special ceremonies that included the display of lighted candles on a special triangular candelabrum.

Modern celebrations called Tenebrae may be of quite different content and structure, based for example on the Seven Last Words or readings of the Passion of Jesus. They may be held on only one day of Holy Week, especially Spy Wednesday (Holy Wednesday). They may be held during the daylight hours and the number of candles, if used, may vary.

Tenebrae liturgical celebrations of this kind now exist in the Catholic Church's Latin liturgical rites, Lutheranism, Anglicanism, Methodism, Reformed churches (Continental Reformed, Presbyterian and Congregationalist traditions) and Western Rite Orthodoxy.

== Catholic Church ==
=== Original form ===
In the Catholic Church, "Tenebrae" is the name given to the celebration, with special ceremonies, of matins and lauds, the first two hours of the Divine Office of each of the last three days of Holy Week. In the Roman Rite of the Catholic Church Tenebrae was celebrated in all churches with a sufficient number of clergy until the liturgical reforms of Pope Pius XII in the 1950s. The traditions regarding this service go back at least to the ninth century. Matins, originally celebrated a few hours after midnight, and lauds, originally celebrated at dawn, were anticipated by the late Middle Ages on the afternoon or evening of the preceding day, and were given the name "Tenebrae" because they concluded when darkness was setting in.

The celebration of matins and lauds of these days on the previous evening in the form referred to as Tenebrae in churches with a sufficient number of clergy was universal in the Roman Rite until the reform of the Holy Week ceremonies by Pope Pius XII in 1955. He restored the Easter Vigil as a night office, moving that Easter liturgy from Holy Saturday morning to the following night and likewise moved the principal liturgies of Holy Thursday and Good Friday from morning to afternoon or evening. Thus matins and lauds of Good Friday and Holy Saturday could no longer be anticipated on the preceding evening, and even matins and lauds of Holy Thursday was allowed to be anticipated only in the case of cathedral churches in which the Chrism Mass was held on Holy Thursday morning.

The 1960 Code of Rubrics, which was incorporated in the next typical edition of the Roman Breviary, published on 5 April 1961, a year ahead of the publication of the 1962 edition of the Roman Missal, allowed no anticipation whatever of lauds, though matins alone could still be anticipated to the day before, later than the hour of vespers.

In sum:

- Until 1955 the three consecutive Tenebrae services for Holy Thursday, Good Friday and Holy Saturday, including the typical ceremonies such as the extinguishing of candles, with each of these three services anticipated on the previous evening, were widely celebrated as an integral part of the liturgy of Holy Week in churches with a sufficient number of clergy wherever the Roman Rite was followed. A rich tradition of music composed for these central occasions had developed.
- From 1956 to 1970 the practice largely declined:
  - The 1955 papal document restored the celebration of matins and lauds of Holy Thursday, Good Friday and Holy Saturday to their original timing as morning services, with only a little allowance for anticipating any of them on the evening before. On these three days attention shifted from what became morning services to the services that were now to be held in the afternoon or evening. Communal celebration of matins and lauds became limited generally to communities that observed the full Divine Office in congregational form. Matins and lauds, having lost their exceptional character, provided composers with little incentive to produce new music for them and there was no demand for grand performances of the existing music earlier composed for Tenebrae.
  - The Roman Breviary, as updated in 1961, did not mention any specific Tenebrae ceremonies to accompany the no longer anticipated matins and lauds of Maundy Thursday, Good Friday and Holy Saturday.
- Finally, in the wake of the Second Vatican Council, matins and lauds throughout the year were completely reformed. Matins, for instance, no longer had the nine psalms and lauds the five psalms that determined the number of candles extinguished in the Tenebrae celebration.

==== Structure of the original Tenebrae ====
The structure is the same for all three days. The first part of the service is matins, which in its pre-1970 form is composed of three nocturns, each consisting of three psalms, a versicle, a silent Pater noster, and three readings, each followed by a responsory. The pre-1970 lauds consists of five psalms, a short versicle and response, and the Benedictus Gospel canticle, followed by Christus factus est, a silent Pater Noster, and the appointed collect. The Gloria Patri is not said after each psalm.

The principal Tenebrae ceremony is the gradual extinguishing of candles upon a stand in the sanctuary called a hearse. Eventually, the Roman Rite settled on fifteen candles, one of which is extinguished after each of the nine psalms of matins and the five of lauds. The six altar candles are put out during the Benedictus, gradually reducing also the lighting in the church throughout the chanting of the canticle. Then any remaining lights in the church are extinguished and the last candle on the hearse is hidden behind the altar (if the altar is such as does not hide the light, the candle, still lit, is put inside a candle lantern), ending the service in total darkness. The strepitus (Latin for "great noise"), made by slamming a book shut, banging a hymnal or breviary against the pew, or stomping on the floor, symbolizes the earthquake that followed Christ's death, although it may have originated as a simple signal to depart. After the candle has been shown to the people, it is extinguished, and then put "on the credence table", or simply taken to the sacristy. All rise and then leave in silence.

==== Table illustrating the contents of the service ====
The 1 November 1911 reform of the Roman Breviary by Pope Pius X radically reorganized the weekly recitation of the Psalter. In the Tridentine Roman Breviary of Pope Pius V (1568), Psalms 62/63 and 66/67 (treated as a single unit) and Psalms 148–150 (again treated as a single unit) were recited at lauds every day of the week. Pius X eliminated such repetitions and provided a quite different choice of psalms for lauds.

The situation before the 1911 reform is illustrated in 19th-century publications such as Prosper Guéranger's Passiontide and Holy Week, (Dublin 1870) and The Complete Office of Holy Week According to the Roman Missal and Breviary, in Latin and English (Benziger 1875). It is more difficult to find similar online 20th-century publication, but the text of the Tenebrae services as reformed by Pope Pius X in 1911 is available in the 1924 edition of the Liber Usualis. The 1961 edition, with English rubrics and explanations, is available on more than one site.

(note: Psalm numbering as in the Vulgate)	Maundy Thursday	Good Friday	Holy Saturday	Practices
(note: Psalm numbering as in the Vulgate)	Matins			
(note: Psalm numbering as in the Vulgate)	First Nocturn (readings from the Lamentations of Jeremiah)			
Antiphon	Zelus domus	Astiterunt reges terrae	In pace	
Psalm	Psalm 68 (Psalm 68)	Psalm 2 (Psalm 2)	Psalm 4 (Psalm 4)	1st candle extinguished at end
Antiphon	Avertantur retrorsum	Diviserunt sibi	Habitabit in tabernaculo	
Psalm	Psalm 69 (Psalm 69)	Psalm 21 (Psalm 21)	Psalm 14 (Psalm 14)	2nd candle extinguished
Antiphon	Deus meus eripe me	Insurrexerunt in me	Caro mea	
Psalm	Psalm 70	Psalm 26	Psalm 15	3rd candle extinguished at end
Versicle	Avertantur retrorsum	Diviserunt sibi	In pace in idipsum	
	Our Father (silent)			
1st reading	Lamentations 1:1–1:5	Lamentations 2:8–2:11	Lamentations 3:22–3:30	
1st responsory	In monte Oliveti	Omnes amici mei	Sicut ovis	
2nd reading	Lamentations 1:6–1:9	Lamentations 2:12–2:15	Lamentations 4:1–4:6	
2nd responsory	Tristis est anima mea	Velum templi	Jerusalem surge	
3rd reading	Lamentations 1:10–1:14	Lamentations 3:1–3:9	Lamentations 5:1–5:11	
3rd responsory	Ecce vidimus	Vinea mea	Plange quasi virgo	
	Second Nocturn (readings from Saint Augustine's Commentaries on the Psalms)			
Antiphon	Liberavit Dominus	Vim faciebant	Elevamini	
Psalm	Psalm 71	Psalm 37	Psalm 23	4th candle extinguished at end
Antiphon	Cogitaverunt impii	Confundantur	Credo videre	
Psalm	Psalm 72	Psalm 39	Psalm 26	5th candle extinguished at end
Antiphon	Exsurge, Domine	Alieni insurrexerunt	Domine, abstraxisti	
Psalm	Psalm 73	Psalm 53	Psalm 29	6th candle extinguished at end
Versicle	Deus meus, eripe me	Insurrexerunt in me	Tu autem	
	Our Father (silent)			
4th reading	from Comm. on Psalm 54	from Commentary on Psalm 63		
4th responsory	Amicus meus	Tamquam ad latronem	Recessit pastor noster	
5th reading	from Comm. on Psalm 54	from Commentary on Psalm 63		
5th responsory	Judas mercator pessimus	Tenebrae factae sunt	O vos omnes	
6th reading	from Comm. on Psalm 54	from Commentary on Psalm 63		
6th responsory	Unus ex discipulis	Animam meam dilectam	Ecce quomodo	
	Third Nocturn (readings from two New Testament epistles)			
Antiphon	Dixi iniquis	Ab insurgentibus	Deus adjuvat me	
Psalm	Psalm 74	Psalm 58	Psalm 53	7th candle extinguished at end
Antiphon	Terra tremuit	Longe fecisti	In pace factus	
Psalm	Psalm 75	Psalm 87	Psalm 75	8th candle extinguished at end
Antiphon	In die tribulationis	Captabunt	Factus sum	
Psalm	Psalm 76	Psalm 93	Psalm 87	9th candle extinguished at end
Versicle	Exsurge, Domine	Locuti sunt adversum me	In pace factus est	
	Our Father (silent)			
7th reading	1 Corinthians 11:17–11:22	Hebrews 4:11–4:15	Hebrews 9:11–9:14	
7th responsory	Eram quasi agnus innocens	Tradiderunt me	Astiterunt reges terrae	
8th reading	1 Corinthians 11:23–11:26	Hebrews 4:16–5:3	Hebrews 9:15–9:18	
8th responsory	Una hora	Jesum tradidit	Aestimatus sum	
9th reading	1 Corinthians 11:27–11:34	Hebrews 5:4–5:10	Hebrews 9:19–9:22	
9th responsory	Seniores populi	Caligaverunt oculi mei	Sepulto Domino	
	Lauds			
Antiphon	Justificeris, Domine	Proprio Filio	O mors	
Psalm	Psalm 50 (Miserere)			10th candle extinguished at end
Antiphon	Dominus tamquam ovis	Anxiatus est	Plangent eum	
Psalm	Psalm 89	Psalm 142	Psalm 91 (pre-1912); Psalm 91 (from 1912)	11th candle extinguished at end
Antiphon	Contritum est cor meum	Ait latro ad latronem	Attendite	
Psalm	Psalms 62+66 (pre-1912); Psalm 35 (from 1912)	Psalms 62+66 (pre-1912); Psalm 84 (from 1912)	Psalms 62+66 (pre-1912); Psalm 63 (from 1912)	12th candle extinguished at end
Antiphon	Exhortatus es	Dum conturbata	A porta inferi	
Old Testament canticle	Canticle of Moses; Exodus 15:1–15:18	Canticle of Habacuc; Habakkuk 3:2–3:19	Canticle of Ezechias; Isaiah 38:10–38:20	13th candle extinguished at end
Antiphon	Oblatus est	Memento mei	O vos omnes qui transitis	
Psalm	Psalms 148+149+150 (pre-1912); Psalm 146 (from 1912)	Psalms 148+149+150 (pre-1912); Psalm 147 (from 1912)	Psalms 148+149+150 (pre-1912); Psalm 150 (from 1912)	14th candle extinguished at end
Versicle	Homo pacis meae	Collocavit me	Caro mea	
Antiphon	Traditor autem	Posuerunt super caput	Mulieres sedentes	
Benedictus	Canticle of Zachary; Luke 1:68–1:79			Altar candles extinguished at different verses of Benedictus; Last burning candle hidden after repeat of antiphon
	Christus factus est (based on Philippians 2:8–2:9)			
	Our Father (silent)			
	Psalm 50 (Miserere), omitted after 1955			
Prayer	Respice quaesumus			Followed by strepitus; last candle brought back

==== Music ====
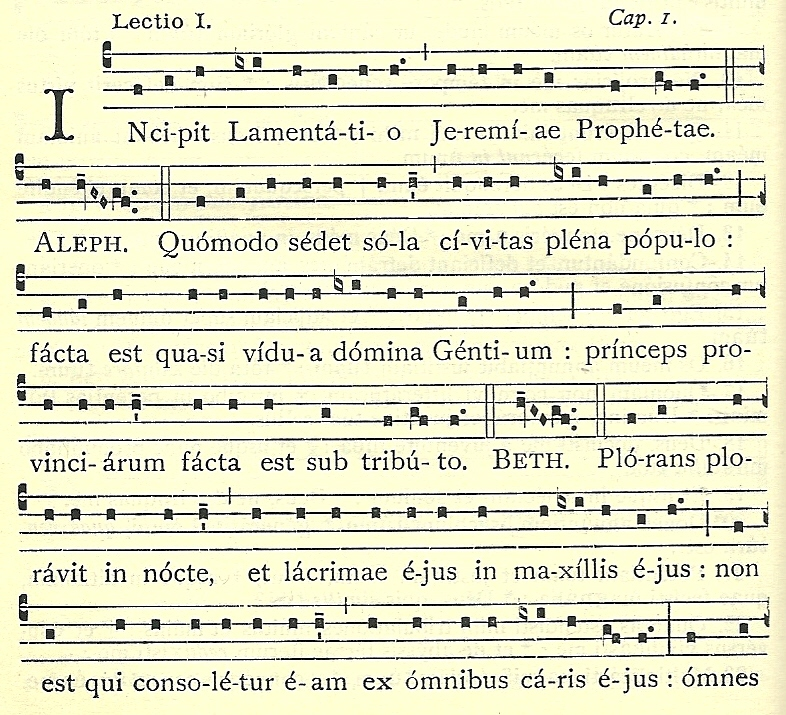
"The saddest melody within the whole range of music": the opening of the Tenebrae chanting of the Book of Lamentations of the Prophet Jeremiah

The lessons of the first nocturn at matins are taken on all three days from the Book of Lamentations and are sung to a specific Gregorian reciting tone, which has been called "the saddest melody within the whole range of music". The Lamentations of Jeremiah the Prophet have been set to polyphonic music by many composers, including Palestrina, Tallis and Lassus. Such High-Renaissance polyphonic choral settings of Lamentations at Tenebrae, culminating in those of Lassus (1584), share the same texts with, but in musical idiom are to be distinguished from, the French Baroque genre of Leçons de ténèbres, as composed by Marc-Antoine Charpentier (54 settings, H.91 - H.144), Michel Lambert, and François Couperin. In the 20th century Ernst Krenek wrote a Lamentatio Jeremiae prophetae, Op. 93 (1941–1942), and Igor Stravinsky composed Threni (1957–1958).

Each day, the lessons of the second nocturn are from writings of St. Augustine, and the lessons of the third nocturn from two New Testament epistles. These are chanted to the ordinary lesson tone and have been relatively neglected by composers, though there are a few settings by Manuel Cardoso, and an accompanying melody set in form of recitative attributed to Manoel Dias de Oliveira, used in a few brazilian cities.

The Tenebrae responsories have been set by, among others, Lassus, Gesualdo, Victoria, Marc-Antoine Charpentier, Francesco Antonio Vallotti, Jan Dismas Zelenka, and José Maria Xavier. Gregorio Allegri's setting of the Miserere psalm, to be sung at the Tenebrae Lauds, is one of the best known compositions for the service. Also Gesualdo includes a setting of that psalm in his Responsoria et alia ad Officium Hebdomadae Sanctae spectantia, along with a setting of the Benedictus.

=== Roman Rite since 1970 ===
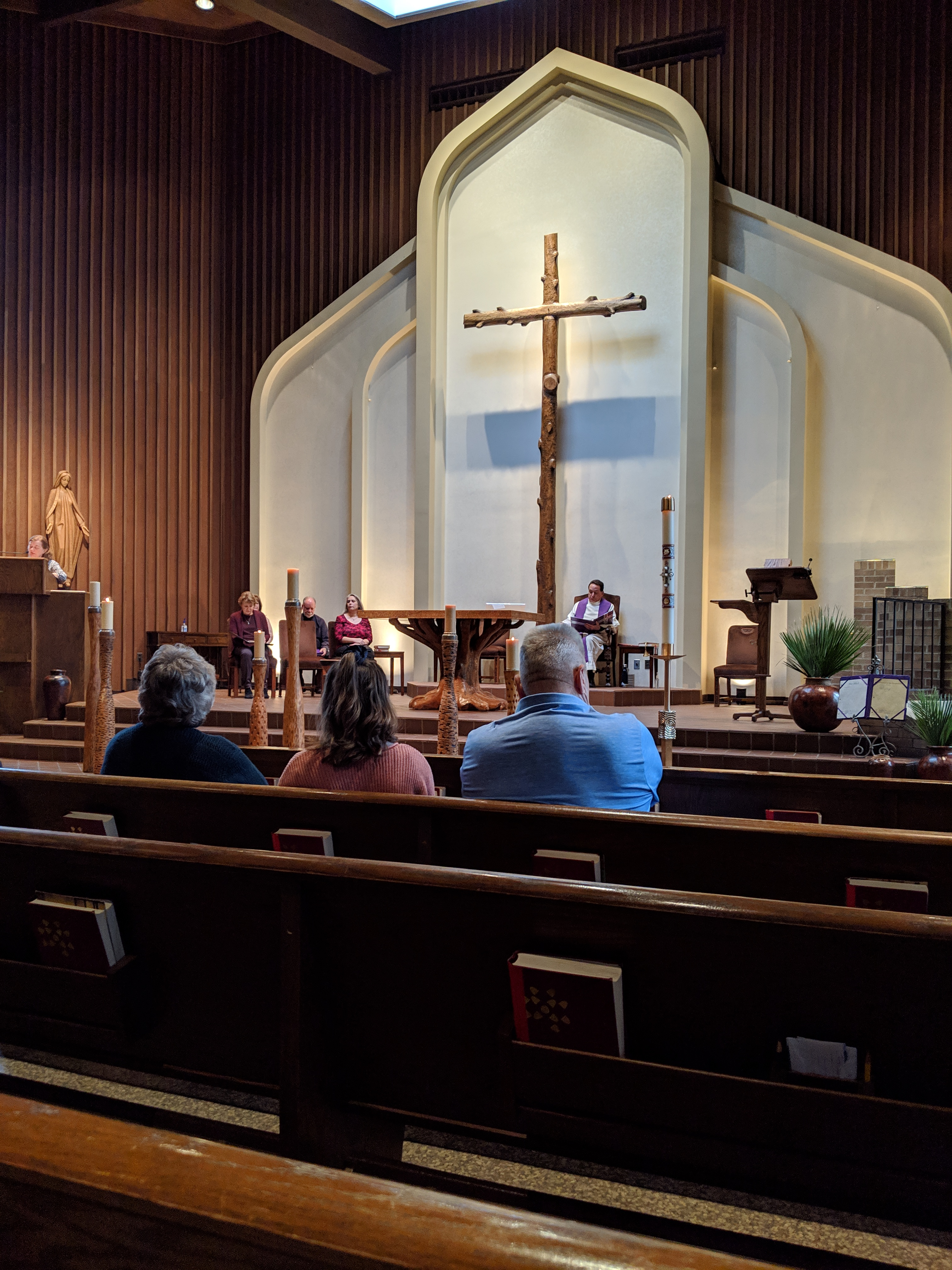
A modern Tenebrae service in on Spy Wednesday in Streetsboro, Ohio, 2019. It has been adapted, for instance, by replacing the 15-candle hearse with individual candlesticks for a much smaller number of candles and omitting the six altar candles.

After the 1970 revision of the Roman Breviary, now called the Liturgy of the Hours, a 1988 circular letter from the Congregation for Divine Worship recommended communal celebration of the Office of Readings and Morning Prayer − which were formerly called matins and lauds − on Good Friday and Holy Saturday, and remarked that this office was "formerly called 'Tenebrae'". The General Instruction of the Liturgy of the Hours says: "Before morning Lauds on Good Friday and Holy Saturday, the Office of Readings is, if possible, to be celebrated publicly and with the people taking part." The Ceremonial of Bishops (1984) says: "It is also desirable that, if at all possible, the bishop take part with the clergy and people in the office of readings and morning prayer on Good Friday and Holy Saturday." The Office of Readings and Morning Prayer have only 6 psalms (3 in either hour), not the older form's 14, after each of which a candle was extinguished. The readings are no longer 3, divided into 9 sections, but 2 longer readings, and there is provision for extending the Office of Readings on more solemn occasions. In the older form, liturgical practice on those days differed from that on other days, even those of Lent: for instance, Gloria Patri was not included at the end of psalms and responsories. The office of Tenebrae was abandoned at the Church of the Holy Sepulchre in Jerusalem only in 1977 − although the rule against anticipation of Matins and Lauds to the previous evening was already in effect there − because the times of Catholic Holy Week services had to remain unchanged due to the established rights of other churches.

Summorum Pontificum (2007) permits clerics bound to recitation of the Divine Office to use the 1961 Roman Breviary. Several religious and secular institutes and societies of apostolic life have availed themselves of this permission. The 1955 and 1960 changes incorporated into that edition of the Breviary continue to exclude anticipation of matins and lauds to the previous evening, whether celebrated with or without the Tenebrae ceremonies.

Services called Tenebrae, differing in several respects from the original form and not necessarily connected with Holy Week, are held even where the pre-Vatican II 1961 Roman Breviary is not used:

- The Jesuit Institute provides a service, denominated Tenebrae, without psalms and not necessarily in darkness, in which a candle is extinguished after the reading of each of seven Scripture passages related to the Passion of Jesus.
- A modified Tenebrae service that leaves the church in darkness is done by the Canons Regular of Saint John Cantius in Chicago.
- Several Catholic cathedrals and other churches arrange one-off services with Gregorian chant and polyphonic music from the traditional Tenebrae service, sometimes as an evening concert.

Unlike the original well-attended Tenebrae, these modern adaptations have attracted little attention on the part of musical composers.

== Other Western Christian Churches ==
The front cover of a Lutheran church bulletin for Good Friday, describing the significance, as well as the summary of components, of a typical Tenebrae service

Some Protestant denominations retained elements of the Roman Tenebrae liturgy, or added others. The Tenebrae services in the Lutheran and Anglican traditions, as well as in Methodist and Reformed (inclusive of Continental Reformed, Presbyterian and Congregationalist denominations) churches that hold them, all contain "the pattern of extinguishing the candles (and the overhead lights) and restoring the Christ candle", along with the strepitus. Some liturgical Baptist congregations also hold Tenebrae Services. Variations of Tenebrae are sometimes celebrated in less formal or non-denominational churches as well.

=== Lutheran practice ===
In Lutheran churches that observe the celebration, the Tenebrae service is typically held on Holy Wednesday (Spy Wednesday) as the following days that form the Paschal Triduum (The Three Days) have set liturgies; for Lutheran churches that hold the Tenebrae on Good Friday, it is typically done in the evening, as the main Good Friday liturgy (Swedish: Långfredagens gudstjänst) is held at 3 pm. During the Tenebrae, there is a gradual dimming of the lights and extinguishing of the candles as the service progresses. Toward the end of the service, the Christ candle, if present, is removed from the sanctuary. A concluding Strepitus, or loud noise, typically made by slamming shut the Bible, is made, symbolizing the earthquake that took place, and the agony of creation, at the death of Christ.

Certain Tenebrae responsory settings have led their own life in Lutheran practice, for instance:

- Jacob Handl's Ecce quomodo moritur justus
- The Tristis est anima mea setting attributed to Johann Kuhnau

=== Anglican practice ===
Most Anglican churches that celebrate the Tenebrae service do so only on Spy Wednesday, so as not to deflect attention from the Maundy Thursday and Good Friday practices. But this practice is not universal.

In its Book of Occasional Services, the Episcopal Church (United States) provides for a single Tenebrae service on Holy Wednesday in the evening. That service preserves the number of nine Tenebrae lessons, each followed by a responsory. Church Publishing also offers a booklet called, In the Shadows of Holy Week: The Office of Tenebrae. It provides the full ancient form of Tenebrae as it appears in basic outline in The Book of Occasional Services. This booklet develops that outline providing all of the materials necessary for a recitation of the office: All of the psalms, canticles, responsories, antiphons, and readings are reproduced in full. Rubrics guide participants through each phase of the service.

Parishes of the Anglican Church of Canada that do celebrate Tenebrae follow a variety of practices. The Church of St. Mary Magdalene (Toronto) is notable for the excellence of its music, of which the musical Tenebrae services are exemplary. Christ Church Cathedral (Fredericton) uses Tenebrae in a sung traditional language form on the Wednesday evening of Holy Week which includes lessons from Jeremiah with responding psalms, the fourth being from John 17, and Benedictus. At the Church of the Epiphany (Oakville) Tenebrae is described as the reversal of the Advent wreath: "starting Lent with the brightness of six candles, the darkness grows as a candle is extinguished each week in anticipation of Jesus dying on the cross on Good Friday." This abbreviated Tenebrae liturgy begins worship services on Sundays during Lent. The Sisterhood of Saint John the Divine have their own liturgy, "The Order of Tenebrae", published in 1933.

=== Methodist practice ===
Certain congregations of Methodist denominations, such as the Free Methodist Church, Global Methodist Church and United Methodist Church, observe a Tenebare service. In those churches that choose to observe it, the United Methodist Book of Worship specifies that fourteen candles, along with a central Christ candle, are lit on the Tenebrae hearse after the Opening Prayer. They are consequently extinguished after each of the Tenebrae lessons. Prior to the reading of the sixteenth lesson, the Christ candle on the Tenebrae hearse is extinguished and then the church bells are tolled. The sixteenth lesson is read in darkness, followed by the conclusion of the liturgy.

=== Polish National Catholic practice ===
The Polish National Catholic service usually takes place on Good Friday, mostly at night. A standing cross is put on the altar with a black veil over it and 12 to 14 candles are placed behind it. The service has a combination of Bitter Lamentations, Matins, and Vespers. Several of the PNCC clergy, vested with cantors, are seated at the high place and the service is chanted. Gradually, a minor cleric puts out each candle except for the top one that is taken around the sanctuary into the vestry. At that time a moment of silence is held for Christ's death. Then the candle is placed back; the lights in the church are turned back on; and the final hymns are sung.

=== Reformed practice ===
Congregationalist versions of Tenebrae service, particularly on Maundy Thursday or Good Friday, often contain readings from the gospels which describe the time between the Last Supper and the Passion of Christ.

=== Western Orthodox practice ===
Some Western Rite Orthodox parishes observe the service of Tenebrae. Among the Byzantine Rite Orthodox the nearest equivalent is Matins of Great Friday, when a candlestick with 12 candles is set up in the center of the temple behind the analogion from which the Twelve Passion Gospels are read. However, here after each reading one of the candles is lit rather than extinguished.
