= Sept Répons des ténèbres =

French sacred music

- Sacred music by Francis Poulenc
- Catalogue: FP 181
- Text: Responsories
- Language: Latin
- Composed: 1961-62
- Performed: April 11, 1963: New York City
- Scoring: soprano; mixed choir; orchestra

Sept Répons des ténèbres (Seven Responsories for Tenebrae), FP 181, is a piece of sacred music composed by Francis Poulenc in 1961. He wrote the work in seven movements on Latin texts from the Responsories for the Holy Week and scored it for soprano, choir, and orchestra. Written on a commission from the New York Philharmonic, it was first performed in New York's Lincoln Center in April 1963 after the composer's death.

== History ==
Poulenc returned to sacred music first in 1936 when he composed his Litanies à la Vierge Noire, FP 82, followed in 1937 by his missa brevis Messe en sol majeur (Mass in G), and several other religious works. His 1956 opera Dialogues of the Carmelites deals with the fate of nuns in the French Revolution.

Sept répons des ténèbres was written in 1961 on a commission by Leonard Bernstein and the New York Philharmonic for the opening of the new concert hall in Lincoln Center, then called Philharmonic Hall, later known as the Avery Fisher Hall.

Poulenc composed first a version for voices and piano in 1961 and orchestrated the work in 1962. The first performance was on 11 April 1963, after the composer's death, by choir and orchestra of the New York Philharmonic, conducted by Thomas Schippers.

The first performance in France was at the Théâtre des Champs-Élysées in Paris on 10 December 1963, with the Orchestre National de France, Les Petits chanteurs de la Sainte-Croix and the choirs of RTF, conducted by Georges Prêtre.

== Text, structure and scoring ==
The work is based on Latin texts from the Responsories for the Holy Week. The seven movements of Sept Répons des ténèbres are:

1. Una hora non potuistis vigilare mecum
2. Judas, mercator pessimus
3. Jesum tradidit
4. Caligaverunt oculi mei
5. Tenebrae factae sunt
6. Sepulto Domino
7. Ecce quomodo moritur justus

The first movement reflects Jesus in Gethsemane in a responsory for the third nocturn of Maundy Thursday, "Una hora non potuistis vigilare mecum" (What, could you not watch one hour with me).

The second movement is focused on Judas, a responsory for the second nocturn of Maundy Thursday, "Judas, mercator pessimus" (Judas, the vile merchant).

The third and fourth movement are taken from the responsories for the third nocturn of Good Friday, "Jesum tradidit impius" (The wicked man betrayed Jesus) and "Caligaverunt oculi mei" (My eyes are darkened).

The fifth movement is for the second nocturn of Good Friday, "Tenebrae factae sunt" (Darkness fell);

The sixth is for the third nocturn of Holy Saturday, "Sepulto Domino" (The Lord being buried);

and the final movement is for the second nocturn of Holy Saturday, "Ecce quomodo moritur justus" (Behold how the righteous man dies).

Poulenc scored the music for boys' choir with a treble soloist and symphony orchestra. Later performances added female singers for the solo part and in the choir.

== Recording ==
For a long time, the recording by Prêtre was the only one, until the work was recorded again in 2012 by Carolyn Sampson, the Cappella Amsterdam and the Estonian Philharmonic Chamber Choir and the Estonian National Symphony Orchestra, conducted by Daniel Reuss. A reviewer notes the music's "dark and extremely sombre character", expressing a wide range of emotions, facing the crucifixion in sorrow and distress.

== Bibliography ==
- Bossert, Dorothea (25 March 2014). "Bestechende Präzision und Klangkultur" (PDF) (in German). SWR. Archived from the original (PDF) on 25 March 2014.
- Cookson, Michael (2014). "Francis Poulenc (1899–1963) / Stabat Mater (1950) / Sept Répons des Ténèbres (1961/62)". musicweb-international.com.
- Schmidt, Carl B. (1995). The Music of Francis Poulenc (1899–1963): A Catalogue. Oxford: Clarendon Press. ISBN 978-0-19-816336-7.
- Sept répons des ténèbres . FP 181 / liturgie (in French). BNF. 2017.
- "Sept Répons des ténèbres de Francis Poulenc" (in French). gloriamusica.fr. 2017. Archived from the original on 2 February 2017.
