= Holy Wednesday =

Christian commemoration

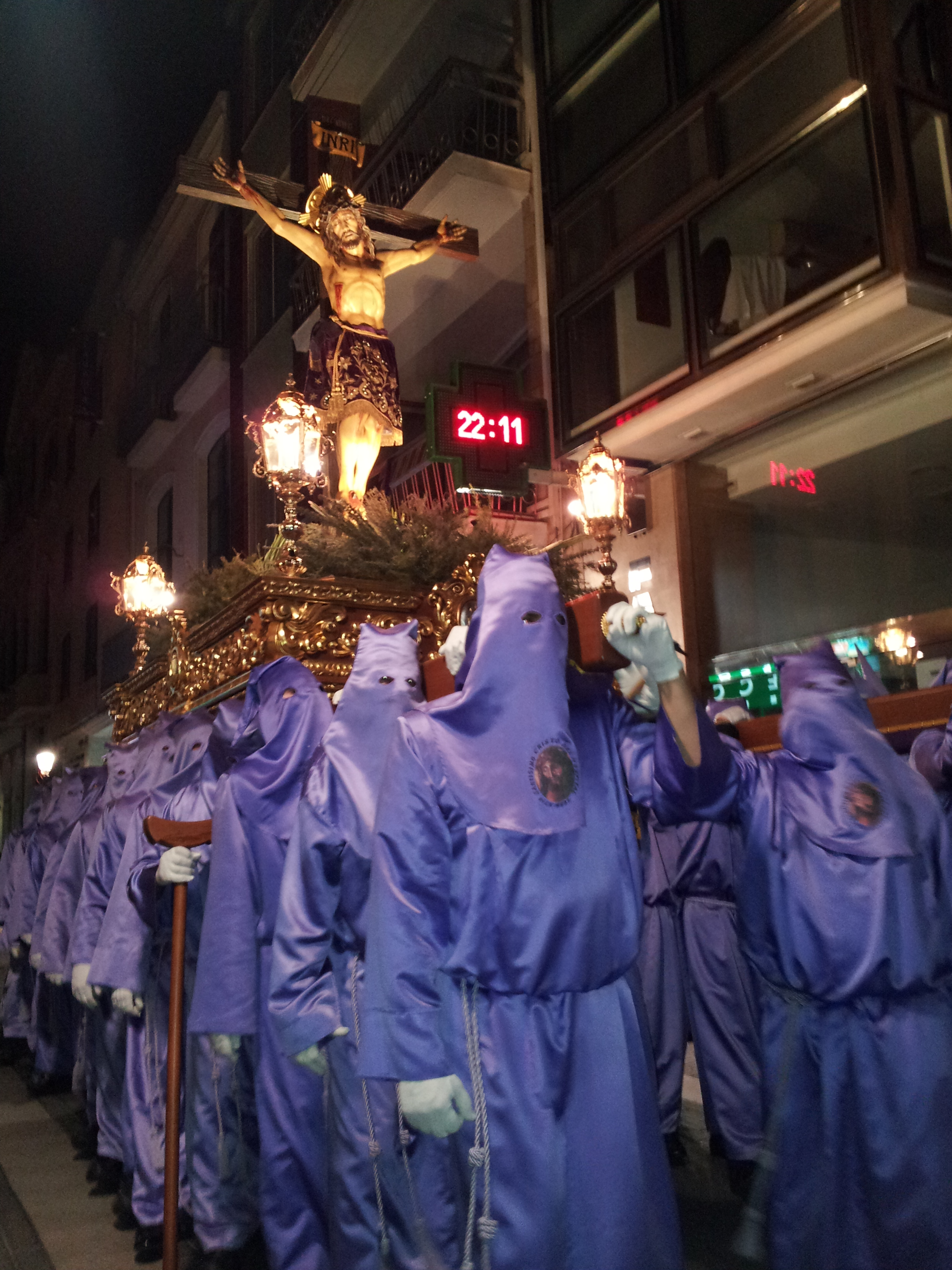
- A confraternity of penitents leads a Holy Wednesday procession in Villarreal, Spain (2015)
- Also called: Spy Wednesday; Good Wednesday; Holy and Great Wednesday
- Observed by: Christians
- Type: Christian
- Significance: commemorates the Bargain of Judas and the Parable of the Two Debtors
- Observances: Mass; Tenebrae
- Date: Wednesday before Easter
- 2025 date: April 16 (Western); April 16 (Eastern)
- 2026 date: April 1 (Western); April 8 (Eastern)
- 2027 date: March 24 (Western); April 28 (Eastern)
- 2028 date: April 12 (Western); April 12 (Eastern)
- Frequency: annual
- Related to: Holy Week

Miércoles Santo (Holy Wednesday) in Cádiz, Spain

In Christianity, Holy Wednesday commemorates the Bargain of Judas as a clandestine spy among the disciples. It is also called Spy Wednesday, or Good Wednesday (in Western Christianity), and Great and Holy Wednesday (in Eastern Christianity).

In Western Christianity, many churches of various denominations observe the tenebrae service on Holy Wednesday.

== Biblical narratives ==
In the New Testament account of Holy Week, after Palm Sunday, the Sanhedrin gathered and plotted to kill Jesus before the feast of Pesach. On the Wednesday before his death, Jesus was in Bethany, in the house of Simon the Leper. As he sat at the supper table with his disciples, a woman named Mary anointed Jesus' head and feet with a costly oil of spikenard. The disciples were indignant, asking why the oil was not instead sold and the money given to the poor. But Judas Iscariot wanted to keep the money for himself. Then Judas went to the Sanhedrin and offered to deliver Jesus to them in exchange for money. From this moment on, Judas sought an opportunity to betray Jesus.

In reference to Judas Iscariot's intent to betray Jesus, formed on Holy Wednesday, the day is sometimes called "Spy Wednesday". The word spy, as used in the term, means "ambush, ambuscade, snare". Additionally, among the disciples, Judas clandestinely was a spy and Wednesday was the day he chose to betray Jesus.

== Liturgy ==
=== Western Christianity ===
==== Catholic Church ====
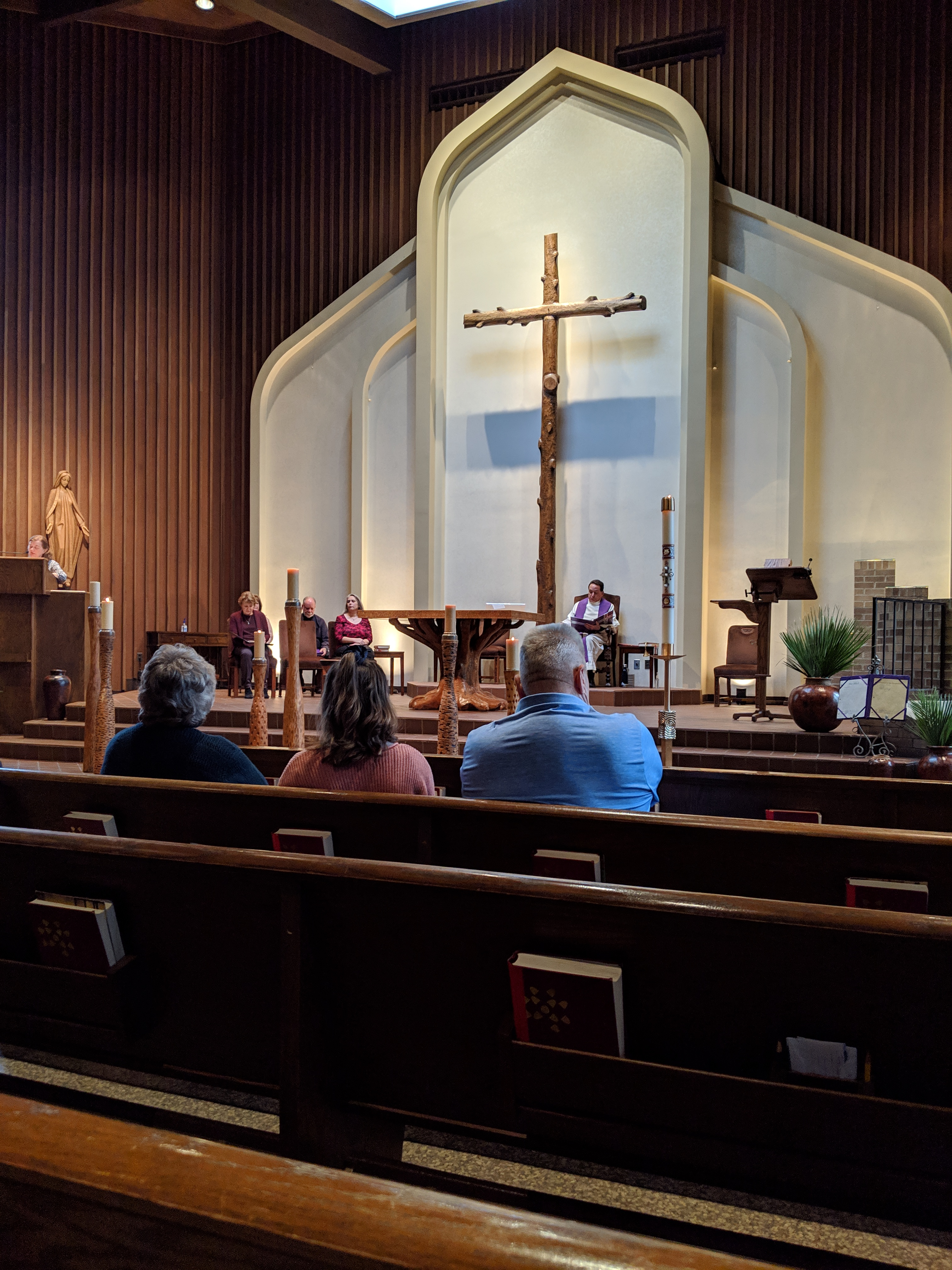
A Tenebrae service held at a Roman Catholic parish church on Spy Wednesday (2019)

Today, the term "Tenebrae" refers to a Holy Week service usually held on Spy Wednesday that involves the gradual extinguishing of candles on a Tenebrae hearse, readings related to the Passion of Jesus, and the strepitus (loud noise).

Prior to the Second Vatican Council, the Tenebrae liturgy of matins and lauds of Maundy Thursday (Holy Thursday) used to be celebrated in the afternoon or evening of Good Wednesday. The name comes from the Latin word tenebrae, meaning darkness. In this service, all the candles on a special candelabra and on the altar were gradually extinguished except for one. This was then hidden and the church was left in complete darkness. Next, after recitation of Psalms 50–51 and a special prayer, a loud noise (in Latin strepitus) was made, which was originally a signal for the ministers to depart but was later interpreted as symbolizing the confusion and terror that accompanied the death of Jesus, including the earthquake that, according to the Gospel of Matthew 27:51, followed. A similar celebration of matins and lauds of Good Friday and Holy Saturday used to be held towards the close of each of the preceding days. This custom is still retained by those Catholic Churches which celebrate the pre-1955 Holy Week Reforms.

In the older form of the Mass known as the Tridentine Mass the readings for Holy Wednesday are taken from Isaiah 62:11; 63:1–7 and the Gospel according to St. Luke 22:1–71; 23:1–53. In the 1955 Holy Week Reform, the first 38 verses of the 22nd chapter of St. Luke were removed. Those 38 verses are retained in the Roman Catholic Churches which celebrate the pre-1955 Holy Week. In the ordinary form of the Roman Rite the readings on Holy Wednesday are Isaiah 50.4–9a and Matthew 26.14–25.

==== Lutheran Churches ====
Lutheran churches hold services on Holy Wednesday, often in the form of the Tenebrae.

==== Anglican Churches ====
In the Episcopal Church in the United States, a member of the Anglican Communion, the office of Tenebrae is celebrated on Spy Wednesday.

==== Methodist Churches ====
In traditional Methodist usage, The Book of Worship for Church and Home (1965) provides the following Collect for Spy Wednesday:

Assist us mercifully with thy help, O Lord God our salvation, that we may enter with joy upon the meditation of those mighty acts through which thou hast given unto us life and immortality; through Jesus Christ our Lord. Amen.

On the evening of Spy Wednesday, many Methodist churches observe the Tenebrae service.

=== Eastern Christianity ===
==== Byzantine Rite ====
In the Byzantine Rite (used by Eastern Orthodox, certain Eastern Catholic and Eastern Lutheran churches), the theme of Holy and Great Wednesday is the commemoration of the sinful woman who anointed Jesus before his crucifixion and Burial; a second theme is the agreement to betray Jesus made by Judas Iscariot.

The day begins at vespers to which may be joined the celebration of the Presanctified Liturgy; typically, this is now performed Tuesday morning or afternoon. At this service, many of the hymns sung at matins are repeated. The readings tell of the finding of Moses and the sufferings of Job. The Gospel tells a number of parables about the Second Coming, including the parable of the Wise and Foolish Virgins.

Later that evening (in parish practice) or early the following morning, the matins follows the special format known as the Bridegroom Service which is used the first three days of Holy Week. The Gospel is a passage from John 12 about Jesus revealing himself to some Greeks. Towards the end of matins, the Hymn of Kassiani is sung. The hymn, (written in the 9th century by Kassia) tells of the woman who washed Christ's feet in the house of Simon the Leper (Luke 7:36–50). Much of the hymn is written from the perspective of the sinful woman:

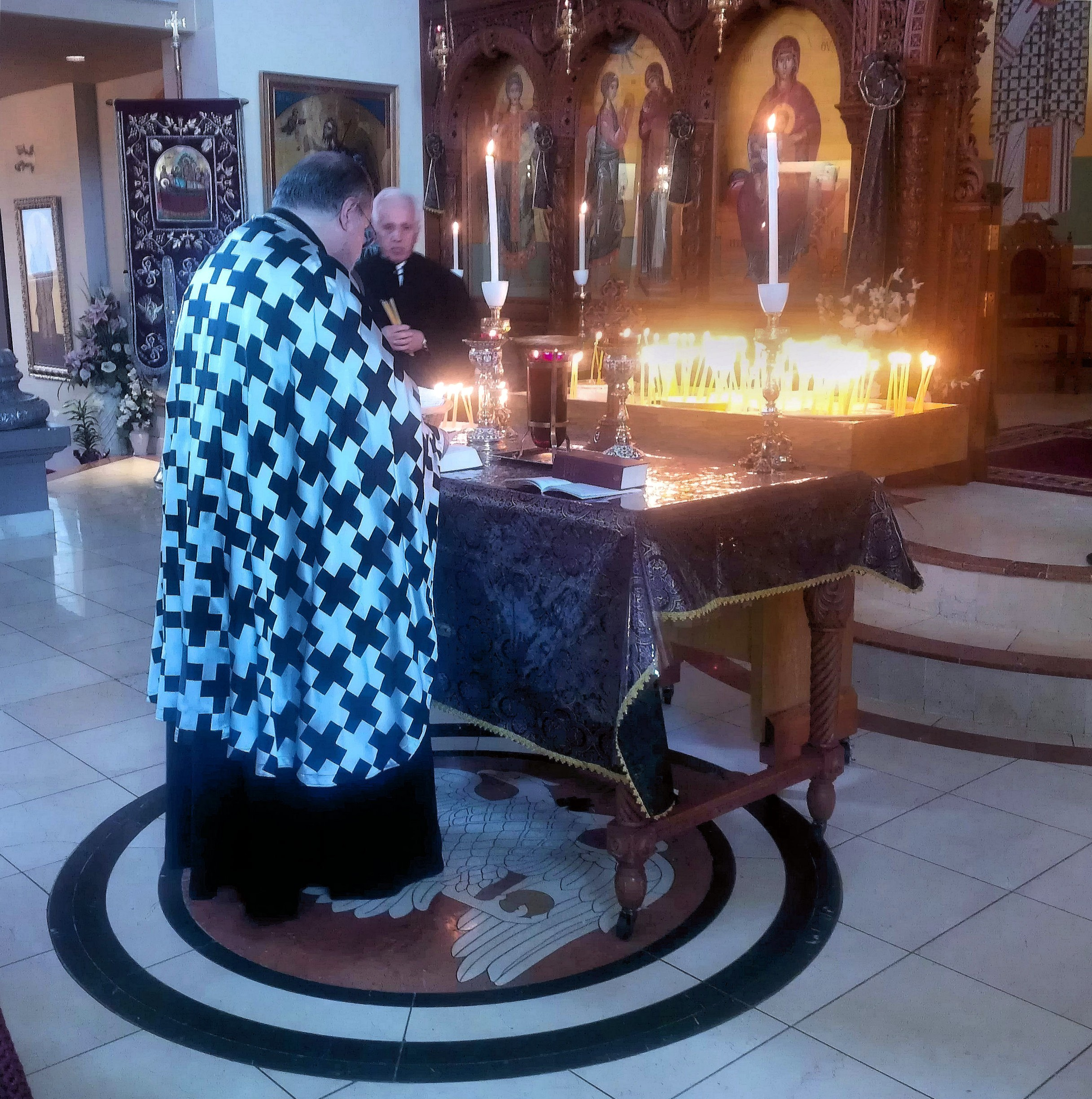
Service of the Sacrament of Holy Unction

O Lord, the woman who had fallen into many sins, sensing Your Divinity, takes upon herself the duty of a myrrh-bearer. With lamentations she brings you myrrh in anticipation of your entombment. "Woe to me!" she cries, "for me night has become a frenzy of licentiousness, a dark and moonless love of sin. Receive the fountain of my tears, O You who gather into clouds the waters of the sea. Incline unto me, unto the sighings of my heart, O You who bowed the heavens by your ineffable condescension. I will wash your immaculate feet with kisses and dry them again with the tresses of my hair; those very feet at whose sound Eve hid herself in fear when she heard You walking in Paradise in the twilight of the day. As for the multitude of my sins and the depths of Your judgments, who can search them out, O Savior of souls, my Savior? Do not disdain me Your handmaiden, O You who are boundless in mercy.

Where Byzantine music is used, the composition expresses the poetry so strongly that it often leaves many people in a state of prayerful tears. The Hymn can last upwards of 25 minutes and is liturgically and musically a highpoint of the entire year.

At vespers, to which may be joined the celebration of the Presanctified Liturgy, and which, strictly speaking, is the liturgical beginning of Holy Thursday, many of the hymns sung at matins are repeated. The readings tell of Moses' killing of the Egyptian and Job refusing to curse God despite his misfortunes. The Gospel tells the stories of the sinful woman and Judas' betrayal.

In Greece (and some other places the custom has spread to) all members of the church receive Holy Unction on Wednesday evening.

It is on account of the agreement made by Judas to betray Jesus on this day that Orthodox Christians fast on Wednesdays (as well as Fridays) throughout the year.

== Customs ==
Holy Wednesday and other named days and day ranges around Lent and Easter in Western Christianity, with the fasting days of Lent numbered

- Czech Republic: the day is traditionally called Ugly Wednesday, Soot-Sweeping Wednesday or Black Wednesday, because chimneys used to be swept on this day, to be clean for Easter.
- Indonesia: in Larantuka, East Flores, this day is known as Rabu Trewa (Rowdy Wednesday). People go around the town while dragging zinc plates along the paved streets. They strike the plates repeatedly while shouting "Trewa!" to commemorate the arrest of Jesus and the start of Easter Triduum.
