= Responsories (Reger) =

Responsories by Max Reger

- Choral music by Max Reger
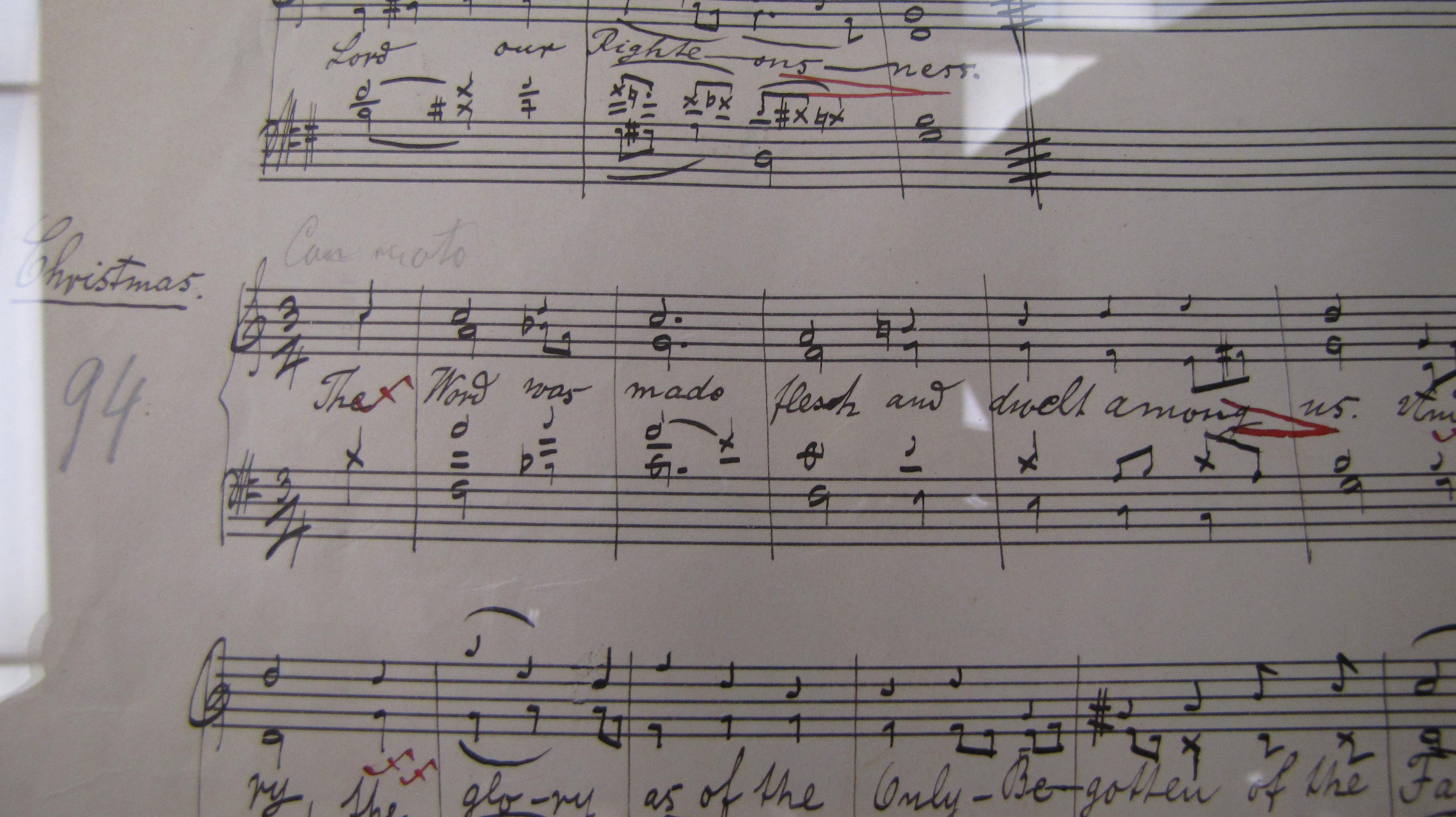
- Reger's manuscript of the Christmas responsory
- Text: Biblical
- Language: English
- Composed: 1911
- Published: 1914
- Movements: 20
- Scoring: choir a cappella

The Responsories by the German composer Max Reger are 20 short settings of mostly biblical texts in English, to be used as responsories in Lutheran church services. Composed in 1911, they were first published in Philadelphia in 1914 as The Responsories.

== History ==
Reger composed the responsories in 1911 to English texts for Luther D. Reed, a professor of liturgy who wanted to use contemporary music in services of the American Lutheran Church. Reed was interested in a return to older forms of services such as vespers which call for responsorial singing. In the summer of 1911, the organist Harry G. Archer travelled to Germany and requested a setting by Reger of the texts on Reed's behalf. Reger, who spoke no English, is reported to have asked Archer for a detailed translation, explaining the meaning of single words and marking stressed syllables. Reger wrote the music and apparently had the manuscript checked, as later changes show. The compositions were completed in September 1911. Reger's settings are intended to be sung by lay performers. They are set mainly in homophony, ensuring clear understanding of the texts.

The responsories were published in 1914 by Luther D. Reed and The Church Music and Liturgical Art Society of Philadelphia. Compared to the manuscript, the printing has several changes concerning rhythmical details and the distribution of words to the music. Reger probably never obtained a copy; at least none was found in his possession when he died. In 1961, Hermann Grabner (1886-1969) edited a critical edition for the complete edition of Reger's works, volume 27 of Max Reger: Sämtliche Werke, printed in Wiesbaden by Breitkopf & Härtel. They also published versions in German, 20 Responsorien, in five volumes of four each, and additional single copies.

A critical edition was published by Carus-Verlag in 2007, edited by Andreas Becker. In English it is based on Reger's manuscript, and in German it has slight melismas and rhythmical subdivisions. In 2013, the responsories were published by Nabu Press.

== Text and music ==
The 20 responsories are set for choir a cappella. They partly follow the liturgical year. Breitkopf & Härtel supplied versions in German.

1. Advent: "Behold, the days come" (Es kommt die Zeit, so spricht der Herr)
2. Christmas "The Word was made flesh" (Das Wort ward Fleisch)
3. Epiphany: "Arise, shine, for thy light is come" (Mach dich auf, werde Licht)
4. Passiontide: "He was brought as a lamb" (Er ward geführt wie ein Lamm zur Schlachtbank)
5. Easter: "Christ being raised from the dead" (Christ, von den Toten erweckt)
6. Ascension Day: "Go ye into all the world" (Gehet hin in alle Welt)
7. Pentecost: "And there appeared" (Und es erschienen den Aposteln Zungen)
8. Trinity: "We bless the Father" (Wir loben den Vater und den Sohn)
9. "Forever, o Lord, Thy Word is settled" (Dein Wort, o Herr, wohnt weit und ewig)
10. "We know no other God" (Wir kennen keinen andern Gott)
11. "Fear God, and keep His commandments" (Fürchte Gott und halte seine Gebote)
12. "Thine, o Lord, is the power" (Dein, o Herr, ist die Kraft)
13. "Look down, o Lord, from Thy holy place" (Sieh drein, o Herr, aus deinem Heiligtum)
14. "Bless the Lord at all times" (Preis den Herrn alle Zeiten)
15. "Make me to go in the path" (Herr, führe mich auf dem Pfad deiner Gebote)
16. Burial: "Shall we receive good" (Haben wir Gutes empfangen von Gott)
17. Burial: "I know that my Redeemer liveth" (Ich weiß, daß mein Erlöser lebet)
18. Burial: "If we believe that Jesus died" (Denn so wir glauben, daß Jesus gestorben und auferstanden ist)
19. Burial: "Behold, how the righteous dieth" (O sieh, wie der Gerechte stirbt)
20. Burial: "I will lay me down in peace and sleep" (Ich will in Frieden mich niederlegen zum Schlaf)

Five of the twenty responsories are devoted to burial, two of those using texts from the Book of Job: "Shall we receive good" (Job 2:10). and "I know that my Redeemer liveth" (Job 19:25).

== Cited sources ==
- Becker, Alexander (2007). Max Reger / Responsorien / für Chor SATB a cappella (PDF) (in German). Carus-Verlag. pp. 1–24.
- Fromme, Daniel (2016). Die Hiob-Rezeption in der Musik des 20. Jahrhunderts: Zur Musikalisierung des Leidens (in German). LIT Verlag Münster. pp. 112–113. ISBN 978-3-64-313264-2.
- "20 Responsorien". Breitkopf & Härtel.
- "Responsories / for choir SATB a cappella". Carus-Verlag.
- "Dr. Andreas Becker". Max-Reger-Institute. 2018.
- "The Responsories: Musical Setting – Primary Source Edition". Nabu Press. 2013.
- Grabner, Hermann (ed.). "Sämtliche Werke. Max Reger. Unter Mitarb. des Max-Reger-Instituts (Elsa-Reger-Stiftung), Bonn" (in German). leo.bw.de.
