= Sanchidrián =

- municipality
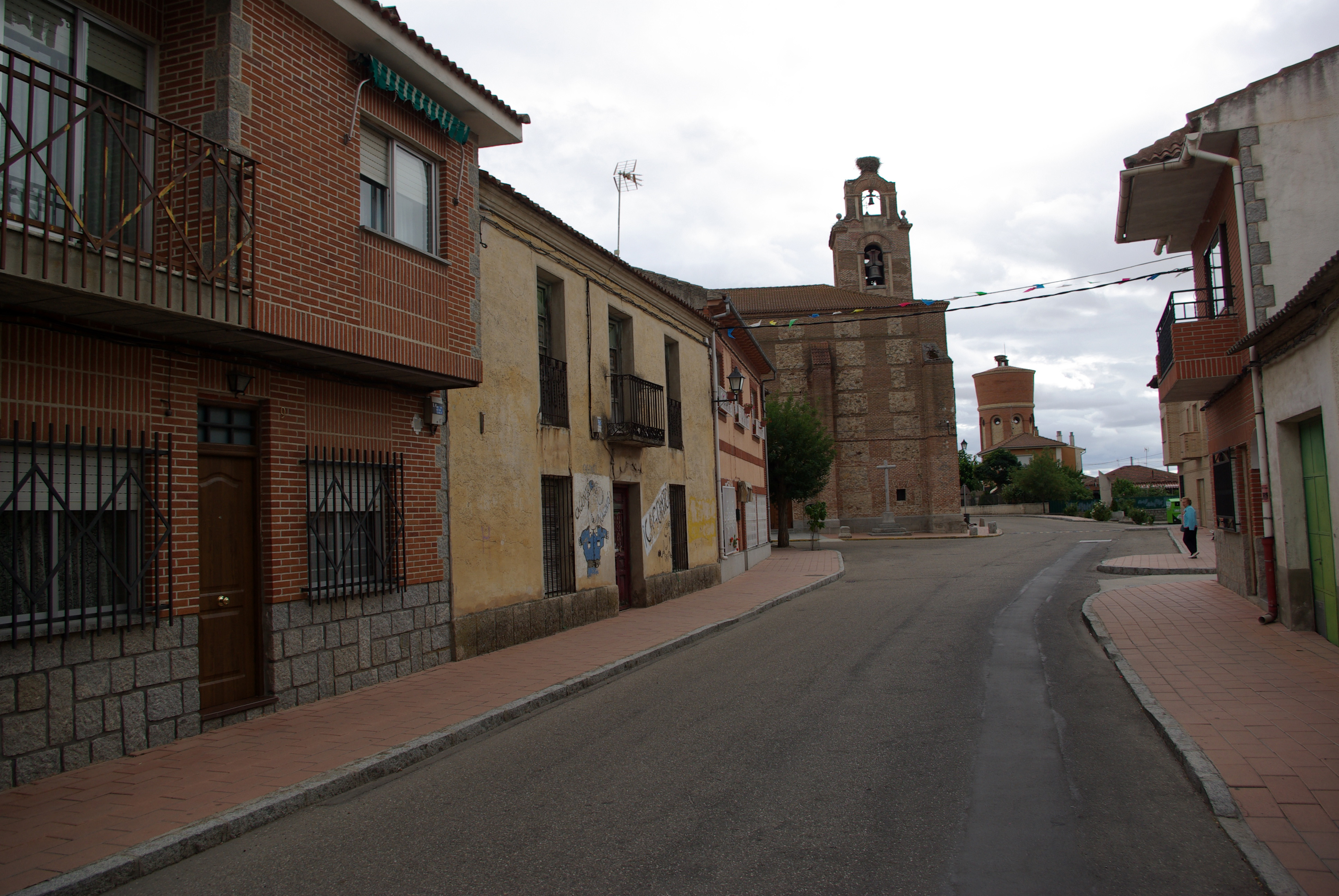

- Flag Coat of arms

- Location in Spain. Sanchidrián (Spain)
- Coordinates: 40°53′31″N 4°34′53″W
- Country: Spain
- Autonomous community: Castile and León
- Province: Ávila
- Municipality: Sanchidrián

Area
  - Total: 26 km^{2} (10 sq mi)

Population (2025-01-01)
  - Total: 720
  - Density: 28/km^{2} (72/sq mi)
- Time zone: UTC+1 (CET)
  - Summer (DST): UTC+2 (CEST)
- Website: Official website

Sanchidrián is a municipality located in the province of Ávila, Castile and León, Spain. It is the birthplace of the composer Tomás Luis de Victoria.

== Population ==
Historical population
Year	Pop.	±% p.a.
2023	710	—
2024	708	−0.28%
2025	720	+1.69%
Source: INE
