= Tenebrae Responsories (Victoria) =

- Motets by Tomás Luis de Victoria
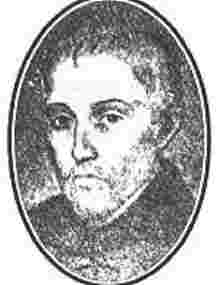
- The composer
- Text: Responsories for Holy Week
- Language: Latin
- Published: 1585: Rome
- Movements: 18
- Scoring: SATB choir

The Tenebrae Responsories by Tomás Luis de Victoria are a group of eighteen motets for four voices a cappella. The late Renaissance Spanish composer set them for Holy Week, specifically for the Triduum of Maundy Thursday, Good Friday and Holy Saturday. They use liturgical texts and were published in Rome in 1585.

The eighteen Tenebrae Responsories are set for four voices each but with a varying disposition of the voices soprano (S), alto (A), tenor (T) and bass (B). Soprano, tenor and bass are at times divided. Six responsories are dedicated to each Matins of Maundy Thursday ("coena Domini", the Lord's supper), Good Friday, and Holy Saturday ("Sabbato Sancto").

- Feria V in coena Domini ad Matutinum
  - 1. Amicus meus – SATB
  - 2. Judas, mercador pessimus – SSAT (also TTBB)
  - 3. Unus ex discipulis – SATB
  - 4. Eram quasi agnus – SATB
  - 5. Una hora – SSAT (also TTBB)
  - 6. Seniores populi – SATB
- Feria VI in parasceve ad Matutinum
  - 7. Tamquam ad latronem – SATB
  - 8. Tenebrae factae sunt – TTBB (also SSAT)
  - 9. Animam meam dilectam – SATB
  - 10. Tradiderunt me – SATB
  - 11. Jesum tradidit impius – SSAT
  - 12. Caligaverunt oculi mei – SATB
- Sabbato Sancto ad Matutinum
  - 13. Recessit pastor noster – SATB
  - 14. O vos omnes – SSAT (also SATB, TTBB)
  - 15. Ecce quomodo moritur justus – SATB
  - 16. Astiterunt reges – SATB
  - 17. Aestimatus sum – TTBB (and SSAT)
  - 18. Sepulto Domino – SATB

== Bibliography ==
- Cramer, E. C. (1973). The Officium Hebdomadae Sanctae of Tomás Luis de Victoria (Doctoral dissertation). Boston University.
- "1585 Officium Hebdomadae Sanctae de Victoria digitalization". Centro de Estudios Tomás Luis de Victoria. 1973.
