= Tenebrae responsories =

Responsories sung following the lessons of Tenebrae

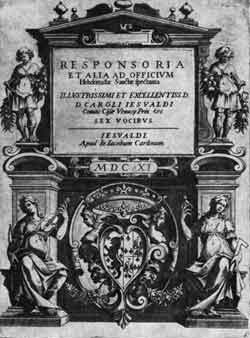
Title page of Carlo Gesualdo's Tenebrae Responsoria (1611)

Tenebrae responsories are the responsories sung following the lessons of Tenebrae, the Matins services of the last three days of Holy Week: Maundy Thursday, Good Friday and Holy Saturday.

In most places, Matins as well as Lauds of these days were normally anticipated on the evening of the preceding day and were celebrated on Wednesday, Maundy Thursday and Good Friday, respectively. The 1955 reform of the Holy Week ceremonies by Pope Pius XII, redefining Triduum Sacrum to include Easter Sunday and take in only the close of Maundy Thursday, moved them to Thursday, Friday and Saturday evenings. Tenebrae as such was not included in the 1970 Liturgy of the Hours, vanishing altogether around 1977. Summorum Pontificum (2007) now permits clerics bound to recitation of the Divine Office to use the 1961 Roman Breviary.

Polyphonic settings to replace plainchant have been published under a various titles, including Responsoria pro hebdomada sancta (Responsories for Holy Week). Composers who produced polyphonic settings include Tomás Luis de Victoria (Officium Hebdomadae Sanctae, 1585), Carlo Gesualdo (Responsoria et alia ad Officium Hebdomadae Sanctae spectantia, 1611), Jean L'Héritier, Marc-Antoine Charpentier, (19 settings: H.111 -119, H.126 - 134 and H.144), Jan Dismas Zelenka (ZWV 55), Max Reger and Francis Poulenc.

== The responsories ==
Within the liturgy, each responsory followed a reading. Each day's matins was divided into three nocturns. The first nocturn had three readings from Jeremiah's Book of Lamentations, and the second nocturn three readings from one or other of Saint Augustine's commentaries on the Psalms. The three readings of the third nocturn were from the First Epistle to the Corinthians on Maundy Thursday, from the Epistle to the Hebrews on the other two days.

Over the three days, therefore, the responsories, like the readings, came to a total of 27. Since the polyphonic Lamentations were an important musical genre in their own right, many collections (such as Victoria's Officium Hebdomadae sanctae 1585) include only the 18 Responsories of the second and third nocturns. Gesualdo, who set all 27, also includes a Miserere and Benedictus for Lauds, and a few composers (Fabrizio Dentice and Tiburtio Massaino) set these last three times each, one setting for each day.

== Maundy Thursday responsories ==
Maundy Thursday is called in Latin Feria V/Quinta in Cena Domini (an older spelling has Coena instead of Cena), meaning Thursday (fifth day of the week) of the Lord's Supper. Compositions for its nine responsories can therefore appear under such titles as Feria V – In Coena Domini. They can also be named by the day on which they were actually sung, as Charpentier's Les neuf répons du mercredi saint ("The nine responsories of Holy Wednesday").

=== Responsories of the first nocturn of Maundy Thursday ===
The three readings of the first nocturn of Maundy Thursday are Lamentations 1:1–5, 1:6–9 and 1:10–14.

==== In monte Oliveti ====
The first Maundy Thursday responsory refers to the Agony of Christ in Gethsemane at the foot of the Mount of Olives. Marc-Antoine Charpentier, Premier répons après la première leçon du premier nocturne, H.111, for 3 voices and continuo (1680).

- Free scores and text (Latin, translations) of "In monte Oliveti" in the Choral Public Domain Library (ChoralWiki)

==== Tristis est anima mea ====
The second responsory represents Jesus speaking to his disciples in the garden of Gethsemane. The first two lines of the responsory are Matthew 26:38. The last two lines of are more freely based on different Gospel passages, including Mark 14:50 and Luke 24:7.

Settings of this responsory include a motet by Orlande de Lassus, appearing as No. 1 in the Drexel 4302 manuscript, a SSATB motet attributed to Johann Kuhnau, Marc-Antoine Charpentier, 2 settings: Second répons après la seconde leçon du premier nocturne, H.112 (1680), for 2 voices and continuo and Second répons après la seconde leçon du premier nocturne du Mercredi Saint, H.126 (1690), for 2 voices and continuo and a setting as part of Francis Poulenc's Quatre motets pour un temps de pénitence.

- Free scores and text (Latin, translations) of "Tristis est anima mea" in the Choral Public Domain Library (ChoralWiki)

==== Ecce, vidimus eum ====
- Free scores and text (Latin, translations) of "Ecce vidimus eum" in the Choral Public Domain Library (ChoralWiki)

=== Responsories of the second nocturn of Maundy Thursday ===
The readings of the second nocturn of Maundy Thursday are from Saint Augustine's commentary on Psalm 54/55

==== Amicus meus ====
Troisième répons après la troisième leçon du premier nocturne, H.113 (1680), for 1 voice and continuo

Marc-Antoine Charpentier, Premier répons après la première leçon du second nocturne du Mercredi Saint, H.127 (1690), for 1 voice, 2 flutes and continuo

- Audio: "Amicus meus" by Tomás Luis de Victoria
- Free scores and text (Latin, translations) of "Amicus meus osculi" in the Choral Public Domain Library (ChoralWiki)

==== Judas mercator pessimus ====
Second of Poulenc's Sept répons des ténèbres.

- Free scores and text (Latin, translations) of "Judas mercator pessimus" in the Choral Public Domain Library (ChoralWiki)

==== Unus ex discipulis meis ====
Marc-Antoine Charpentier, Quatrième répons après la première leçon du second nocturne, H.114 (1680), for 2 voices and continuo

Marc-Antoine Charpentier, Troisième répons après la troisième leçon du second nocturne du Mercredi Saint, H.132 (1690), for 1 voice, 2 violins and continuo

- Audio: "Unus ex discipulis meis" by Tomás Luis de Victoria
- Free scores and text (Latin, translations) of "Unus ex discipulis" in the Choral Public Domain Library (ChoralWiki)

=== Responsories of the third nocturn of Maundy Thursday ===
The readings of the third nocturn of Maundy Thursday are 1 Corinthians 11:17−22, 11:23−26, 11:27−34

==== Eram quasi agnus innocens ====
Marc-Antoine Charpentier, Cinquième répons après la seconde leçon du second nocturne, H.115 (1680), for 1 voice and continuo

- Free scores and text (Latin, translations) of "Eram quasi agnus innocens" in the Choral Public Domain Library (ChoralWiki)

==== Una hora ====
Marc-Antoine Charpentier, Sixième répons après la troisième leçon du second nocturne, H.116 (1680), for 3 voices and continuo

First of Poulenc's Sept répons des ténèbres.

- Free scores and text (Latin, translations) of "Una hora" in the Choral Public Domain Library (ChoralWiki)

==== Seniores populi ====
Marc-Antoine Charpentier, Septième répons après la première leçon du troisième nocturne, H.117 (1680), for 1 voice and continuo

- Free scores and text (Latin, translations) of "Seniores populi" in the Choral Public Domain Library (ChoralWiki)

== Responsories of Good Friday ==
Good Friday, Feria VI/Sexta in Parasceve, meaning Friday (sixth day of the week) of the Day of Preparation (from Greek Παρασκευή). Thus this second set of nine responsories can appear under such titles as Feria VI – In Parasceve.

=== Responsories of the first nocturn of Good Friday ===
The readings of the first nocturn of Good Friday are Lamentations 2:8–11, 2:12–15 and 3:1–9.

==== Omnes amici mei ====
Marc-Antoine Charpentier, Répons après la première leçon de ténèbres du Jeudi Saint, H.144 (mid1690), for 1 voice, 2 flutes and continuo

- Free scores and text (Latin, translations) of "Omnes amici mei" in the Choral Public Domain Library (ChoralWiki)

==== Velum templi scissum est ====
Marc-Antoine Charpentier, Second répons après la seconde leçon du premier nocturne du Jeudi Saint, H.128, for soloists, chorus, flutes, strings and continuo (1690)

- Free scores and text (Latin, translations) of "Velum templi" in the Choral Public Domain Library (ChoralWiki)

==== Vinea mea electa ====
Second of Poulenc's Quatre motets pour un temps de pénitence.

- Free scores and text (Latin, translations) of "Vinea mea electa" in the Choral Public Domain Library (ChoralWiki)

=== Responsories of the second nocturn of Good Friday ===
The readings of the second nocturn of Good Friday are from Saint Augustine's commentary on Psalm 63/64

==== Tamquam ad latronem existis ====
Marc-Antoine Charpentier, Premier répons après la première leçon du second nocturne du Jeudi Saint, H.133 (1690), for 1 voice, 2 flutes, 2 violins and continuo

- Free scores and text (Latin, translations) of "Tamquam ad latronem" in the Choral Public Domain Library (ChoralWiki)

==== Tenebrae factae sunt ====
This responsory is included on p. 269 of the Lutheran Neu Leipziger Gesangbuch (1682). Marc-Antoine Charpentier, Second répons après la seconde leçon du second nocturne du Jeudi Saint, for 1 voice, flutes, strings and continuo, H.129 (1690).Third of Poulenc's Quatre motets pour un temps de pénitence, and fifth of his Sept répons des ténèbres

- Free scores and text (Latin, translations) of "Tenebrae factae sunt" in the Choral Public Domain Library (ChoralWiki)

==== Animam meam dilectam ====
- Free scores and text (Latin, translations) of "Animam meam dilectam" in the Choral Public Domain Library (ChoralWiki)

=== Responsories of the third nocturn of Good Friday ===
The readings of the third nocturn of Holy Saturday are taken from Hebrews 4:11 – 5:10.

==== Tradiderunt me ====
- Free scores and text (Latin, translations) of "Tradiderunt me" in the Choral Public Domain Library (ChoralWiki)

==== Jesum tradidit impius ====
Third of Poulenc's Sept répons des ténèbres

- Free scores and text (Latin, translations) of "Jesum tradidit impius" in the Choral Public Domain Library (ChoralWiki)

==== Caligaverunt oculi mei ====
Fourth of Poulenc's Sept répons des ténèbres

- Audio: "Caligaverunt oculi mei" by Tomás Luis de Victoria
- Free scores and text (Latin, translations) of "Caligaverunt oculi mei" in the Choral Public Domain Library (ChoralWiki)

== Responsories of Holy Saturday ==
Holy Saturday, Sabbato Sancto in Latin. Responsories for this day can appear under such titles as Sabbato Sancto.

=== Responsories of the first nocturn of Holy Saturday ===
The readings of the first nocturn of Holy Saturday are from Lamentations, 3:22–30, 4:1–6 and 5:1–11.

==== Sicut ovis ====
Responsorium:
Sicut ovis ad occisionem ductus est,
Et dum male tractaretur, non aperuit os suum :
Traditus est ad mortem ut vivificaret populum suum.
Versus:
Tradidit in mortem animam suam,
Et inter sceleratos reputatus est.

- Free scores and text (Latin, translations) of "Sicut ovis ad occisionem" in the Choral Public Domain Library (ChoralWiki)

==== Jerusalem surge ====
Marc-Antoine Charpentier, Second répons après la seconde leçon du premier nocturne de Vendredi Saint, H.130 (1690), for 2 voices, 2 flutes and continuo

- Free scores and text (Latin, translations) of "Jerusalem surge et exue" in the Choral Public Domain Library (ChoralWiki)

==== Plange quasi virgo ====
This responsory has some parallels with the Book of Joel, e.g. "plange quasi virgo" ("Lament like a girl", 1:8), "accingite vos et plangite sacerdotes ululate ministri altaris" ("Put on sackcloth and mourn, you priests; Wail, you ministers of the altar", 1:13) and "magnus enim dies Domini et terribilis valde" ("for the day of Yahweh is great and very awesome", 2:11).

Responsorium:
Plange quasi virgo, plebs mea.
Ululate pastores, in cinere et cilicio,
Quia veniet Dies Domini Magna
Et amara valde.
Versus:
Accingite vos, sacerdotes, et plangite,
Ministri altaris, aspergite vos cinere.

- Free scores and text (Latin, translations) of "Plange quasi virgo" in the Choral Public Domain Library (ChoralWiki)

=== Responsories of the second nocturn of Holy Saturday ===
The readings of the second nocturn of Holy Saturday are from Saint Augustine's commentary on Psalm 63/64.

==== Recessit pastor noster ====
- Free scores and text (Latin, translations) of "Recessit Pastor noster" in the Choral Public Domain Library (ChoralWiki)

==== O vos omnes ====
The text is adapted from the Latin Vulgate translation of Lamentations 1:12. Some of the most famous settings of the text are by Tomás Luis de Victoria (two settings for four voices: 1572 and 1585), Carlo Gesualdo (five voices: 1603; six voices: 1611), Marc-Antoine Charpentier, Second répons après la 1ère leçon du second nocturne du Vendredi saint, H.134, for 1 voice, flutes and continuo (1690) and Pablo Casals (mixed choir: 1932).

- Audio: "O vos omnes" by Tomás Luis de Victoria (1585) performed by The Tudor Consort
- Free scores and text (Latin, translations) of "O vos omnes" in the Choral Public Domain Library (ChoralWiki)

==== Ecce quomodo moritur justus ====
Based on Isaiah 57:1–2. A German version of the text of this responsory is set as Der Gerechte kömmt um. Poulenc set it as the seventh of his Sept répons des ténèbres.

Marc-Antoine Charpentier, Troisième répons après la troisième leçon du second nocturne du Vendredi Saint, H.131 (1690), for 1 voice, muted strings and continuo

- Free scores and text (Latin, translations) of "Ecce quomodo moritur" in the Choral Public Domain Library (ChoralWiki)

=== Responsories of the third nocturn of Holy Saturday ===
The three readings of the third nocturn of Holy Saturday are Hebrews 9:11–14, 9:15–18 and 9:19–22.

==== Astiterunt reges terrae ====
- Free scores and text (Latin, translations) of "Astiterunt reges terrae" in the Choral Public Domain Library (ChoralWiki)

==== Aestimatus sum ====
- Free scores and text (Latin, translations) of "Aestimatus sum" in the Choral Public Domain Library (ChoralWiki)

==== Sepulto Domino ====
Sixth of Poulenc's Sept répons des ténèbres

- Free scores and text (Latin, translations) of "Sepulto Domino" in the Choral Public Domain Library (ChoralWiki)
