= The Tudor Consort =

Choral group in Wellington, Newzealand

- Choir
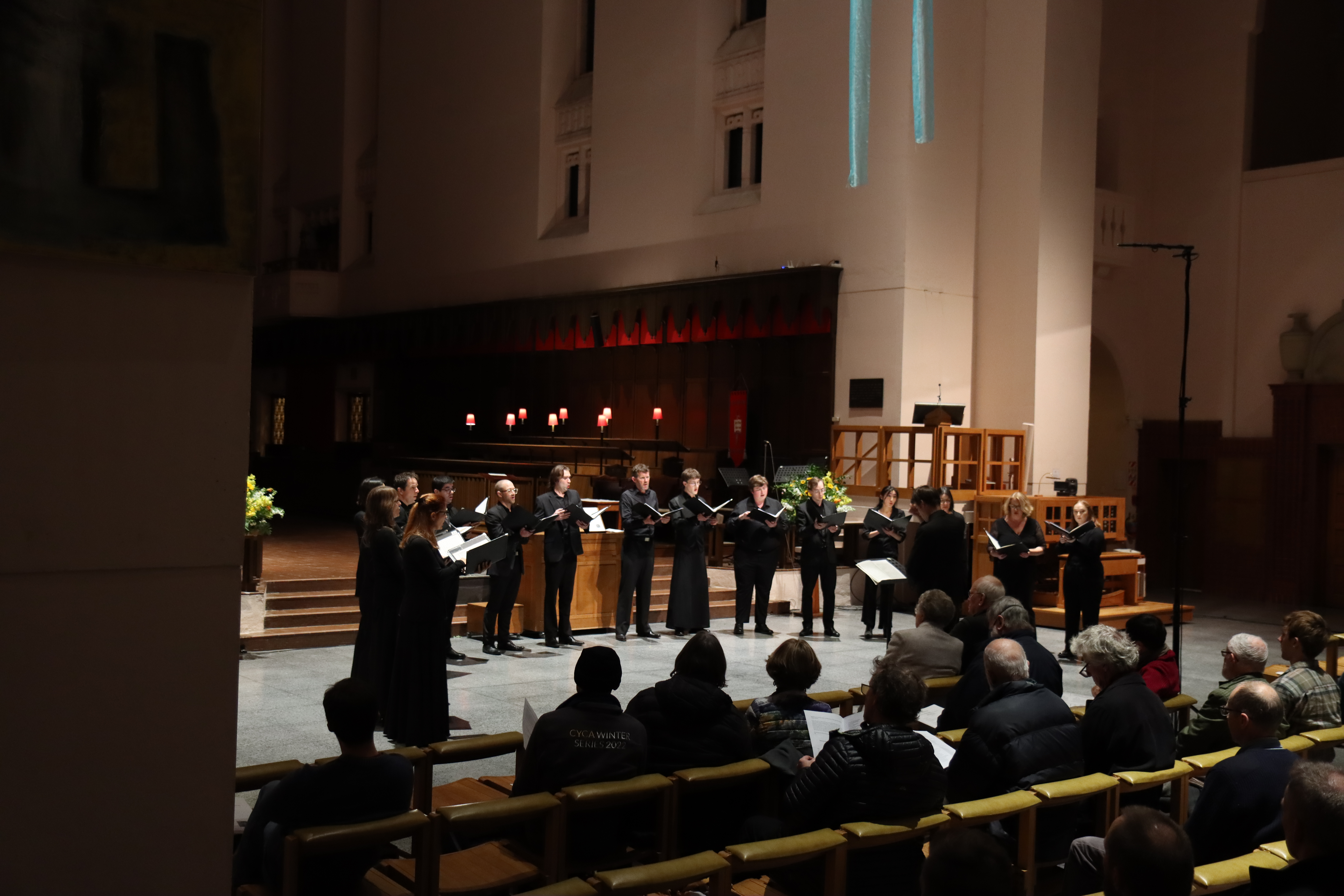
- Tudor Consort performing in Wellington Cathedral of St Paul, 2023
- Founded: 1986; 39 years ago
- Genre: Early music
- Music director: Michael Stewart
- Headquarters: Wellington, New Zealand
- Concert hall: Wellington Cathedral of St Paul
- Website: tudor-consort.org.nz

The Tudor Consort is a specialist early choral group based in Wellington, New Zealand. Depending on the repertoire the group can range in size from 5 to 25 members. The group was formed in 1986 by Simon Ravens with the intention of performing lesser-known choral music from the late Medieval and Renaissance periods, laying special emphasis on English sixteenth century music. The repertoire performed by the Consort made it, in the words of the local media of the time, occupy "a unique position in [New Zealand's] musical life" and that it was "one of New Zealand's musical wonders".

Authentic performance practice is a major aim of The Tudor Consort, and consideration of ensemble size, pronunciation, pitch, vocal style and ornamentation feature strongly in the work of the group. Under Simon Ravens the group often performed original editions, reflecting Simon's own study in Britain under David Wulstan. Simon, with The Tudor Consort, pioneered the use of liturgical reconstruction as a method of presenting early sacred music. Media and critical reaction was immediate and overwhelmingly positive.

Succeeding directors substantially expanded on the group's repertoire base to the excitement of the local musical community. Internationally recognised baroque specialist Professor Peter Walls directed performances of early 17th-century Venetian vespers and masses, music for the Coronation of James II and VII and Mary, Mozart orchestral masses, Bach and Buxtehude cantatas, Purcell and Handel anthems, many performed in conjunction with period instrument ensemble The Baroque Players. The group also staged performances of Purcell's Dido and Aeneas and Blow's Venus and Adonis. These performances received high critical praise. Peter also directed the choir in its first commercial recording of Peter Philips motets for the Naxos Records label. Peter's successor Ivan Patterson introduced a repertoire from the 19th and 20th centuries; under Ivan's direction the group also explored the medieval period in more detail, particularly focusing on works by women composers of the period.

Cantor Alastair Carey was appointed as director in 2001. Alastair's expertise lies in vocal production, choral blend and the repertoire of the Renaissance, particularly the sacred choral music of the English school and the Recusants. Under Alastair's guidance the group toured overseas and claimed silver and bronze awards at the 35th International Choral Competition in Tolosa, Spain in 2003.

The Tudor Consort's current director is Michael Stewart.

== Recordings ==
William Byrd: Out of the Deep
Recorded live in Borja, Spain in October 2005 (3.2Mb)

Thomas Tallis: Lamentatione Jeremiae Prophetae
Recorded live in Madonna dei Monti, Rome, in November 2005 (5Mb)

Tomas Luis de Victoria: O vos omnes
Recorded live in 2003 (1.8Mb)

Additional recordings are available on The Tudor Consort's website.

=== Films ===
Selected film and/or other media soundtracks featuring The Tudor Consort:

- 2025 A Minecraft Movie (Mothersbaugh, Mark)
- 2024 The Lord of the Rings: The War of the Rohirrim (Gallagher, Stephen)
- 2015 Krampus (Pipes, Douglas)
