= Tomás Luis de Victoria =

Spanish composer (c. 1548 – 1611)

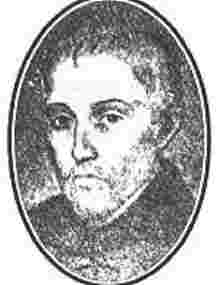
An imaginary portrait by an unknown 19th-century artist

Tomás Luis de Victoria (sometimes Italianised as da Vittoria; c. 1548 – c. 20–27 August 1611) was the most famous Spanish composer of the Renaissance. He stands with Giovanni Pierluigi da Palestrina and Orlande de Lassus as among the principal composers of the late Renaissance, and was "admired above all for the intensity of some of his motets and of his Offices for the Dead and for Holy Week". His surviving oeuvre, unlike that of his colleagues, is almost exclusively sacred and polyphonic vocal music, set to Latin texts. As a Catholic priest, as well as an accomplished organist and singer, his career spanned both Spain and Italy. However, he preferred the life of a composer to that of a performer.

== Life and career ==
=== Family background and early years ===
Tomás Luis de Victoria was born around 1548, most likely in Ávila, the main residence of his family at the time. Victoria’s birthplace has been the subject of debate, and remains unclear since his baptismal record has never been found. The town of Sanchidrián has been proposed as another possible birthplace, however it was only later that the Victorias would settle there, when Tomás’ eldest brother moved to Sanchidrián with his young family and widowed mother. In Tomás’ youth Sanchidrián was only the site of one of the family’s many rural landholdings.

The origins of the Luis de Victoria family on the paternal side can be traced only as far back as Tomás’ grandfather, Hernán Luis Dávila, who makes his first documented appearance in Avila during the opening years of the sixteenth century. The name Victoria comes from Hernán’s wife, Leonor de Vitoria. Following Spanish practice of the time, their children combined their surnames, in the order of their preference, or chose between them. The original spelling Vitoria (from the city of the same name) was to be used by all members of this family with the exception of Tomás himself, who adopted the Latinized “Victoria.”

Hernán Luis Dávila was a prosperous cloth merchant who shrewdly invested his profits into building an expansive real estate portfolio throughout Ávila province. Both his profession and property speculation, as well as the family’s increasing involvement in banking, are strongly suggestive of converso origins, though there is no hard evidence to support this. The Victorias lived on Calle de los Caballeros, which was then lined with wool and silk shops, across from San Juan Bautista, their parish church, and just steps away from the main market square of the city. Their house still stands, and the tombs of Tomás’ parents and grandparents are at San Juan.

Victoria was the seventh of nine children born to Francisco Luis de Vitoria and Francisca Suárez de la Concha. His mother's family were affluent wool merchants and bankers of Jewish origin, based in Segovia. Francisca's great-grandfather, Jacob Galfón, briefly took his family to Portugal following the expulsion of the Jews, but returned to Segovia with royal authorization late in 1492, converting to Christianity and taking the name Pedro Suárez de la Concha. The Suárez de la Concha family were elevated to the aristocracy, eventually acquiring the title Marqués de Lozoya.

Francisco, Tomás’ father, had a lucrative business as a notary in Ávila, and also derived substantial income from rents on the family landholdings and from moneylending; however, he was prone to gambling, which resulted in a decline in the family fortune. As a result of this, upon Francisco’s death his eldest son Hernán sold the family home in Ávila and moved to their estate in Sanchidrián. This was only a temporary setback, and the Victorias would soon regain their footing, becoming more involved in banking, in association with their Suárez de la Concha cousins and others based in Castile’s financial capital of the time, Medina del Campo. Significantly, during this time of financial insecurity Hernán would break with conventional practice and share his inheritance, ensuring that his siblings received educations and dowries. In Tomás’ case this made possible, along with the support of their uncle the priest Juan Luis de Vitoria, his early music training at Ávila’s cathedral school.

=== Education and career ===
After his father's death in 1557, his uncle, Juan Luis, became Tomás' guardian. He was a choirboy in Ávila Cathedral. Cathedral records state that his uncle, Juan Luis, presented Victoria's Liber Primus to the Church while reminding them that Victoria had been brought up in the Ávila Cathedral. Because he was such an accomplished organist, many believe that he began studying the keyboard at an early age from a teacher in Ávila. Victoria most likely began studying "the classics" at St. Giles's, a boys' school in Ávila. This school was praised by St. Teresa of Avila and some highly regarded people of music.

After receiving a grant from Philip II in 1565, Victoria went to Rome and became cantor at the German College founded by St. Ignatius Loyola. He may have studied with Palestrina around this time, though the evidence is circumstantial; certainly he was influenced by the Italian's style. For some time, beginning in 1573, Victoria held two positions, one being at the German College and the other being at the Pontifical Roman Seminary. He held the positions of chapelmaster and instructor of plainsong. In 1571, he was hired at the German College as a teacher and began earning his first steady income. After Palestrina left the Seminary, Victoria took over the position of maestro. Victoria was ordained a priest in 1574 by bishop Thomas Goldwell. Before this he was made a deacon, but did not serve long in that capacity as typically deacons became priests soon after. In 1575, Victoria was appointed Maestro di Capella at S. Apollinare. Church officials would often ask Victoria for his opinion on appointments to cathedral positions because of his fame and knowledge. He was faithful to his position as convent organist even after his professional debut as an organist. He did not stay in Italy, however.

In 1587 Philip II honoured Victoria's desire to return to his native Spain, naming him chaplain to his sister, the Dowager Empress María, daughter of Charles V, who had been living in retirement with her daughter Princess Margarita at the Monasterio de las Descalzas de St. Clara at Madrid from 1581. In 1591, Victoria became a godfather to his brother Juan Luis's daughter, Isabel de Victoria. Victoria worked for 24 years at Descalzas Reales, serving for 17 years as chaplain to the Empress until her death, and then as convent organist. Victoria was also being paid much more at the Descalzas Reales than he would have earned as a cathedral chapelmaster, receiving an annual income from absentee benefices from 1587 to 1611. When the Empress Maria died in 1603, she willed three chaplaincies in the convent, with one going to Victoria. According to Victoria, he never accepted any extra pay for being a chapelmaster, and became the organist rather than the chapelmaster. Such was the esteem in which he was held that his contract allowed him frequent travel away from the convent. He was able to visit Rome in 1593 for two years, attending Palestrina's funeral in 1594. He died in 1611 in the chaplain's residence and was buried at the convent, although his tomb has yet to be identified.

== Music ==
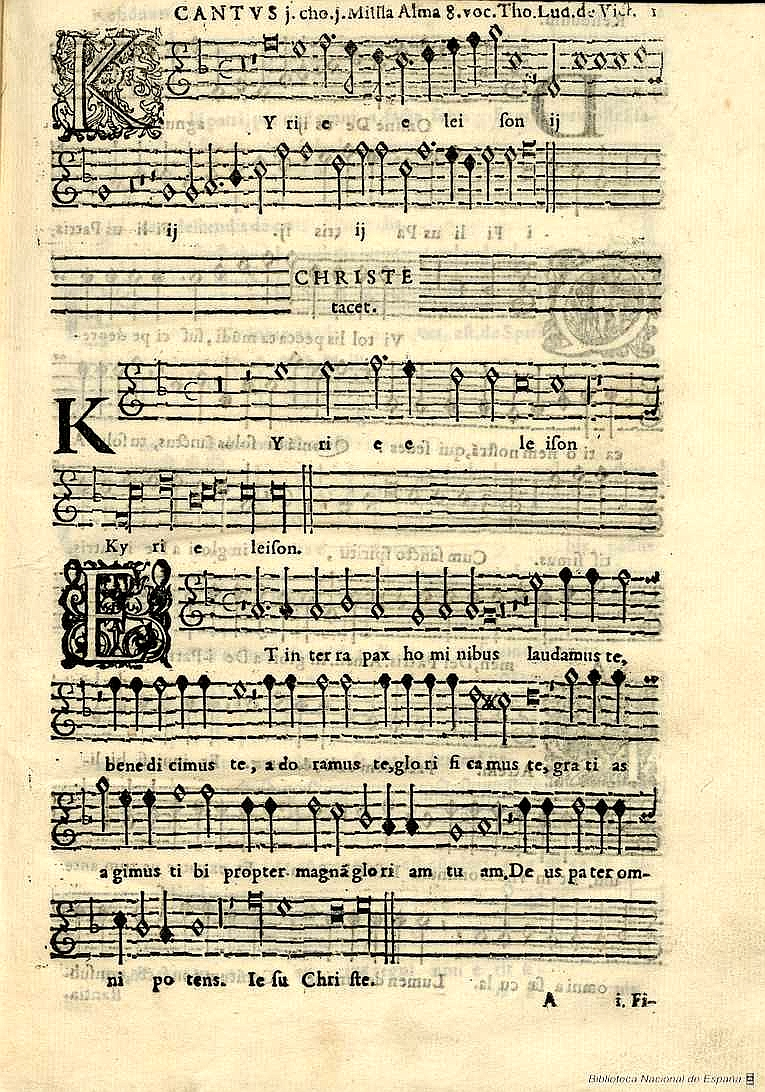
A copy of a part for Victoria's mass, Alma Redemptoris mater

Victoria is the most significant composer of the Counter-Reformation in Spain, and one of the best-regarded composers of sacred music in the late Renaissance, a genre to which he devoted himself exclusively. Victoria's music reflected his personality, expressing the passion of Spanish mysticism and religion. Victoria was praised by Padre Martini for his melodic phrases and his joyful inventions. His works have undergone a revival in the 20th century, with numerous recent recordings. Many commentators hear in his music a mystical intensity and direct emotional appeal, qualities considered by some to be lacking in the arguably more rhythmically and harmonically placid music of Palestrina. There are quite a few differences in their compositional styles, such as treatment of melody and quarter-note dissonances.

Victoria was a master at overlapping and dividing choirs with multiple parts with a gradual decreasing of rhythmic distance throughout. Not only does Victoria incorporate intricate parts for the voices, but the organ is almost treated like a soloist in many of his choral pieces. Victoria did not originate the development of psalm settings or antiphons for two choirs, but he continued and increased the popularity of such repertoire. Victoria republished works that had appeared previously, and incorporated revisions into each reissue.

Victoria published his first book of motets in 1572. In 1585 he wrote his Officium Hebdomadae Sanctae, a collection which included 37 pieces that are part of the Holy Week celebrations in the Catholic liturgy, including the eighteen motets of the Tenebrae Responsories.

Two influences in Victoria's life were Giovanni Maria Nanino and Luca Marenzio, whom Victoria admired for their work in madrigals rather than church music. It has been speculated that Victoria took lessons from Escobedo at an early age before moving to Rome.

Victoria claimed that he composed his most creative works under his patron Otto, Cardinal von Truchsess. However, Stevenson does not believe that he learned everything about music under Cardinal Truchsess's patronage. During the years that Victoria was devoted to Philip II of Spain, he expressed exhaustion from his compositional work. Most of the compositions that Victoria wrote that were dedicated to Cardinal Michele Bonelli, Philip II of Spain, or Pope Gregory XIII were not compensated properly.

Stylistically, his music shuns the elaborate counterpoint of many of his contemporaries, preferring simple line and homophonic textures, yet seeking rhythmic variety and sometimes including intense and surprising contrasts. His melodic writing and use of dissonance is more free than that of Palestrina; occasionally he uses intervals which are prohibited in the strict application of 16th century counterpoint, such as ascending major sixths, or even occasional diminished fourths (for example, a melodic diminished fourth occurs in a passage representing grief in his motet Sancta Maria, succurre). Victoria sometimes uses dramatic word-painting, of a kind usually found only in madrigals. Some of his sacred music uses instruments (a practice which is not uncommon in Spanish sacred music of the 16th century), and he also wrote polychoral works for more than one spatially separated group of singers, in the style of the composers of the Venetian school who were working at St. Mark's in Venice.

His most famous work, and his masterpiece, Officium Defunctorum, is a Requiem Mass for the Empress Maria.

== Works ==
The number of voices are included in parentheses

=== Masses ===
- Alma redemptoris mater (8)
- Ascendens Christus (5)
- Ave maris stella (4)
- Ave regina coelorum (8)
- De Beata Maria Virgine (5)
- Dum complerentur (6)
- Gaudeamus (6)
- Laetatus sum (12)
- O magnum mysterium (4)
- O quam gloriosum (4)
- Pro defunctis (4)
- Pro defunctis (6)
- Pro Victoria (9)
- Quam pulchri sunt (4)
- Quarti toni (4)
- Salve regina (8)
- Simile est regnum coelorum (4)
- Surge propera (5)
- Trahe me post te (5)
- Vidi speciosam (6)

Spurious

- Dominicalis (4)
- Pange lingua (4)

Magnificat (each sets just the odd verses polyphonically, or just the even verses, a few set all)

Odd / Even

- primi toni (4)
- secondi toni (4)
- tertii toni (4)
- quarti toni (4)
- quinti toni (4)
- sexti toni (4)
- septimi toni (4)
- octavi toni (4)

Both

- primi toni (8)
- sexti toni (12)

=== Lamentations ===
- Cogitavit Dominus (4)
- Ego vir videns (5)
- Et egressus est (4)
- Incipit lamentation Jeremiae (4)
- Incipit oratio Jeremiae (6)
- Manum suam (5)
- Matribus suis dixerunt (4)
- Misericordiae Domini (4)
- Quomodo obscuratum (4)

=== Motets ===
Four voices

- Beati immaculati
- Benedicam Dominum
- Date ei de fructu
- Doctor bonus amicus Dei Andreas
- Domine non sum dignus
- Duo seraphim clamabant
- Ecce sacerdos magnus
- Ego sum panis vivus
- Estote fortes in bello
- Gaudent in coelis animae Sanctorum
- Hic vir despiciens mundum
- Iste sanctus pro lege
- Magi viderunt stellam
- Ne timeas, Maria
- O decus apostolicum
- O doctor optime
- O magnum mysterium
- O quam gloriosum est regnum
- O quam metuendus
- O regnum coeli
- O sacrum convivium
- O vos omnes
- Pueri Hebraeorum
- Quam pulchri sunt gressus tui
- Sancta Maria, succurre miseris
- Senex puerum portabat
- Veni, sponsa Christi
- Vere languores nostros

Five voices

- Ascendens Christus in altum
- Cum beatus Ignatius
- Descendit angelus Domini
- Dum complerentur dies Pentecostes
- Ecce Dominus veniet
- Gaude, Maria virgo
- O lux et decus Hispaniae
- Resplenduit facies ejus

Six Voices

- Ardens est cor meum
- Beata es Virgo Maria
- Benedicta sit Sancta Trinitas
- Congratulamini mihi
- Nigra sum
- O Domine Jesu Christe
- O sacrum convivium
- Quem vidistis, pastores
- Surrexit Pastor Bonus
- Trahe me post te
- Tu es Petrus
- Vadam, et circuibo civitatem
- Vidi speciosam
- Versa est in luctum

Eight voices

- Ave Maria
- Domine in virtute tua
- O Ildephonse
- Vidi speciosam

=== Canticles ===
- Benedictus Dominus
- Nunc dimittis (4)
- Nunc dimittis (5)

=== Hymns ===
(All 4 voices except Tantum ergo, 5)

- Ad caenam agni provide
- Ad preces nostras
- Aurea luce et decore
- Ave maris stella (even verses)
- Ave maris stella (odd verses)
- Christe redemptor omnium I
- Christe redemptor omnium II
- Conditor alme siderum
- Decus egregie Paule
- Deus tuorum militum
- Exultet caelum laudibus
- Hostis Herodes impie
- Huius obtentu Deus
- Iste confessor
- Jesu corona virginum
- Jesu nostra redemptio
- Lauda mater Ecclisia
- Lucis creator optime
- O lux beata Trinitas
- Pange lingua I
- Pange lingua II
- Quicumque Christum queritis
- Quodcumque vinclis (also Petrus beatus catenarum)
- Rex gloriose martyrum
- Salvete flores martyrum
- Sanctorum meritis
- Tantum ergo sacramentum(5)
- Te Deum laudamus
- Te lucis ante terminum
- Tibi Christe splendor patris
- Tristes errant apostoli
- Urbs beata Jerusalem
- Veni creator spiritus
- Vexilla Regis prodeunt I
- Vexilla Regis prodeunt II

=== Magnificats ===
(odd or even verses, 4 voices)

- Primi toni (4)
- Secondi toni (4)
- Terti toni (4)
- Quarti toni (4)
- Quinti toni (4)
- Sexti toni (4)
- Septime toni (4)
- Octavi toni (4)

Both

- Primi toni (8 voices)
- Sexti toni (12 voices)

=== Lamentations ===
Maundy Thursday

- Incipit lamentation Jeremiae (4)
- Et egressus est (4)
- Manum suam (5)

Good Friday

- Cogitavit Dominus (4)
- Matribus suis dixerunt (4)
- Ego vir videns (5)

Holy Saturday

- Misericordiae Domini (4)
- Quomodo obscuratum (4)
- Incipit oratio Jeremiae (6)

Lesson

- Taedet animam meam

Litany

- de beata Virgine

=== Passions ===
- St. Matthew
- St. John

=== Psalms ===
(Number, voices, [Mode, verses])

- Nisi Dominus (126, 8)
- Super flumina Babylonis (136, 8)
- Dixit Dominus (109, 8)
- Laudate pueri Dominum (112, 8)
- Laudate Dominum omnes gentes (116, 8)
- Laudate sum (121, 12)
- Ecce nunc benedicite (135, 8)
- Dixit Dominus (109, 4, I, odd)
- Confitebor tibi Domine (110, 4, 4, odd)
- Beatus vir (111, 4, 8, even)
- Laudate pueri Dominum (112, 4, 6, even)
- Lauda Jerusalem (147, 4, 7, odd)
- Confitebor tibi Domine (110, 4, 4, even)
- Beatus vir (111, 4, 8, odd)
- Nisi Dominus (126, 4, 8, odd)
- Credidi (115, 4, 6, odd)

=== Tenebrae Responsories ===
Thursday Matins

- Amicus meus
- Judas mercator pessimus
- Unus ex discipulis meis

Thursday Lauds

- Eram quasi agnus
- Una hora
- Seniores populi

Friday Matins

- Tamquam ad latronem
- Tenebrae factae sunt
- Animam meam dilectam

Friday Lauds

- Tradiderunt me
- Jesum tradidit impius
- Caligaverunt oculi mei

Saturday Matins

- Recessit pastor noster
- O vos omnes
- Ecce quomodo moritur Justus

Saturday Lauds

- Astiterunt reges terrae
- Aestimatus sum
- Sepulto Domino

=== Sequences ===
- Lauda Sion salvatorem (8)
- Victimae Paschali (8)
- Veni Sancte Spiritus (8)

== Selected recordings ==
Unus ex discipulis meis

Caligaverunt oculi mei

Amicus meus

O vos omnes
Recorded live in 2003 by The Tudor Consort (1.8Mb)

The following are recordings of music by Tomás Luis de Victoria. As in all of his music, the texts are in Latin and drawn from the Roman Catholic Liturgy.

- Victoria, Tenebrae Responsories. Pro Cantione Antiqua: Deutsche Harmonia Mundi CD GD77056
- Victoria, Et Jesum. Motets, antífonas y partes de miss. Carlos Mena, Juan Carlos Rivera: CD Harmonia Mundi Iberica 987042
- Victoria, Officium Defunctorum. Musica Ficta, Raúl Mallavibarrena: Enchiriadis CD EN 2006
- Victoria, Sacred Works. Ensemble Plus Ultra: DGG Archiv CD DDD 0289 477 9747 0 AM 10
- Victoria, Tenebrae Responsories. The Tallis Scholars: Gimell Records. CDGIM 022
- Victoria, Lamentations of Jeremiah. The Tallis Scholars: Gimell Records. CDGIM 043
- Victoria, Gesualdo, Palestrina, White, Lamentations. Nordic Voices: CHANDOS CHACONNE. CHAN 0763
- Victoria, Misas y Motetes. Ars Combinatoria, Canco López: Musaris. Mars 03-21161/16.

Select recordings of music by Victoria are discussed in an article published in March 2011 by Gramophone
