= Tenebrae Responsoria (Gesualdo) =

Settings by Italian composer Carlo Gesualdo

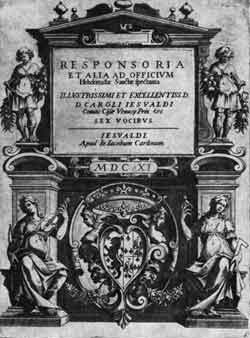
Title page of Gesualdo's Tenebrae Responsoria

Responsoria et alia ad Officium Hebdomadae Sanctae spectantia is a collection of music for Holy Week by Italian composer Carlo Gesualdo, published in 1611. It consists of three sets of nine short pieces, one set for each of Maundy Thursday, Good Friday and Holy Saturday, and a psalm and a hymn. The work was written for unaccompanied voices: two soprano parts, alto, two tenor parts, and bass.

The texts of the Responsories for Holy Week are related to Jesus's Passion and are sung in between the lessons at Tenebrae. Gesualdo's settings are stylistically madrigali spirituali - madrigals on sacred texts. As in Gesualdo's later books of madrigals, he uses particularly sharp dissonance and shocking chromatic juxtapositions, especially in the parts highlighting text passages having to do with Christ's suffering, or the guilt of St. Peter in having betrayed Jesus.

== Content ==
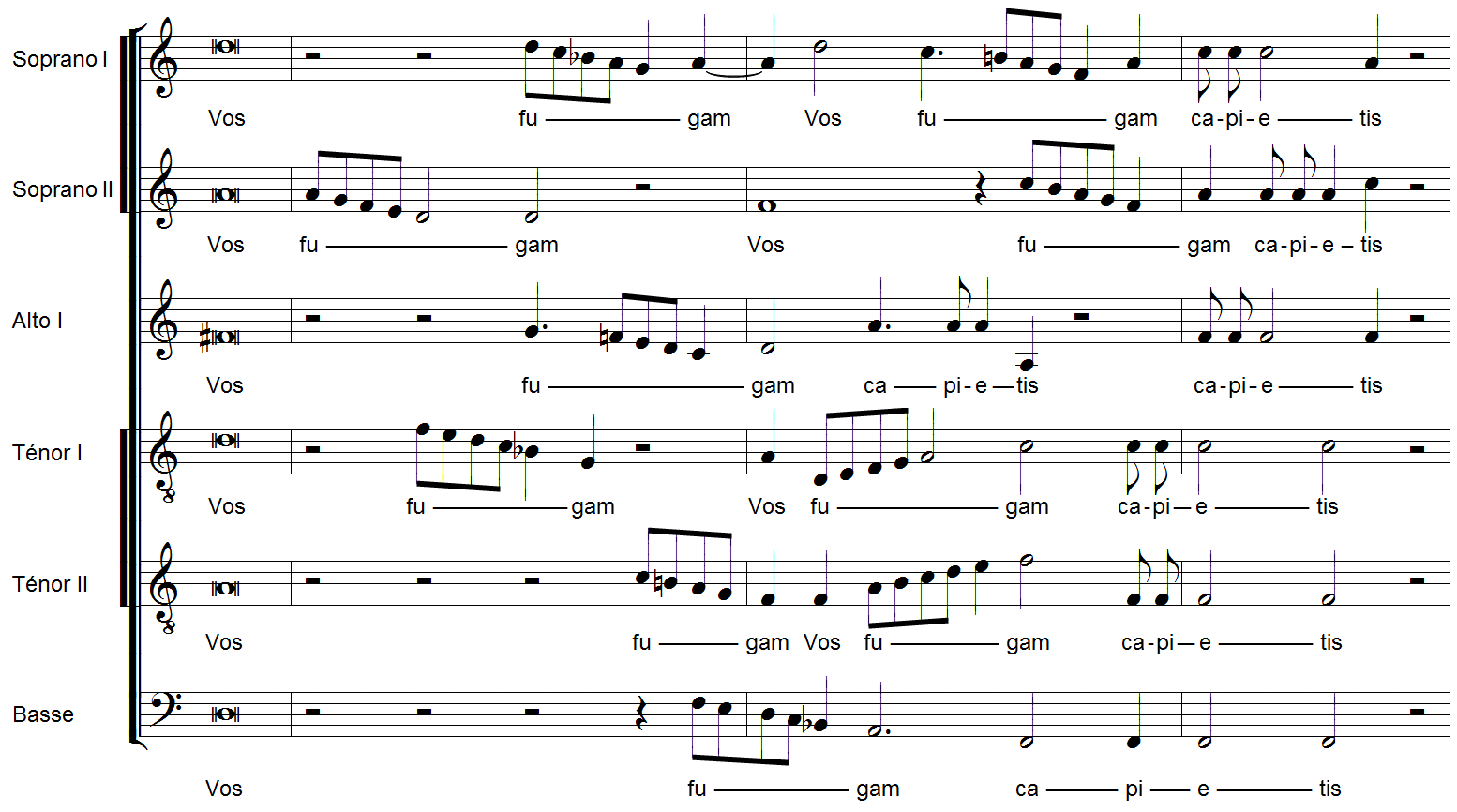
"Vos fugam..." part from I,2 Tristis est anima mea

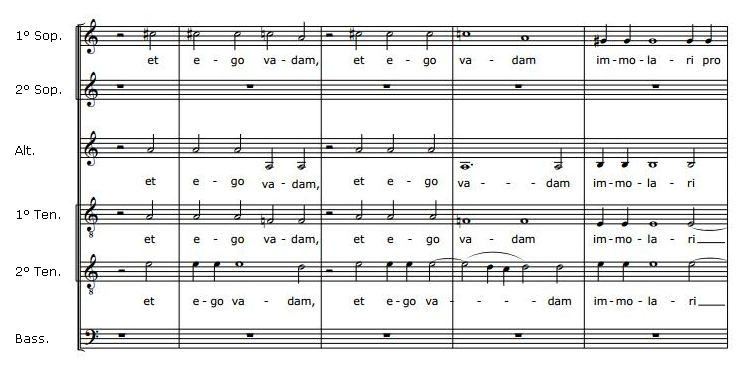
"et ego vadam..." part from I,2 Tristis est anima mea

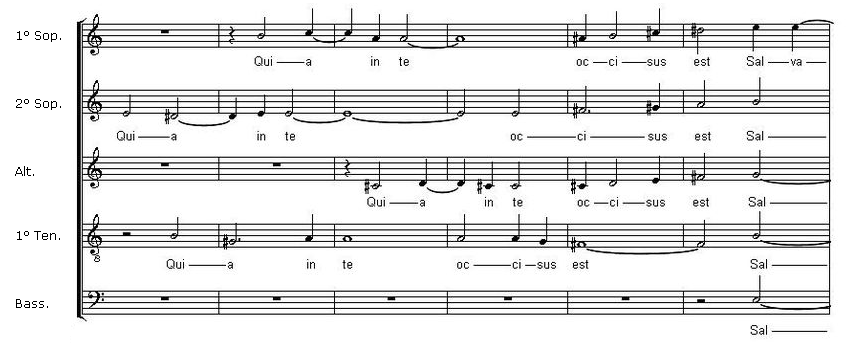
"Quia in te occisus est Salvator..." part from III, 2 Jerusalem surge

Mode shifts in "Quia in te occisus est Salvator..." (see previous example)

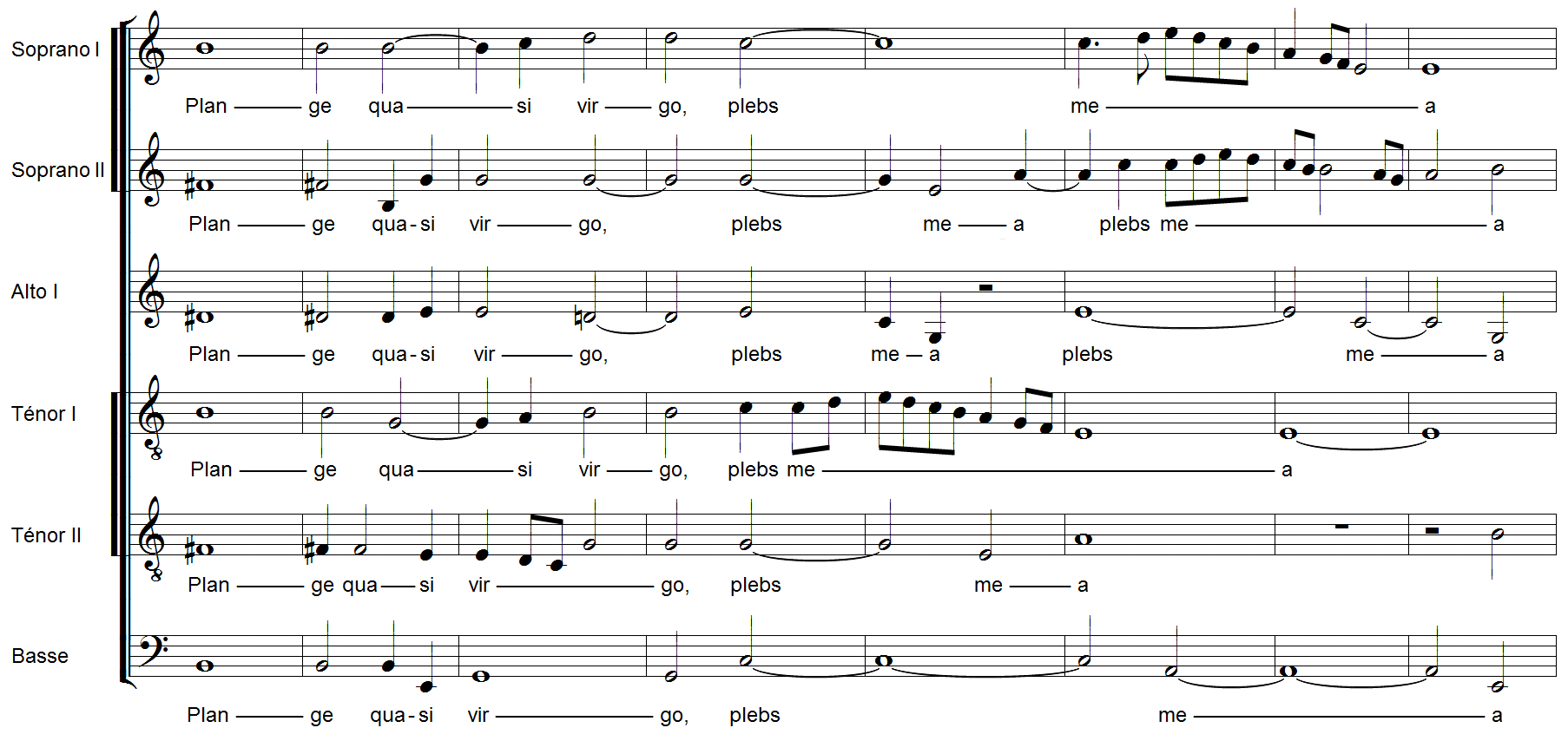
Beginning of III, 3 Plange quasi virgo

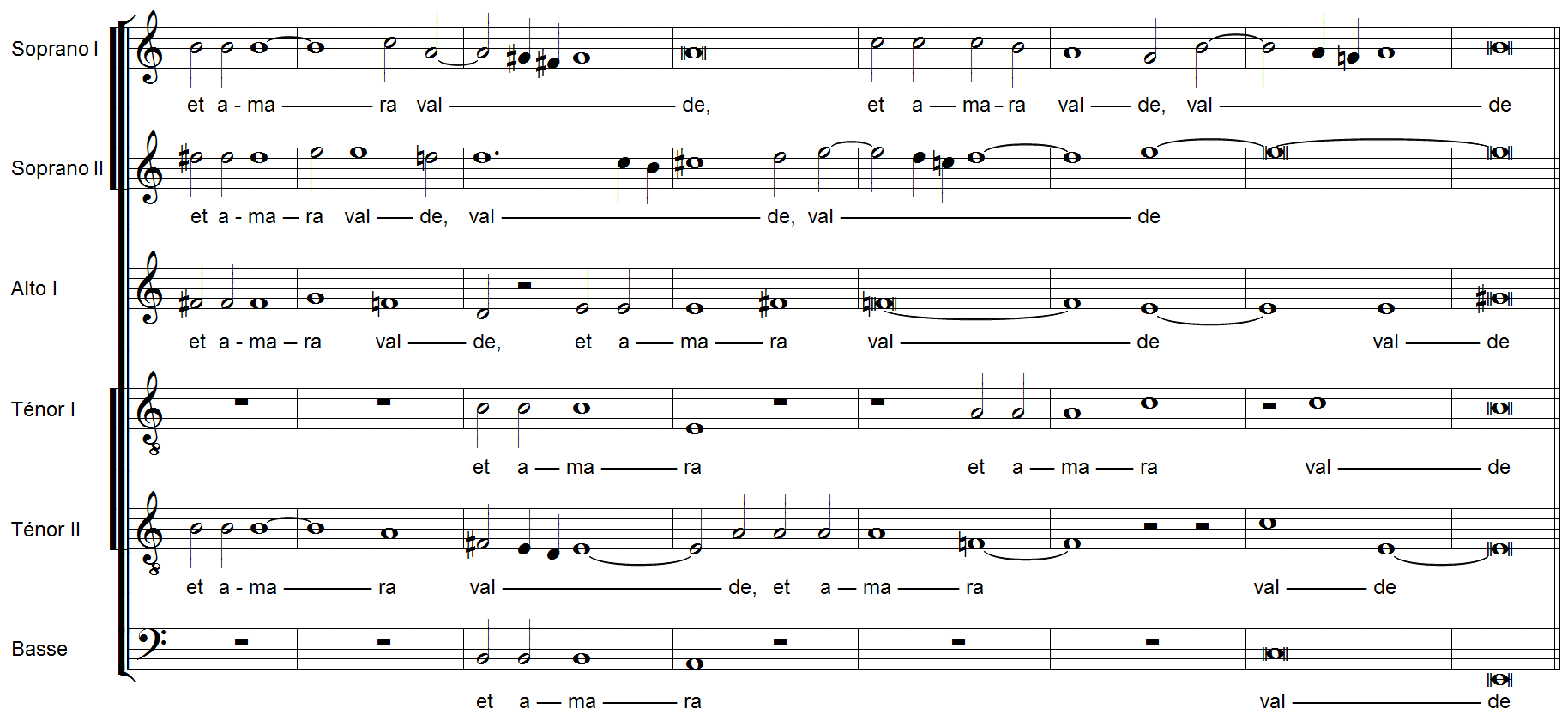
End of III, 3 Plange quasi virgo

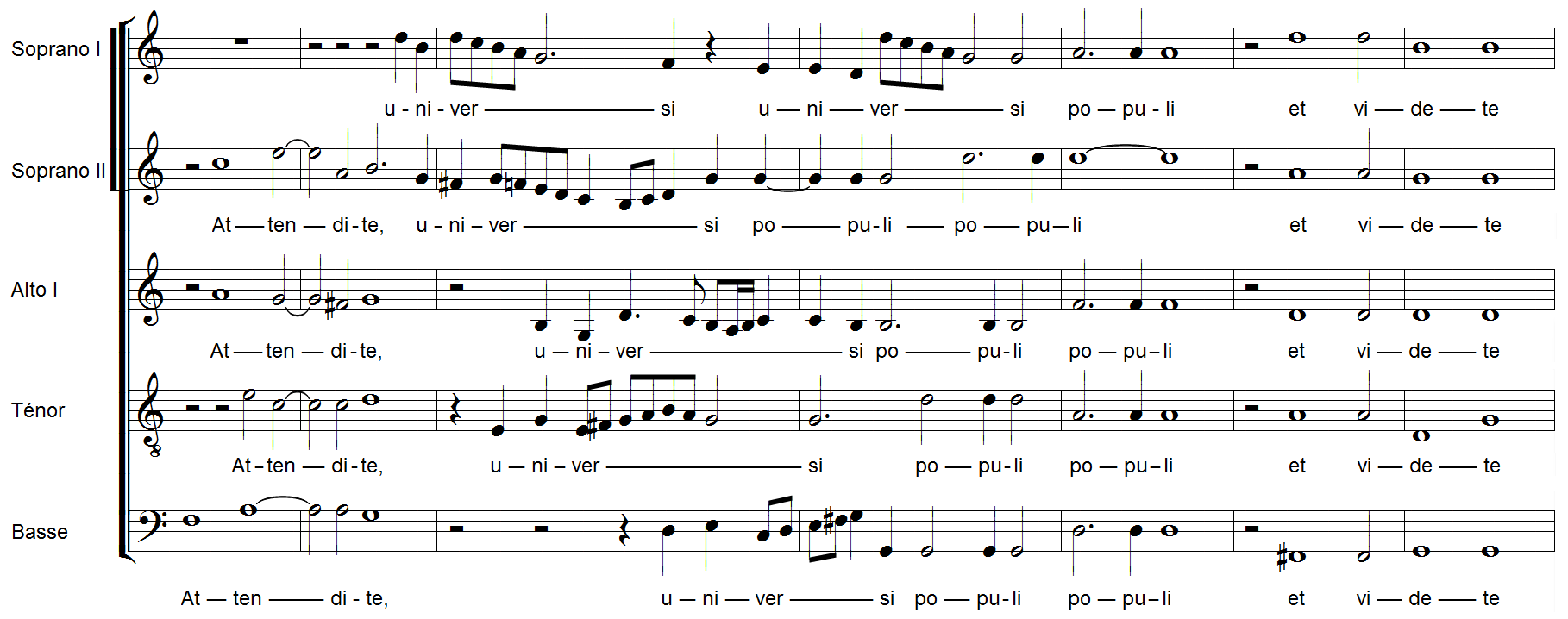
"Attendite..." part of III, 5 O vos omnes

1. Tenebrae Responsories for Maundy Thursday
  1. In monte Oliveti
  2. Tristis est anima mea
    Alex Ross writes about Gesualdo's setting of this responsory: "... begins with desolate, drooping figures that conjure Jesus’ prayer in Gethsemane (“My soul is exceeding sorrowful, even unto death”). It then accelerates into frenzied motion, suggesting the fury of the mob and the flight of Jesus’ disciples. There follows music of profound loneliness, radiant chords punctured by aching dissonances, as Jesus says, “I will go to be sacrificed for you.” The movement from inner to outer landscape, from chromatic counterpoint to block harmonies, humanizes Jesus in a way that calls to mind Caravaggio's New Testament paintings of the same period, with their collisions of dark and light."
  3. Ecce vidimus eum
  4. Amicus meus osculi
  5. Judas mercator pessimus
  6. Unus ex discipulis meis
  7. Eram quasi agnus innocens
  8. Una hora non potuistis
  9. Seniores populi consilium
2. Tenebrae Responsories for Good Friday
  1. Omnes amici mei dereliquerunt me et praevaluerunt insidiantes mihi
  2. Velum templi scissum est
  3. Vinea mea electa, ego te plantavi
  4. Tamquam ad latronem existis cum gladiis et fustibus cemprehendere me
  5. Tenebrae factae sunt, dum crucifixissent Jesum Judaei
  6. Animam meam dilectam tradidi in manus iniquorum
  7. Tradiderunt me in manus impiorum
  8. Jesum tradidit impius summis principibus sacerdotum, et senioribus populi
  9. Caligaverunt oculi mei fletu meo
3. Tenebrae Responsories for Holy Saturday
  1. Sicut ovis ad occisionem
  2. Jerusalem, surge
  3. Plange quasi virgo
  4. Recessit pastor noster
  5. O vos omnes
  6. Ecce quomodo moritur justus
  7. Astiterunt reges terrae
  8. Aestimatus sum
  9. Sepulto Domino
4. "et alia" – settings of:
  1. Miserere mei, Deus (Psalm 51)
  2. Benedictus (Luke 1:68–79)

For the Lauds of Holy Week

== Publication of the score ==
- Carlo Gesualdo, Responsoria et alia ad Officium Hebdomadae Sanctae spectantia, Giovanni Giacomo Carlino (Ioannes Iacobus Carlinus), 1611.
- Wilhelm Weismann and Glenn Watkins (editors). Tenebrae Responsoria in Carlo Gesualdo: Sämtliche Werke. Hamburg, Deutscher Verlag für Musik, 1957-1967.

== Recordings ==
Complete

- Gesualdo: Répons de la semaine sainte, A Sei Voci, 2CD Erato 97411; Warner Classics 2564 62782 (1982–1984)
- Gesualdo: Tenebrae, The Hilliard Ensemble, ECM New Series 1422/23 843 867 (1990)
- Carlo Gesualdo – Responsoria 1611, Collegium Vocale Gent, direction Philippe Herreweghe, PHI LPH010 (2012)
- Carlo Gesualdo: Responsoria 1611, La Compagnia del Madrigale, Glossa GCD922803 (2013)
- Gesualdo: Tenebrae, Graindelavoix (2019)

Selections

- Tenebrae Responsories for Maundy Thursday, The King's Singers, Signum SIGCD048 (2004)
- Tenebrae Responsoria (Maundy Thursday and Good Friday), Ensemble Arte Musica, direction Francesco Cera, Brilliant Classics 94804 (2014)
- Tenebrae Responses for Good Friday, Taverner Consort & Choir, direction Andrew Parrott, Sony Classical SK62977 (2000)
- Tenebrae Responsories for Holy Saturday, The Tallis Scholars, direction Peter Phillips, Gimell, CDGIM 015 (1987)
- Sabbato Sancto: Responsoria (Holy Saturday), Ensemble Vocal Européen, direction Philippe Herreweghe, Harmonia Mundi France HMF790120 (1990)
- Responsoria (Holy Saturday), Ensemble De Labyrintho, direction Walter Testolin, Stradivarius STR33842 (2009)
