= Pomponio Nenna =

Italian composer

Pomponio Nenna (baptized 13 June 1556 – 25 July 1608) was a Neapolitan Italian composer of the Renaissance. He is mainly remembered for his madrigals, which were influenced by Gesualdo, and for his polychoral sacred motets, posthumously published as Sacrae Hebdomadae Responsoria in 1622.

== Life ==
Pomponio Nenna was born in Bari, in Apulia at the Kingdom of Naples. His father, Giovanni Battista Nenna, was a city official in Bari and was the author of "Il Nennio : nel quale si ragiona di nobiltà", a book about nobility and virtuous character, published in 1542.

Pomponio Nenna probably studied with Stefano Felis in Bari. In 1574, his first pieces of music to be published were four villanelle which were included in the collections of "Villanelle alla Napolitana", edited by Giovanni Jacopo de Antiquis, who may also have been one of Nenna's teachers. In 1582, Nenna dedicated his first book of madrigals to Fabrizio Carafa, the Duke of Andria, near Bari. Carafa had nominated Nenna to be his successor and is also the man found in flagrante delicto with the composer Don Carlo Gesualdo's wife, both of whom were killed in 1590 by Gesualdo's own hand in one of the most famous murders in the history of music. Nenna seems nonetheless to have been on terms of friendship with Gesualdo, and had dedicated music to him. As Gesualdo was also Prince of Venosa, this may have been the most prudent political stance for Nenna to assume.

Nenna worked at the court of Gesualdo between 1594 and 1599, at which time it was once thought that Gesualdo, himself an amateur composer, studied with Nenna; but more recent musicological study suggests that the influence may have gone the other way.

Nenna's activities in the first decade of the 17th century are obscure, but he was probably in Naples from 1606 to 1607 and in Rome, in 1608. A curious remark concerning his skilled participation in a chess game in Naples, in 1606, is recorded in a manuscript book of discourses.

In April 1600, Leonora d'Este, the more fortunate second wife of Gesualdo, wrote a letter to her brother, then Cardinal Alessandro d'Este in Rome, in which she recommends Pomponio Nenna to him. Thus, it may have been his d'Este family connections that enabled Nenna to establish himself profitably in Rome.

He died on 25 July 1608, in Rome.

== Music and influence ==
Nenna followed the Neapolitan stylistic trends of the time. He borrowed from the work of Giulio Caccini, and certainly he exchanged musical ideas with Gesualdo. Some of Nenna's madrigals also make use of the antiphonal style of Andrea Gabrieli.

Nenna wrote eight books of madrigals; however, copies of the second and third books are no longer extant. Because of this, the change from his earlier style as exhibited in the first book of madrigals to that of his more mature style of the fourth might appear startling.

His use of chromaticism and a highly imitative musical language is experimental for its time, and mirrored in the work of Gesualdo, indicating a close working relationship between the two. Nenna uses dissonance to build tensions that intimately reflect the passions expressed in the texts, and he employs imitative melodic and rhythmic patterns among the parts as they move towards points of conflict that then frequently resolve suddenly.

The chromatic structures are sometimes surprising, as in the beginning of "La mia doglia s'avanza", whose opening chords move from G minor to F♯ major then D minor and finally C♯ major, commencing a series of descending chromatic figures. In "L'amoroso veleno", the voices use small, chromatic ascending scales to mimic the poison which slowly creeps up to the victim's heart.

In more than one madrigal, he uses a repeated musical phrase, composed to the text, "Vita de la mia vita" (Light of my Life), apparently as a kind of aural signature, or perhaps as a veiled reference to a specific individual.

The fifth book of madrigals was dedicated to Nenna's patron, Fabritio Branciforte, while the sixth was dedicated to Diana Vittoria Carafa, the spouse of the seducer of Gesualdo's wife. The eighth book, published in 1618, was edited by Ferdinando Archilei, a doctor of laws, amateur musician and friend of Nenna's in Rome, and this fact might suggest that Nenna did not live to see its publication.

He also wrote sacred choral music, including Tenebrae responsories for use during Easter and a psalm setting, all of which show a dignified and restrained approach, much in keeping with the Neapolitan style for liturgical music, and reflective of the work of the brothers Anerio and Gesualdo.

== Works ==
=== Madrigals ===
==== Il Primo Libro de madrigali à cinque voci, 1613 ====
First Book of Madrigals. The First Book of Madrigals also contains madrigals by Stefano Felis. In 1621 Carlo Milanuzzi added the 'continuo' part to the book.

1. "Eccomi pronta ai baci"
2. "Candida man ti bacio"
3. "Se la doglia e 'l martire"
4. "Ancide sol la morte"
5. "I tene miei sospiri"
6. "Qual fora a donna"
7. "Vedrò il mio sol - O mia luce o mia gioia"
8. "Voi negate ch'io v'ami"
9. "Asciugate i begli occhi"
10. "S'allor che più sperai"
11. "Ancide sol la morte"
12. "Vivo mio sol tu giri"
13. "Ahi, dispietata e cruda"
14. "La mia doglia s'avanza"
15. "Il tuo dolce candore"
16. "S'io taccio il duol s'avanza"
17. "Voi bramate ch'io more"
18. "Se gli occhi vostr'io miro"
19. "Sospir che dal bel petto"
20. "Ripiglia Ergasto - Aure liete e soavi"

==== Il quarto libro de madrigali à cinque voci, 1/1597? – 2/1609 ====
Fourth Book of Madrigals.

1. "Ahi dispietata vita"
2. "Cruda Donna e pietosa"
3. "O Donna troppo cruda e troppo bella"
4. "S'io vivo"
5. "Ma se da voi"
6. "Deh s'io v'ho dato il core"
7. "Ecco o mia dolce pena"
8. "Lumi miei cari Lumi"
9. "Volgete a me quei fugitivi rai"
10. "Vuoi tu dunque partire?"
11. "Non mi duol che non m'ami"
12. "O gradite o sprezzate"
13. "Che fai meco mio duolo"
14. "Apri il sen alle fiamme"
15. "Tu segui o bell'Aminta" (text by Clori)
16. "Amoroso mio foco"
17. "Invan cor mio tu brami"
18. "Dovrò dunque morire"
19. "Parto io si, ma il mio core"
20. "Occhi miei che vedeste"

==== Madrigali à Cinque voci. Quinto Libro, 1603 ====
Fifth Book of Madrigals.

1. "Deh! scoprite il bel seno"
2. "Mercè, grido piangendo"

...

==== Il Sesto Libro de Madrigali à cinque voci, 1607 ====
Sixth Book of Madrigals.

1. "Andianne à premer 'latte"
2. "Viviamo amianci, ò mia gradita Ielse"
3. "Voi sapete ch'io v'amo"
4. "Ch'io non t'amor cor mio - Ma se tu sei quel core"
5. "Legasti anima mia"
6. "Chi prende Amora gioco"
7. "Non può vana dolcezza - Del mio bel ciel sereno"
8. "Se non miro io mi moro" (S'io non miro non moro)
9. "Perch'io restasi in vita"
10. "Ardo misero amante - Et mi'è si dolce"
11. "Mentre ch'all'aureo crine"
12. "Temer donna non dei"
13. "Ecco ò dolce, ò gradita"
14. "Filli mentre ti miro"
15. "Quella candida mano"
16. "Amorosetto Neo"
17. "Così bella voi sete "
18. "Felice era il mio core"

==== Il Settimo Libro de Madrigali à Cinque Voci, 1608 ====
Seventh Book of Madrigals.

1. "S'egli è ver ch'io v'adoro"
2. "Godea del sol i rai"
3. "In due vermiglie labra"
4. "Con le labra di rose"
5. "Havera per la sua Ninfa"
6. "Che non mi date aita"
7. "Occhi belli ch'adoro"
8. "Filli mia s'al mio seno"
9. "Coridon del tuo petto"
10. "L'amoroso veleno"
11. "Non veggio il mio bel sole"
12. "Sospir, baci, e parole"
13. "Filli cor del mio core"
14. "Ardemmo insieme bella donna, ed io"
15. "Suggetemi suggete"
16. "Ove stavi tu auvolto"
17. "Fuggite pur fuggite"
18. "Scherzava Amor, e Cori"
19. "Amorosetto Neo"

==== L'Ottauo Libro de Madrigali à Cinque Voci, 1618 ====
Eighth Book of Madrigals.

1. "Leggiadra pastorella in treccle d'oro"
2. "Tosto ch'in don' gli chieggio"
3. "Rid' il Ciel' rid' il Sole"
4. "All'apparir de Sole"
5. "Già sospirai d'amore"
6. "Incenerit è l'petto"
7. "Il Ciel ti guardi amorosett' Armilla"
8. "Piccioletta farfalla"
9. "Lasso ch'io moro"
10. "Tolse dal Ciel' due stelle"
11. "Donna questo mio core"
12. "Si gioioso mi fanno i dolor miei"
13. "Filli non voi ch'io dica"
14. "O man' candid' e cara"

The Eighth Book also contains the following madrigals by other composers:

1. "E così vago il pianto" / Geruasio Melcarne
2. "Quando l'alba novella" / Gesualdo
3. "Quando mia cruda sorte" / Geruasio Melcarne
4. "All'ombra degl'allori" / Gesualdo
5. "Come vivi cor mio" / Gesualdo

==== Symphonia angelica di diversi eccellentissimi musici, 1585 ====
1. "Torno amato mio bene"

==== Del signor Alessandro di Costanzo ... Il primo libro de' madrigali à quattro voci, 1606 ====
1. "S'io taccio il duol s'avanza"

==== Christ Church. MS Mus. 37 ====
Richard Goodson Sr Manuscript, Madrigals by Pomponio Nenna.

1. "Madonna poi ch'ancider mi volete"

=== Bicinia ===
==== Bicinia sive cantiones suavissimae duarum vocum, 1609 ====
1. (Unrecorded chanson)

=== Villanelle ===
==== Il secondo libro delle villanelle alla napolitana a tre voci, 1574 ====
1. "Signora, io penso"

=== Motets ===
==== Sacrae Hebdomadae Responsoria, 1622 ====
1. "In monte Oliveti"
2. "Tristis est anima mea"
3. "Ecce ij videmus"
4. "Amicus meus osculi"
5. "Iudas mercator"
6. "Vnus ex discipulis"
7. "Eram quasi agnus innocens"
8. "Vna hora non posuistis"
9. "Seniores populi"
10. "Omnis amici mei"
11. "Velum templi"
12. "Vinea mea"
13. "Tanquam ad latronem"
14. "Tenebrae factae sunt"
15. "Animan meam"
16. "Tradiderunt me"
17. "Iesum tradit impius"
18. "Caligaverunt"
19. "Sicut ovis"
20. "Hierusalem surge"
21. "Plange quasi virgo"
22. "Recesit pastor noster"
23. "O vos omnes"
24. "Ecce quomodo moritur"
25. "Astiuerunt reges"
26. "Estimatus sum"
27. "Sepulto Domino"

==== Responsorij di Natale, e di Settimana Santa, 1622 ====
1. "Hodie nobis caelorum"
2. "Hodie nobis de caelo"
3. "Que vidistis pastores"
4. "O magnum mysterium"
5. "Beata dei genitrix"
6. "Sancta et immaculata"
7. "Beata viscera"
8. "Verbum caro facta est"
9. "Te Deum laudamus"
10. "Benedictus"
11. "Miserere"
12. "In monte Oliveti"
13. "Tristis est anima mea"
14. "Ecce ij videmus"
15. "Amicus meus osculi"
16. "Iudas mercator"
17. "Vnus ex discipulis"
18. "Eram quasi agnus innocens"
19. "Vna hora non posuistis"
20. "Seniores populi"
21. "Omnis amici mei"
22. "Velum templi"
23. "Vinea mea"
24. "Tanquam ad latronem"
25. "Tenebrae factae sunt"
26. "Animan meam"
27. "Tradiderunt me"
28. "Iesum tradit impius"
29. "Caligaverunt"
30. "Sicut ovis"
31. "Hierusalem surge"
32. "Plange quasi virgo"
33. "Recesit pastor noster"
34. "O vos omnes"
35. "Ecce quomodo moritur"
36. "Astiuerunt reges"
37. "Estimatus sum"
38. "Sepulto Domino"
39. "O Domine Iesu Christe" / Tomaso Pucci di Benevento

== Early Published Sources ==
- Il secondo libro delle villanelle alla napolitana a tre voci, de diversi musici di Barri; raccolte per I. de Antiquis, con alcune delle sue, novam. stamp / Venetia, Gardano, 1574. OCLC: 29934375
- Bicinia sive cantiones suavissimae duarum vocum : tam divinae musices tyronibus, quam eiusdem artis peritioribus magno usui futurae : nec non & quibusvis instrumentis accomodae; ex praeclaris huius aetatis authoribus collectae / Antwerpen, Phalèse, 1609. RISM 1609/18 OCLC: 165564608
- Pomponii Nennae, Equitis Caesarei, Sacrae hebdomadae responsoria : quae feria quinta in Coena Domini, feria sexta in Parasceve, & Sabbato sancto ad matutinas quinque vocibus concinuntur : cum basso ad organum / Romae : Apud Io. Baptistam Robletum, 1622. OCLC: 67302522
- Responsorij di Natale, e di Settimana Santa : a quattro voci / In Napoli : Nella Stamparia di Ottauio Beltrano, 1622. RISM A/I; N 380. RISM B/I, 1622, 7. OCLC: 51561390
- Di Pomponio Nenna ... Il Primo Libro de madrigali à cinque voci. / In Venetia Appresso Angelo Gardano, 1582. OCLC: 165333223
- Symphonia angelica di diversi eccellentissimi musici a IIII. V. et VI. voci / Anversa, Phalèse & Bellère, 1585. OCLC: 31261501
- Del signor Alessandro di Costanzo ... Il primo libro de' madrigali à quattro voci / Napoli, Per Gio. Battista Sottile, 1604. Et ristampato [er Gio. Battista Gargano, &] per Lucretio Nucci. Si vendono alla libraria di Pietro Paolo Riccio, (1604), 1616. (Contains 3 madrigals at the end by Dentice, marked "newly added" and 2 in the center by Nenna, "S'io taccio" and "La mia doglia")
- Di Pomponio Nenna ... Il quarto libro de madrigali à cinque voci / Venetia : Angelo Gardano & Fratelli, 1609. OCLC: 472343647
- Di Pomponio Nenna ... Madrigali à Cinque voci. Quinto Libro. Nouamente Stampati. Canto. (Alto.) (Tenore.) (Basso.) (Quinto.) / Venetia : Appresso l'Herede di Angelo Gardano, 1612. OCLC: 497707442
- Di Pomponio Nenna ... Il Sesto Libro de Madrigali à cinque voci. Canto. (Alto.) (Tenore.) (Basso.) (Quinto.) / Napoli : Nella Stamperia di G. B. Sottile. Per S. Bonino, 1607. OCLC: 497707457
- Di Pomponio Nenna ... Il Sesto Libro de Madrigali à cinque voci. Nouamente Ristampati. Canto. (Alto.) (Tenore.) (Basso.) (Quinto.) Stampa del Gardano. / Venetia : Ære Bartholomæi Magni, 1614. OCLC: 497707473
- Di Pomponio Nenna ... Il Settimo Libro de Madrigali à Cinque Voci. Canto. (Alto.) (Tenore.) (Basso.) (Quinto.) / Napoli : Nella Stampa di G. B. Sottile, per S. Bonino, 1608. OCLC: 497707495
- Di Pomponio Nenna ... L'Ottauo Libro de Madrigali à Cinque Voci. Nouamente ... dati in luce da F. Archilei, etc. Canto. (Alto.) (Tenore.) (Basso.) (Quinto.) / Roma : Appresso G. B. Robletti, 1618. OCLC: 497707536
- Di Pomponio Nenna ... Il Primo Libro de madrigali à quattro voci. / In Venetia Appresso Alessandro Vincenti, 1613. Reprinted 1621, 1624.

== Manuscripts ==
- Florence. Biblioteca Nazionale Centrale. Ms. (Magl.XIX.106bis). (Containing 10 madrigals by Nenna for four voices in score, most likely copied from the printed volume of 1621, and 12 ricercars by Giovanni de Macque)
- Christ Church. MS Mus. 37 Richard Goodson Sr Manuscript Madrigals by Pomponio Nenna (containing copies of 9 madrigals from the 1st Book, and 1 undetermined)

== Notes ==
On the back of the frontispiece of a copy of the 1621 edition of the First Book of Madrigals, found in the collection of the Liceo Musicale di Bologna, composer Alessandro Grandi had written in 1623 a dedication wherein he begins, "Escono questi Madrigali del Signor Cauaglier Nenna dal sepolchro delle tenebre alla luce del sole", or "These madrigals of Signor Nenna exit from out the darkness of the grave to the light of the sun". This would suggest that by 1623 Nenna had been dead for several years.

== References and further reading ==
- Dagnino, Eduardo. Madrigali di Pomponio Nenna / ed. Eduardo Dagnino, Instituto Italiano per la Storia della Musica, Roma, 1942. (Originally intended as a 2-vol. set with v. 2 being a complete bibliography of Nenna's madrigals; v. 2 never published?) Reprinted 1979.
- Pompilio, Angelo. I madrigali a quattro voci di Pomponio Nenna (1613) / Studi e testi per la storia della musica, 5., Florence, Leo S. Olschki, 1983. ISBN 88-222-3195-3
- Articles "Pomponio Nenna", "Carlo Gesualdo," "Ferrara" The New Grove Dictionary of Music and Musicians, ed. Stanley Sadie. 20 vol. London, Macmillan Publishers Ltd., 1980. ISBN 1-56159-174-2
- Reese, Gustave. Music in the Renaissance. New York, W.W. Norton & Co., 1954. ISBN 0-393-09530-4
- Larson, Keith A. "Pomponio Nenna", Grove Music Online ed. L. Macy (Accessed September 16, 2005), (subscription access)
- Watkins, Glenn. "Gesualdo: the man and his music" / Oxford University Press, 1973 reprinted 1991. ISBN 0-19-816197-2, ISBN 978-0-19-816197-4

== Recordings ==
- Nenna, "Pomponio Nenna : Madrigals and Motets". Accademia Monteverdiana; Denis Stevens, director; Trinity Boys Choir, Croydon; Accademia Chorus : Nonesuch H-71277 STEREO 1973. LP OCLC: 80474420
- Nenna, "Neapolitan madrigals & motets". Gesualdo Consort; Gerald Place, dir. Libra Real Sound LRS 122 1982. Cassette OCLC: 24788991 (5 works, from Book 4, "S'io taccio", from Villanelle, "Signora, io penso"; from Book 5, "Mercè grido piangendo"; from Sacrae Hebdomadae, "O magnum mysterium", "Tristis est anima mea")
- Nenna, "Madrigals & motets from Renaissance Naples". Gesualdo Consort; Gerald Place, dir. ASV Quicksilva QS 6210 1982, 1997. CD OCLC: 40618819 (5 works, from Book 4, "S'io taccio", from Villanelle, "Signora, io penso"; from Book 5, "Mercè grido piangendo"; from Sacrae Hebdomadae, "O magnum mysterium", "Tristis est anima mea")
- Nenna, "Stabat Mater". Cappella Musicale della Cattedrale di Verona; Alberto Turco, dir. Bongiovanni GB 5023-2 1989. CD OCLC: 25881897 (1 work, from Sacrae Hebdomadae: "Recessit pastor noster")
- Nenna, "Italia mia". Huelgas Ensemble; Paul Van Nevel, dir. Series: Vivarte. Sony Classical SK 48065 1992. CD OCLC: 26994214 (2 works, from Book 4, "Ancide sol la morte", "La mia doglia s'avanza")
- Nenna, "Polifonia sacra a Napoli tra XVI e XVIII secolo". Ensemble Vocale di Napoli; Antonio Spagnolo, dir. Foné 94 F 01 1994. CD OCLC: 33015447 (2 works from Sacrae Hebdomadae, "In monte Oliveti", "Caligaverunt")
- Nenna, "Spesso gli leglo : Neapolitan madrigals of the 16th and 17th century". Ensemble Vocale di Napoli; Antonio Spagnolo, dir. Edition: Tonträger. Series: The Golden Age of Naples. Niccolo 2000. CD OCLC: 254876794
- Nenna, "Il primo libro de' madrigali à 4 voci, Napoli, 1613". Ensemble Vocale Palazzo Incantato, Sergio Lella, dir. Tactus TC551401 2001. CD OCLC: 52724705
- Nenna, "Barock im Vatikan". Gambenensemble "The Earle his Viols", (Irene Klein, Jessica Marshall, Brigitte Gasser, Randall Cook); Evelyn Tubb, soprano; Marie Nishiyama, harp. Marc Aurel Edition MA 20030 2005. CD OCLC: 70866662 (2 works: "S'io taccio il duol s'avanza"; "Ecco, o mia dolce pena")
- Nenna, "La Tavola Cromatica". Evelyn Tubb, soprano; The Earle His Viols, Richard Earle, (Irene Klein, Jessica Marshall, Brigitte Gasser, Randall Cook), Marie Nishiyama, harp. Raum Klang 2302 CD 2006.
- Nenna, "O dolorosa gioia". Concerto Italiano; Rinaldo Alessandrini, dir. Opus 111 P2000 2006. CD OCLC: 493128846 (1 work, from Book 4, "Occhi miei che vedeste")
