= Scipione Lacorcia =

Italian composer

Scipione Lacorcia (fl. 1590–1620) was a Neapolitan composer of madrigals.

Biographical data for Lacorcia is almost non-existent. Apart from his activity from 1590 to 1620, culminating in his third book of madrigals for 5 voices, little is known.

Book II is dedicated to Alessandro Miroballo, marchese di Bracigliano. Book III, dated 1 October 1620 is prefaced with a humble plebeian dedication to his lordship Francesco Filomarino (1600–1678), principe della Rocca. Book III also features two "guest" madrigals by the nobleman Ettore de la Marra (ca. 1570–1634) signore di Baiano e Castelfranco, who like Filomarino and the amateur madrigalist Scipione Dentice was a member of the five family seggio Capuana who participated in the city government. Ettore de la Marra was also a lutenist and guitarist in Carlo Gesualdo's Accademia and has two other surviving madrigals in the collection Teatro de Madrigali (Gargano and Nucci, Naples 1609). The poems in Lacorcia's Book III are mainly anonymous, perhaps indicating that they may be from local aristocratic poets.

Lacorcia is considered one of the madrigalists most influenced by Carlo Gesualdo, along with Francesco Genuino, Crescenzio Salzilli, Agostino Agresta, Giuseppe Palazzotto-Tagliavia, Antonio de Metrio, and Giacomo Tropea.

Lacorcia's name appears in a list of madrigalists in print, on the envelope of a letter from Heinrich Schütz in Venice, 23 April 1632, to Philip Hainhofer in Dresden, but not in Schütz's handwriting.

== Works ==
- Madrigali Libro I a 5, - lost
- Madrigali Libro II a 5, Carlino, Naples 1616, survives complete.
- Madrigali Libro III a 5, Vitale, Naples 1620, survives complete.

== Recordings ==
- Musica Vulcanica Complete recording of Book III, together with the 4 surviving madrigals by Ettore de la Marra, with instrumental pieces played on a reconstructed chromatic cembalo universale by Ascanio Mayone, Giovanni de Macque, and Gesualdo . Gesualdo Consort Amsterdam, cond. Harry van der Kamp. Sony Vivarte. 2006
