= Agresta =

Surname list

Agresta is a surname. Notable people with the surname include:

- Agostino Agresta (c.1600–1617), Italian composer
- Maria Agresta (born 1978), Italian operatic soprano.
- Renzo Agresta (born 1985), Brazilian fencer
- Robert A. Agresta (born 1983), American politician
