= Pietro Spada =

Italian musician (1935–2022)

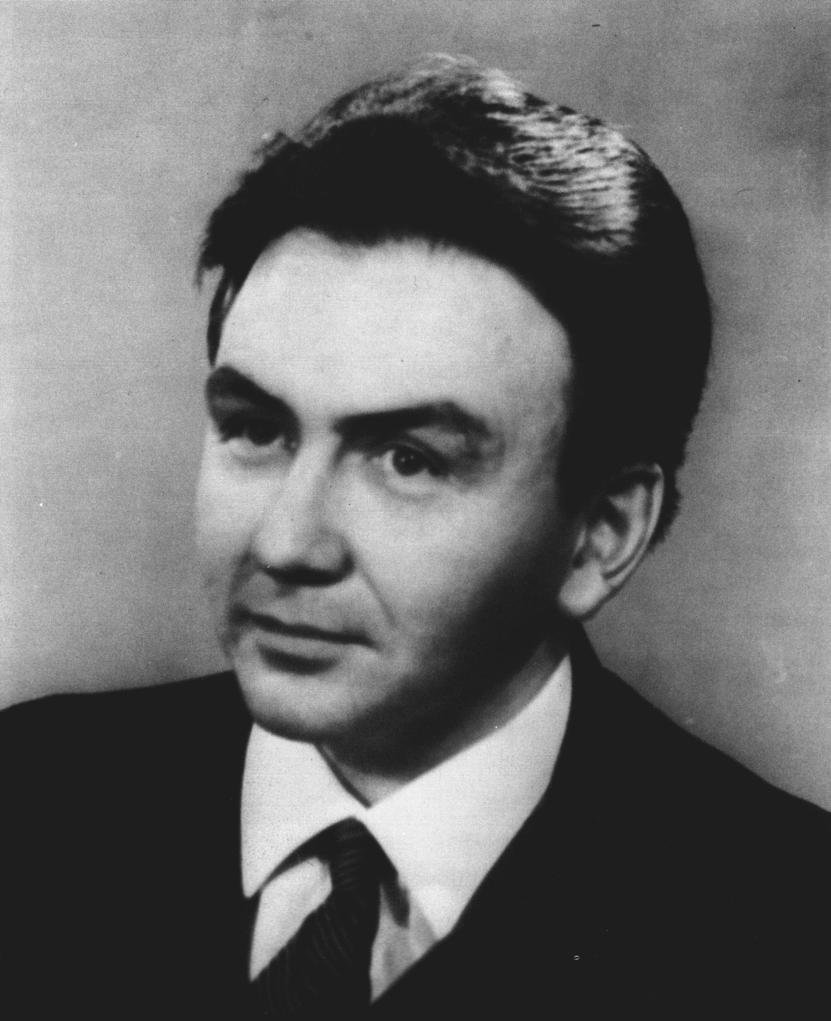
- Born: July 29, 1935; Rome, Italy
- Died: December 31, 2022; Italy
- Education: Conservatorio Santa Cecilia; Milan Conservatory
- Occupations: Pianist, Musicologist
- Known for: Interpretations of lesser-known composers; recordings of John Field
- Spouse: Nancy Pasawicz (m. 1967)
- Children: Marcantonio M. Spada
- Awards: Steinway Artist

Pietro Spada (29 July 1935 – 31 December 2022) was an Italian pianist and musicologist. He was particularly noted for his technically masterful and vivid interpretations of works by lesser-known composers and his recordings of the piano music of John Field are highly regarded.

== Biography ==
Born in Rome, Spada was the second of three sons of Maria Teresa Fodale and Massimo Spada. Although not born into a musical dynasty – his parents both had law degrees – the household was never devoid of music, frequented by many well-known musicians of the time including the violinist Gioconda de Vito and the tenors Giacomo Lauri-Volpi and Tito Schipa. His great-grandfather, Jacopo Ferretti, wrote the libretto for Rossini’s la Cenerentola and collaborated as librettist with other composers such as his close friend Gaetano Donizetti, Giovanni Pacini and Saverio Mercadante.

Spada began his study of the piano at the age of 12 under Vito Carnevali. A short time later he entered the Conservatorio Santa Cecilia in Rome to study under Tito Aprea completing his diploma in piano with highest honors in 1956. Subsequently he received coaching but no formal lessons from the Italian pianist and conductor Carlo Zecchi who became one of his closest friends. In addition he frequented lessons with Arturo Benedetti Michelangeli. Spada underwent composition courses with Vincenzo di Donato, Carlo Pinelli and Andrea Mascagni, completing his studies at the Milan Conservatory with Giorgio Federico Ghedini.

== Career ==
Spada performed widely in many countries including Japan, Germany, North and South America, Russia, England and toured with the Hallé Orchestra under Sir John Barbirolli. Spada performed under various eminent conductors including Charles Bruch, Dean Dixon, Antal Dorati, Arthur Fiedler, Anatole Fistoulari, Jascha Horenstein, Peter Maag, John Pritchard, Thomas Sanderling, Ferruccio Scaglia, Lovro Von Matacic, Francesco d'Avalos and many others.

Spada was appointed Guest Professor of piano at Florida State University in August 1966. The following year he joined the piano faculty of the Cincinnati College Conservatory of Music and later that of Indiana University in Bloomington, Indiana. At every university he both taught and performed before deciding to return to Italy in 1970. Later on he taught at the Turin Conservatory, the Rome Conservatory and the historical Naples Conservatory of San Pietro a Majella. There he spent his longest period as a piano professor, intensely researching in one of the most important autograph manuscript collections of the world before deciding to leave teaching.

== Research ==
During his residence in the United States he was given a grant to do research on Muzio Clementi, producing a definitive edition of Clementi's surviving symphonies. Continuing in his research, he published and recorded many unedited keyboard compositions by Giovanni Paisiello, Gaetano Donizetti, John Field and others. Spada, together with Massimo Boccaccini, founded Boccaccini & Spada Editori through which he issued a huge volume of hitherto unpublished compositions of great Classic composers.

Prominent soloists and conductors who have presented many of Spada’s editions include Claudio Abbado, Riccardo Chailly, Gianandrea Gavazzeni, Severino Gazzelloni, Riccardo Muti, Luciano Pavarotti, Jean-Pierre Rampal and Thomas Schippers.

Spada recorded for the first time in 1960 and produced a vast amount of repertoire on CD, including a set of three discs in 1988 containing all of Ferruccio Busoni's Bach transcriptions. He was a Steinway Artist.

== Personal life and death ==
In September 1967 Spada married his piano student Nancy Pasawicz and they had a son, Marcantonio M. Spada, born in Rome in 1970.

Spada died on 31 December 2022, at the age of 87.
