= Stefano Felis =

Italian composer

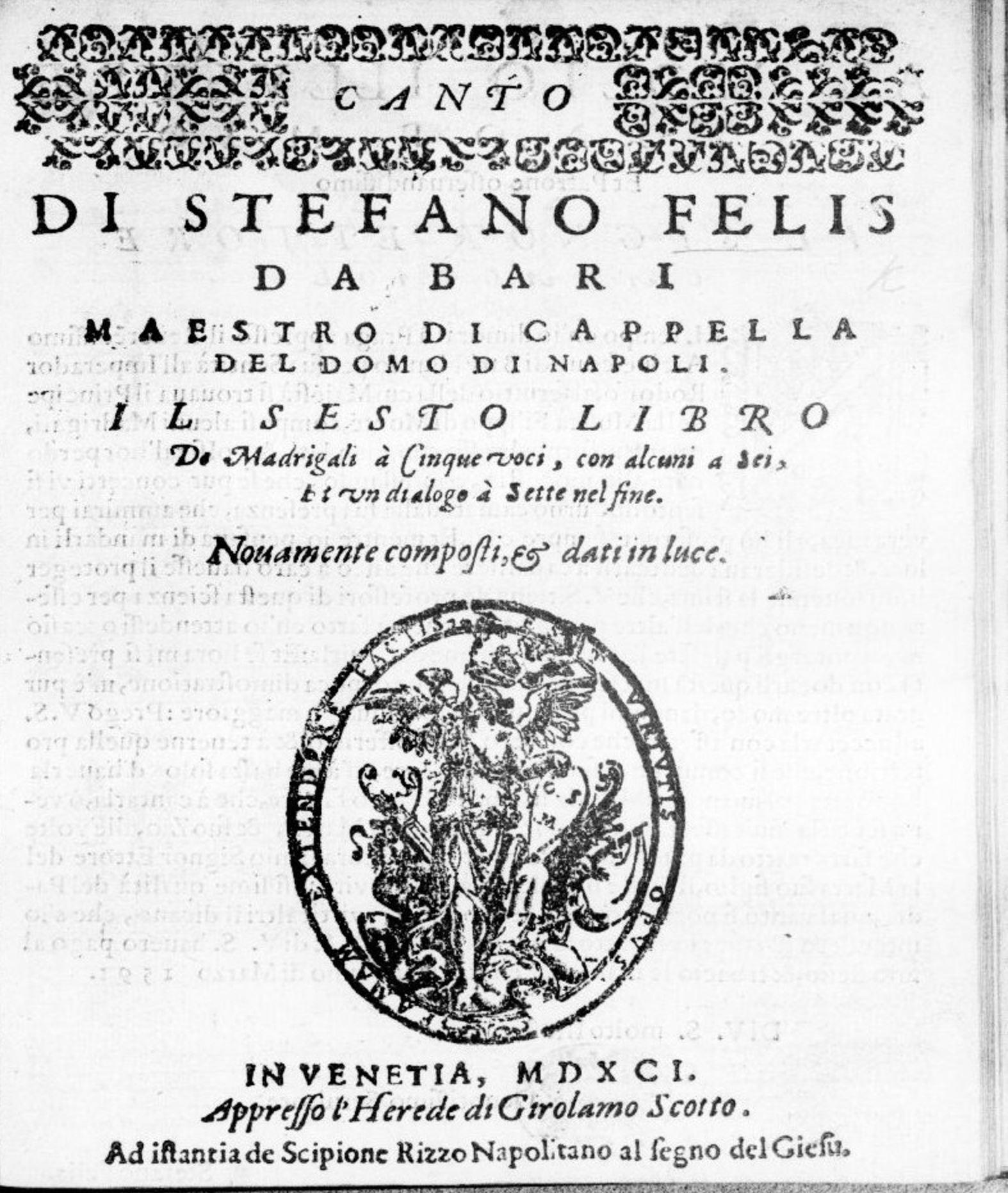
- The title page of one of Felis's books of madrigals.
- Born: c. 1538; Bari
- Occupations: composer, madrigalist, and maestro di cappella

Stefano de Maza Gatto also known as Stefano Felis (baptised in Bari on 20 January 1538; 25 September 1603), was a Neapolitan Italian composer of the Renaissance, and the collaborator and probable teacher of composer Pomponio Nenna. He composed madrigals, sacred motets, and choral settings of the Mass.

Felis was born in Bari, in the province of Apulia of the Kingdom of Naples, where he became a canon at Santa Nicola. He later became Maestro di Cappella of the cathedral in Naples.

He accompanied the papal nuncio, Antonio Puteo, on a journey to the court of Rudolph II in Prague during the 1580s. It was in Prague that his first book of masses was published in 1588 by the printer Georgius Nigrinus, and Felis later remarked upon his stay in Prague in the preface to his Sixth Book of Madrigals, published in Venice in 1591.

As an educator, Felis seems to have had a profound effect on the succeeding generation of musicians; Carlo Gesualdo, Giovan Battista Pace, Giovan Donato Vopa, and Pomponio Nenna are counted among his pupils.

In Pomponio Nenna's first published collection of madrigals, Il Primo Libro de madrigali à cinque voci, (c. 1603), there appear several madrigals by Felis. As a teacher, Felis might have allowed the young Nenna to add these works to his pupil's first publication, thereby ensuring its success.

== Works ==
=== Madrigals ===
- Harmonia celeste ... nelle quale si contene una scielta dei migliori madrigali che hoggidì si cantino, 1583
  - Al vostro dolce azuro
  - Nova beltà somma virtù
- Musica Transalpina, 1588
  - Sleepe mine onely Jewell. (Sonno scendesti)
  - Thou bring'st her home. (Tu là ritorni)
- Di Stefano Felis ... Il Sesto Libro de Madrigali a Cinque voci, 1591
  - Caro amoroso neo
- Libro nono di madrigali a cinque voci novamente composti, et dati in luce, 1602
  - Amarilli, ove sei

=== Masses ===
- Missa super voces musicales la sol fa mi re ut

== Sheet music ==
- Il primo libro de madrigali a sei voci Novamente composto & dato in luce. / Venetia, Gardano, 1579 RISM A/I; F 0211.; RISM B/I; 1579–05. (Contains works by Felis, Ridolfo Romano, G.F. Violanta.)
- Il quarto libro de madrigali a cinque voci con alcuni a sei, & uno echo a otto nel fine, novamente composti, & dati in luce. / Venetia, Vincenzi & Amadino, 1585. RISM A/I; F 0212.; RISM B/I; 1585–23. (Contains works by Felis, G. de Macque, P. Nenna.)
- Di Stefano Felis ... Il Sesto Libro de Madrigali a Cinque voci, con alcuni a Sei, et un dialogo a Sette nel fine, etc. Canto. (Alto.) (Tenore.) (Basso.) (Quinto.). / Venetia : Appresso l'Herede di G. Scotto. Ad istanzia de Scipione Rizzo, 1591. OCLC: 498809433 (This work also contains madrigals by F. di Monte, R. Rodio, S. Dentice and M. Affrem.)
- Libro nono di madrigali a cinque voci novamente composti, et dati in luce. / Venetia, Vincenti, 1602. RISM A/I; F 0214.; RISM B/I; 1602–05. (Contains works by Felis, G.B. Vannelli.)
- Harmonia celeste ... nelle quale si contene una scielta dei migliori madrigali che hoggidì si cantino / Antwerp, 1583.
- Liber secundus motectorum quinis senis octonisque vocibus / Venetijs, Gardanum, 1585. RISM A/I; F 0206; RISM B/I; 1585-02 (Contains works by Felis, C. Gesualdo, R. Rocco)
- Mottettorum cum quinque vocibus, liber tertius / Venetiis, Scoti, 1591. RISM A/I; F 0208; RISM B/I; 1591-02 (Contains works by Felis, S. Dentice, P. de Monte)
- Liber quartus motectorum, quæ quinis, senis, ac octonis, concinuntur vocibus nunc primum impressus / Venetiis, Vincentium, 1596. RISM A/I; F 0209; RISM B/I; 1596-04 (Contains works by S. Felis and G.B. Vanelli.)
- Musica Transalpina. Madrigales translated of foure, five, and sixe parts, chosen out of divers excellent Authors / Imprinted at London by Thomas East, the assigne of William Byrd, 1588. (Two works of Felis are here, with texts in English and Italian)
- Stephani Felis regalis ecclesiæ S. Nicolai bariensis canonici liber quartus motectorum quæ quinis, senis, ac octonis, concinuntur vocibus, nunc primum impressus. / Venetiis : Vincentium, 1596. RISM A/I; F 0209; RISM B/I; 1596-04 (Contains works by S. Felis and G.B. Vanelli.)
- Sacrarum symphoniarum continuatio diversorum excellentissimorum authorum quaternis, V. VI. VII. VIII. X. & XII. vocibus tàm vivis, quam instrumentalibus accommodata. / Noribergæ : Kaufmann, 1600. Edition: Octava vox. OCLC: 314296648 (Includes works by several others)

== Manuscripts ==
- Landeskirchliches Archiv in Nürnberg. Manuscript. St. Egidien 53. Choirbook, 1582. (Includes masses by Stuberus, Stephano Felis Barensi, Orlandus, Philippus Schondorff, Phillipe de Monte, and Jachet de Mantua)
- California. San Marino. Huntington Library. MSS EL 25A (after 1602) (Contains one 5-part madrigal, "Amarilli ove sei")
