= Carlo Bollino =

Italian journalist (born 1961)

- Born: November 15, 1961; Italy
- Occupations: Journalist, writer, media owner
- Employer(s): La Gazzetta del Mezzogiorno; ANSA
- Known for: Work in Albania; Director of La Gazzetta del Mezzogiorno; ANSA correspondent in Israel and the Palestinian Territories
- Awards: Cronista Award (2009); Terra del Sole Award (2012); Il Sallentino Special Recognition (2013)

Carlo Bollino (15 November 1961) is an Italian journalist, writer, and media owner active in Albania.

== Biography ==
After living for 14 years in Tirana, in July 2007 he moved to the Middle East, where he took over the leadership of the ANSA correspondence office in Israel and the Palestinian Territories.

In May 2008 he returned to Bari as director of La Gazzetta del Mezzogiorno. In these years of return to the front of Italian journalism, his civil passion is also rekindled. Among other things, his initiative to oppose an Italian government law that threatens to limit the freedom of the press, earned him the 2009 Cronista award of the city of Viareggio and the appreciation of the national union of Italian journalists.

In March 2021 the Albanian Prime Minister, Edi Rama, paid tribute to the Apulian/Albanian Carlo Bollino, former Director of 'La Gazzetta del Mezzogiorno', during his visit to the City Hall – where he was welcomed by Mayor Antonio Decaro – on the occasion of his visit to Bari.

== Awards and recognition ==
- On 30 June 2012 he received the Terra del Sole Awards as an exponent of the professional excellence of Apulia.
- On 31 August 2013 he received a special recognition from the Il Sallentino award, sponsored by the Presidency of the Italian Republic.

== Publications ==
In 1987 he published the book "La posta in gioco", an investigation into the murder in Nardò of Renata Fonte, published by Carmine De Benedittis and Antonella Mascali: from the text was then made into a film, entitled La posta in gioco (film)|homonymous directed by Sergio Nasca.
