= Gesualdo Consort Amsterdam =

- Origin: Amsterdam, Netherlands
- Genres: vocal music
- Years active: 1984–present
- Award: Klassieke Muziekprijs 2010
- Website: gesualdoconsort.nl

Gesualdo Consort Amsterdam is a Dutch vocal ensemble founded in 1984 by Harry van der Kamp. Named after the Italian Renaissance composer Carlo Gesualdo, its focus is less known vocal music from the 16th and 17th centuries. Until 2010, they recorded the complete vocal works by Jan Pieterszoon Sweelinck, called Het Sweelinck Monument, which changed the view on the composer. It earned them the 2010 Klassieke Muziekprijs.

== History ==
Harry van der Kamp, a bass singer in opera and concert with a focus on historically informed performance, founded the Gesualdo Consort Amsterdam to perform less known madrigals of the 16th and 17th centuries, of composers such as Carlo Gesualdo, Emilio de' Cavalieri and Scipione Lacorcia, and also music of the 20th century. Van der Kamp was both director and singer, and he wrote informative booklets about the composers and the ensemble's approach.

Van der Kamp and the Gesualdo Consort achieved a first complete recording of the vocal works of Jan Pieterszoon Sweelinck, on 17 CDs in October 2010, called Het Sweelinck Monument. Until then Sweelinck was known as a composer for keyboard instruments. His vocal works include motet settings of the 150 melodies of the Genevan Psalter, each introduced by the melody alone. A reviewer for Rondo magazine noted their "consistently clean intonation, tonal balance, and the perfect blending of individual horizontal lines into an overall sound that remains consistently transparent". The recording was awarded the "Klassieke Muziekprijs 2010". Queen Beatrix of the Netherlands was present at the commemorative event at the Oude Kerk van Amsterdam, where Sweelinck had been organist, on 20 October 2010.

They also recorded Gesualdo's madrigal collections I, II and III. A reviewer noted: "Not only is the tuning miraculous but the singers lead us through the phrases in full understanding of where the line is leading, where the harmony will spring to next and what the text demands. This is coupled with superb and expressive use of the consonants."
