= Renata Fonte =

Italian politician (1951–1984)

- Born: 10 March 1951; Nardò, Apulia, Italy
- Died: 31 March 1984 (aged 33); Nardò, Apulia, Italy
- Cause of death: Assassination
- Occupation: Politician
- Known for: Investigations into environmental crime
- Political party: Italian Republican Party
- Spouse: Attilio Matrangola

Renata Fonte (3 March 1951 – 31 March 1984) was an Italian politician, who served as assessor of culture, in the city council of Nardò (Lecce).

== Murder ==
On 31 March 1984 she was shot dead while returning home from a council meeting. The actual perpetrators of the murder were quickly arrested, along with the person who had ordered it, Antonio Spagnolo the candidate next in line for a seat at the municipal elections. Although the motive remains uncertain, it is believed that the killing came in response to her political fight to prevent the subdivision and urban speculation in Porto Selvaggio bay.
