= Harry van der Kamp =

Dutch bass singer (1947–2026)

- Van der Kamp, c. 1990
- Born: 1947; Kampen, Netherlands
- Died: 17 August 2026 (aged 79)
- Education: Amsterdam Sweelinck Conservatory
- Occupations: Classical bass singer; Academic teacher
- Organizations: Gesualdo Consort Amsterdam; University of the Arts Bremen
- Awards: Order of the Netherlands Lion
- Website: harryvanderkamp.nl

Harry van der Kamp (1947 – 17 August 2026) was a Dutch bass singer in opera and concert. He sang in choir with Cappella Amsterdam that he cofounded, and from 1974 for decades with the Nederlands Kamerkoor. He performed 30 roles with the Dutch National Opera, mostly in Baroque opera but also contemporary works. He worked as a soloist with prominent ensembles of historically informed performance.

Van der Kamp founded the Gesualdo Consort Amsterdam in 1984 in order to perform less known madrigals of the 16th and 17th centuries. He led them in recording the complete vocal works by Jan Pieterszoon Sweelinck, which changed the view on the composer and earned him the Order of the Netherlands Lion. He was also an academic voice teacher.

== Life and career ==
Born in Kampen in 1947, van der Kamp sang there in a boys' choir. He studied first law in Amsterdam and, when he did not enjoy it, tried psychology. Then he studied singing at the Amsterdam Sweelinck Conservatory; he also worked as a flight attendant for KLM to fund his studies. His teachers were Elizabeth Cooymans and Max van Egmond. He attended master classes with Alfred Deller and Pierre Bernac.

In 1970, van der Kamp was one of the singers who founded the Cappella Amsterdam. He was a member of the Nederlands Kamerkoor from 1974 to 1994, serving as their artistic director from 1982 to 1987, when he introduced new literature and won conductors such as Eric Ericson, Uwe Gronostay and Tõnu Kaljuste. Daniel Reuss, a conductor of the chamber choir, noted: "His singing had a purity, honesty and directness that you simply couldn't ignore ... and "a lower register that was never woolly or muddy. ... The text always had to be intelligible; for him, that took precedence over the beauty of the sound."

As a soloist he also worked mainly in Early music and Baroque, including Baroque opera of composers such as Francesco Cavalli, Stefano Landi, Antonio Cesti, Henry Purcell, Jean-Philippe Rameau, Reinhard Keiser, and George Frideric Handel. He sang 30 roles with the Dutch National Opera, in Monteverdi's operas L'Orfeo and L'incoronazione di Poppea, and also in later works such as Rêves d'un Marco Polo by Claude Vivier and Alexander Knaifel's Alice im Wunderland. Bernard Holland described his appearance in 1996 as Zoroastro in Handel's Orlando with Les Arts Florissants, conducted by William Christie, in the New York Times: "Harry van der Kamp is the only man, managing Zoroastro's bass arias with pleasing clarity and heft." In 2003, van der Kamp appeared in Handel's Deidamia at the Göttingen International Handel Festival and as Seneca in L'incoronazione di Poppea at the Vancouver Festival.

Van der Kamp was often the vox Christi in the annual St Matthew Passion of the Netherlands Bach Society. He recorded several Bach cantatas and the Mass in B minor with Gustav Leonhardt. On a recording of Bach's St John Passion with Sigiswald Kuijken he appeared together with his teacher Max van Egmond and Christoph Prégardien as the Evangelist. In 1996, he recorded the St Matthew Passion with Frans Brüggen and the Orchestra of the Eighteenth Century in a live performance in the Vredenburg Castle in Utrecht, together with Nico van der Meel (Evangelist), Kristinn Sigmundsson (Jesus), María Cristina Kiehr, Ian Bostridge, and Peter Kooy, among others. He performed regularly with the choir Junge Kantorei in Eberbach Abbey, in Monteverdi's Vespro della Beata Vergine in 1978, in Handel's Messiah in 1979, in Bach's St. Matthew Passion in 1981 and 1985, and in his Mass in B minor in 1983.

He worked with ensembles such as the Hilliard Ensemble, Musica Antiqua Köln and Les Arts Florissants. With the Huelgas Ensemble, he recorded works of Matteo da Perugia.

In 1984, van der Kamp founded the Gesualdo Consort Amsterdam to perform less known madrigals of the 16th and 17th centuries, of composers such as Carlo Gesualdo, Emilio de' Cavalieri and Scipione Lacorcia, and also music of the 20th century. Van der Kamp and the Gesualdo Consort completed Het Sweelinck Monument, a first complete recording of the vocal works of Jan Pieterszoon Sweelinck, on 17 CDs in October 2010. Until then Sweelinck was known as a composer for keyboard instruments. His vocal works include motet settings of the 150 melodies of the Genevan Psalter, each introduced by the melody alone. A reviewer for Rondo magazine noted their "consistently clean intonation, tonal balance, and the perfect blending of individual horizontal lines into an overall sound that remains consistently transparent". The recording was awarded the "Klassieke Muziekprijs 2010". Queen Beatrix of the Netherlands was present at the commemorative event at the Oude Kerk van Amsterdam, where Sweelinck had been organist, on 20 October 2010, and van der Kamp was appointed a knight of the Order of the Netherlands Lion. Van der Kamp and the Gesualdo Consort also recorded Gesualdo's madrigal collections I, II and III and Emilio de' Cavalieri's Lamentationes Jeremiae Prophetae. After the completion of the Sweelinck recordings, he began to sing more often with Cappella Amsterdam again.

In 1994, van der Kamp was appointed professor at the Hochschule für Künste Bremen. He also taught at the Stiftung Kloster Michaelstein. He gave master classes and served as juror for competitions.

Van der Kamp had Waldenström macroglobulinemia. He died on 17 August 2026, at the age of 79.
