= Agostino Agresta =

Italian composer

Agostino Agresta (fl. 1600–1617) was a Neapolitan composer working at the beginning of the 17th century, who can be seen as having been strongly influenced by Carlo Gesualdo. Agresta's only known surviving works are unaccompanied madrigals, including a complete book of six-voice pieces.

== Biography ==
Incredibly little is known about the life and career of Agresta, including neither the circumstances of his birth or death. Apart from his works (discussed below), there are only two contemporary or near-contemporary references to him.

He and his elder brother Giovanni Antonio are listed together in the third book of Scipione Cerreto's 1601 Della prattica musicale as excellent composers operating in Naples ('Compositori eccellenti della Città di Napoli, che oggi vivono'); however, no works by Giovanni Antonio survive. And a 1664 work by the Neapolitan scholar Camillo Tutini lists him as a madrigalist in a section devoted to promoting the cultural claims of Naples against Rome.

=== Madrigali a sei voci ... Libro primo (1617) ===
Agresta's only surviving book of madrigals, Madrigali a sei voci ... Libro primo, was published in Naples in 1617 by Costantino Vitale, and dedicated to Don Roderico di Salazar. Salazar had been commissioner of contraband in the provinces of Terra di Bari and Capitanata (today the province of Foggia) but was prosecuted in 1607 for extortion and corruption (Larson 1985: 758); his status in 1617 is unknown.

Agresta's relationship to him is similarly unclear, although Larson has speculated that the composer may have been employed by Salazar as a tutor for his children, in a similar capacity to that of his brother in the household of the Count of Roccella (the records of the Banco Mari, which are contained in the Archivio di Stato in Naples, list a payment made to Giovanni Antonio Agresta on 18 March 1598).

While composers in the northern Italian Peninsula were beginning to move away from what was regarded as the old-fashioned polyphonic madrigal without continuo, Naples remained the most important centre for its composition and publication. In this context, Agresta's Madrigali a sei voci ... Libro primo occupies an important position, as during the first 30 years of the 17th century only two books of six-part unaccompanied madrigals were published in Naples: Agresta's and Gesualdo's posthumous collection of 1626 (of which only the Quinto part-book survives). While it is impossible to speculate with any accuracy on the basis of such scant evidence, Larson suggests that Agresta's madrigals may reveal something of the style of Gesualdo's incomplete book.

Watkins labels Agresta a minor figure among those Neapolitan composers who were influenced by Gesualdo, but suggests that posterity's opinion of him (and others) might well be different if more of his works had survived. Larson goes further and declares that Agresta 'occasionally surpassed (Gesualdo) in the degree of slow chromatic durezze e ligature and diatonic, scalar points of imitation in quavers and semiquavers', claiming that 'the latter are usually longer and more lively and intricate than Gesualdo's'.

=== Agresta's other madrigals ===
Apart from the Madrigali a sei voci ... Libro primo, three other madrigals identified as being by Agresta survive, all for five voices:

- 'Io mi sento morir', in Giovanni Vincenzo Macedonio di Mutio's Il secondo libro de madrigali a cinque voci, published in Naples in 1606 by Giovanni Giacomo Carlino. An incomplete and damaged set of part-books exists in the library of the Conservatorio di Musica San Pietro a Majella in Naples (missing Quinto, incomplete Soprano).
- 'Caro dolce ben mio', in Giardino novo bellissimo di varii fiori musicali scieltissimi il secondo libro de madrigali a cinque voci raccolti per Melchior Borchgrevinck organista del serenissimo re di Danemarcka, published in Copenhagen in 1606 by Heinrich Waltkirch (RISM 1606^{5}), which survives complete in the British Library, London, and incomplete (Soprano and Alto part-books only) in the Landesbibliothek Kassel. (This madrigal has previously been edited and published in Glahn et al. 1983)
- 'Io ard'e moro, Donna', in Teatro de madrigali a cinque voci. De diversi eccellentiss. musici napolitani (RISM 1609^{16}), published in Naples in 1609 by Giovanni Battista Gargano and Lucretio Nucci. The only surviving copy of this is in the Landesbibliothek Kassel, with an incomplete Quinto part.

The inclusion of a piece by Agresta in the Borchgrevinck collection of 1606 raises many questions. Melchior Borchgrevinck was court organist to King Christian IV of Denmark, and in 1599 led a party of Danish musicians to Venice to study with Giovanni Gabrieli, returning there in the winter of 1601–2. He was greatly respected by his contemporaries, being praised by Orazio Vecchi in the dedication to Christian IV of Le veglie di Siena (1604), who also added that Gabrieli considered Borchgrevinck 'one of the most outstanding musicians of our time'.

The two volumes of Giardino novo (the first appeared in 1605, dedicated to Christian IV) included madrigals by some of the most popular Italian composers of the day, including Claudio Monteverdi, Benedetto Pallavicino and Giaches de Wert, as well as Borchgrevinck and other Danish composers. However, there are a number of works by composers who may not unfairly be deemed minor figures, including Giovanni Paolo Nodari, Curtio Valcampi and Grisostomo Rubiconi, and which Lewis suggests may not previously have been printed.

Apart from 'Caro dolce ben mio', all Agresta's works were published in Naples, and there is no record of him ever having worked or travelled away from Naples, thus seemingly making him very much a southern Italian composer. How then did his works find their way north to Venice, and why was he considered a composer of sufficient stature to be included in a volume of works dedicated, in a politically charged, to King James I of England? While it was not unusual for Neapolitan composers to have their works printed in Venice (see Larson 1985: 873–882 for a list of such works), the absence of any other evidence that links Agresta to Venice makes it hard to gauge his status and reputation during his lifetime.

There are two other references to Agresta which appear not to have been noted by other authors. In Schofield and Dart's article describing the contents of the British Library manuscript now known as Egerton MS 3665, believed to have been compiled by Francis Tregian (son of the more famous Catholic exile of the same name), Agresta is listed among the composer represented in the selection of over 700 Italian madrigals included in the manuscript; it is implied in the article, although not clearly, that Agresta's contribution comes from his Madrigali a sei voci ... Libro primo.

In the mid-1990s Alfred Noe completed a comprehensive study of the contents of the library of Albert Fugger (of the famous Augsburg banking family), which was purchased by Mathias Mauchter in 1655 for Emperor Ferdinand III and now forms part of the Österreichische Nationalbibliothek in Vienna.

In the catalogue made by Mauchter at the time of purchase, there is an entry on the last page of the music section which reads 'Il Primo lib.° de Madrigali a 5. di Agostino Agresta'. No collection of five-part madrigals by Agresta survives, nor any reference to one elsewhere. However, Noe identifies this volume as Agresta's 1617 Madrigali a sei voci ... Libro primo from its contents, regarding the 'a 5' as a copyist's mistake.

=== Sources ===
Two complete copies of Agresta's Madrigali a sei voci ... Libro primo survive, one in the Collection 'G. Thibault' of the Bibliothèque nationale de France in Paris, the other in the library of the Conservatorio di Musica San Pietro a Majella in Naples; both are in good condition, and each is identical to the other. The print is on the large part free from errors.

=== The contents of Madrigali a sei voci ... Libro primo ===
Keith Larson has dealt extensively with the contents of Agresta's Madrigali a sei voci ... Libro primo; here are some extra details to his analysis.

Numbers 1 to 8 are written in an 'ordinary' clef combination (Canto and Sesto in C1 clef, Alto in C3 clef, Tenore and Quinto in C4, and Basso in F4), while numbers 9 to 15 are written in 'high' clefs (Canto and Sesto in G2, Alto in C2, Tenore and Quinto in C3, and Basso in F3 – commonly known as chiavette), suggesting downwards transposition.

If one follows Adriano Banchieri's suggestion in his 1614 Cartella musicale of transposing pieces written in chiavette down by a perfect 4th when the printed key signature contains one flat and by a perfect 5th when it contains no flats, the transposed ranges of the individual voice parts of numbers 9 to 15 all become rather lower than the ranges of numbers 1 to 8. Depending on the singers involved in a performance, a downwards transposition of either a tone or a minor 3rd for numbers 9 to 15 is suggested.

The last piece in the collection, 'Io penso e nel pensar' is unusual in many ways. The anonymous poem is a dense play on the words 'penso' ('I think'), 'pensar' ('to think') and 'pensier' ('thought'); most striking is its use of frequently changing time signatures, which are different in each part, including such proportions as 1:10, 14:6, 6:5 and 3:7. Larson describes it as 'an intellectual challenge to virtuoso singers', while Watkins suggests that its 'novel and highly mannered proportional complexities ... while appearing theoretical as well as anachronistic, may well be an attempt by the composer to suggest expressive tempo variability'.

=== The texts ===
The choice of poetry comprises both old and new authors, and the majority of the texts are also set by many other composers. These include four by Giambattista Marino, four by Petrarch and two by Giovanni Battista Guarini (plus one other, number 7, which is attributed to Guarini); there are four anonymous poems.

Numbers 6, 8 and 13 are the only settings of their poems recorded in Il nuovo Vogel, while the text of number 15 (discussed above) is set elsewhere only by Francesco Mazza, in his own first book of six-part madrigals published in Venice in 1590. (A slightly different version of the poem was set by Jéhan Gero in the collection published by Costanzo Festa in 1541 and subsequently in Gero's own collection of 1543.)

== Bibliography ==
- Bernstein, Jane A. (1998): Music Printing in Renaissance Venice: the Scotto press (1539–1572), Oxford: Oxford University Press
- Glahn, Henrik et al. (ed.) (1983): 20 Italienske madrigaler fra Melchior Borchgrevinck Giardino Novo I–II København 1605/06 (20 Italian madrigals from Melchior Borchgrevinck Giardino Novo I–II Copenhagen 1605/06), Copenhagen: Institute of Musicology, University of Copenhagen
- Larson, Keith A. (1985): The Unaccompanied Madrigal in Naples from 1536 to 1654, Ph.D thesis at Harvard University, Cambridge, Massachusetts
- Larson, Keith A. (2001): 'Agresta, Agostino' in Grove Music Online/Oxford Music Online
- Lewis, Susan G. (2000): 'Danish diplomacy and the dedication of Giardino novo II (1606) to King James I', Danish Yearbook of Musicology 28, 9–18
- Lewis, Susan G. (2005): 'Italian music and Christian IV's urban agenda for Copenhagen', Scandinavian Studies vol. 77, Fall, 365–382
- Noe, Alfred (1994): Die Präsenz der romanischen Literaturen in der 1655 nach Wien verkauften Fuggerbibliothek: 1. Band: Diplomatische Ausgabe des Codex 12.579 der Österreichischen Nationalbibliothek («Mauchter-Katalog»), Amsterdam: Rodopi
- Noe, Alfred (1997): Die Präsenz der romanischen Literaturen in der 1655 nach Wien verkauften Fuggerbibliothek: 3. Band: Die Texte der «Musicales», Amsterdam: Rodopi
- Schofield, Bertram and Thurston Dart (1951): 'Tregian's Anthology', Music & Letters vol. 32, no. 3, 205–216
- Vogel, Emil, François Lesure and Claudio Sartori (1977): Bibliografia della musica italiana vocale profana pubblicata dal 1500 al 1700, 3 vols., Pomezia: Staderini (cited as Il nuovo Vogel)
- Watkins, Glenn (1991): Gesualdo: the man and his music (2nd edition), London: Clarendon Press
