= Anerio =

Anerio may refer to two notable brothers who were composers in Italy:

- Felice Anerio (c. 1560–1614)
- Giovanni Francesco Anerio (1567–1630)
