= Francesco d'Avalos =

Italian conductor and composer

Francesco d'Avalos (11 April 1930 in Naples – 26 May 2014 in Naples) was an Italian conductor and composer. Holder of the aristocratic titles of Prince d'Avalos and Marquis of Vasto and Pescara, d'Avalos was also a descendant of the uncle of Maria d'Avalos, the murdered first wife of Carlo Gesualdo.

d'Avalos acknowledged that the Italian composer Antonio Favasta convinced his parents to allow him to study music. He began music studies at age 12, including piano studies with Marta De Conciliis, and later with Vincenzo Vitale. He subsequently studied composition with Renato Parodi. He considered Psiche, written at seventeen, as his first composition. He graduated with honours from the Conservatory of San Pietro a Majella in Naples, with a degree in composition. He also studied philosophy at the University of Naples. He studied conducting at the Accademia Chigiana in Siena, and his conducting mentors included Paul van Kempen, Franco Ferrara and Sergiu Celibidache. From 1951 to 1954, he was a music critic for Il Quotidiano.

In 1972, Nino Rota recruited d'Avalos as a composition teacher to the Conservatory in Bari, where he remained until 1979. d'Avalos then accepted a faculty post at the Naples Conservatory, where he remained until 1998. He was a guest conductor with various orchestras both in his native Italy and elsewhere in Europe. He made commercial recordings for such labels as ASV, IMP, Chandos, Brilliant, Amadeus, and Nireus.

d'Avalos composed two symphonies for soprano and orchestra. His other compositions include:

- Maria Venosa for soloists, chorus and orchestra.
- Qumran for orchestra, for soloists, chorus and orchestra.
- Hymne an die Nacht for orchestra
- Studio Sinfonico for orchestra
- Psiche e Eros for orchestra
- Musica per un dramma immaginario (for orchestra
- Vexilla Regis for chorus and orchestra
- Lines for soprano and orchestra
- Il Fiume Wang for soprano and strings
- Sonata da chiesa for strings
- Suite Slava for strings
- Quintet for piano and strings
- In Memoriam for piano and orchestra
- Idillio for piano and string orchestra

His awards and honours included:

- Composition Prize "Marzotto Prize Selection 1958"
- "Grand Prix International du Disque Académie Charles Cros – Paris 1990" for recordings of symphonic works of Martucci
- "Mra Award 1991" for the recording of the Third Symphony of Joachim Raff
- Special Prize of the Carriera del Centro Incontro delle Arti Della Monaco (2010)
- Prize of the President of the Republic "Oltre l'Orizzonte nel 2010"

In 2005, Bietti published d'Avalos' book La crisi dell'Occidente e la presenza della storia – Il significato del ventesimo secolo attraverso l'evoluzione della musica (The Crisis of the West and The Presence of History – The Meaning of the Twentieth Century Through the Evolution of Music). In November 2013, his autobiography was published.
