= Claudio Sartori =

Italian musicologist and bibliographer (1913–1994)

Claudio Sartori

Claudio Sartori (1 April 1913 – 11 March 1994) was an Italian musicologist.

== Life and career ==
Sartori was born in Brescia, Italy, on 1 April 1913. He studied at the University of Pavia and the University of Strasbourg. From 1938 to 1942, Sartori worked as an assistant librarian at the Bologna Conservatory. Here, he developed his interest in musical sources and published several articles on musicology.

During World War II, he joined the Italian resistance movement, serving as the editor of Il Ribelle, an underground, anti-fascist newspaper. Additionally, he participated in numerous efforts to aid Jews and partisans. His active participation in the Resistance was galvanized by his own background; his Jewish mother, Pia, endured discrimination under Italian racial laws.

After the war, Sartori began a career as a journalist in Milan, writing for the newspaper Il Popolo di Milano. In 1947, he was appointed to the library of the Milan Conservatory. Henceforth, he devoted himself to extensive musicological research. Sartori published works on many Italian music publishers, including Ottaviano Petrucci, Antonio Gardano, and Ricordi. His efforts were concentrated on the cataloguing of the musical sources, believing that music bibliography was a "means of arriving at a deeper and surer knowledge of music itself".

Beginning in 1955, Sartori was a member of the executive committee of the International Association of Music Libraries, Archives and Documentation Centres (IAML). In 1959, he was appointed to the Biblioteca Nazionale Braidense. Together with Mariangela Donà, he founded the Ufficio Ricerca Fondi Musicali (URFM) in 1965, which he directed until his retirement. Utilizing data collected through the URFM, Sartori completed a bibliography of printed Italian instrumental music before 1700, I libretti italiani a stampa dalle origini al 1800, also called Catalogo Sartori.

Sartori spent his retirement living in a musicians' home. He continued working on his catalog of Italian opera librettos until the day before his death on 11 March 1994.

== Works ==
- I libretti italiani a stampa dalle origini al 1800. Catalogo analitico con 16 indici, Cuneo, Bertola & Locatelli Editori, 1990–1994, his major and last work. (Reprint 2024: Vienna, Hollitzer 2024, ISSN 2960-5830 [print], ISSN 2960-5849 [E-Book])
