= Carlo Gesualdo =

Italian prince, composer and murderer (1566–1613)

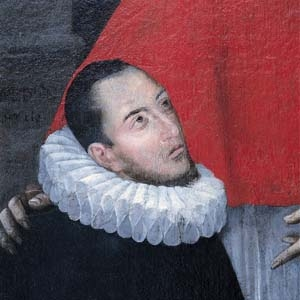
1609 donor portrait of Gesualdo from Il Perdono di Gesualdo

Carlo Gesualdo da Venosa (between 8 March 1566 and 30 March 1566 – 8 September 1613) was an Italian nobleman and composer. Though both the Prince of Venosa and Count of Conza, he is better known for writing madrigals and pieces of sacred music that use a chromatic language not heard again until the late 19th century. He is also known for killing his first wife and her aristocratic lover upon finding them in flagrante delicto (having sex).

== Biography ==
=== Early life ===
Gesualdo's family had acquired the principality of Venosa, in what is now the Province of Potenza, Southern Italy, in 1560. He was probably born on 30 March 1566, three years after his older brother, Luigi, though some sources have stated that he was born on 8 March. Older sources give the year of birth as c. 1560 or 1561, but this is no longer accepted. A letter from Gesualdo's mother, Geronima Borromeo, indicates that the year is most likely 1566. Gesualdo's uncle was Carlo Borromeo, later Saint Charles Borromeo. His mother was the niece of Pope Pius IV.

Carlo was most likely born at Venosa, then part of the Kingdom of Naples, but little else is known about his early life. "His mother died when he was only seven, and at the request of his uncle Carlo Borromeo, for whom he was named, he was sent to Rome to be set on the path of an ecclesiastical career. There he was placed under the protection of his uncle Alfonso (d. 1603), then dean of the College of Cardinals, later unsuccessful pretender to the papacy, and ultimately Archbishop of Naples." His brother Luigi was to become the next Prince of Venosa, but after his untimely death in 1584, Carlo became the designated successor. Abandoning the prospect of an ecclesiastical career,, he married, in 1586, his first cousin, Donna Maria d'Avalos, the daughter of Carlo d'Avalos, prince of Montesarchio and Sveva Gesualdo. They had one child, a son, Don Emmanuele.

Gesualdo had a musical relationship with Pomponio Nenna, though whether it was student-to-teacher, or colleague-to-colleague, is uncertain. Regardless of this, however, he had a single-minded devotion to music from an early age, and is said to have shown little interest in anything else. In addition to the lute, he played the harpsichord, and guitar. In addition to Nenna, Gesualdo's accademia included the composers Giovanni de Macque, Scipione Dentice, Scipione Stella, Scipione Lacorcia, Ascanio Mayone, and the nobleman lutenist Ettorre de la Marra.

=== Homicide ===
Some years into her marriage with Gesualdo, Donna Maria began an affair with Fabrizio Carafa, third Duke of Andria and seventh Count of Ruvo. On the night of 16 October 1590, at the Palazzo San Severo in Naples, the two lovers were caught in flagrante by Gesualdo, who killed them both on the spot.

The day after the killing, a delegation of Neapolitan officials inspected the room in Gesualdo's apartment where the killings had taken place, and interrogated witnesses. The delegation's report did not lack in gruesome details, including the mutilation of the corpses and, according to the witnesses, Gesualdo going into the bedroom a second time "because he wasn't certain yet they were dead".

The Gran Corte della Vicaria found Gesualdo had not committed a crime.

=== Successor ===
About a year after the gruesome end of his first marriage, Gesualdo's father died and he thus became the third Prince of Venosa and eighth Count of Conza.

=== Ferrara years ===
By 1594, Gesualdo had remarried, this time to Leonora d'Este, the niece of Duke Alfonso II. That year, Gesualdo ventured to Ferrara, the home of the d'Este court and also one of the centers of progressive musical activity in Italy, especially the madrigal; Gesualdo was especially interested in meeting Luzzasco Luzzaschi, one of the most forward-looking composers in the genre. Leonora moved with Gesualdo back to his estate in 1597. In the meantime, he engaged in more than two years of creative activity in the innovative environment of Ferrara, surrounded by some of the finest musicians in Italy. While in Ferrara, he published his first book of madrigals. He also worked with the concerto delle donne, the three virtuoso female singers who were among the most renowned performers in the country, and for whom many other composers wrote music.

In a letter of 25 June 1594, Gesualdo indicated he was writing music for the three women in the concerto delle donne; however, it is probable that some of the music he wrote, for example, that in the newly developing monodic and/or concertato styles, has not survived.

=== Return to Gesualdo and final years ===
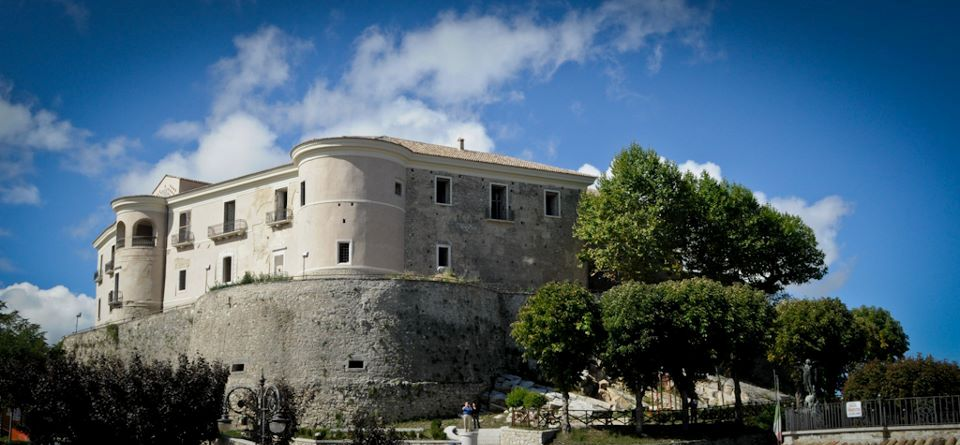
Castle of Gesualdo

After returning to his castle at Gesualdo from Ferrara in 1595, he set up a situation similar to the one that existed in Ferrara, with a group of resident virtuoso musicians who would sing his own music. While his estate became a center of music-making, it was for Gesualdo alone. With his considerable financial resources, he was able to hire singers and instrumentalists for his own pleasure. He rarely left his castle, taking delight in nothing but music. His most well-known music was published in Naples in 1603 and from the castle of Gesualdo (with printer Giovanni Giacomo Carlino) in 1611. The most notoriously chromatic and difficult portions of it were all written during his period of self-isolation.

The relationship between Gesualdo and his new wife was not good; she accused him of abuse, and the Este family attempted to obtain a divorce. She spent more and more time away from the isolated estate. Gesualdo wrote many angry letters to Modena where she often went to stay with her brother. According to Cecil Gray and Peter Warlock, "She seems to have been a very virtuous lady ... for there is no record of his having killed her."

In 1600, Gesualdo's son by his second marriage died. It has been postulated that after this Gesualdo had a large painting commissioned for the church of the Capuchins at Gesualdo, showing Gesualdo, his uncle Carlo Borromeo, his second wife Leonora, and his son, underneath a group of angelic figures; however, some sources suspect the painting was commissioned earlier, as the identity of the child is unclear.

Late in life he suffered from depression. According to Campanella, writing in Lyon in 1635, Gesualdo had himself beaten daily by his servants, keeping a special servant whose duty it was to beat him "at stool", and he engaged in a relentless, and fruitless, correspondence with Cardinal Federico Borromeo to obtain relics, i.e., skeletal remains, of his recently canonized uncle Carlo Borromeo, with which he hoped to obtain healing for his mental disorder and possibly absolution for his crimes. Gesualdo's late setting of Psalm 51, the Miserere, is distinguished by its insistent and imploring musical repetitions, alternating lines of monophonic chant with pungently chromatic polyphony in a low vocal tessitura.

Gesualdo died in isolation, at his castle Gesualdo in Avellino, three weeks after the death of his son Emanuele, his first son by his marriage to Maria. One 20th-century biographer has raised the possibility that he was murdered by his wife. He was buried in the chapel of Saint Ignatius, in the Church of the Gesù Nuovo, in Naples. The sepulchre was destroyed in the earthquake of 1688. When the church was rebuilt, the tomb was covered over, and now lies beneath it. The burial plaque, however, remains visible.

== Compositions and style ==
Moro lasso al mio duolo (2:40)
Performed by MIT Chamber Chorus (William Cutter, director)

The evidence that Gesualdo was tortured by guilt for the remainder of his life is considerable, and he may have given expression to it in his music. One of the most obvious characteristics of his music is the extravagant text setting of words representing extremes of emotion: "love", "pain", "death", "ecstasy", "agony" and other similar words occur frequently in his madrigal texts, most of which he probably wrote himself. While this type of word-painting is common among madrigalists of the late 16th century, it reached an extreme development in Gesualdo's music.

His music is among the most experimental and expressive of the Renaissance, and without question is the most wildly chromatic. Progressions such as those written by Gesualdo did not appear again in Western music until the 19th century, and then in a context of tonality.

Gesualdo's published music falls into three categories: sacred vocal music, secular vocal music, and instrumental music. His most famous compositions are his six books of madrigals, published between 1594 and 1611, as well as his Tenebrae Responsoria, which are very much like madrigals, except that they use texts from the Passion, a form (Tenebrae) used by many other composers. As in the later books of secular madrigals, he uses particularly sharp dissonance and shocking chromatic juxtapositions, especially in the parts highlighting text passages having to do with Christ's suffering, or the guilt of St. Peter in having denied him.

The first books of madrigals that Gesualdo published are close in style to the work of other contemporary madrigalists. Experiments with harmonic progression, cross-relation and violent rhythmic contrast increase in the later books, with Books Five and Six containing the most famous and extreme examples (for instance, the madrigals "Moro, lasso, al mio duolo" and "Beltà, poi che t'assenti", both of which are in Book Six, published in 1611). There is evidence that Gesualdo had these works in score form, in order to better display his contrapuntal inventions to other musicians, and also that Gesualdo intended his works to be sung by equal voices, as opposed to the concerted madrigal style popular in the period, which involved doubling and replacing voices with instruments. In addition to the works which he published, he left a large quantity of music in manuscript. This contains some of his richest experiments in chromaticism, as well as compositions in such contemporary avant-garde forms as monody. Some of these were products of the years he spent in Ferrara, and some were specifically written for the virtuoso singers there, the three women of the concerto di donne.

Characteristic of the Gesualdo style is a sectional format in which relatively slow-tempo passages of wild, occasionally shocking chromaticism alternate with quick-tempo diatonic passages. The text is closely wedded to the music, with individual words being given maximum attention. Some of the chromatic passages include all twelve notes of the chromatic scale within a single phrase, although scattered throughout different voices. Gesualdo was particularly fond of chromatic third relations, for instance juxtaposing the chords of A major and F major, or even C-sharp major and A minor, as he does at the beginning of "Moro, lasso, al mio duolo".

== Reception ==
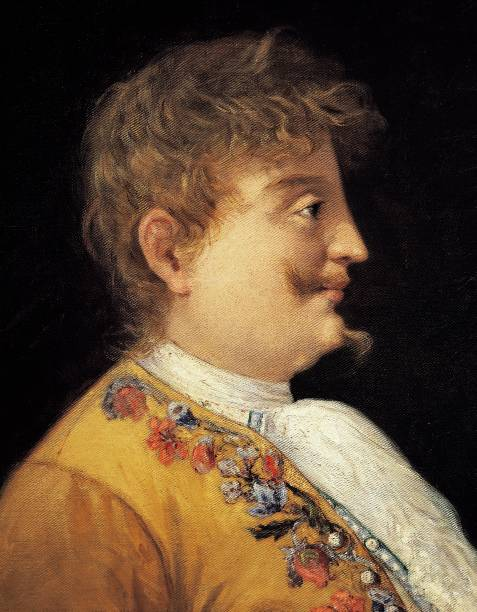
Portrait of Carlo Gesualdo, Painting by Francesco Mancini, c. 18th century

The fascination for Gesualdo's music has been fuelled by the sensational aspects of his biography. In 2011, Alex Ross wrote in The New Yorker:

If Gesualdo had not committed such shocking acts, we might not pay such close attention to his music. But if he had not written such shocking music we would not care so much about his deeds. Many bloodier crimes have been forgotten; it’s the nexus of high art and foul play that catches our fancy.

In his own lifetime, the salacious details of Gesualdo's killing of his first wife and her lover were widely publicized, including in verse by poets such as Tasso and an entire flock of Neapolitan poets, eager to capitalize on the sensation. The accounts of his cruelty were expanded with apocryphal stories such as the alleged killing of an illegitimate child of Donna Maria and her lover, which according to one variant of the made-up story was "suspended in a bassinet and swung to the point of death". Until the 1620s his music was imitated by Neapolitan composers of polyphonic madrigals such as Antonio Cifra, Michelangelo Rossi, Giovanni de Macque, Scipione Dentice, Girolamo Frescobaldi and Sigismondo d'India.

After the Renaissance, Gesualdo's life story and his music were largely forgotten until the 20th century: in 1926, Gray and Warlock published their book on Gesualdo. The life of Gesualdo provided inspiration for numerous works of fiction and musical drama, including short stories by Anatole France and Julio Cortázar. Several composers responded to Gesualdo's music: In 1960, Igor Stravinsky wrote Monumentum pro Gesualdo, containing an arrangement of Gesualdo's madrigal "Beltà, poi che t'assenti". In 1995, Alfred Schnittke wrote an opera based on Gesualdo's life. Another Gesualdo opera was written by Franz Hummel in 1996. Salvatore Sciarrino arranged several of Gesualdo's madrigals for an instrumental ensemble.

=== Music based on Gesualdo's life and music ===
Operas based on Gesualdo's life and music:

- Maria di Venosa (1992) by Francesco d'Avalos.
- Gesualdo (1993) by Alfred Schnittke.
- Gesualdo (1998) by Franz Hummel.
- The Prince of Venosa (1998) by Scott Glasgow.
- Luci mie traditrici (1998) by Salvatore Sciarrino
- Gesualdo (2003) by Bo Holten.
- Gesualdo (2010) by Marc-André Dalbavie, lyrics by Richard Millet.

Other music inspired by Gesualdo or his music includes:

- Monumentum pro Gesualdo (1960) by Igor Stravinsky
- Omaggio a Gesualdo (1971) per violino e sei gruppi strumentali, by Jan van Vlijmen
- Tenebrae Super Gesualdo (1972) for Alto Flute, Bass Clarinet, Cello, Glockenspiel, Guitar, Harpsichord, Marimba, Mezzo-Soprano, Viola, Violin and Celeste by Peter Maxwell Davies
- Italian singer-songwriter Franco Battiato wrote and recorded the song "Gesualdo da Venosa" about him, for his 1995 album L'ombrello e la macchina da cucire. The song was remastered in 2008.
- In 1997, Australian composer Brett Dean paid homage to Gesualdo in Carlo, a work for string orchestra, tape and sampler.
- Tenebre (1997) for String Orchestra by Scott Glasgow
- Le voci sottovetro: Elaborazioni da Carlo Gesualdo da Venosa (1998) for voice and ensemble by Salvatore Sciarrino
- In 1998 Italian jazz arranger and composer Corrado Guarino, of Bergamo, in collaboration with Livorno saxophonist Tino Tracanna, released the CD Gesualdo. The work featured arrangements from books I, IV and VI of the Madrigals.
- La terribile e spaventosa storia del Principe di Venosa e della bella Maria (1999) music for l'Opera dei Pupi for voice and ensemble by Salvatore Sciarrino
- Sulla morte e la follia (2004) for Violin, Violoncello and Piano by Sergio Blardony
- Tenebrae (2008) by John Pickard
- Mexican/British composer Hilda Paredes has arranged three madrigals from Book Six for countertenor and string quartet: "Belta, poi che t'assenti", "Arditta zanzaretta" and "Moro lasso", published by University of York Music Press, were premiered in Tokyo at the Ishibiashi Memorial Hall by countertenor Jake Arditti and the Arditti String Quartet in 2012. The quartet have continued to perform them since.
- Night of Your Ascension (2015), album by experimental music collective Wrekmeister Harmonies.
- The Prince of Venosa - for string quartet (2016) by Caio Facó
- The Second Violinist (2017), an opera composed by Donnacha Dennehy, written and directed by Enda Walsh, in which the central character is in love with the music of Carlo Gesualdo, and with a plot that echoes his life. The score is influenced by part of Gesualdo’s motet Tristis anima mea.

=== Legacy ===
The Conservatorio di Musica Carlo Gesualdo da Venosa ([State] Conservatory of Music Carlo Gesualdo do Venoza), Potenza, in the region of Basilicata, Italy, was founded in 1971 and named for the composer.

In The Doors of Perception (1954), Aldous Huxley writes of Gesualdo's madrigals:

Mozart's C-Minor Piano Concerto was interrupted after the first movement, and a recording of some madrigals by Gesualdo took its place.

'These voices' I said appreciatively, 'these voices – they're a kind of bridge back to the human world.'

And a bridge they remained even while singing the most startlingly chromatic of the mad prince's compositions. Through the uneven phrases of the madrigals, the music pursued its course, never sticking to the same key for two bars together. In Gesualdo, that fantastic character out of a Webster melodrama, psychological disintegration had exaggerated, had pushed to the extreme limit, a tendency inherent in modal as opposed to fully tonal music. The resulting works sounded as though they might have been written by the later Schoenberg.

'And yet,' I felt myself constrained to say, as I listened to these strange products of a Counter-reformation psychosis working upon a late medieval art form, 'and yet it does not matter that he's all in bits. The whole is disorganized. But each individual fragment is in order, is a representative of a Higher Order. The Highest Order prevails even in the disintegration. The totality is present even in the broken pieces. More clearly present, perhaps, than in a completely coherent work. At least you aren't lulled into a sense of false security by some merely human, merely fabricated order. You have to rely on your immediate perception of the ultimate order. So in a certain sense disintegration may have its advantages. But of course it's dangerous, horribly dangerous. Suppose you couldn't get back, out of the chaos...'

David Pownall's play Music to Murder By (1976) juxtaposes the life of Gesualdo with that of twentieth-century composer Peter Warlock. In 1985, the French writer Michel Breitman published the novel Le Témoin de poussière based on the latter part of the life of Gesualdo. In 1995, Werner Herzog directed the film Gesualdo: Death for Five Voices about the life and music of Gesualdo.

In the NME, musician Anna Calvi named Gesualdo as one of her ultimate cult heroes:

Gesualdo was an Italian composer who, because of mental illness, murdered his wife and her lover, and wrote music in the 16th century that was so progressive and extreme that no one attempted to recreate his style until the 20th century... It wasn't until centuries later that he was rediscovered, and his work is a huge inspiration to me.

Gesualdo's name is used by The Gesualdo Six, a British vocal consort, directed by Owain Park. The group was founded in Cambridge in 2014 for a performance of the Tenebrae Responsories for Maundy Thursday in Trinity College Chapel, Cambridge. The group perform a broad-ranging repertoire, from the music of the medieval period through to contemporary compositions of the present day.

== Score editions ==
- Carlo Gesualdo: Madrigali a cinque voci (Libro Quinto – Libro Sesto), Edizione critica a cura di Maria Caraci Vela e Antonio Delfino, testi poetici a cura di Nicola Panizza, con uno scritto di Francesco Saggio, prefazione di Giuseppe Mastrominico, La Stamperia del Principe Gesualdo, Gesualdo, 2013. ISBN 978-88-906830-2-2

== Recordings ==
Gesualdo's madrigals and his Tenebrae Responsoria are often recorded.

=== Madrigals ===
- Gesualdo, Madrigaux. Les Arts Florissants: Harmonia Mundi France CD 901268 (selection from madrigal books 4–6)
- Gesualdo, Complete Sacred Music for Five Voices. Oxford Camerata, Jeremy Summerly: Naxos 8.550742
- Gesualdo, Madrigali Libri I-III. Gesualdo Consort Amsterdam: CPO 777 138–2
- Carlo Gesualdo de Verona, "The Complete Madrigals" [Libri I-VI]. 7 discs. Marco Longhini & Delitiæ Musicæ. Naxos 8507013.
- Gesualdo, "Madrigali a 5 voci" Books 1-6 [Complete] 6 discs. Quintetto Vocale Italiano Newton Classics 8802136
- Gesualdo, Madrigali, Libro I. The Kassiopeia Quintet: GLO5221 (only complete edition of Gesualdo's madrigals currently available)
- Gesualdo, Madrigali, Libro II. The Kassiopeia Quintet: GLO5222
- Gesualdo, Madrigali, Libro III. The Kassiopeia Quintet: GLO5223
- Gesualdo, Madrigali, Libro IV. The Kassiopeia Quintet: GLO5224
- Gesualdo, Madrigali, Libro V. The Kassiopeia Quintet: GLO5225
- Gesualdo, Madrigali, Libro VI. The Kassiopeia Quintet: GLO5226
- Gesualdo, Quarto Libro di Madrigali. La Venexiana: Glossa GCD920934
- Gesualdo, Quinto Libro di Madrigali. La Venexiana: Glossa GCD920935
- Gesualdo, Quinto Libro di Madrigali. The Hilliard Ensemble: ECM New Series. ECM 2175 476 4755
- Gesualdo, Quinto Libro di Madrigali. The Consort of Musicke, Anthony Rooley. L'Oiseau-Lyre 475 9110 DM
- Gesualdo, Sesto Libro di Madrigali. IL Complesso Barocco: Symphonia SY94133 (deleted), now Pan Classics PC10229
- Gesualdo, Sesto Libro di Madrigali. La Compagnia del Madrigale: Glossa GCD922801

=== Other ===
- Il cembalo intorno a Gesualdo, Paola Erdas (harpsichord)
- Gesualdo, Sacrae Cantiones Liber Secundus. Vocalconsort Berlin, James Wood: HMC 902123

== Sources ==
- Arnold, Denis; et al. (1984). Italian Baroque Masters: Monteverdi, Frescobaldi, Cavalli, Corelli, A. Scarlatti, Vivaldi, D. Scarlatti. The New Grove. Macmillan. ISBN 9780333382356.
- Bianconi, Lorenzo (2001). "Gesualdo, Carlo, Prince of Venosa, Count of Conza". Grove Music Online (8th ed.). Oxford University Press. doi:10.1093/gmo/9781561592630.article.10994. ISBN 978-1-56159-263-0. (subscription, Wikilibrary access, or UK public library membership required)
- Brown, Howard Mayer; Stein, Louise K. (1999). Music in the Renaissance. History of Music. Prentice Hall. ISBN 9780134000459.
- Gray, Cecil; Warlock, Peter (1926). Carlo Gesualdo, Prince of Venosa: Musician and Murderer. London: Kegan Paul, Trench, Trubner & Co. Ltd.
- Mann, Brian (2002). The Madrigals of Michelangelo Rossi. Monuments of Renaissance Music. Vol. 10. University of Chicago Press. ISBN 9780226503387.
- Mullenger, Len (1998). "Don Carlo Gesualdo, Prince of Venosa, Count of Conza". MusicWeb International.
- Newcomb, Anthony (October 1968). "Carlo Gesualdo and a Musical Correspondence of 1594". The Musical Quarterly. 54 (4). Oxford University Press: 409–436. doi:10.1093/mq/LIV.4.409. JSTOR 741067.
- Ober, William B. (July 1973). "Carlo Gesualdo, Prince of Venosa: Murder, Madrigals, and Masochism". Bulletin of the New York Academy of Medicine. 49 (7). New York Academy of Medicine: 634–645. PMC 1807043. PMID 4575970.
- Roberts, Nicholas (2013). "Variations on a Theme: Scored Music and Language in Julio Cortázar's 'Clone'" (PDF). Bulletin of Spanish Studies. 90 (6). Durham University: 1011–1034. doi:10.1080/14753820.2013.810920. S2CID 53021224.
- Ross, Alex (12 December 2011). "Prince of Darkness: The Murders and Madrigals of Don Carlo Gesualdo". The New Yorker. A Critic at Large.
- Sadie, Stanley, ed. (1980). "Carlo Gesualdo". The New Grove Dictionary of Music and Musicians (1st ed.). London: Macmillan.
- Watkins, Glenn (1991). Gesualdo: The Man and His Music. Preface by Igor Stravinsky (2nd ed.). Clarendon Press. ISBN 9780198162162.
- Watkins, Glenn (2010). The Gesualdo Hex: Music, Myth, and Memory. Preface by Claudio Abbado. New York: W. W. Norton & Company. ISBN 9780393071023.
