= Caio Facó =

Brazilian composer

- Born: May 16, 1992 (age 33)
- Origin: Fortaleza, Brazil
- Genres: Contemporary Classical Music
- Occupation: Composer
- Website: https://caiofaco.com/

Caio Facó (born May 16, 1992) is a Brazilian composer.

== Biography ==
Caio Facó was born in Fortaleza, Brazil. He studied musical composition under the guidance of Alfredo Barros, Germán Gras, and Borges-Cunha and garnered numerous international accolades during his twenties. In 2017, Facó worked as a Composer in Residence for Ensemble MPMP, in Portugal. From 2017 to 2019, he was a Guest Composer from Orquesta de Cámara de Valdivia, in Chile. Facó also collaborated with the International Contemporary Ensemble (USA), Mivos Quartet (USA) and Orquestra Metropolitana de Lisboa (Portugal). For three consecutive years (2016–18), he won the most prestigious composition contest in Brazil: Festival Tinta Fresca. In Brazil, his works are performed by Orquestra Sinfônica do Estado de São Paulo and Orquestra Filarmônica de Minas Gerais. In 2021, Facó was a Composer in Residence at Orquestra Sinfônica do Estado de São Paulo. In 2024, he was selected for a residency at Ibermúsicas, to work on two new chamber works in Portugal. Facó's work has been associated with anti-colonialism movements and issues from the Global South. His artistic research extends to fostering the dialogue between Eastern and Western cultures. He currently works as a Professor of Music at Bahrain Polytechnic University, in the Middle East.

== Selected works ==
=== Chamber orchestra ===
- Diário das Narrativas Fantásticas (2019)
- As veias abertas da América Latina (2018)

=== Large orchestra ===
- O pássaro de areia (2023)
- O tear das histórias do Sol (2022)
- Ensaio sobre Cores e Sombras (2018)
- Pandora (2017)
- Aproximações Áureas (2016)

=== Chamber music ===
- Livro dos Luminares (2024)
- Discurso das Poesias (2023)
- Goldberg – Diálogos entre duas Eras (2021)
- O lugar de todas as coisas (2021)
- Cangaceiros e Fanáticos (2018)
- Reminiscências (2017)
- Sopros do Estuário (2017)
- Ritos das Senhoras da Terra (2017)
- As Vozes das Labaredas do Sertão (2017)
- O Príncipe de Venosa (2016)
- Canções Errantes (2016)
