= Concerted madrigal =

Madrigal music style

Concerted madrigal is a madrigal music style in which any number of voices combine with instruments, whether just basso continuo or basso continuo and others. The development of this style was one of the defining features of the beginning of the Baroque musical era.

An example of this is Claudio Monteverdi's Zefiro torna e di soavi accenti.
