= Glenn Watkins =

American musicologist (1927–2021)

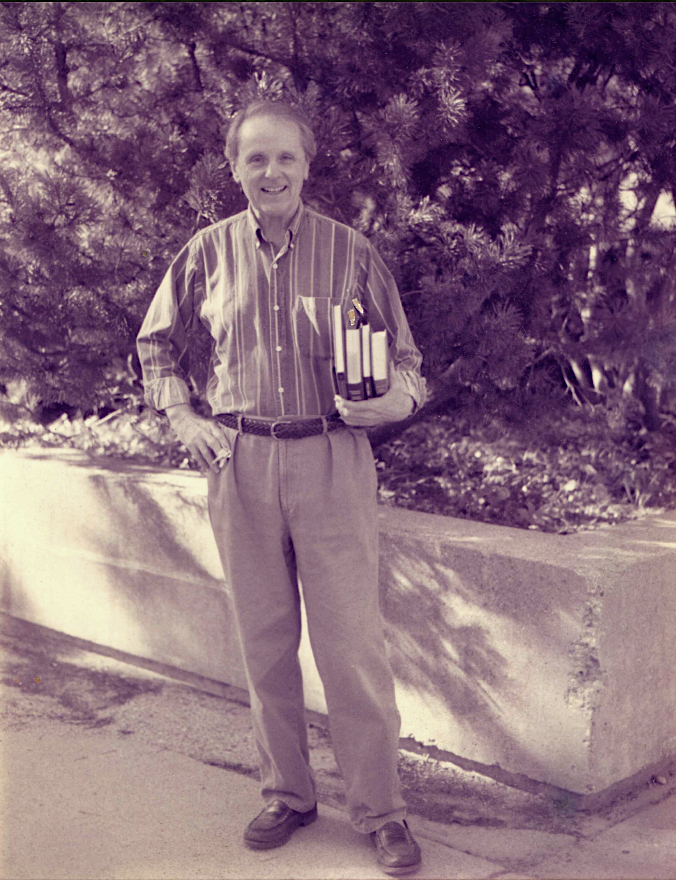
- Watkins in 1993
- Born: May 30, 1927; McPherson, Kansas
- Died: June 19, 2021 (age 94); Ann Arbor, Michigan
- Education: University of Rochester (Ph.D., 1953); University of Michigan
- Known for: Study of Renaissance and twentieth-century European art music.
- Awards: Premio Internazionale Carlo Gesualdo, Honorary Member of the American Musicological Society
- Scientific career
- Fields: Musicology
- Workplaces: University of Michigan
- Website: Faculty profile

Glenn E. Watkins (May 30, 1927 – June 19, 2021), was the Earl V. Moore Professor (Emeritus) of Music History and Musicology at the University of Michigan and a specialist in the study of Renaissance and 20th-century music.

== Biography ==
Born in McPherson, Kansas, Watkins served in the United States Army from 1944–46. During this period he was enrolled in the ASTP engineering program at the University of Oklahoma, the Japanese language programs at the University of Pennsylvania and the University of Minnesota, and was later stationed in Tokyo with the "Allied Translator and Interpreter Section" of MacArthur's General Headquarters. Immediately after the war in 1947 he briefly attended North Texas State University where his first organ teacher, Helen Hewitt, directed him to the field of musicology.

He received a B.A. (1948) and M.Mus. (1949) from the University of Michigan, and a Ph.D. from the Eastman School of Music, University of Rochester, in 1953. Watkins was the recipient of a Fulbright scholarship at London and Oxford, 1953–54. He studied organ with Jean Langlais in Paris in 1956 and analysis and organ at Fontainebleau with Nadia Boulanger, who commissioned him to play the Poulenc Organ Concerto for the composer. His teaching career began at Southern Illinois University from 1954–58, and continued at University of North Carolina, Chapel Hill, 1958–63. In 1963 he moved to the University of Michigan, where he taught until retiring in 1996.

== Awards ==
In addition to the Fulbright Award, Watkins received an American Council of Learned Societies Grant, and fellowships from the National Endowment for the Humanities and the University of Michigan Institute for the Humanities. He has published numerous articles, reviews and editions, and is co-editor of the complete works of Gesualdo. His critical study of that composer, Gesualdo: The Man and His Music (1973), which carries a Preface by Igor Stravinsky, was a 1974 National Book Award nominee. It was translated into Hungarian in 1980 and into German in 2000, and a second revised English edition was published in 1990. In 2005, he was awarded the Premio Internazionale Carlo Gesualdo and was elected as an Honorary Member of the American Musicological Society.

== Work ==
Watkins's editions of the works of Sigismondo d'India and Carlo Gesualdo have been recorded by numerous international groups, including the Deller Consort, the Consort of Musicke, the Tallis Scholars, La Venexiana, The Kassiopeia Quintet, and Les Arts Florissants. His text Soundings (1988) offers a synthetic overview of music in the 20th century, and his book Pyramids at the Louvre (1994) argues the idea of collage as a foundation for musical Modernism and a catalyst for the rise of Postmodernism. Watkins’s book, Proof Through the Night: Music and the Great War (2003), investigates the variable roles of music during World War I primarily from the angle of the Entente nations’ perceived threat of German hegemony. His most recent work, The Gesualdo Hex (2010) traces not only the recognition accorded to a Renaissance prince from his own time to the early twenty-first century but places it within the context of ongoing historiographic debates and controversies.

Watkins lectured widely in America for universities, orchestras and art organizations, and his interest in both late Renaissance and 20th-century studies was reflected in numerous invited papers for international conferences as well as in projects for Columbia, Nonesuch, Pye, Éditions de l'Oiseau-Lyre, Harmonia Mundi, Glossa, and Deutsche Grammophon records and for BBC, German, and Italian television.

== Books ==
- Watkins, Glenn (1991) [1974]. Gesualdo: The Man and His Music (2nd ed.). Oxford. ISBN 0-19-816197-2.
- Soundings: Music in the Twentieth Century, 1988, 1995. ISBN 0-02-873290-1
- Pyramids at the Louvre. Music, Culture, and Collage from Stravinsky to the Postmodernists, 1994. ISBN 978-0-674-74083-9
- Proof through the Night: Music and the Great War, 2002. ISBN 0-520-23158-9
- The Gesualdo Hex, 2010. ISBN 978-0-393-07102-3
