= Antonio Spagnolo =

Italian motorsport engineer

- Years active: 2004 - 2019
- Known for: Formula One race engineer

Antonio Spagnolo is an Italian Formula One and motorsport engineer. He has previously served in senior engineering roles for Scuderia Ferrari and Williams Racing.

== Career ==
Spagnolo studied mechanical engineering in Italy, completing a master’s degree at the Università degli Studi di Trieste between 1997 and 2002, followed by a postgraduate master’s degree in vehicle engineering at the Università degli Studi di Modena e Reggio Emilia in 2002–2003.

He began his professional motorsport career in 2004 with Minardi as a CAE and performance engineer. In 2005, Spagnolo joined Scuderia Ferrari’s Formula One programme, initially working with the test team as a performance engineer. In 2009, he was assigned as performance engineer to Kimi Räikkönen, and in 2010 took on the same role for Fernando Alonso, a position he held through the end of the 2013 season. In 2014, Spagnolo became Räikkönen’s race engineer following the Finn’s return to Ferrari, but the partnership ended after one season amid communication difficulties. From 2015 to 2016, he was appointed Head of the Tyre Performance Group, leading Ferrari’s tyre analysis and competitor benchmarking during a period of significant regulatory and compound changes.

In 2016, Spagnolo joined Williams Racing as Tyre Group and Competitor Analysis Performance Leader, where he worked on tyre modelling and race simulation, at both the factory and trackside level. He left the team in 2019 and has since taken up a range of engineering consultancy roles including at the Formula One Group.
