= Tristis est anima mea =

Tristis est anima mea (Sad is my soul) is the Latin phrase with which Matthew 26:38 starts. It is Tristis est anima mea (responsory), the second responsory of the Tenebrae for Maundy Thursday which was often set to music. It may also refer to:

- Movement XI of Christus (Liszt), an oratorium by Franz Liszt
- Heu me, tristis est anima mea, attributed to Philippe de Vitry
- Second part of Parasceve Suite by György Deák-Bárdos
- Third of Quatre motets pour un temps de pénitence by Francis Poulenc
- Tristis est anima mea (attributed to Kuhnau), motet attributed to Johann Kuhnau
- Tristis est anima mea (Corsi), responsory, TriC 26ad, by Giuseppe Corsi da Celano
- Tristis est anima mea (de Cristo) by Pedro de Cristo
- Tristis est anima mea (Gesualdo), Tenebrae Responsoria No. 2 by Carlo Gesualdo (1611)
- Tristis est anima mea (Heinichen), responsory in F major, Seibel 104, by Johann David Heinichen
- Tristis est anima mea (Lassus), motet by Orlande de Lassus, No. 1 in the Drexel 4302 manuscript
- Tristis est anima mea (Nenna), motet (responsory) by Pomponio Nenna
- Tristis est anima mea (Perosi), motet by Lorenzo Perosi
- Tristis est anima mea (Robert) by Pierre Robert
- No. 2 of Responsoria pro hebdomada sancta, ZWV 55, by Jan Dismas Zelenka
