= List of compositions by Giuseppe Corsi =

The compositions by Giuseppe Corsi are listed in Catalogo della produzione musicale di Giuseppe Corsi, also abbreviated as TriCo, published by Giovanni Tribuzio in 2014 (Florestano Edizioni). The catalog is organized thematically and contains 83 works between authentic and attributed.

== Sacred Vocal Music ==
=== Masses ===
- TriCo 1: Mass for four voices;
- TriCo 2: Mass for eight voices [La Luna Piena or Divo Juvenali];
- TriCo 3: Mass for ten voices.

=== Parts of mass, motets and other compositions ===
- TriCo 4: Credo;
- TriCo 5: Requiem mass;
- TriCo 6: Cantate Domino;
- TriCo 7: Exaudi Domine;
- TriCo 8: Dum medium silentium;
- TriCo 9: Caro mea;
- TriCo 10: Domine Deus;
- TriCo 11: Ego sum Pastor Bonus;
- TriCo 12: O dulcissime Jesu.

=== Canticles ===
- TriCo 13: Benedictus.

=== Psalms ===
- TriCo 14: Miserere [psalm 50];
- TriCo 15: Miserere [psalm 50];
- TriCo 16: Miserere for Ferdinando de' Medici [psalm 50];
- TriCo 17: Dixit Dominus [psalm 109];
- TriCo 18: Laudate pueri [psalm 113];
- TriCo 19: Nisi Dominus [psalm 126];
- TriCo 20: De profundis [psalm 129].

=== Antiphons ===
- TriCo 21: Omnes sancti;
- TriCo 22: O quam suavis est Domine;
- TriCo 23: Stella coeli.

=== Hymns ===
- TriCo 24: Tantum ergo sacramentum.

=== Responsories ===
- TriCo 25: 27 responsories for Ferdinando de' Medici;
- TriCo 26: Responsoria Hebdomadae Sanctae;
  - TriCo 26a: Aestimatus sum;
  - TriCo 26b: Amicus meus;
  - TriCo 26c: Animam meam;
  - TriCo 26d: Animam meam;
  - TriCo 26e: Astiterunt reges;
  - TriCo 26f: Caligaverunt oculi mei;
  - TriCo 26g: Caligaverunt oculi mei;
  - TriCo 26h: Ecce quomodo moritur justus;
  - TriCo 26i: Ecce quomodo moritur justus;
  - TriCo 26j: Ecce vidimus eum;
  - TriCo 26k: Ecce vidimus eum;
  - TriCo 26l: Eram quasi agnus;
  - TriCo 26m: In monte Oliveti;
  - TriCo 26n: Jerusalum surge;
  - TriCo 26o: Jesus tradidit;
  - TriCo 26p: Judas mercator;
  - TriCo 26q: O vos omnes;
  - TriCo 26r: Omnes amici mei;
  - TriCo 26s: Plange quasi virgo;
  - TriCo 26t: Plange quasi virgo;
  - TriCo 26u: Recessit Pastor noster;
  - TriCo 26v: Seniores populi;
  - TriCo 26w: Seniores populi;
  - TriCo 26x: Sepulto Domino;
  - TriCo 26y: Sepulto Domino;
  - TriCo 26z: Sicut ovis;
  - TriCo 26aa: Tamquam ad latronem;
  - TriCo 26ab: Tenebrae factae sunt;
  - TriCo 26ac: Tradiderunt me;
  - TriCo 26ad: Tristis est anima mea;
  - TriCo 26ae: Una hora;
  - TriCo 26af: Unus ex discipulis;
  - TriCo 26ag: Unus ex discipulis;
  - TriCo 26ah: Velum templi;
  - TriCo 26ai: Vinea mea electa;
  - TriCo 26aj: Vinea mea electa.

=== Litanies ===
- TriCo 27: Litanie à 9 concertate;

=== Motets ===
- TriCo 28: Adoramus te Christe;
- TriCo 29: Benedicam Dominum;
- TriCo 30: Christum regem adoremus;
- TriCo 31: Domine libera animam;
- TriCo 32: Exultet terra;
- TriCo 33: Heu nos miseros (falsely attributed to Leonardo Leo);
- TriCo 34: Isti sunt qui venerunt;
- TriCo 35: Judica mihi;
- TriCo 36: Lumen pacis ortum est;
- TriCo 37: O quam bonus est Dominus;
- TriCo 38: Panem de coelo praestitisti eis;
- TriCo 39: Revertere;
- TriCo 40: Venite comedite.

=== Oratorios ===
- TriCo 41: Ismaele e Agar esigliati dalla Casa di Abramo;
- TriCo 42: Latin oratorio;
- TriCo 43: Latin oratorio for nine voices (Benedictio Iacob, TriCo 73);
- TriCo 44: Santi Alessandro et Antonina martiri.

=== Sacred cantatas ===
- TriCo 45: Non ha limiti né mete (aria in TriCo 41);
- TriCo 46: Passati contenti;
- TriCo 47: Pastori ove siete?;
- TriCo 48: 3 sacred cantatas with instruments for Ranuccio II Farnese for the Holy Week of 1688.

== Secular Vocal Music ==
=== Ariettas and cantatas for one voice and b.c. ===
- TriCo 49: Abbandonato e solo [Il Nerone];
- TriCo 50: Ardo ma l'ardor mio;
- TriCo 51: Belle aurette che spiegate;
- TriCo 52: Che goder non si dan gioie;
- TriCo 53: Ch'io canti una canzona;
- TriCo 54: Chi desia veder un core;
- TriCo 55: Cieli non più;
- TriCo 56: Con chi l'havete;
- TriCo 57: Cruda legge del mio fato;
- TriCo 58: Dalle balze sicane [Encelado];
- TriCo 59: È superba ed insolente;
- TriCo 60: Era la notte e lo stellato cielo [La stravaganza];
- TriCo 61: Fuggian l'ombre del suol;
- TriCo 62: L'addolorato Eurillo;
- TriCo 63a: Me lo volete dire (for bass);
- TriCo 63b-d: Me lo volete dire (for soprano);
- TriCo 64: Nel meglio del gioire [Il delirio];
- TriCo 65: Qual dedalo d'affanni;
- TriCo 66: S'era alquanto addormentato [Inquietudine amorosa];
- TriCo 67: Son disperato, ohimè;
- TriCo 68: T'amai, crudele è vero;
- TriCo 69: Voglio amar chi piace a me.

=== Cantatas for two voices and b.c. ===
- TriCo 70: Guerra, o pensier, all'armi.

=== Cantatas for three voices and b.c. ===
- TriCo 71: Chi ama non speri.

== Attributed Works ==
=== Sacred music ===
- TriCo 72: Sequence Stabat Mater;
- TriCo 73: Oratorio Benedictio Iacob;
- TriCo 74: Oratorio Santa Teodora;

=== Secular Vocal Music ===
- TriCo 75: 2 madrigali per Ferdinando de' Medici;
- TriCo 76: 2 cantate per Ferdinando de' Medici.

== Spurious Works ==
=== Sacred music ===
- TriCo 77: Responsory Caligaverunt oculi mei (by Giacomo Antonio Perti);
- TriCo 78: Motet Adjuva nos Deus (by Giovanni Battista Casali);
- TriCo 79: Motet Christum regem adoremus (by Giovanni Battista Casali or Pietro Paolo Bencini);
- TriCo 80: Sacred cantata Del famoso oriente [La madre ebrea] (by Antonio Cesti).

=== Secular vocal music ===
- TriCo 81: Cantata S'inganna il mio pensier (by Giovanni Salvatore or Domenico Salvatore);
- TriCo 82: Aria Vorrei spiegarti o cara (by Pasquale Cafaro);
- TriCo 83: AriaVuoi saper l'affanno mio (by Pasquale Cafaro).
