= Tristis est anima mea (responsory) =

Christian liturgical chant for Maundy Thursday

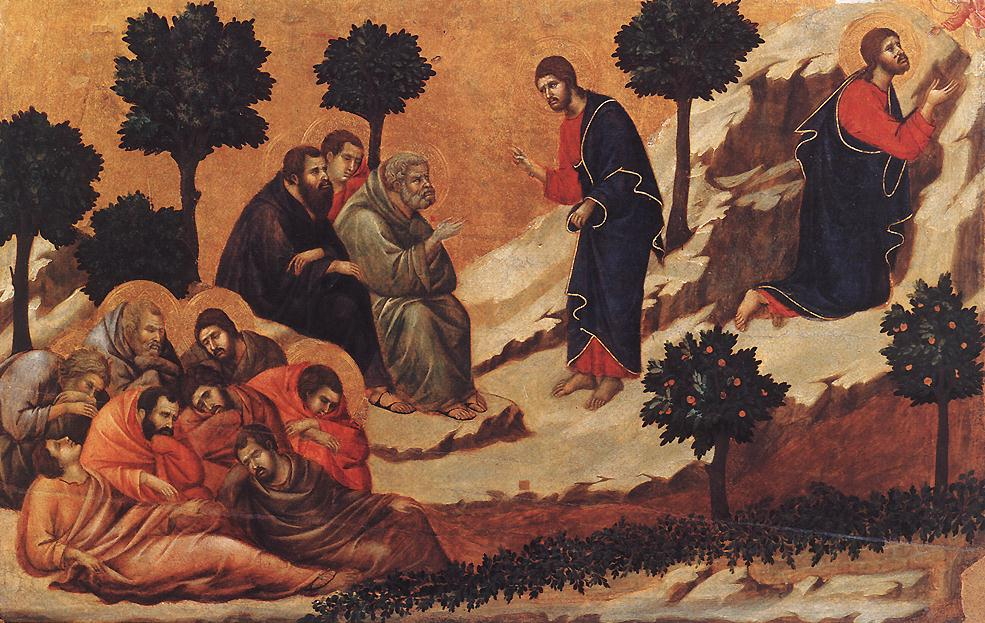
Agony in the Garden by Duccio di Buoninsegna (early 14th century)

Tristis est anima mea is the second responsory of the Tenebrae for Maundy Thursday. The Latin text refers to Christ's Agony in the Garden of Gethsemane, a part of his Passion.

== Text ==
The theme of the text of the second responsory for Maundy Thursday is Jesus in the garden Gethsemane, addressing his disciples.

The first two lines of the responsory are Matthew 26:38. In the King James Version, the beginning of the Latin text, told in the first person, is translated as "My soul is exceeding sorrowful".

While the first two lines are quoted from the bible, the last two lines of are free anonymous poetry, predicting they will see a crowd, they will flee, and Jesus will go to be sacrificed for them.

Responsorium:

Tristis est anima mea usque ad mortem :
sustinete hic, et vigilate mecum :
nunc videbitis turbam, quæ circumdabit me.
Vos fugam capietis, et ego vadam immolari pro vobis.

Versus:

Ecce appropinquat hora, et Filius hominis tradetur in manus peccatorum.
Vos fugam capietis, et ego vadam immolari pro vobis.

Translations are offered by the Episcopal Church and the Roman Catholic Church:

Responsorium:

My soul is sorrowful even unto death;
stay you here, and watch with me.
Now ye shall see a multitude, that will surround me.
Ye shall run away, and I will go to be sacrificed for you.

Versus:

Behold the hour is at hand, and the Son of Man shall be betrayed into the hands of sinners.
Ye shall run away, and I will go to be sacrificed for you.

== Settings ==
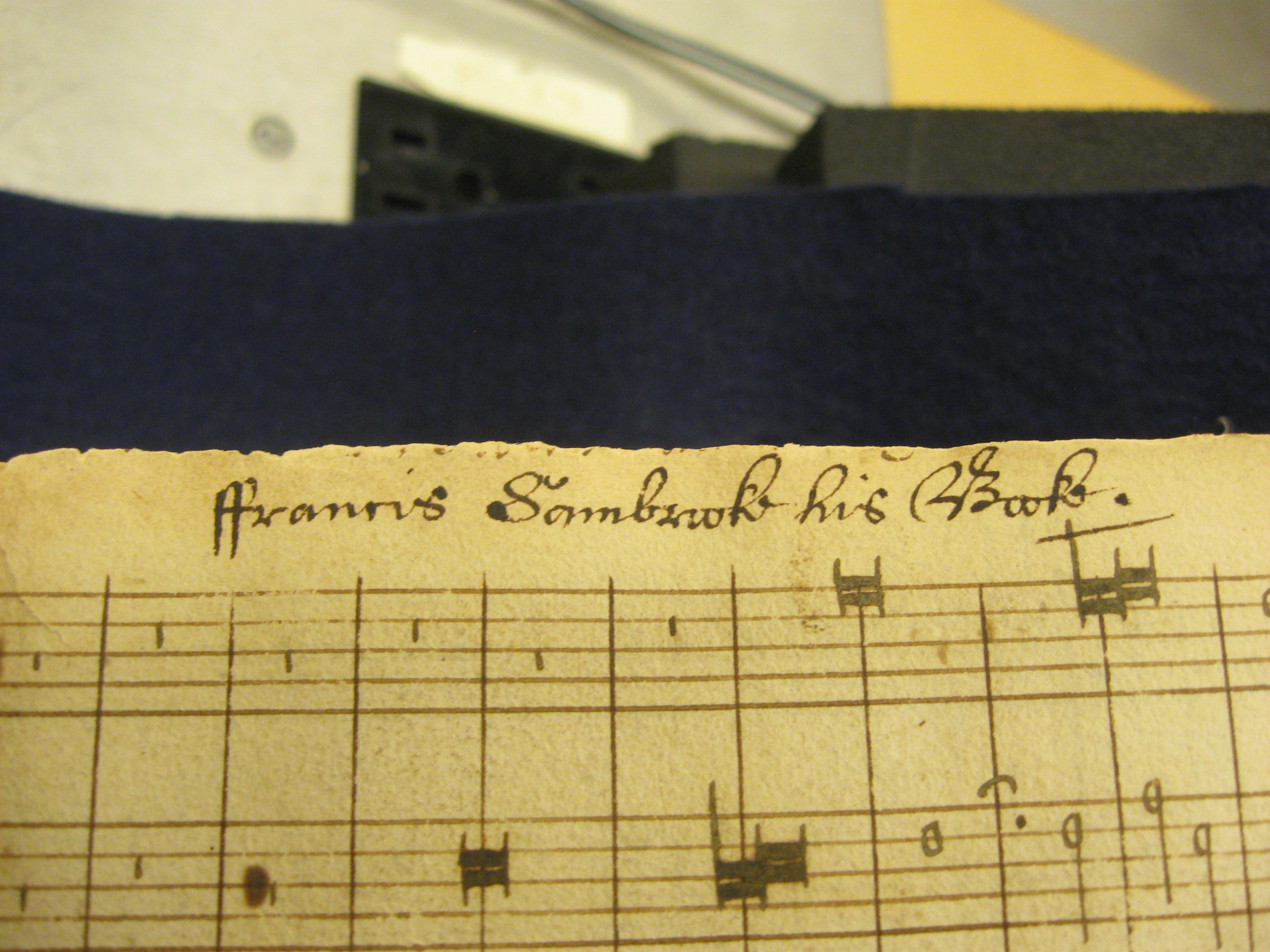
First notes sung by soprano and (first) alto of Lassus' Tristis est anima mea, No. 1 in Drexel 4302

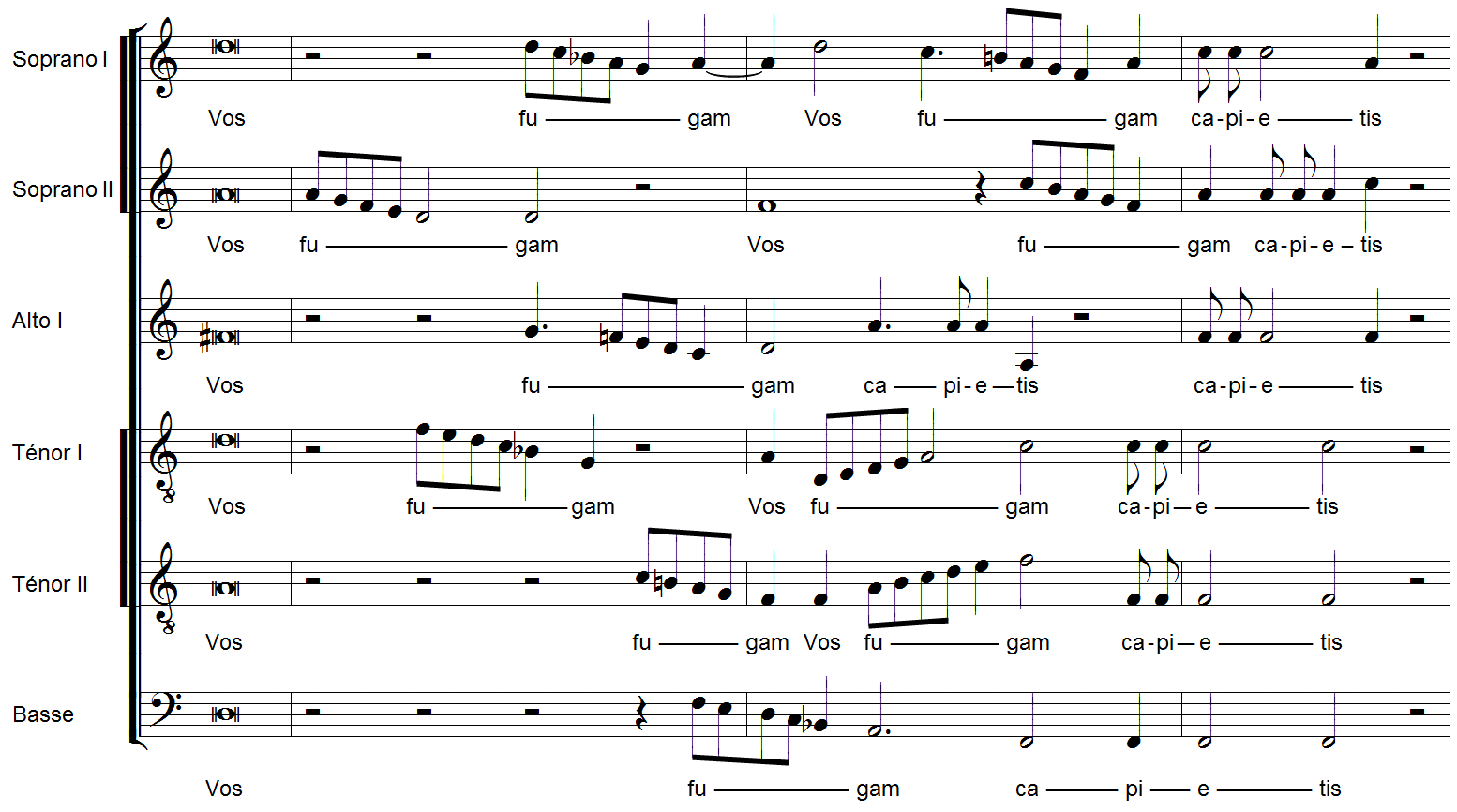
Extract of Gesualdo's setting of Tristis est anima mea (1611)

Motets and other musical settings based on the responsory:

- A motet by Orlando di Lasso, for instance included as No. 1 in the Drexel 4302 manuscript
- A motet by Pomponio Nenna included in Sacrae Hebdomadae Responsoria (posthumously published in 1622)
- Méditation No.3 in "Méditations pour le Carême, H.380-389" by Marc-Antoine Charpentier
- A setting included in Officium Hebdomadae Sanctae (1585) by Tomás Luis de Victoria
- A 1611 responsory by Carlo Gesualdo: "... begins with desolate, drooping figures that conjure Jesus’ prayer in Gethsemane ... It then accelerates into frenzied motion, suggesting the fury of the mob and the flight of Jesus’ disciples. There follows music of profound loneliness, radiant chords punctured by aching dissonances, as Jesus says, “I will go to be sacrificed for you.”"
- A setting by Pedro de Cristo
- TriC 26ad, a responsory by Giuseppe Corsi da Celano
- A setting by Pierre Robert
- A SSATB motet attributed to Johann Kuhnau
- A responsory in F major (Seibel 104) by Johann David Heinichen
- No. 2 of Responsoria pro hebdomada sancta, ZWV 55, by Jan Dismas Zelenka
- A motet by Lorenzo Perosi
- Fourth of Quatre motets pour un temps de pénitence by Francis Poulenc
- The opening movement of Part III (eleventh movement overall) of Franz Liszt's oratorio Christus
- An a cappella choir piece (SATB) by Henk Badings Latin text
