= Francesco Manfredini =

Italian composer

Francesco Onofrio Manfredini
- Born: 22 June 1684; Pistoia
- Died: 6 October 1762 (aged 78); Pistoia
- Occupation: Composer

Francesco Onofrio Manfredini (22 June 1684 – 6 October 1762) was an Italian Baroque composer, violinist, and church musician.

He was born in Pistoia to a trombonist. In Bologna, then a part of the Papal States, he studied violin with Giuseppe Torelli, a leading figure in the development of the concerto grosso. Manfredini also took instruction in composition from Giacomo Antonio Perti, maestro di cappella of the Basilica of San Petronio from 1696 when the orchestra was temporarily disbanded.

Much of his music is presumed to have been destroyed after his death; only 43 published works and a handful of manuscripts are known. To quote his Naxos biography, "His groups of Concerti Grossi and Sinfonias show a highly accomplished composer, well versed in the mainstream Italian school of composition".

== Career ==
Although he composed oratorios, only his secular works remain in the repertoire. A contemporary of Johann Sebastian Bach and Antonio Vivaldi, his extant work shows the influence of the latter.

He became a violinist, c. 1700, in the orchestra of the Chiesa di Santo Spirito in Ferrara. In 1704, however, he returned to Bologna, employed again in the re-formed orchestra of San Petronio. He became a member of the Accademia Filarmonica in the same year that he published his first compositions, a set of twelve chamber sonatas that he named Concertini per camera, Op. 1. In 1709, he also published Sinfonie da chiesa, Op. 2; ostensibly chamber pieces, they, in fact, complemented the earlier chamber sonatas.

After 1711, Manfredini spent an extended stay in Monaco, apparently in the service of Prince Antoine I. The prince had been a pupil of Louis XIV's favourite composer Jean Baptiste Lully, whose conductor's baton he had inherited. The precise nature of his relationship to the court of Monaco and the length of his stay are not known. Manfredini was first mentioned in court records in 1712. In 1718, he published, in Bologna, his Concerti Grossi for two violins and basso continuo, Op. 3, Nos. 1–12, which is dedicated to that ruler. In addition, copies of his Sinfonie, Op. 2 were found in the princely library. One indication of the nature of the relationship is that Prince Antoine stood as godfather to Manfredini's son, Antonio Francesco; four other children were born to him during his stay in the principality.

Given even this slim evidence, it can be inferred that both parties were satisfied by the arrangement since the composer does not reappear in the historical records until the year 1727, when he had returned to Pistoia as maestro di cappella at St. Phillip's Cathedral, a post he would hold until his death in 1762.

The Naxos label has released a 1991 recording of the Opus 3 (catalogue number: 8.553891), recorded by the Slovakian Capella Istropolitana, conducted by Jaroslav Krček. The liner notes further suggest that his name "may have...disappeared had he not composed a Christmas Concerto (No. 12 of Op. 3).... [T]hese concerti grossi...demonstrate a gift for easy melodic invention."

Two of his sons, Vincenzo and Giuseppe, had careers of some note. The former was appointed maestro di cappella of the Italian opera in St. Petersburg. Giuseppe Manfredini (singer) became a castrato singer.

== Reputation ==
In the 1970s, Manfredini's name became emblematic of the run-of-the-mill Baroque composer, when musicologist H.C. Robbins Landon wrote an article titled "A Pox on Manfredini", which was intended to castigate record companies of the time for seeking to release material from even the most undistinguished composers of the Baroque era.

== Compositions ==
Francesco composed vocal works, though he is better known for his instrumental works, such as concertos and symphonies. He composed at least 9 oratorios, such as:

- San Filippo Neri trionfante (1719)
- Tomaso Moro (ou Tommaso Moro)(1720)
- Il fasto della castità
- L'esaltazione di Salomone
- Il sacrifizio di Gefte
- La profezia d'Eliseo
