= Ripieno concerto =

Baroque music genre

The ripieno concerto is a late Baroque music genre. The word ripieno is from the Italian for "padding," referring to the string orchestra and any wind or chord-playing instrumentalists who played no solo parts but would accompany the soloists in concerti and concerti grossi . The concerto ripieno was sometimes referred to as a "concerto a quattro" (or "a cinque" if the orchestra included two viola parts, a standard scoring in the 17th century) and was a composition for the ripieno alone (i.e. for string orchestra and continuo), with either no solo parts or clearly subsidiary ones. Beginning with the six ripieno concertos, Op. 5 (1692), of Giuseppe Torelli, this genre enjoyed an efflorescence that extended until about 1740.

== Types ==
Most ripieno concertos fall into one of two distinct classes: a sonata type and a sinfonia type. The sonata type generally mirrors the form and style of the sonata da chiesa in its use of four-movement slow–fast–slow–fast cycles and predominantly fugal texture.

The more modern sinfonia type was firmly established in Torelli's second publication to include concertos, Op. 6 (1698), and in Giulio Taglietti's Concerti a Quattro, Op. 4 (1699), which turn to the three-movement (fast-slow-fast) pattern and more homophonic texture familiar to us from the solo concerto and opera sinfonia. The opening movements also parallel the solo concerto in utilizing ritornello form (without solo sections), in which the opening material recurs from one to several times in various keys, the last statement normally in the tonic. Finales are most often binary in form and dancelike in style. The sinfonia type gradually merged with the early concert symphony beginning in the 1720s, doubtless in part because the term concerto was by that time acquiring an indelible association with the notion of tutti-solo contrast.

Concerto for Orchestra of the 20th century is not a ripieno concerto in the Baroque sense but rather a display piece in which the orchestra itself is the virtuoso, with soloists, to sections of the orchestra, to choirs, to tutti taking on and relinquishing the solo part or parts. Best known through Bartók's popular work of 1943, other examples include those by Hindemith (1925), Walter Piston (1933), Zoltán Kodály (1939–40), Michael Tippett (1962–63), and Elliott Carter (1969). In the last piece, Carter dramatically personifies or characterizes the various concertino groupings, a technique he had previously explored in his Double Concerto for harpsichord and piano (1961) and his Piano Concerto (1964–65).
