= Giuseppe Torelli =

Italian Baroque violinist and composer (1658–1709)

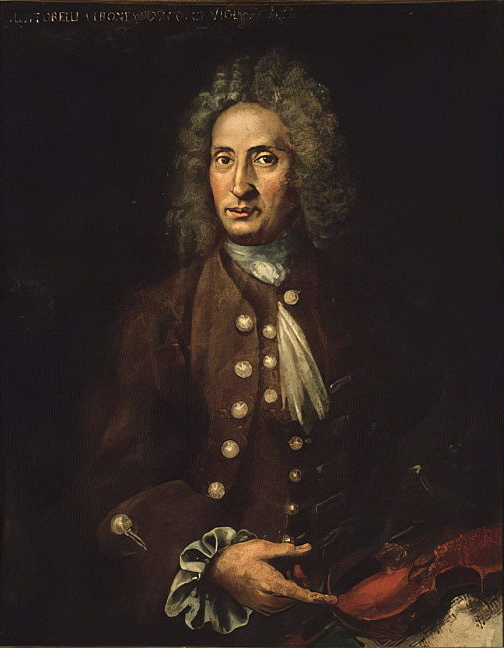
Giuseppe Torelli.

Giuseppe Torelli (22 April 1658 Verona – 8 February 1709) was an Italian violinist, teacher and composer of the middle Baroque era.

Brother of the painter Felice Torelli, he is most remembered for contributing to the development of the concerto, especially the solo concerto, and for his music for string instruments and trumpet.

== Life ==
Torelli was born in Verona. It is not known with whom he studied violin, although it has been speculated that he was a pupil of Leonardo Brugnoli or Bartolomeo Laurenti, but it is certain that he studied composition with Giacomo Antonio Perti. On 27 June 1684, at the age of 26, he became a member of the Accademia Filarmonica as suonatore di violino. He was employed as a viola player at the San Petronio basilica beginning in 1686, where he stayed until 1695 or January 1696, when the orchestra was discontinued because of financial constraints. In 1687 Giuseppe Corsi da Celano played Torelli's music, from Op. 3, in Parma at the Sanctuary of Santa Maria della Steccata. By 1698 Torelli was maestro di concerto at the court of Georg Friedrich II, Margrave of Brandenburg-Ansbach, where he conducted the orchestra for Le pazzie d'amore e dell'interesse, an idea drammatica composed by the maestro di cappella, and the castrato Francesco Antonio Pistocchi. Torelli left for Vienna in December 1699, returning to Bologna sometime before February 1701, when he is listed as a violinist in the newly re-formed cappella musicale at San Petronio, directed by his former composition teacher Perti.

Giuseppe Torelli died at the age of 50 on 8 February 1709 in Bologna, where his manuscripts are conserved in the San Petronio archives.

Giuseppe's brother, Felice Torelli, was a Bolognese painter of modest reputation, who went on to be a founding member of the Accademia Clementina. The most notable amongst Giuseppe's many pupils was Francesco Manfredini.

== Selected works ==
- 10 Sonate a 3, with basso continuo, Op. 1 (1686).
- 12 Concerto da camera, for 2 violins and basso continuo, Op. 2 (1686).
- 12 Sinfonie, for 2–4 instruments, Op. 3 (1687).
- 12 Concertino per camera for violin and cello, Op. 4 (1688).
- 12 Sinfonie a 3 e concerti a 4, Op. 5 (1692).
- 12 Concerti musicali a quattro, Op. 6 (1698).
- 12 Concerti grossi con una pastorale per il Santissimo Natale, Op. 8 (1709).
- More than 30 concertos for 1 to 4 trumpets, including a Sinfonia à 4, composed after 1702. and unpublished during his lifetime, which is a concerto for four trumpets, with an orchestra requiring a minimum of four oboes, two bassoons, trombone, timpani, four violins, two violas, four cellos, two double basses, and continuo.

== Selected recordings ==
- Cantata "Lumi dolenti lumi" on Agitata Delphine Galou, Accademia Bizantina, Ottavio Dantone, Alpha. 2017

== Sources ==
- Adler, Herman (1955). Giuseppe Torelli: Trumpet Concerto in D Major (LP record). Jean-Francois Paillard Chamber Orchestra. Musical Heritage Society. MHS 595.
- Ciliberti, Galliano, and Giovanni Tribuzio. 2014. "'Un buon virtuoso, agitato dalla fortuna, dalla quale sortì vari accidenti'. Giuseppe Corsi: un maestro marsicano nel Seicento europeo". In "E nostra guida sia la Stravaganza": Giuseppe Corsi da Celano musicista del Seicento, edited by Galliano Ciliberti and Giovanni Tribuzio, 43–45. Bari: Florestano.
- Newman, William S. 1972. The Sonata in the Baroque Era. New York: W. W. Norton.
- Schnoebelen, Ann, and Marc Vanscheeuwijk. 2001. "Torelli, Giuseppe." The New Grove Dictionary of Music and Musicians, second edition, edited by Stanley Sadie and John Tyrrell. London: Macmillan Publishers.
- Tarr, Edward H. 1974. Unpaginated editorial notes to his edition of Giuseppe Torelli, Sinfonia a 4, G. 33, in C major. London: Musica Rara.

=== Further reading ===
- Bukofzer, Manfred F. 1947. Music in the Baroque Era: From Monteverdi to Bach. New York: W. W. Norton.
- Passadore, Francesco. 2007. Catalogo tematico delle composizioni di Giuseppe Torelli (1658–1709). Padua: Edizioni de I Solisti Veneti ISBN 88-901412-6-3
