= List of compositions by Lorenzo Perosi =

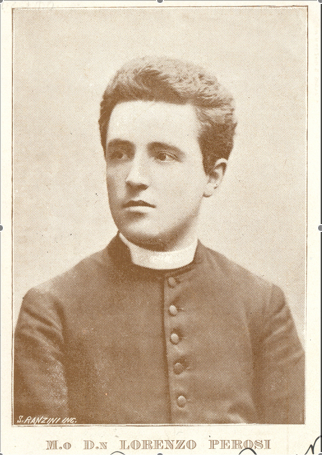
Lorenzo Perosi (c. 1900).

This is a list of compositions by Lorenzo Perosi (1872-1956) according to Mario Rinaldi (1967).

== List of compositions ==
=== Oratorios (22) ===
- La Passione di Cristo secondo S. Marco (1897)
- La Trasfigurazione di Cristo (1898)
- La Resurrezione di Lazzaro (1898)
- La Resurrezione di Cristo (1898)
- Il Natale del Redentore (1899)
- L'entrata di Cristo in Gerusalemme (1900)
- La Strage degli Innocenti (1900)
- Mosè (1900)
- Stabat Mater (1904)
- Il Giudizio Universale (1904)
- Dies Iste (1904)
- Transitus Animae (1907)
- In Patris Memoriam (1909)
- Vespertina Oratio (1912)
- Le Sette Parole di Nostro Signore Gesu' Cristo sulla Croce (1913)
- La Samaritana (1913)
- In Diebus Tribolationis (1916)
- Il Sogno Interpretato (1928)
- In Fratris Memoriam (1930)
- In Transitu Sancti Patris Nostri Francisci (1937)
- Natalitia (1937)
- Il Nazareno (1950)

=== Masses (54) ===
- Missa Davidica (1894)
- Missa Patriarcalis (1894)
- Missa Brevis in Honorem BMV Sub Titulo Piratellii (1894)
- Messa corale da requiem (1895)
- Missa in Honorem Beati Ambrosii (1895)
- Missa in Honorem Beati Gregori Barbarici (1897)
- Missa in Honorem SS Gervasii et Protasii (1897)
- Missa Te Deum Laudamus (1897)
- Missa Eucharistica (1897)
- Missa Prima Pontificalis (1897)
- Messa di Requiem (1897)
- Missa Pro Defunctis (1898)
- Missa Benedicamus Domino (1899)
- Messa per la Canonizzazione del Beato Giovanni Battista de La Salle (1900)
- Messa di Requiem (1902)
- Missa Leone XIII (1903)
- Missa Secunda Pontificalis (1906)
- Missa Pro Defunctis (1913)
- Messa per l'anno Giubilare (1933)
- Messa per Don Bosco (1934)
- Messa Gregoriana di Requiem (1936)
- Missa in Honorem Beata Cabrini (1938)
- Messa Pio XII (1942)
- Missa in Honorem S. Scolastica (1947)
- Missa Emicat Meridies (1952)
- Missa Cerviana
- Missa O Santissima
- Missa in Honorem S Franciscae Romanae
- Messa di Requiem
- Messa Pio X
- Missa de Beata
- Missa Prima in Honorem Beati Caroli
- Missa Secunda in Honorem Beati Caroli
- Missa Natalitia in Honorem S. Josephi Cottolengo
- Messa a cinque voci dispari (1894), lost
- Messa Marciana (1897), lost
- Missa Prima Gregoriana (1897), lost
- Missa Praeconium Gloriarum (1897), lost
- Messa in Suffraggio del Maestro Salvatore Meluzzi (1905), lost
- Missa Secunda Gregoriana (1937), lost
- Messa San Francesco Zaverio (1952), lost
- Messa degli Ottant'anni (1952), lost
- Messa S. Gregorio del Bufalo (1954), lost
- Messa di Natale (only some parts survived)
- Messa per la Circoncisione (only some parts survived)
- Messa di Quaresima I domenica (only some parts survived)
- Messa di Quaresima II domenica (only some parts survived)
- Messa di Quaresima III domenica (only some parts survived)
- Messa per le Palme (only some parts survived)
- Messa di Pasqua (only some parts survived)
- Messa per l'Ascensione (only some parts survived)
- Messa di Pentecoste (only some parts survived)
- Messa Immacolata Gaudens Gaudebo (only some parts survived)
- Messa San Paolo (only some parts survived)

=== Motets (342) ===
- Acclamationes
- Acclamationes Pio XI
- Ad Nonam
- Adoramus te
- Adorna Thalamun
- Ad Tertiam
- Aeterna Coeli
- A Gesu' Bambino
- Alleluja e Graduale per la festa di San Marco
- Alleluja e Graduale per la festa della Dedicazione
- Al Signore levate o genti
- Alma Redemptoris Mater, ad una voce. Melodie Sacre, Anno I, 1897
- Amen
- Animam meam dilectam
- 6 Antifone per la festa di San Marco
- 6 Antifone per la festa della Santa Famiglia
- Ascendit Deus
- Assoluzione
- Assoluzione
- Ave di Fatima
- Ave Joseph
- Ave Maria
- Ave Maria
- Ave Maria
- Ave Maria
- Ave Maris Stella
- Ave Maris Stella
- Ave Maris Stella
- Ave Regina Coelorum
- Ave Rex Noster
- Ave Roche Sanctissime
- Ave Verum
- Beata Dei Genitrix
- Beata Viscera
- Beate Marce
- Beati qui Lugent
- Beatissimo Padre Nostro
- Beatus Vir
- Beatus Vir
- Benedictus
- Benedictus
- Benedictus sit Deus Pater
- Bonitatem
- Cantabo Domino
- Cantata dell'anima
- Cantata in onore della beata Francesca Cabrini
- Cantabus Domino
- Canzoncine Sacre Popolari
- Canzone della Madonna della Fiducia
- Christus Factus est
- Clamavi
- Communio
- Canfitebor
- Canfitebor
- Canfitebor
- Confitemini Domini
- Confitebor Tibi Domine
- Cor Jesu Fragrans
- Corpus Domini
- Credidi
- Credidi
- Credo
- Credo
- Cum Appropinquarent
- Decora Lux
- De Profundis
- Det Chatarina
- Deus in Adjutorium
- Deus Tuorum
- Die Jahreszeiten von Dodenstidt
- Dignare me
- Discendite a Me maledicti
- Dixit Dominus
- Dixit Dominus
- Dixit Dominus
- Dixit Dominus
- Dixit Dominus
- Dixit Dominus
- Domine Jesu Christe
- Domus mea
- Dormi Non Piangere
- Ecce Panis
- Ecce Sacerdos
- Ecce Sacerdos Magnus
- Ecce Sacerdos Magnus
- Eram Quasi Agnus Innocens
- Eucharistica
- Exaudi Domine
- Exultate Orbis
- Fortem Virili
- Gloria Laus
- Graduale
- Graduale dell'Ascensione
- Gaudens Gaudebo
- Hoc Est Corpus Meum
- Hodie Nobis Coelorum Rex
- Hodie Nobis De Coelo
- Hymnis
- Hymnus Sanctae Sipherusae
- Iam Nostra
- In Convertendo Dominus
- In Convertendo Dominus
- In Festis BMV
- In Festis BMV per Annum
- In Festo S. Hermangorae et Fortunati
- Ingrediente Domino
- In medio Ecclesiae
- In Monte Oliveti
- In nativitate Domini
- Inni (10)
  - Chi mai Dolente…
  - Mille volte benedetta
  - O Pane del Ciel
  - Dormi non piangere
  - O bella mia speranza
  - Neve non tocca
  - Inno dei Santi
  - Signor che in Ciel
  - La fortuna
  - In canto dell'estate
- Inni
- Inno al Crocefisso della Cattedrale
- Inno al Vescovo Tesorieri
- Inno a Pio IX
- Inno a San Cassiano
- Inno per il Natale
- Intende Nobis Domine
- Introito
- Introito, Graduale e Communio
- Introito, Graduale e Communio
- Introito, Graduale e Communio
- Invocazione alla Vergine
- Ioseph Celebrent
- Iste Confessor
- Iste Confessor
- Iste Confessor
- Iste Confessor
- Jerusalem Surge
- Jestorum Animae
- Jesu Coronam Virginorum
- Jesu Dulci Memoria
- Jesu Redemptor
- Jesu Redemptor
- Jesu Redemptor
- Jesum Tradit Impius
- Jubilate Deo
- Jubilate Deo
- Justorum Animae
- Laetatus sum in His
- Laetatus sum in His
- Lauda Jerusalem
- Laudate Dominum
- Laudate Dominum
- Laudate in Cymbalis
- Laudate Pueri
- Laudate Pueri
- Laudate Pueri
- Laudate Pueri
- Laudate Pueri
- 6 Laudi Spirituali
- Legem Pone
- Libera me
- Litanie
- Litanie
- Litanie alla Madonna
- Litanie alla Beata Vergine
- Litanie Lauretane
- Lodate Maria
- Lode a maria
- Magnificat
- Magnificat
- Magnificat
- Magnificat
- Magnificat
- Magnificat
- Magnificat
- Magnificat
- Magnificat
- Magnificat
- Magnificat
- Magnificat
- Magnificat
- Marce
- Maria Mater Gratiae
- Meditazioni.
  - 1. Ecce maria
  - 2. Kyrie (ambrosiano)
  - 3. Ascendo ad Patrem
  - 4. Qui me confessis
  - 5. Pacem habet (ambrosiano)
  - 6. Hoc est praeceptum
  - 7. Ave Maris Stella
  - 8. Nunc Sanctae nobis Spiritus
  - 9. Iste confessor
  - 10. In exitu
  - 11. Manum suam
  - 12. Salutis humanae
- 13 Meditazioni sopra corali
- Melodia per inno
- Memento Domine
- Memor tacet
- Memento Esto
- Mille volte benedetta
- Miserere
- Miserere
- Misterium Ecclesiae
- Mondo piu' per me non sei
- 4 Mottetti Encomiastici
- 8 Mottetti per il Natale
- Mottetto a San Luigi
- Mottetto a Santa Caterina da Siena
- Mottetto per Gesu' Bambino
- Mottetto per l'Avvento
- Nisi Dominus
- Nisi Dominus
- Noi siam figli di Maria
- Nunc Sanctae Nobis
- Nunc Sanctae Nobis
- O Amabile Maria
- O Bella mia Speranza
- O Clemens o Pia
- O Cor Jesu
- O del Cielo gran Regina
- O Emmanuel
- Offertorio in Missa Pro Defunctis
- Offertorio per il Corpus Domini
- Offertorio per il Santo Natale
- Offertorio per I Santi
- O Lux Beata Coelitum
- O Magnum Mysterium
- O Maria conceptita senza peccato
- O Maria Concepta
- O Pane del Ciel
- O quam suavis est
- Ora pro Nobis
- Ora pro Nobis, Sancta Dei genitrix
- O Redemptor
- Oremus
- Oremus pro Pontefice
- Oremus pro Pontefice
- Oremus pro Pontefice
- O Rex gentium
- O Roma nobilis
- O Sacrum Convivium
- O Sacrum Convivium
- O Sacrum Convivium
- O Sacrum Convivium
- O Salutaris Hostia
- O Salutaris Hostia
- O Salutaris Hostia
- O Salutaris Hostia
- O Sanctissima Anima
- O Sidus Feltricae
- Ostende Nobis Domine
- O Trinitas Domine
- O Vergine Divina
- Pane del Ciel
- Pange Lingua
- Pange Lingua
- Pange Lingua
- Pange Lingua
- Pater Noster
- Per la Festa dell'Addolorata
- Placare Christe
- Placare
- Psalmodia Modulata
- Puer Natus est
- Quem Vidistis Pastores
- Qui Ascendet
- Qui Ascendet in Montem Domini
- Quisquis es in Mensa
- Recordare Domine
- Reges Tharsis
- Regina Coeli
- Requiem
- Respice
- Responsori dei tre mattutini delle tenebre
- 4 Responsori per il natale
- Rondinella Pellegrina
- Rovate Colli Desuper
- Sacerdotes Domini
- Sacerdos et Pontifex
- Sacerdos et Pontifex
- Sacris Solemnis
- Sacro Cuore
- Sacrum Convivium
- 11 Salmi
- Salutazione a San Giuseppe
- Salve Regina
- Salve Regina
- Salve Regina
- Sancta Maria Succurre Miseris
- Sancta et Immaculata
- Sanctorum Meritis
- Sciogliamo un cantico
- Sei pura sei pian
- Sepulto Domino
- Siam Rei di Mille Errori
- Signor che in Ciel
- Si Queris Miracula
- Spes Nostra
- Stabat Mater
- Satuit ei Dominus
- Sub Tuum Praesidium
- T'adoriam ostia divina
- Tantum ergo
- Tantum ergo
- Tantum ergo
- Tantum ergo
- Tantum ergo
- Tantum ergo
- Tantum ergo
- Tantum ergo
- Tantum ergo
- Tantum ergo
- Te Aeternum
- Te Deum
- Te Deum
- Te Deum
- Te Deum Laudamus
- Te Deum per l'anno giubilare
- Te Deum Solenne
- Tenebrae Factae Sunt
- Terribilis est
- Tota Pulchra, ad una voce. Melodie Sacre, Anno I, 1897
- Tota Pulchra es Maria
- Tristes Erant
- Tristis est Anima mea
- Tu es Petrus
- Tui Sunt Coeli
- Turba
- Unxit te Deus
- Ut Inimicos Sactae Ecclesiae
- Veni Creator
- Veni Creator
- Veni Creator
- Veni Sancte Spiritus
- Verbum Caro
- Verbum Caro
- Verbum Supernum
- Verbum Supernum
- Veritas mea
- Vespri Solenni
- Vexilla Regis Prodeunt
- Victimae Paschali Laudes

=== Other vocal works (23) ===
- Alla Madonna della Fiducia
- Anno Santo
- Canzone del Grillo
- Coro di Fanciulli
- Domine Salvum me Fac
- Hispania Vivat!
- Inno al Gran Sasso D'Italia
- Inno alla Madonna della Misericordia
- Inno alla Santa Infanzia
- Inno a Santa Caterina e a San Francesco
- Inno a Sant'Omobono
- Inno Cattolico
- Inno degli Orfani del Mare
- Inno dei Pellegrini
- Inno del Santo
- Inno Eucaristico
- Inno Eucaristico
- Inno Mater Orphanorum
- Mottetto
- O Dei Cristiani Aiuto
- O Padre nostro
- O Sovrana
- Quasi Palma Exaltata sum in Cades

=== Orchestral works (26) ===
- Adagio per orchestra (1931)
- Concerto per Clarinetto e Orchestra (1928)
- Concerto per Grande Orchestra
- Concerto per pianoforte e orchestra (1916)
- Concerto per piccola orchestra (1901)
- Concerto per violino e orchestra no. 1 (1903)
- Concerto per violino e orchestra no. 2 (1916)
- Dormi non piangere
- Gerusalemme
- La festa del villaggio (1959)
- Le ore di Londra
- Pastorale (1901)
- Scherzo (1901)
- Roma
- Venezia
- Firenze
- Messina
- Verona
- Tortona
- Milano
- Torino
- Genova
- Napoli
- Tema Variato (1901)
- Tema e variazioni per violino e orchestra
- Variazioni

=== Chamber works (34) ===
- Duvunque il guardo io giro
- Elegia per violoncello
- Inno cattolico
- 200 piccoli pezzi per clarinetto e pianoforte (1928)
- Quartetto no. 1 (1928)
- Quartetto no. 2
- Quartetto no. 3 (1930)
- Quartetto no. 4
- Quartetto no. 5
- Quartetto no. 6
- Quartetto no. 7
- Quartetto no. 8
- Quartetto no. 9
- Quartetto no. 10
- Quartetto no. 11
- Quartetto no. 12
- Quartetto no. 13
- Quartetto no. 14
- Quartetto no. 15
- Quartetto no. 16
- Quartetto no. 17
- Quartetto no. 18 (1929)
- Quintetto no. 1 (1930)
- Quintetto no. 2
- Quintetto no. 3
- Quintetto no. 4
- Quintetto no. 5 (1931)
- Sonata per violino e pianoforte
- Sonata per violoncello e pianoforte
- Suite in tre tempi (1898)
- Tema con Variaziioni (1913)
- Trio no. 1 (1900)
- Trio no. 2 (1900)
- Trio no. 3 (1900)

=== Keyboard (11) ===
- Andantino
- Preludio
- Ad multos annos
- Centonum di pezzi per organo
- Fugato
- Interludi per organo
- Interludio per organo
- 13 Meditazioni per organo
- Preludio per organo (1958)
- XX Trii per organo (1894)
- Litanie Lauretane per piano
