= Petronio Franceschini =

Italian Baroque composer (1651–1680)

Petronio Franceschini (Bologna, January 9, 1651 – Venice, December 4, 1680) was a Baroque composer from Italy.

== Biography ==
Franceschini studied under Giacomo Antonio Perti and became also the main cellist in Basilica di San Petronio. He produced mainly church music and he is credited with an innovative use of trumpet and voices. In addition, he wrote four operas. He died in Venice, before he had the chance to finish a fifth, Dionisio, which was completed by a contemporary of his, Giovanni Domenico Partenio. Today, Franceschini's most often performed composition (conceived with San Petronio in mind) is his Sonata in D for two trumpets and strings; this work has been recorded several times since the 1960s.

== Works ==
- Le gare di Sdegno, d'Amore e di Gelosia
- Oronte de Menfi
- Arsinoe
- Apollo in Tessaglia
- Dioniso ovvero La virtù trionfante del vitio
- Sonata for 2 Trumpets in D
