= Solo concerto =

Musical form featuring a single instrument

A solo concerto is a musical form which features a single solo instrument with the melody line, accompanied by an orchestra. Traditionally, there are three movements in a solo concerto, consisting of a fast section, a slow and lyrical section, and then another fast section. However, there are many examples of concertos that do not conform to this plan.

== History ==
=== Baroque ===
The earliest known solo concerti are nos. 6 and 12 of Giuseppe Torelli's Op. 6 of 1698. These works employ both a three-movement cycle and clear (if diminutive) ritornello form, like that of the ripieno concerto except that sections for the soloist and continuo separate the orchestral ritornellos. Active in Bologna, Torelli would have known of the operatic arias and the numerous sonatas and sinfonias for trumpet and strings produced in Bologna since the 1660s. He himself composed more than a dozen such works for trumpet, two dated in the early 1690s. Other early violin concertos are the four in Albinoni's Op. 2 (1700) and the six in Torelli's important Op. 8 (1709 - the other six works in this set are double concertos for two violins).

The most influential and prolific composer of concertos during the Baroque period was the Venetian Antonio Vivaldi (1678–1741). In addition to his nearly 60 extant ripieno concertos, Vivaldi composed approximately 425 concertos for one or more soloists, including about 350 solo concertos (two-thirds for solo violin) and 45 double concertos (over half for two violins). Vivaldi's concertos firmly establish the three-movement form as the norm. The virtuosity of the solo sections increases markedly, especially in the later works, and concurrently the texture becomes more homophonic.

Concertos for instruments other than violin began to appear early in the 18th century, including the oboe concertos of George Frideric Handel and the numerous concertos for flute, oboe, bassoon, cello, and other instruments by Vivaldi. The earliest organ concertos can probably be credited to Handel (16 concertos, c. 1735–51), the earliest harpsichord concertos to Johann Sebastian Bach (13 concertos for one to four harpsichords, c. 1735–40). In the latter case, all but probably one of the concertos are arrangements of existing works, though Bach had already approached the idea of a harpsichord concerto before 1721 in the Brandenburg Concerto no. 5.

=== Classical ===
The Classical period brought the triumph of the solo concerto over the group or multiple concerto, assisted by the continued rise of the virtuoso soloist and the growing demand for up-to-date works for performance by amateurs. The former trend appears most obviously in the large number of violin concertos written by violinists for their own use.

The Classical period also witnessed the rise of the keyboard concerto. Until about 1770, the preferred stringed keyboard instrument was usually the harpsichord, but it was gradually supplanted by the piano. The most important composers of keyboard concertos before Wolfgang Amadeus Mozart were Bach's sons. Vienna saw the production of many keyboard concertos. The last decades of the 18th century brought the rise of traveling piano virtuosos.

The concertos of this period show a broad transition from Baroque to Classical style, though many are more conservative than contemporaneous symphonies. Most are in three movements, though a significant minority adopt lighter two-movement patterns such as Allegro-Minuet and Allegro-Rondo. Dance and rondo finales are also frequent in three-movement concertos. Additionally, the ritornello form in the fast movements was replaced with the sonata form and rondo forms respectively.

Joseph Haydn's concertos are mostly from his early career. Exceptions are the Piano Concerto in D, the Cello Concerto in D, and the Trumpet Concerto.

Of Mozart's 23 original piano concertos, 17 date from his Viennese period. They are the crowning achievement of the concerto in the 18th century. Most of the works he wrote for Vienna are of a type that Mozart called grand concertos. These were intended for performance at his own subscription concerts, which were held in sizeable halls. They call for an orchestra that is much larger than a typical concerto of the time, especially in the expanded role assigned to the winds. The orchestra is rendered fully capable of sustaining a dramatic confrontation with the virtuosity and individuality of the soloist. Mozart's approach in these concertos is often clearly symphonic, both in the application of formal symphonic principles, and in a Haydnesque interest in thematic unity in the later concertos. The range of styles and expression is greater than that of most other concertos of the period, from the comic-opera elements of K.467 to the Italianate lyricism of K.488, the tragic character of K.466 and 491 to the Beethovenian heroism of K.503.

Ludwig van Beethoven's five piano concertos date from between c. 1793 and 1809. They are longer than Mozart's concertos, and call for even more virtuosity from the soloist. Beethoven's Violin Concerto (1806) exhibits similar achievements - Mozart's five violin concertos are all early works written in Salzburg in 1775, except the first in 1773.

=== Romantic ===
Early Romantic concertos include Weber's two piano concertos (1810-12) and two clarinet concertos (1811), Mendelssohn's two piano concertos (1831–37) and his important Violin Concerto (1844) and Schumann's concertos for piano (1845), cello (1850), and violin (1853). The form of these works is predominantly in the Classical three-movements. Later works in this mould include examples by Johannes Brahms (two for piano - No. 1 from 1858 and No. 2 from 1878 which adds a fourth movement - and one for violin of 1878), Edvard Grieg (piano, 1868), Max Bruch (most famously his Violin Concerto No. 1, 1868), and Antonín Dvořák (piano, violin, cello, 1876–95). In France this tradition is represented primarily by Camille Saint-Saëns (ten concertos for piano, violin, and cello, 1858–1902), in Russia by Anton Rubinstein (five piano concertos, two for cello, one for violin, 1850–74) and Pyotr Ilyich Tchaikovsky (three piano concertos, one for violin, 1874–93).

A more overtly virtuosic trend appeared in the concertos of brilliant violinists in the 19th century including Louis Spohr and Niccolò Paganini and pianists Frédéric Chopin (two concertos, 1829–30) and Franz Liszt (two concertos, original versions 1839-49). The movement structure in most of these works is in the by-now conventional ritornello-sonata type perfected by Mozart and Beethoven. Liszt's two concertos, however, are unconventional, in that the first concerto's five sections are connected both formally and thematically, and the second utilizes a still freer sectional structure. The first concerto in particular shows the influence of such continuous composite forms as those of Weber's Konzertstuck and Schubert's Wanderer Fantasy. The virtuosity required by all these concertos was facilitated by—and helped to spur—technical developments in the instruments themselves.

=== 20th century ===
Numerous 20th-century compositions were written in the vein of the 19th-century Romantic concertos - and often using its forms and styles - including concertos by Sergei Rachmaninoff (four piano concertos, 1890–1926), Jean Sibelius (violin, 1903), Edward Elgar (violin 1909–10, cello 1919), Carl Nielsen (violin, flute, clarinet), Sergei Prokofiev (five for piano, 1911–32; two for violin 1916-17 and 1935), William Walton (viola, violin, cello), Dmitri Shostakovich (two each for piano, violin, and cello), and Francis Poulenc (organ). The virtuoso tradition mirrored in these concertos is also obvious, though in radically original guise, in the concertos of Béla Bartók. Rachmaninov, Prokofiev and Bartók were all piano virtuosos.

The composers of the Second Viennese School also produced several prominent concertos: Alban Berg's Chamber Concerto for piano, violin, and 13 winds (1923–25), not fully serial but incorporating many elements of Arnold Schoenberg's new system; Anton Webern's Concerto for nine instruments (1931–34), originally intended as a piano concerto; Berg's important Violin Concerto (1935); and Schoenberg's own Violin Concerto (1935–36) and Piano Concerto (1942).

The neoclassical movement of the period following World War I produced a long series of works that returned to pre-Romantic conceptions of the concerto. Igor Stravinsky's Concerto for Piano and Winds (1923–24) is in this idiom, but his subsequent concertos are more specifically neo-Baroque in character. His Violin Concerto (1931), for example, comprises a Toccata, two Arias, and a Capriccio, and the soloist is treated more as a member of the ensemble than as a virtuoso protagonist. The solo concertos of Paul Hindemith (8 for various instruments, 1939–62) are more traditional than Stravinsky's in their treatment of the relationship between soloist and orchestra. Though hardly neoclassical in the usual sense, Richard Strauss' Horn Concerto no. 2 (1942, written some 60 years after his first) and Oboe Concerto (1945) also reach back to an earlier era, finding nostalgic inspiration in the wind concertos of Mozart.

A tendency related to the neoclassical rejection of Romantic and traditional features is the use of jazz elements in many 20th-century concertos. George Gershwin was a pioneer for such works, in for example his Rhapsody in Blue (1924) and Concerto in F for piano (1925). Jazz was a source of inspiration for Aaron Copland's Piano Concerto (1926), Stravinsky's Ebony Concerto for clarinet and jazz band (1945).

Similarly, in 1966 the accordion virtuoso John Serry completed his Concerto in C Major for Bassetti Accordion, which showcases the wide range of modern orchestral tonal qualities inherent within the solo Free bass system designed by the Italian instrument manufacturer Julio Giulietti.
