= Iste confessor =

Iste confessor is a Latin hymn used in the Divine Office at Lauds and Vespers on feasts of Confessors. It exists in two forms. Iste confessor Domini sacratus is the original 8th Century hymn and Iste confessor Domini colentes is a 1632 edition, published by Pope Urban VIII with improved Latin style. The hymn is written in Sapphic and Adonic meter.

== History ==
The earliest versions of the hymn can be found in 8th century manuscripts for the feast of St Martin of Tours (d.397) and this is reflected in the third verse which originally referred to the shrine of St Martin which was an extremely popular pilgrimage site for the sick. Although St Martin was a bishop and confessor, the hymn was gradually extended and came to be used for all confessors, including non-bishops in the Roman Breviary and other Latin liturgical rites. In the reforms following the Second Vatican Council, the 1974 Liturgy of the Hours restored the hymn for use on the feast of St. Martin, appointed for the Office of Readings and Vespers.

== Text of Hymn ==
The Roman Breviary published by Pope Urban VIII had two variations for the 3rd and 4th lines of this hymn: "Hac die laetus méruit beátas Scándere sedes" on the day of the confessor's death, otherwise it was changed to "Hac die laetus méruit suprémos Laudis honóres." This decree became known as the "mutator tertius versus." In 1955, reforms to the rubrics of the Breviary and Calendar removed the decree and kept the latter text, i.e. "méruit suprémos Laudis honóres."

Iste confessor Domini colentes

1 Iste confessor Domini colentes
Quem pie laudant populi per orbem:
Hac die lætus meruit beatas
Scandere sedes.
[If it is not the day of his death,
the last line is changed to:]
Hac die lætus meruit supremos
Laudis honores.

2 Qui pius, prudens, humilis, pudicus,
Sobriam duxit sine labe vitam,
Donec humanos animavit auræ
Spiritus artus.

3 Cuius ob præstans meritum frequenter,
Ægra quæ passim iacuere membra,
Viribus morbi domitis, saluti
Restituuntur.

4 Noster hinc illi chorus obsequentem
Concinit laudem, celebresque palmas;
Ut piis eius precibus iuvemur
Omne per ævum.

5 Sit salus illi, decus, atque virtus,
Qui super cæli solio coruscans,
Totius mundi seriem gubernat
Trinus et unus. Amen.

Iste confessor Domini sacratus

1 Iste Confessor Domini sacratus,
Festa plebs cuius celebrat per orbem,
Hodie lætus meruit secreta
Scandere cæli.

2 Qui pius, prudens, humilis, pudicus,
Sobrius, castus fuit, et quietus,
Vita dum præsens vegetavit eius
Corporis artus.

3 Ad sacrum cuius tumulum frequenter,
Membra languentum modo sanitati,
Quolibet morbo fuerint gravata,
Restituuntur.

4 Unde nunc noster chorus in honorem
Ipsius, hymnum canit hunc libenter,
Ut piis eius meritis iuvemur
Omne per ævum.

5 Sit salus illi, decus, atque virtus,
Qui supra cæli residens cacumen,
Totius mundi machinam gubernat
Trinus et unus. Amen.

== English Versions ==
Due to differences between the Latin versions of the hymn, and due to the demands of rendering the original Latin into metrical English which was suitable for singing, the translations below are thematically accurate, rather than literal translations.

This is the day whereon the Lord's true witness trns John O’Conner 1902

1 This is the day whereon the Lord’s true witness,
Whom all the nations lovingly do honour,
Worthy at least was found to wear forever
Glory transcendent

2 Loving, far-seeing, lowly, modest minded,
So kept he well an even course unstained
Ever while in his frame of manhood lingered
Life’s fitful breathings

3 Oft hath it been thro’ his sublime deserving
Poor human bodies, howsoever stricken
Broke and cast off the bondage of their sickness,
Healed Divinely.

4 Wherefore to him we raise the solemn chorus,
Chanting his praise and his surpassing triumph,
So may his pleading help us in the battle
All through the ages.

5 Healing and power, grace and beauteous honour
Always be His, who shining in the highest,
Ruleth and keepeth all the world’s vast order,
One God, three Persons.

The Confessor of Christ, from Shore to Shore trn Fr. Edwards Caswall, 1849

1 The Confessor of Christ, from shore to shore
Worshipp’d with solemn rite;
This day receives those honours which are his,
High in the realms of light.

2 Holy and innocent were all his ways;
Sweet, temperate, unstain’d;
His life was prayer,—his every breath was praise,
While breath to him remain’d.

3 Ofttimes his merits high in every land,
In cures have been displayed;
And still does health return at his command
To many a frame decay’d.

4 Therefore to him triumphant praise we pay,
And yearly songs renew;
Praying our glorious Saint for us to pray,
All the long ages through.

5 To God, of all the centre and the source,
Be power and glory given;
Who sways the mighty world through all its course,
From the bright throne of Heaven.

He whose confession God of old accepted Trn Laurence Housman 1906

1 He, whose confession God of old accepted,
Whom through the ages all now hold in honour
Gaining his guerdon this day came to enter
Heaven’s high portal

2 God-fearing, watchful, pure of mind and body,
Holy and humble, thus did all men find him,
While, through his members, to the life immortal
Mortal life called him.

3 Thus to the weary, from the life enshrined
Potent in virtue, flowed humane compassion;
Sick and sore laden, howsoever burdened
There they found healing.

4 So now in chorus, giving God the glory,
Raise we our anthem gladly to his honour,
That in fair kinship we may all be sharers
Here and hereafter.

5 Honour and glory, power and salvation,
Be in the highest unto Him who reigneth
Changeless in Heaven over earthly changes
Triune, eternal.

== See also ==
- Canonical Hours
- Latin Psalters
- Lauds
- Vespers
