= Pedro de Cristo =

Portuguese composer (1545/1550–1618)

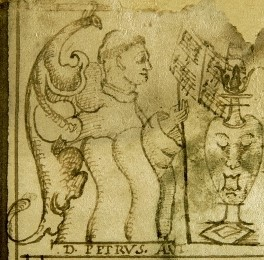
- Born: 1545/1550; Coimbra, Portugal
- Died: 12 December 1618; Coimbra, Portugal
- Occupation: Composer

Pedro de Cristo (1545/1550 – 12 December 1618) was a Portuguese composer of Renaissance music. He is one of the most important Portuguese polyphonists of the 16th and 17th centuries.

== Life ==
Pedro de Cristo was born in Coimbra, and in 1571 entered the Augustinian monastery of Santa Cruz in Coimbra. While there, he studied under Francisco de Santa Maria, who was the current chapel master (mestre de capela). Pedro de Cristo succeeded Francisco de Santa Maria as chapel master before serving in the same role at the Monastery of São Vicente de Fora in Lisbon. Cristo was ordered to return to Santa Cruz in 1605. In 1615, he was allowed to return to São Vicente. He died as the result of a fall in Coimbra in 1618.

== Music and Influence ==
While at the Santa Cruz monastery, Pedro de Cristo likely studied under the chapel master Francisco de Santa Maria. This influence can be seen in Cristo's early music through his limited vocal range, syllabic text settings, and the combined use of cambiata and passing tones of figuration.

Pedro de Cristo was not only known for his lively compositions of chansonetas (more commonly known as vilancicos), but also for his versatile background in various instruments. Cristo could play several instruments, including the keyboard, harp, flute, and dulcian. A contemporary manuscript, the Livro dos Recebimentos of the Arquivo da Torre do Tombo notes his death as follows : "Dom Pedro de Christo / tangedor de baixão E tecla excellente / objit de huma queda” (Dom Pedro de Christo / excellent player of the dulcian and keyboard / died as the result of a fall).

Determining the surviving works of Pedro de Cristo is challenging. Many pieces are found to align with his style, but are clearly composed by others. Anonymous works found in several sources seem to be his based on stylistic traits, however credit remains uncertain. However, the work of the musicologist Owen Rees has resulted in the identification of a significant corpus of works. Very few of Cristo's Mass settings survive, leaving only one complete Ordinary, one weekday Mass, and a standalone Gloria.

Much of Pedro de Cristo's earlier work appears in two choirbooks, while another two with his later work date near the end of his life. Cristo's early motets are somewhat novice, utilizing unusual clef combinations and limited vocal ranges. Over time, his style became more distinctive, employing syllabic text settings in crotchets. This was unusual for Portugal at the time, and his rhythmic stye became notable in his later polychoral works. These works include his Magnificat and Sanctorum merities. Most of Pedro de Cristo's surviving compositions are set for four or five voices and imitative in style. His music is also marked by its conciseness as well as melodic and harmonic sequences.

== Works ==
(alphabetical order - incomplete)

- Ave Maria à 8
- Ave maris stella
- Ay mi Dios
- Beata viscera Mariae
- Beate martir
- Dum complerentur dies Pentecostes
- Es nascido
- Hodie nobis
- In manus tuas
- Magnificat à 8
- O magnum mysterium
- Osanna filio David
- Quaeramus cum pastoribus
- Regina coeli
- Salva nos Domine
- Sanctissimi quinque martires
- Sanctorum meritis
- Tristis est anima mea
