= Giovanni Battista Casali =

Italian musician

Giovanni Battista Casali (1715–6 July 1792) was an Italian musician.

Casali was born in Rome in 1715. From 1759 until his death he held the position of choir-master in the Basilica of St. John Lateran. Casali was one of the last of his period to write for voices a cappella.

== Works ==
Of his numerous compositions a mass in G major and several motets (Confitebor tibi, Ave Maria, Exaltabo, Improperium) have been reprinted in Lueck's "Collection" (Trier, 1859). These compositions, while liturgical in spirit and form, show a considerable departure from the tradition of the Roman School in a freer use of dissonance, and they also bear witness to the influence of opera, in which form Casali also wrote. Most of his works are preserved in the library of Abbate Santini in Rome.
