= Giuseppe Corsi =

Italian Baroque composer (1631/1632–1691)

Giuseppe Corsi Evangelisti (Vangelisti) (1631/1632 in County of Celano – after 10 March 1691 in Ancona or Modena) better known as Gioseppe Corso Celani or Giuseppe Corsi da Celano, was an Italian composer of the Baroque era. He was mainly active at Rome, where he was Maestro di cappella. He was the teacher of Giacomo Antonio Perti and Petronio Franceschini.

== Biography ==
A student in Rome at the Jesuit fathers under the guidance of Giacomo Carissimi, he was active as an outstanding Maestro in Gallese (Altemps family), Città di Castello (Cattedrale di S. Florido), Naples (Montalto family), Rome (Basilica di S. Maria Maggiore, Basilica di S. Giovanni in Laterano, Chiesa di S. Maria Maddalena, Chiesa Nuova), Loreto (Basilica della S. Casa: where he was ordained priest), Ancona (Cattedrale di S. Ciriaco) and Parma (Basilica di S. Maria della Steccata and Farnese family). Accused by the Inquisition for having "deflowered" a spinster, he was tortured and imprisoned in Rome for a few years on the orders of Pope Innocent XI in the Albornoz fortress of Narni.

== Works ==
Works by Giuseppe Corsi da Celano (sigla TriCo), cataloged by Giovanni Tribuzio in 2014, are 83:

- TriCo 1-3 (Masses);
- TriCo 4-12 (Parts of mass);
- TriCo 13 (Canticles);
- TriCo 14-20 (Psalms);
- TriCo 21-23 (Antiphons);
- TriCo 24 (Hymns);
- TriCo 25-26a-aj (Responsories);
- TriCo 27 (Litanies);
- TriCo 28-40 (Motets);
- TriCo 41-44 (Oratorios);
- TriCo 45-46 (Oratorio cantatas);
- TriCo 47-68 (Arias and cantatas for a voice and basso continuo);
- TriCo 69 (Cantatas for two voices and basso continuo);
- TriCo 70 (Cantatas for three voices and basso continuo);
- TriCo 71-83 (Attributed and spurious works).

== Bibliography ==
=== Biographies ===
- Raoul Meloncelli, Corsi (Corso), Giuseppe (detto anche Corso da Celano, il Celano, Celani), in Dizionario Biografico degli Italiani, vol. XXIX, 1983 (online).
- Beatrice Barazzoni, Un esempio di cappella di corte. la cappella musicale dei duchi Farnese a Parma e l’opera dimenticata di Giuseppe Corsi, in Barocco Padano 1, edited by Alberto Colzani, Andrea Luppi and Maurizio Padoan, Como, Antiquae Musicae Italicae Studiosi, 2002, pp. 381–406.
- Eleonora Simi Bonini, Alcuni aspetti della vita di Giuseppe Corsi da Celano, in Musica tra storia e filologia. Studi in onore di Lino Bianchi, edited by Federica Nardacci, Rome, Istituto Italiano per la Storia della Musica, 2010, pp. 547–565.
- Galliano Ciliberti, Giovanni Tribuzio (edited by), «E nostra guida sia la Stravaganza». Giuseppe Corsi da Celano musicista del Seicento, Bari, Florestano Edizioni, 2014, pp. 290.

=== Critical editions ===
- Giuseppe Corsi da Celano, La Stravaganza. Cantata per soprano e basso continuo, edited by Davide Gualtieri, Lucca, Libreria Musicale Italiana, 2012. It's an attempt of a critical edition, however, it ignores the sources of Lyon (attributed to Carlo Ambrogio Lonati, identified by Gloria Rose and Stephen R. Miller), Paris (basso continuo, identified by Catherine Massip), Brussels (anonymous, identified by Giovanni Tribuzio) and Cambridge (identified by Berthold Over and considered the oldest).

== Discography ==
- Giuseppe Corsi: Mottetti - Cantate, Christophe Carré (sopranist), Ensemble Labirinto Armonico, Baryton, 2012.
- Giuseppe Corsi: Bass Cantatas, Mauro Borgioni (baritone), Romabarocca Ensemble, Brilliant Classics, 2022.

== See also ==
- Petronio Franceschini
- Giacomo Antonio Perti
- Arcangelo Corelli
