= List of compositions by Johann David Heinichen =

A catalogue of known compositions by Johann David Heinichen was published in 1913 by Gustav Adolph Seibel. However, this is not a complete list, as another catalogue of instrumental works was published later by Günther Hausswald, and discrepancies exist between the two.

== Orchestral works ==
=== Orchestral suites ===
- Seibel 205. Suite for 2 oboes & bassoon in G major (Hwv II:1)
- Seibel 206. Suite for strings in G major (Hwv II:2)
- Seibel 267. Tafelmusik in F major

=== Symphonies ===
- Seibel 207. Sinfonia in D major (Hwv IV:1)
- Seibel 208. Sinfonia in A major (Hwv IV:3)
- Seibel 209. Sinfonia in F major (Hwv IV:4)
- Seibel 210. Sinfonia in F major (Hwv IV:5)

=== Concerti grossi ===
- Seibel 211. Concerto grosso in C major (Hwv I:1)
- Seibel 213. Concerto grosso in G major (Hwv I:7)
- Seibel 214. Concerto grosso in G major (Hwv I:4 & 6) - Hausswald identified 2 versions of the concerto, one from 1715 in Darmstadt and the other from 1717 in Venice.
- Seibel 215. Concerto grosso in G major (Hwv I:3)
- Seibel 216. Concerto grosso in G major (Hwv I:5)
- Seibel 217. Concerto grosso in G major (Hwv I:2)
- Seibel 223. Concerto a quattro in D major (Hwv IV:2)
- Seibel 226. Concerto grosso in D major (Hwv I:14)
- Seibel 231. Concerto grosso in F major (Hwv I:15), also called Concerto in fa Maggiore per 2 Corni da Caccia e Orchestra da Camera
- Seibel 232. Concerto grosso in F major (Hwv I:17)
- Seibel 233. Concerto grosso in F major (Hwv I:20)
- Seibel 234. Concerto grosso in F major (Hwv I:18)
- Seibel 235. Concerto grosso in F major (Hwv I:19)
- Seibel 236. Concerto a quattro in B♭ major
- Seibel 242. Pastorale in A major (Hwv III:21)
- Seibel deest. Concerto a quattro in D major

== Concerti for solo instruments ==
=== Violin concertos ===
- Seibel 224. Violin Concerto in D major (Hwv I:13)
- Seibel 239. Violin Concerto in E♭ major (Hwv I:23)
- Seibel deest. Violin Concerto in B♭ major
- Seibel deest. Violin Concerto in A minor

=== Flute concertos ===
- Seibel 219. Flute Concerto in G major (Hwv I:8)
- Seibel 220. Flute Concerto in G major (Hwv I:9)
- Seibel 221. Flute Concerto in E minor (Hwv I:11)
- Seibel 225. Flute Concerto in D major (Hwv I:12)

=== Oboe concertos ===
- Seibel 212. Oboe Concerto in A minor (Hwv VI:1)
- Seibel 227. Oboe Concerto in D major (Hwv V:3)
- Seibel 228. Concerto for oboe d'amore in A major (Hwv V:4)
- Seibel 230. Oboe Concerto in F major (Hwv I:16)
- Seibel 237. Oboe Concerto in G minor (Hwv I:21)
- Seibel deest. Oboe Concerto in G major

=== Keyboard concertos ===
- Seibel 229. Harpsichord Concerto in F major (Hwv III:4)

=== Double concertos ===
- Seibel 218. Concerto for flute & violin in E minor (Hwv V:2)
- Seibel 222. Concerto for 2 oboes in E minor (Hwv I:10)
- Seibel 231. Concerto for 2 Corni da Caccia in F Major (HauH 1:15), see above
- Seibel 238. Concerto for oboe & flute in G minor (Hwv I:22)
- Seibel 240. Concerto for oboe & violin in C minor (Hwv I:24)
- Seibel 245. Sonata da chiesa for oboe & violin in G major (reworking of Oboe Concerto, Seibel 212)
- Seibel deest. Concerto for 2 flutes or flute & oboe in D major

== Chamber music ==
=== Solo sonatas ===
- Seibel 260. Flute Sonata in D major (Hwv III:2)
- Seibel 261. Flute Sonata in D major (Hwv III:1)
- Seibel 262. Flute Sonata in D major
- Seibel 263. Violin Sonata in F major (Hwv III:3)
- Seibel 265. Oboe Sonata in G minor (Hwv III:5)
- Seibel 266. Violin Sonata in C minor (Hwv III:7)

=== Duo sonatas ===
- Seibel 277. Sonata for oboe & bassoon in C minor (Hwv III:6)

=== Trio sonatas ===
- Seibel 243. Sonata for flute, oboe & continuo in G major (Hwv III:8)
- Seibel 244. Sonata for oboe, violin & continuo in G major
- Seibel 246. Sonata for flute, violin & continuo in G major (Hwv III:9)
- Seibel 247. Sonata for flute, bassoon & continuo in G major (Hwv III:10)
- Seibel 248. Sonata for 2 flutes & continuo in G major (Hwv VI:2)
- Seibel 249. Sonata for flute, violin & continuo in G major (Hwv V:1)
- Seibel 250. Sonata for flute, violin & continuo in G major (Hwv III:11)
- Seibel 252. Sonata for 2 flutes & continuo in G major (Hwv III:12)
- Seibel 253. Sonata for oboe, violin & continuo in D major (Hwv III:18)
- Seibel 254. Sonata for oboe, viola da gamba & continuo in C minor (Hwv III:16)
- Seibel 256. Sonata for flute, viola d'amore & continuo in F major (Hwv III:13)
- Seibel 258. Sonata for oboe, violin & continuo in C minor (Hwv III:14)
- Seibel 259. Sonata for 2 oboes & continuo in C minor (Hwv III:15)
- Seibel deest. Sonata for violin, bassoon & continuo in D major

=== Quartet sonatas ===
- Seibel 251. Sonata for flute, 2 violins & continuo in G major (Hwv III:17)
- Seibel 255. Sonata for 2 violins, viola & continuo in D major (Hwv III:19)
- Seibel 257. Sonata for 2 oboes, bassoon & continuo in B♭ major (Hwv III:20)

== Works for keyboard solo ==
- Seibel 241. Fughetta for organ in D major (Hwv VII:1)
- Seibel 264. Harpsichord Sonata in F major (Hwv V:5)
- Seibel 268. Fughetta for harpsichord in D major
- Seibel 269. Larghetto for harpsichord in E♭ major
- Seibel 270. Sarabande for harpsichord in F major
- Seibel 271. Loure for harpsichord in G major

== Cantatas ==
- Seibel 137. Là, dove in grembo al colle in C major
- Seibel 138. Quanto siete fortunate in A major
- Seibel 139. Già la stagion novella in B♭ major
- Seibel 140. Glori bell' idol mio in E major
- Seibel 141. PerchË mai si bruni siete in F major
- Seibel 142. Qual fugiamai quel core in F major
- Seibel 143. Per sveglia nove fiamme in D major
- Seibel 144. A increspar l'onda con l'onda in A major
- Seibel 145. Chi puo mirarui senz' adoravi in A major
- Seibel 146. Tu mi chiedi s'io t'amo in B♭ major
- Seibel 147. Quando sciolto d'amor io mi credea in E♭ major
- Seibel 148. Dal povero mio cor in C minor
- Seibel 149. Lascia di tormentarmi in A minor
- Seibel 150. Mia Climene adorata in E major
- Seibel 151. Lontananza tiranna che vate in E♭ major
- Seibel 152. Bella te lascio addio giunia in E♭ major
- Seibel 153. Doppo tante e tante pene in E♭ major
- Seibel 154. Leggi bel Idol mio in B♭ major
- Seibel 155. Sedea Fileno un giorno in B♭ major
- Seibel 156. In riva al bel sebeto l'ontano in F major
- Seibel 157. D'Eurilla sempre amata in A major
- Seibel 158. Dove fiorito impero in G major
- Seibel 159. Usignolo che piangenda in A major
- Seibel 160. Mitilde mio tresor in C minor
- Seibel 161. Nel dolce tempo in A major
- Seibel 162. Nice se il tuo bel labro in B minor
- Seibel 163. Alla caccia dell'alme in D major
- Seibel 164. Sento là che ristretto in G minor
- Seibel 165. Voi ben sapete in G major
- Seibel 166. Rusceletto che vai scherzando in D major
- Seibel 167. Dimmi, o mio cor in C minor
- Seibel 168. Fosche tenebre e dense in F major
- Seibel 169. O deluse speranze in E♭ major
- Seibel 170. Sei gentil, sei vezzosa in G major
- Seibel 171. Intorno a quella Rosa in F major
- Seibel 172. Tormento dell'alma amore in A minor
- Seibel 173. Delizie del mio core in G major
- Seibel 174. Lieve turba canoro in B♭ major
- Seibel 175. Parto à te menzognero in D major
- Seibel 176. Ascolta, Eurillo, ascolta in D major
- Seibel 177. Più lucide, più belle in B♭ major
- Seibel 178. O beato quel giorno in A major
- Seibel 179. Mio cor amante in A major
- Seibel 180. Se mai Tirsi mio bene in D minor
- Seibel 181. La dove al pado in Riva in A major
- Seibel 182. Or che stanco dal corso in grembo in G major
- Seibel 183. La bella fiamma o Tirsi in D minor
- Seibel 184. Luci voi siete quelle de all'alma in A major
- Seibel 185. Sele amene autri ambrosi in D major
- Seibel 186. Amo sospiro ed ardo in C minor
- Seibel 187. Io scherzo, io rido, io canto in G major
- Seibel 188. D'amante sventurato in E major
- Seibel 189. Dori vezzosa Dori in D minor
- Seibel 190. Non di Fillide il seno in A minor
- Seibel 191. Bella se puo gradite in G minor
- Seibel 192. Ebra d'amor fuggia in G minor
- Seibel 193. Di giubilo tutto abbrudo in G major
- Seibel 194. Filli, che in te ravolta in A minor
- Seibel 195. Doppo lunga catena in D major
- Seibel 196. Il caro e bel piacer in G major
- Seibel 197. O giove eccelso in G major
- Seibel 198. Da più eccelsi pensieri in E minor
- Seibel 199. Deh taci crudele ingrata in D minor

== Liturgical works ==
=== Masses ===
- Seibel 1. Mass No. 1 in D major
- Seibel 2. Mass No. 4 in D major
- Seibel 2a. Missa brevis in D major (2nd version of Mass No.4)
- Seibel 3. Mass No. 6 in D major
- Seibel 4. Mass No. 8 in D major
- Seibel 5. Mass No. 9 in D major
- Seibel 6. Mass No.11 in D major
- Seibel 7. Mass No.12 in D major
- Seibel 8. Mass No. 7 in D major
- Seibel 9. Mass in D major (2nd version of Mass No.1)
- Seibel 10. Missa reformata in D major (arr. of Mass No.12 by Joseph Schuster)
- Seibel 11. Mass No. 2 in F major
- Seibel 11a. Mass in F major (2nd version of Mass No.2)
- Seibel 12. Mass No. 3 in F major
- Seibel 12a. Mass in F major (2nd version of Mass No.3)
- Seibel 13. Mass in F major (2nd version of Mass No.5)
- Seibel 14. Mass No. 5 in F major
- Seibel 15. Mass in F major (parts identical to Mass No.2)
- Seibel 16. Mass in F major (parts identical to Mass No.3)
- Seibel 17. Requiem in C major
- Seibel 18. Requiem in E♭ major
- Seibel 50. Kyrie eleison in D major (arr. by Schuster)
- Seibel 51. Cum sancto spiritu in D major (arr. by Schuster)
- Seibel 52. In gloria Dei Patri in D major (arr. by Schuster)
- Seibel 53. Et vitam venturi saeculi in D major (arr. by Schuster)
- Seibel 54. Agnus Dei in D major (arr. by Schuster)
- Seibel 55. Kyrie eleison in D minor (arr. by Schuster)
- Seibel deest. Credo in D major

=== Litanies ===
- Seibel 67. Kyrie eleison in D major (arr. by Schuster)
- Seibel 68. Kyrie eleison in D major
- Seibel 85. Litaniae pro Festo Santi Fr. Xaveri in E minor
- Seibel 86. Litaniae pro Festo Corporis Domini in E minor
- Seibel 87. Litaniae pro Festo Santi Fr. Xaveri in C minor
- Seibel 88. Litaniae pro Festo Corporis Domini in C minor

=== Cantatas ===
- Seibel 29. Cantata al Sepolcro di nostro Signoro in C minor
- Seibel 30. Cantata al Sepolcro di nostro Signoro in C minor

=== Canticles ===
- Seibel 89. Magnificat in G major
- Seibel 90. Magnificat in A major
- Seibel 91. Magnificat in F major
- Seibel 92. Magnificat in F major
- Seibel 93. Magnificat in B♭ major
- Seibel 94. Magnificat in B♭ major
- Seibel 95. Magnificat in B♭ major
- Seibel 96. Magnificat in E♭ major
- Seibel 116. Te Deum in D major
- Seibel 117. Te Deum in D major
- Seibel 118. Te Deum in D major

=== Psalms ===
==== Latin ====
- Seibel 26. Beatus vir in F major
- Seibel 27. Beatus vir in D minor
- Seibel 28. Beatus vir in E♭ major
- Seibel 31. Confitebor in A minor
- Seibel 32. Confitebor in G major
- Seibel 33. Confitebor in G minor
- Seibel 34. Credidi in F major
- Seibel 35. De profundis in C minor
- Seibel 44. Dixit Dominus in F major
- Seibel 45. Dixit Dominus in F major
- Seibel 46. Dixit Dominus in D minor
- Seibel 47. Dixit Dominus in B♭ major
- Seibel 48. Dixit Dominus in E♭ major
- Seibel 64. In exitu Israel in A minor
- Seibel 65. In exitu Israel in B♭ major
- Seibel 69. Laetatus sum in C major
- Seibel 70. Laetatus sum in D major
- Seibel 78. Lauda Jerusalem in C major
- Seibel 79. Lauda Jerusalem in D major
- Seibel 80. Lauda Jerusalem in F major
- Seibel 81. Laudate pueri in C major
- Seibel 82. Laudate pueri in G major
- Seibel 83. Laudate Dominum in F major
- Seibel 84. Laudate pueri in F major
- Seibel 97. Memento Domine David in G minor
- Seibel 98. Nisi Dominus in G minor
- Seibel 99. Nisi Dominus in C minor

==== Vernacular ====
- Seibel 36. Es lebet Jesus unser Hort in C major
- Seibel 37. Meine Seele erhebet den Herrn in C major
- Seibel 38. Ach, was soll ich Sünder machen in E minor
- Seibel 39. Warum toben die Heiden in D major
- Seibel 40. Einsamkeit, o stilles Wesen in F major
- Seibel 41. Heilig ist Gott der Herr in F major
- Seibel 42. Gegrüßet seyst du holdseelige Maria in B♭ major
- Seibel 43. Gott ist unsere Zuversicht in G minor

=== Antiphons, hymns and motets ===
- Seibel 21. Quis accendet in G major
- Seibel 22. Alma Mater redemptoris in F major
- Seibel 23. Alma Mater redemptoris in E♭ major
- Seibel 24. Ave Regina in E♭ major
- Seibel 25. Beati omnes in G minor
- Seibel 49. Domine probasti me in E minor
- Seibel 56. Haec dies quam fecit in G major
- Seibel 57. Decora lux aeternitatis in C major
- Seibel 58. Te Joseph celebrant in A minor
- Seibel 59. Ave Maris Stella in F major
- Seibel 60. Jesu Redemptor omnium in F major
- Seibel 61. Pange lingua in D minor
- Seibel 62. Veni creator Spiritus in G minor
- Seibel 63. In convertendo in C major
- Seibel 66. Libavit eos exdipe in D minor
- Seibel 100. Domine Jesu Christe in A minor
- Seibel 101. Regina coeli in G major
- Seibel 102. Regina coeli in D major
- Seibel 115. Sanctus in D major
- Seibel 119. Regina coeli in B♭ major

=== Lamentations ===
- Seibel 71. Lamentatio Jeremiae in Coena Domini I in C minor
- Seibel 72. Lamentatio Jeremiae in Coena Domini II in F minor
- Seibel 73. Lamentatio Jeremiae in Coena Domini III in F minor
- Seibel 74. Lamentatio Jeremiae per il Venendi Santo I in G minor
- Seibel 75. Lamentatio Jeremiae per il Venendi Santo II in C minor
- Seibel 76. Lamentatio Jeremiae per il Venendi Santo III in C minor
- Seibel 77. Lamentatio Jeremiae in F minor

=== Responsories ===
- Seibel 103. In monte oliveti in F major
- Seibel 104. Tristis est anima mea in F major
- Seibel 105. Ecce vidimus eum in F major
- Seibel 106. Amicus meus osculi me tradidit in A minor
- Seibel 107. Judas mercator pessimus in A minor
- Seibel 108. Unus ex discipulis meis in C major
- Seibel 109. Erat quasi Agnus innocens ductus in C major
- Seibel 110. Una hora non potuistis in G minor
- Seibel 111. Seniores res populi cruci eum fecerunt in C major
- Seibel 112. Omnes amici mei dereliquerunt in A minor
- Seibel 113. Sicut ovis ad occissionem ductus in G minor
- Seibel 114. Beata viscera Mariae Virginis in G minor

== Occasional and theatrical works ==
=== Operas ===
- Seibel 120. Flavio Crispo 1720
- Seibel 121. Le passioni per troppo amore
- Seibel 122. Mario

=== Arias for operas ===
- Seibel 123. Beleidigtes Hertz in A major
- Seibel 124. Walle mein erhitztes Bluth in C major
- Seibel 125. Unglücklich in der Liebe seyn in G minor
- Seibel 126. Dir Tugend und Jugend verknüpfet das Band in G major
- Seibel 127. Treu ist mir angebohren in B♭ major
- Seibel 128. Gehe nur verwegner Schöner in E major
- Seibel 129. Ich will die Falschheit rächen in D major
- Seibel 130. Wann hohe Häubter loben in A major
- Seibel 131. Denke nicht verdammte Liebe in F major
- Seibel 132. Edelste Freyheit, mein eintziges Vergnügen in A major
- Seibel 133. Hertz und Füß eilt mit Verlangen in F major
- Seibel 134. Meine Lippen sind voll Lachens in D major
- Seibel 135. Bella donna e che non fa? in G major (fragment)
- Seibel 136. Eures Schönsten Augen-Licht in E♭ major (fragment)

=== Serenatas ===
- Seibel 200. Diana su l'Elba
- Seibel 201. La Gara degli Dei
- Seibel 202. Zeffiro e Chori
- Seibel 203. Le notte di Nettuno e di Teti
- Seibel 204. Serenata di Moritzburg

=== Oratorios ===
- Seibel 19. La Pace di Kamberga
- Seibel 20. Passionsoratorium

== Lost works ==
- Seibel 272. Starke Kirchen-Musiquen
- Seibel 273. Sonata for 6 violins
- Seibel 274. So con un vezzo
- Seibel 275. Various works mentioned in collections
- Seibel 276. Various works mentioned in Zerbst
- Seibel deest. Mass No.10 in D major
