= Giacomo Antonio Perti =

Italian Baroque composer (1661–1756)

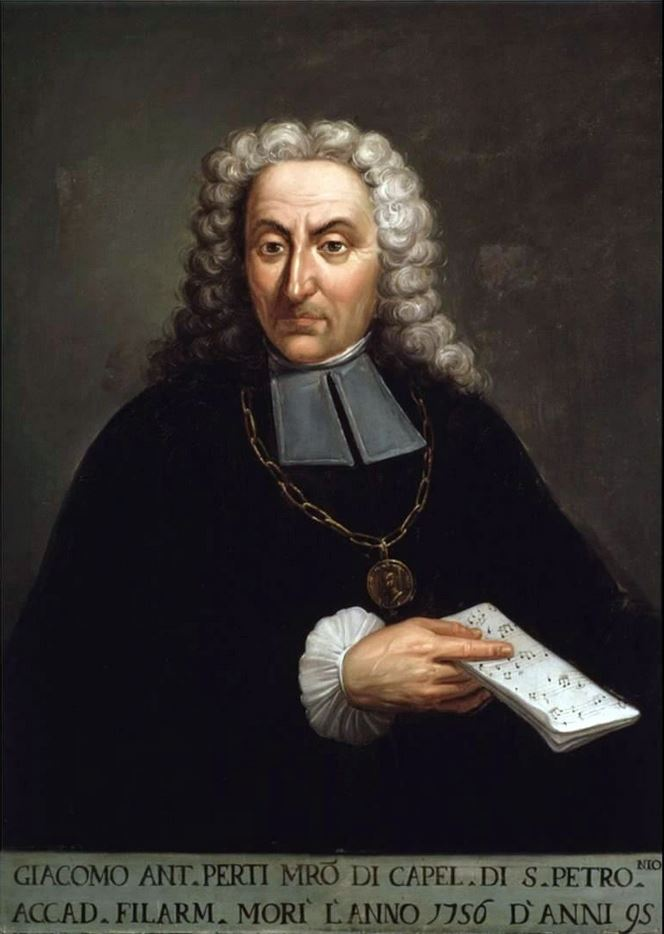
Portrait of Giacomo Antonio Perti Autore: Unknown, 18th century Collocazione: International museum and library of music - Bologna

Giacomo Antonio Perti (6 June 1661 – 10 April 1756) was an Italian composer of the Baroque era. He was mainly active at Bologna, where he was Maestro di Cappella for sixty years. He was the teacher of Giuseppe Torelli and Giovanni Battista Martini.

== Life ==
He was born in Bologna, then part of the Papal States, and began studying music early, learning harpsichord and violin there; later he studied counterpoint. By the age of 17, he had already written a mass, a motet, and a setting of the Magnificat; and in 1678 he wrote his first opera and oratorio. During a stay in Parma, where he studied with Giuseppe Corsi da Celano, he formed his sacred music style; most of his psalm settings of the 1680s and 1690s show the influence of Corsi. Later he went to Venice, most likely for a production of one of his operas.

In 1690 he was appointed to the post of Maestro di Cappella at S Pietro, replacing his uncle Lorenzo Perti. In 1696 he became Maestro di Cappella in another Bolognese church, S. Petronio, after the death of Giovanni Paolo Colonna the year before. He remained in charge for exactly sixty years, until his death at age 95.

Perti was a prolific composer of operas and sacred music, and was recognized as a distinguished musician not only by other composers but also by aristocrats and emperors, including Ferdinando de' Medici (one of the last of the Medici) and Emperors Leopold I and Charles VI.

== Works ==
Perti was highly regarded for his sacred music and his operas. Of the 26 operas he composed, few remain today. Perti maintained in his Op. 1 that he was influenced by the melodic style of Francesco Cavalli, Antonio Cesti, and Luigi Rossi; however, he shows considerable originality in instrumentation, use of dialogue and countermelody. His output of sacred music was even more remarkable: he wrote 120 psalm settings, for one voice, chorus, basso continuo, and various other instruments; 54 motets, for similar forces; 28 masses; 83 versetti and other liturgical works.

He also wrote secular music, including 142 solo cantatas (one of the commonest secular vocal forms in late 17th century Italy), and some instrumental music including sonatas and sinfonias for a variety of instruments.

=== Operas ===
- Marzio Coriolano, 1683
- Oreste in Argo, 1685
- L'incoronazione di Dario, 1686
- La Flavia, 1686
- La Rosaura, 1689
- Dionisio Siracusano, 1689
- Brenno in Efeso, 1690
- L'inganno scoperto per vendetta, 1691
- Il Pompeo, 1691
- Furio Camillo, 1692
- Nerone fatto cesare, 1693
- La forza della virtù, 1694
- Laodicea e Berenice, 1695
- Penelope la casta, 1696
- Fausta restituita all'impero, 1697
- Apollo geloso, 1698
- Lucio Vero, 1700
- Astianatte, 1701
- Dionisio re di Portogallo, 1707
- Il Venceslao, ossia Il fraticida innocente, 1708
- Ginevra principessa di Scozia, 1708
- Berenice regina d'Egitto, 1709
- Demetrio, 1709
- Rodelinda regina de' Longobardi, 1710
- Un prologo per il cortegiano, 1739

=== Oratorios ===
- Due gigli porporati nel martirio di santa Serafia e santa Sabina, Bologna, 1679
- Abramo vincitor de' propri affetti, Bologna, 1683 (rev. Agar, 1689; spurious titles: Agar scacciata, Sara)
- Il Mosè conduttor del popolo ebreo, Modena, 1685
- Oratorio della Passione, Bologna, 1685 (rev. Gesù al sepolcro, 1703)
- La beata Imelda Lambertini bolognese, (it:beata Imelda Lambertini child saint), Bologna, 1686
- «Oratorio à 6 Voci, con concertino, e concerto grosso» (unknown subject), Modena (?), 1687 (lost)
- San Galgano Guidotti, Bologna, 1694
- La Passione di Cristo, Bologna, 1694 (= Oratorio sopra la passione del Redentore = Affetti di compassione alla morte del Redentor della Vita; composed in collaboration with pupils)
- Christo al Limbo, Bologna, 1698
- La morte del giusto, overo Il transito di san Giuseppe, Venice, 1700 (lost)
- La Morte delusa, Milan, 1703 (collaboration to the pasticcio)
- I trionfi di Giosuè, Florence, 1704 (collaboration to the pasticcio; lost)
- La sepoltura di Cristo, Bologna, 1704
- San Petronio, Bologna, 1720 (pasticcio)
- La Passione del Redentore, Bologna, 1721
- I conforti di Maria Vergine addolorata per la morte del suo divin Figliuolo, Bologna, 1723 (spurious title: L'Amor Divino)
- Il figlio prodigo, undated
- Oratorio della nascita del Signore, undated
- San Francesco, undated
- La sepoltura di Cristo, undated (attributed to Perti; spurious title: San Giovanni)

== Selected recordings ==
- Messa a 5, Silvia Vajente, Pamela Lucciarini, Gloria Banditelli, Orchestra Barocca di Bologna, Paolo Faldi
- Messa a 8, New College Choir, Cappella Musicale, Sergio Vartolo
- Messa a 12. Color Temporis Vocal Ensemble, Collegium usicum Almae Matris Chamber Choir, Choir & Orchestra of the Cappella Musicale Di San Petronio.
- Lamentations. Capella Musicale di S. Petronio di Bologna, dir. Sergio Vartolo
- Musiche sacre Arìon Choir & Consort, dir Giulio Prandi. Disc with Amadeus magazine, Italy 2010
- Cantate morali e spirituali op.1, 2 CDs. Frisani, Calvi, Lepore, Cappella musicale San Petronio, Sergio Vartolo
- Abramo Vincitor De' Proprii Affetti, Laura Antonaz, Elena Biscuola, Gastone Sarti, Ensemble "Il Continuo" Bongiovanni (record label)
- Gesu al Sepolcro. Akerlund, Zanetti, Claudio Cavina, Schultze, Cechetti, Cappella Musicale di S. Petronio, Vartolo
- San Petronio (Oratorio), Pace, Nirouet, Zennaro, Spagnoli, Ensemble Seicentonovecento, Flavio Colusso. Bongiovanni 1990
- Il Mosè conduttor del popolo ebreo. Mosè: Gloria Banditelli; Faraone: Marco Bussi, Generale di Faraone: Laura Antonaz. Ensemble Les Nations. Maria Luisa Baldassari. Tactus (record label) TC 661603 (1 CD, January 2013).
