= List of Italian composers =

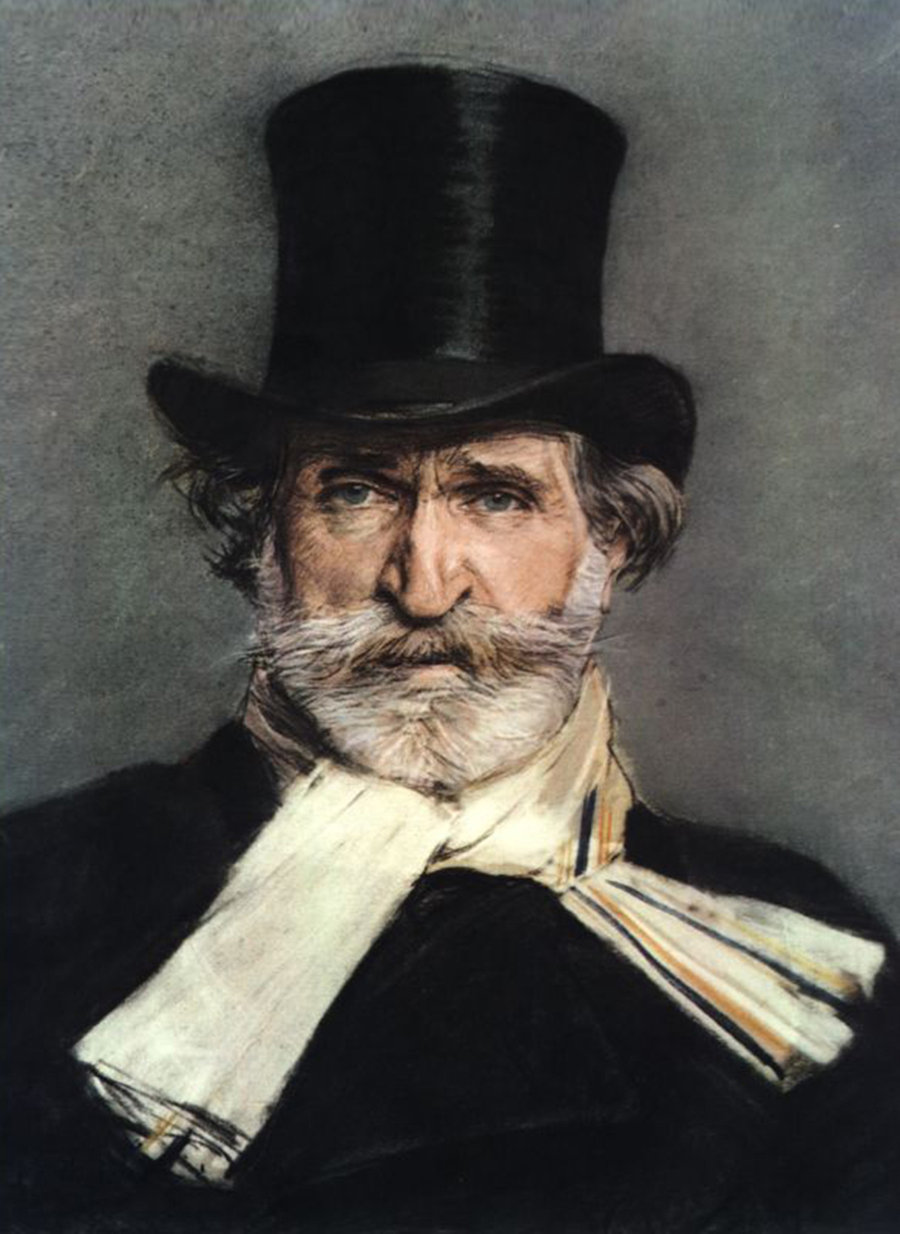
Giuseppe Verdi

This is an alphabetical list of composers from Italy, whose notability is established by reliable sources in other Wikipedia articles.

The portraits at right are ten of the most-prominent Italian composers, according to a published review.

== A ==
- Joseph Abaco (1710–1805), born Giuseppe Marie Clément Ferdinand dall'Abaco
- Marcello Abbado (1926–2020)
- Antonio Maria Abbatini (1595 – after 1679)
- Girolamo Abos (1715–1760)
- Andrea Adolfati (1721/22–1760)
- Giovanni Battista Agneletti (fl. 1656–1673)
- Maria Teresa Agnesi Pinottini (1720–1795)
- Lodovico Agostini (1534–1590)
- Paolo Agostino (c.1583–1629)
- Pirro Albergati (1663–1735)
- Domenico Alberti (c.1710–1740)
- Gasparo Alberti (c.1485 – c.1560)
- Innocentio Alberti (c.1535–1615)
- Ignazio Albertini (1644–1685), also known as Albertino
- Tomaso Albinoni (1671–1751), Venetian composer of opera and instrumental music, the "Adagio in G minor" is based on his works
- Vincenzo Albrici (1631–1695/96)
- Giovanni Maria Alemanni (fl. 1500–1525)
- Raffaella Aleotti (c.1570 – after 1646)
- Vittoria Aleotti (c.1575 – after 1620), Raffaella's sister or possibly the same person
- Felice Alessandri (1747–1798)
- Alessandro Alessandroni (1925–2017)
- Franco Alfano (1875–1954)
- Salvatore Allegra (1898–1993)
- Domenico Allegri (c. 1585–1629)
- Gregorio Allegri (1582–1652), composer of the famous Miserere, copied from memory on two hearings by the 14-year-old Mozart
- Giuseppe Allevi (1603 or 1604-1670)
- Filippo Amadei (fl. 1690–1730)
- Gaetano Amadeo (1824–1893)
- Marco Ambrosini (born 1964)
- Cataldo Amodei (1649–1693)
- Felice Anerio (c.1560–1614)
- Giovanni Francesco Anerio (c.1567–1630)
- Pasquale Anfossi (1727–1797)
- Giovanni Animuccia (c.1500–1571)
- Paolo Animuccia (died 1563)
- Andrea Anzalone (died 1656)
- Giacinto Anzalone (1606–1656)
- Andrea Antico (c.1480 – after 1538)
- Giovanni Giacomo de Antiquis (?–1608)
- Pietro Antonacci (c.1710 – c.1777)
- Antonello da Caserta (late 14th – early 15th century)
- Antonio da Cividale (fl. 1392–1421)
- Giuseppe Apolloni (1822–1889)
- Francesco Araja (1709–1762/70)
- Attilio Ariosti (1666–1729)
- Pietro Aron (c.1480 – after 1545)
- Giovanni Artusi (c.1540–1613)
- Giammateo Asola (1532 or earlier –1609)
- Caterina Assandra (c.1590 – after 1618)
- Gennaro Astarita (c.1745/49–1805)
- Emanuele d'Astorga (1680–1757)
- Pietro Auletta (1698–1771)
- Giuseppe Avitrano (c.1670–1756)
- Filippo Azzaiolo (c.1530/40 – after 1570)

== B ==
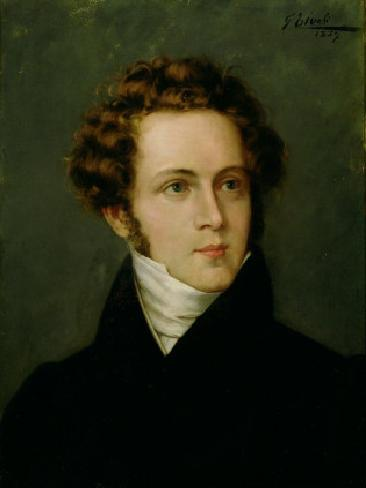
Vincenzo Bellini

- Ippolito Baccusi (c. 1550–1609)
- Rosa Giacinta Badalla (c. 1660 – c. 1710)
- Pietro Baldassare (c. 1683 – after 1768)
- Paolo Baltaro (born 1967)
- Adriano Banchieri (1568–1634)
- Banda Osiris (group, formed 1980)
- Emanuele Barbella (1718–1777)
- Giovanni de' Bardi (1534–1612)
- Sergio Bardotti (1939–2007)
- Leonora Baroni (1611–1670), daughter of Adriana Basile
- Francesco Barsanti (1690–1775)
- Girolamo Bartei (c. 1570 – c. 1618)
- Bartolino da Padova (fl. c. 1365 – c. 1405)
- Erasmo di Bartolo (1606–1656)
- Bartolomeo da Bologna (fl. 1405–1427)
- Bartolomeo degli Organi (1474–1539)
- Angelo Michele Bartolotti (died before 1682)
- Bruno Bartolozzi (1911–1980)
- Domenico Bartolucci (1917–2013), cardinal, director of Sistine Chapel Choir
- Pippo Barzizza (1902–1994)
- Giulio Bas (1874–1929)
- Adriana Basile (c. 1586 – c. 1650)
- Giovanni Battista Bassani (c. 1650–1716)
- Orazio Bassani (before 1570–1615), also Orazio della Viola
- Giovanni Bassano (c. 1561–1617)
- Franco Battiato (1945–2021)
- Giorgio Battistelli (born 1953)
- Leda Battisti (born 1971)
- Lucio Battisti (1943–1998)
- Antonio Bazzini (1818–1897)
- Giuseppe Becce (1877–1973)
- Gianni Bedori (1930–2005)
- Gianni Bella (born 1947)
- Lodovico Bellanda (c.1575 – after 1613)
- Vincenzo Bellavere (c.1540/41–1587)
- Domenico Belli (died 1627)
- Giulio Belli (c.1560 – 1621 or later)
- Vincenzo Bellini (1801–1835), famous for his opera Norma
- Antonia Bembo (c. 1640 – c. 1720)
- Pietro Paolo Bencini (c. 1670–1755)
- Cesare Bendinelli (c. 1542–1617)
- Marco I. Benevento (born 1978)
- Orazio Benevoli (1605–1672)
- Luciano Berio (1925–2003), wrote Sinfonia, Un re in ascolto, and Passaggio
- Ercole Bernabei (1622–1687)
- Stefano Bernardi (c.1577–1637)
- Marcello Bernardini (1730/40 – c. 1799)
- Andrea Bernasconi (c. 1706–1784)
- Antonio Bertali (1605–1669)
- Giuseppe Bertini (1759–1852)
- Mario Bertoncini (1932–2019)
- Ferdinando Bertoni (1725–1813)
- Carlo Besozzi (1738–1791)
- Girolamo Besozzi (c. 1745/50–1788)
- Marco Betta (born 1964)
- Bruno Bettinelli (1913–2004)
- Giovanni Bettini (fl. 1616 – c. 1624)
- Francesco Bianchi (1752–1810), also Giuseppe Francesco Bianchi
- Giovanni Bianchi (c. 1660 – after 1720)
- Giovanni Battista Bianchi (flourished 1675)
- Giovanni Battista Bianchi (flourished 1780–1782)
- Oscar Bianchi (born 1975), wrote Thanks to My Eyes
- Giovanni Battista Bianchini (after 1650–1708)
- Giancarlo Bigazzi (1940–2012)
- Umberto Bindi (1932–2002)
- Cesare Andrea Bixio (1896–1978)
- Felice Blangini (1781–1841)
- Luigi Boccherini (1743–1805)
- Andrea Bocelli (born 1958), co-writing credits include "Because We Believe" and "Perfect Symphony"
- Arrigo Boito (1842–1918), born Enrico Giuseppe Giovanni Boito
- Anna Bon (c.1739 – after 1767)
- Valerio Bona (c.1560 – c.1620)
- Giacinto Bondioli (1596–1636)
- Fred Bongusto (1935–2019)
- Laura Bono (born 1979)
- Antonio Maria Bononcini (1677–1726)
- Giovanni Bononcini (1670–1747)
- Giovanni Maria Bononcini (1642–1678), father of Giovanni and Antonio
- Francesco Antonio Bonporti (1672–1749)
- Pietro Borradori (born 1965)
- Costante Adolfo Bossi (1876–1953), brother of Marco Enrico Bossi
- Marco Enrico Bossi (1861–1925)
- Franciscus Bossinensis (fl. 1509–1511)
- Luigi Bottazzo (1845–1924)
- Cosimo Bottegari (1554–1620)
- Giovanni Bottesini (1821–1889)
- Giulio Cesare Brero (1908-1973)
- Giuseppe Antonio Brescianello (c. 1690–1758), also Bressonelli
- Antonio Brioschi (fl. c. 1725–1750)
- Riccardo Broschi (c. 1698–1756)
- Antonio Brunelli (1577–1630)
- Gaetano Brunetti (1744–1798)
- Elisabetta Brusa (born 1954)
- Valentino Bucchi (1916–1976)
- Giovanni Battista Buonamente (c. 1595–1642)
- Paolo Buonvino (born 1970)
- Ferruccio Busoni (1866–1924)
- Sylvano Bussotti (1931–2021)

== C ==
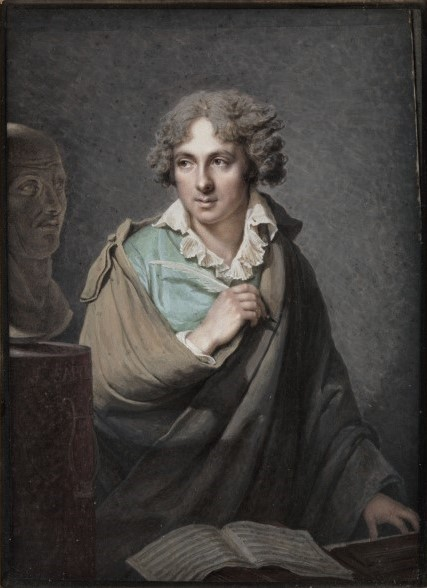
Luigi Cherubini

- Francesca Caccini (1587 – c. 1641), daughter of Giulio
- Giulio Caccini (1551–1618)
- Settimia Caccini (1591 – c. 1638), daughter of Giulio
- Pasquale Cafaro (1715–1787)
- Antonio Caldara (1670–1736)
- Giuseppe Cambini (c.1746 – c.1825)
- Bartolomeo Campagnoli (1751–1827)
- Fabio Campana (1819–1882)
- Bruno Canfora (1924–2017)
- Bruno Canino (born 1935)
- Enrico Cannio (1874–1949)
- Vincenzo Capirola (1474 – after 1548)
- Filippo Capocci (1840–1911)
- Gaetano Capocci (1811–1898)
- Claudio Capponi (born 1959)
- Matteo Capranica (1708 – c. 1776)
- Giovanni Paolo Capriolo (c. 1580 – c. 1627), also Caprioli
- Marchetto Cara (c. 1470 – c. 1525)
- Ezio Carabella (1891–1964)
- Michele Carafa (1787–1872)
- Matteo Carcassi (1792–1853)
- Salvatore Cardillo (1874–1947)
- Cristoforo Caresana (c.1640–1709)
- Giacomo Carissimi (1605–1674)
- Roberto Carnevale (born 1966)
- Renato Carosone (1920–2001)
- Fiorenzo Carpi (1918–1997)
- Ferdinando Carulli (1770–1841)
- Giuseppe Caruso (fl. 1634)
- Giuseppe "Pippo" Caruso (1935–2018)
- Claudio Casciolini (1697–1760)
- Alfredo Casella (1883–1947)
- Giulio Castagnoli (born 1958)
- Bellerofonte Castaldi (1580–1649)
- Dario Castello (c. 1590 – c. 1658)
- Mario Castelnuovo-Tedesco (1895–1968)
- Niccolò Castiglioni (1932–1996)
- Pietro Castrucci (1679–1752)
- Leonello Casucci (1885–1975)
- Maddalena Casulana (c. 1544 – c. 1590)
- Alfredo Catalani (1854–1893)
- Diomedes Cato (c. 1560/65 – after 1618)
- Emilio de' Cavalieri (1550–1602)
- Francesco Cavalli (1602–1676), born Pietro Francesco Caletti-Bruni
- Giuseppe Cavallo (died 1684)
- Girolamo Cavazzoni (c.1525 – after 1577)
- Marco Antonio Cavazzoni (c. 1490 – c. 1560)
- Maurizio Cazzati (1616–1678)
- Carlo Cecere (1706–1761)
- Adriano Celentano (born 1938)
- Bonaventura Cerronio (fl. 1639)
- Sulpitia Cesis (1577-?)
- Antonio Cesti (1623–1669)
- Ippolito Chamaterò (late 1530s – after 1592), also known as Chamatterò di Negri, Camaterò
- Fortunato Chelleri (1690–1757), also Keller, Kelleri, Kellery, Cheler
- Luigi Cherubini (1760–1842)
- Giancarlo Chiaramello (born 1939)
- Piero Ciampi (1934–1980)
- Cesare Ciardi (1818–1877)
- Alessandro Cicognini (1906–1995)
- Antonio Cifra (c.1584–1629)
- Francesco Cilea (1866–1950)
- Giovanni Paolo Cima (c.1570–1622)
- Domenico Cimarosa (1749–1801)
- Roberto Ciotti (1953–2013)
- Stelvio Cipriani (1937–2018)
- Giovanni Battista Cirri (1724–1808)
- Aldo Clementi (1925–2011)
- Muzio Clementi (1752–1832)
- Carlo Coccia (1782–1873)
- Lelio Colista (1629–1680)
- Giuseppe Colla (1731-1806)
- Giuseppe Colombi (1635–1694)
- Giovanni Paolo Colonna (1637–1695)
- Giuseppe Concone (1801–1861)
- Nicola Conforto (1718–1793)
- Fabius Constable (born 1973)
- Paolo Conte (born 1937)
- Francesco Bartolomeo Conti (1681/82–1732)
- Ubaldo Continiello (1941–2014)
- Francesco Corbetta (c.1615–1681)
- Arcangelo Corelli (1653–1713)
- Azio Corghi (1937–2022)
- Gaetano Coronaro (1852–1908)
- Giuseppe Corsi da Celano (1631/32–1691), also known as Celani
- Francesco Corteccia (1502–1571)
- Chiara Margarita Cozzolani (1602 – c.1676/78)
- Giovanni Croce (1557–1609)
- Toto Cutugno (1943–2023)

== D ==
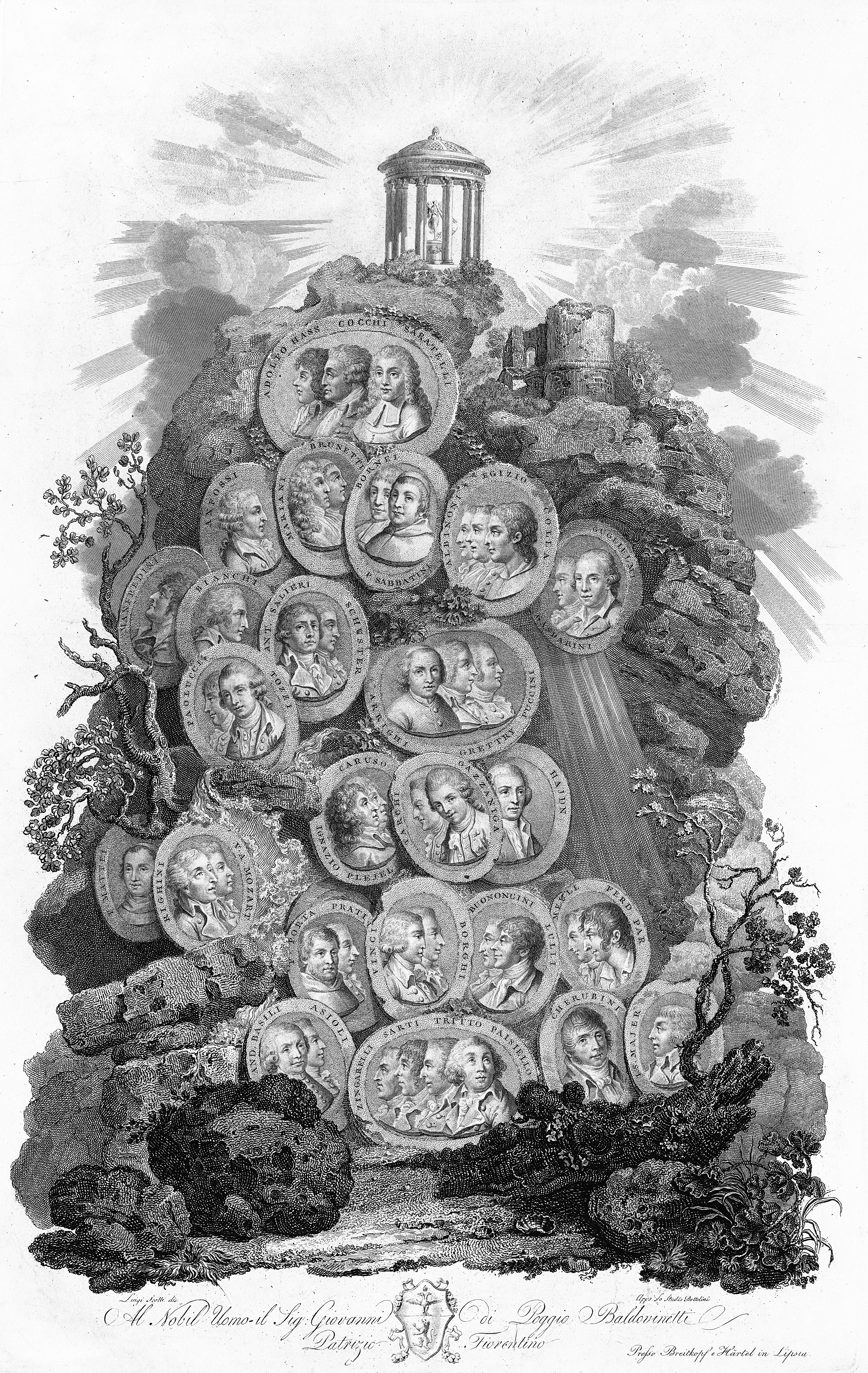
Tableau of Italian composers, c. 1790, by Pietro Bettelini (1763–1829)

- Luca D'Alberto (born 1983)
- Lucio Dalla (1943–2012)
- Evaristo Felice Dall'Abaco (1675–1742)
- Girolamo Dalla Casa (died 1601), also known as Hieronymo de Udene
- Luigi Dallapiccola (1904–1975), composer of Il prigioniero
- Marco Dall'Aquila (c. 1480 – after 1538)
- Domenico Dall'Oglio (c. 1700–1764)
- Joan Ambrosio Dalza (fl. 1508)
- Nino D'Angelo (born 1957)
- Pino Daniele (1955–2015)
- Giovanni D'Anzi (1906–1974)
- Nicola d'Arienzo (1842–1915)
- Padre Davide da Bergamo (1791–1863), born Felice Moretti
- Cecilia Dazzi (born 1969)
- Fabrizio De André (1940–1999)
- Guido De Angelis (born 1944)
- Maurizio De Angelis (born 1947), brother of Guido
- Anthony de Countie (died 1579)
- Ernesto De Curtis (1875–1937)
- Nicola De Giosa (1819–1885)
- Francesco de Layolle (or dell'Aiolle) (1492 – c. 1540)
- Riccardo Del Turco (born 1939)
- Fernando De Luca (born 1961)
- Francesco De Masi (1930–2005)
- Fabrizio Dentice (c. 1539 – c. 1581)
- Luigi Dentice (c. 1510–1566)
- Scipione Dentice (1560–1633), grandson of Luigi, nephew of Fabrizio
- Luigi Denza (1846–1922), Neapolitan song composer of Funiculì, Funiculà
- Manuel De Peppe (born 1970)
- Manuel De Sica (1949–2014)
- Christian De Walden (born 1946)
- Eduardo Di Capua (1865–1917)
- Girolamo Diruta (c. 1554 – after 1610)
- Salvatore Di Vittorio (born 1967)
- Pino Donaggio (born 1941)
- Baldassare Donato (1525/30–1603), also known as Donati
- Donato da Cascia (fl. c. 1350–1370)
- Franco Donatoni (1927–2000)
- Stefano Donaudy (1879–1925)
- Carlo Donida (1920–1998)
- Gaetano Donizetti (1797–1848), opera composer, known for Lucia di Lammermoor and L'elisir d'amore among others
- Girolamo Donnini (fl. 1719 - died 1752)
- Paolo Dossena (born 1942)
- Antonio Draghi (c. 1634–1700)
- Giovanni Battista Draghi (c. 1640–1708), not the later namesake known as Pergolesi
- Domenico Dragonetti (1763–1846)
- Egidio Duni (1708–1775)
- Francesco Durante (1684–1755)

== E ==
- Ludovico Einaudi (born 1955)
- Sergio Endrigo (1933–2005)
- Michele Esposito (1855–1929)
- Franco Evangelisti (1926–1980)

== F ==
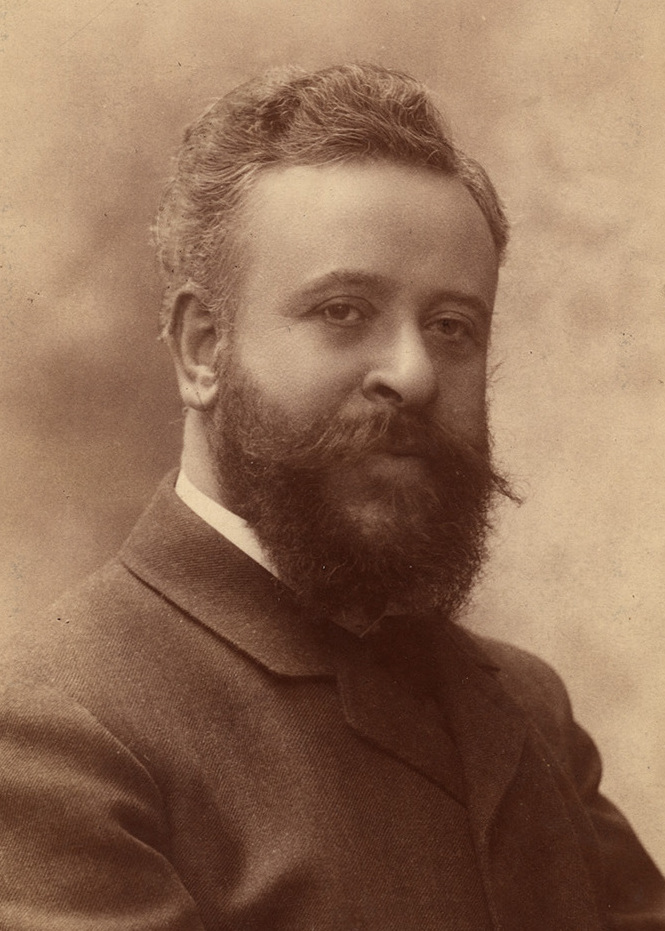
Alberto Franchetti

- Giovanni Matteo Faà di Bruno (fl. 1570)
- Franco Faccio (1840–1891)
- Giacomo Facco (1676–1753)
- Michelangelo Faggioli (1666–1733)
- Nicola Fago (1677–1745)
- Mirko Fait (born 1965)
- Michele de Falco (c. 1688 – after 1732)
- Andrea Falconieri (1585/86–1656), also known as Falconiero
- Michelangelo Falvetti (1642–1692)
- Guido Alberto Fano (1875–1961)
- Carlo Farina (c. 1600–1639)
- Giuseppe Farinelli (1769–1836), born Giuseppe Francesco Finco
- Giovanni Battista Fasolo (c. 1598 – after 1664)
- Alfio Fazio (born 1959)
- Ivan Fedele (born 1953)
- Fedele Fenaroli (1730–1818)
- Francesco Feo (1691–1761)
- Giuseppe Ferlendis (1755–1810)
- Alfonso Ferrabosco the elder (1543–1588)
- Domenico Ferrabosco (1513–1574)
- Giovanni Battista Ferrandini (c. 1710–1791)
- Benedetto Ferrari (c. 1603–1681)
- Carlotta Ferrari (1831–1907)
- Domenico Ferrari (1722–1780)
- Antonio Ferraro (c. 1592 – after 1629)
- Lorenzo Ferrero (born 1951)
- Gianni Ferrio (1924–2013)
- Costanzo Festa (c. 1485/90–1545)
- Sebastiano Festa (c. 1490/95–1524)
- Nico Fidenco (1933–2022), also known as Domenico Colarossi
- Francesco Filidei (born 1973)
- Gino Filippini (1900–1962)
- Giacomo Finetti (?–1630)
- Aldo Finzi (1897–1945)
- Valentino Fioravanti (1764–1837)
- Vincenzo Fioravanti (1799–1877), son of Valentino
- Nicola Fiorenza (after 1700 –1764)
- Ignazio Fiorillo (1715–1787)
- Matteo Fischetti (1830–1887)
- Pietro Floridia (1860–1932)
- Francesco Florimo (1800–1888)
- Antonio Florio (born 1956)
- Francesco Foggia (1603–1688)
- Giacomo Fogliano (1468–1548)
- Giovanni Battista Fontana (c. 1580/89 – c. 1630)
- Jimmy Fontana (1934–2013), born Enrico Sbriccoli
- Alfonso Fontanelli (1557–1622)
- Zucchero Fornaciari (born 1955)
- Alberto Fortis (born 1955)
- Giovanni Paolo Foscarini (c. 1600 – after 1649)
- Ivano Fossati (born 1951)
- Armando Fragna (1898–1972)
- Petronio Franceschini (1651–1680)
- Francesco Canova da Milano (1497–1543)
- Luca Francesconi (born 1956)
- Alberto Franchetti (1860–1942)
- Massimiliano Frani (born 1967)
- Vito Frazzi (1888–1975)
- Girolamo Frescobaldi (1583–1643), organist at St. Peter's Basilica and widely influential keyboard composer
- Fabio Frizzi (born 1951)
- Francesco Paolo Frontini (1860–1939)
- Martino Frontini (1827–1909)
- Adolfo Fumagalli (1828–1856), one of several composer brothers
- Disma Fumagalli (1826–1893), one of several composer brothers
- Luca Fumagalli (1837–1908), one of several composer brothers
- Polibio Fumagalli (1830–1900), one of several composer brothers
- Giovanni Fusco (1906–1968)

== G ==
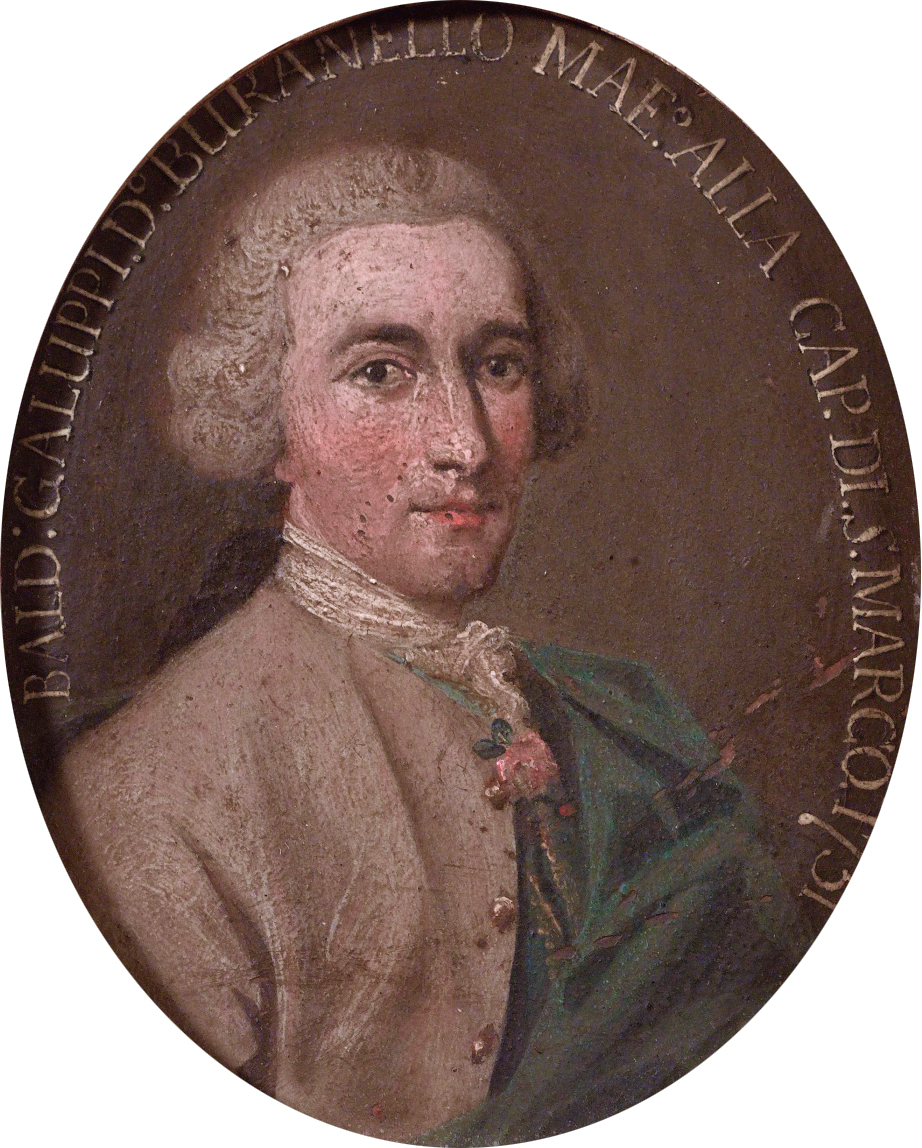
Baldassare Galuppi

- Michele Gabellone (1692–1740), also Cabalone, etc.
- Andrea Gabrieli (c. 1533–1585), uncle of Giovanni
- Giovanni Gabrieli (1557–1612), composer and organist
- Domenico Gabrielli (1651–1690)
- Franchinus Gaffurius (1451–1522), also Franchino Gaffurio
- Marco da Gagliano (1582–1643)
- Michelagnolo Galilei (1575–1631), brother of Galileo
- Vincenzo Galilei (c. 1520–1591), father of Galileo
- Giuseppe Galli (fl. 1598)
- Domenico Gallo (1730 – c. 1768)
- Giovanni Pietro Gallo (fl. 1591 – c. 1600)
- Baldassare Galuppi (1706–1785)
- Giuseppe Garibaldi (1819–1908), a younger namesake of Italy's founder
- Giuseppe Gariboldi (1833–1905)
- Carlo Giorgio Garofalo (1886–1962)
- Giorgio Gaslini (1929–2014)
- Francesco Gasparini (1661–1727)
- Quirino Gasparini (1721–1778)
- Giovanni Giacomo Gastoldi (c. 1554–1609)
- Luigi Gatti (1740–1817)
- Roberto Gatto (born 1958)
- Vittorio Gelmetti (1926–1992)
- Francesco Geminiani (1687–1762)
- Pietro Generali (1773–1832)
- Ignazio Gerusalemme (1707–1769)
- Carlo Gesualdo (1566–1613), chromatic madrigalist, nobleman, killer
- Giorgio Ghedini (1892–1965)
- Gherardello da Firenze (c. 1320/25 – 1362/63)
- Giuseppe Gherardeschi (1759–1815)
- Benedetto Ghiglia (1921–2012)
- Giovanni Ghizzolo (c. 1580 – c. 1625)
- Geminiano Giacomelli (1692–1740)
- Antonio Giannettini (1648–1721)
- Jacopo Gianninoto (born 1973)
- Bernardo Gianoncelli (died c. 1650)
- Felice Giardini (1716–1796)
- Remo Giazotto (1910–1998)
- Marcello Giombini (1928–2003)
- Carmine Giordani (c. 1685–1758)
- Giuseppe Giordani (1751–1798)
- Tommaso Giordani (c. 1730–1806)
- Umberto Giordano (1867–1948)
- Giovanni Giorgi (c. 1700–1762)
- Giovanni da Cascia (14th century)
- Giovannini (composer) (fl. 1740 – c. 1782)
- Pietro Antonio Giramo (fl. 1619 – c. 1630)
- Mauro Giuliani (1781–1829), virtuoso guitarist and composer
- Simone Giuliani (born 1973)
- Goblin (group, formed 1972), previously named Oliver and Cherry Five
- Franco Godi (born 1940)
- Roberto Goitre (1927–1980)
- Lallo Gori (1927–1982)
- Sandro Gorli (born 1948)
- Enzo Gragnaniello (born 1954)
- Giovanni Battista Granata (1620/21–1687)
- Alessandro Grandi (1586–1630)
- Gaetano Greco (c.1657 – c.1728)
- Lucio Gregoretti (born 1961)
- Giovanni Lorenzo Gregori (1663–1745)
- Giovanni Battista Grillo (late 16th century–1622)
- Niccolò Grillo (fl. 1720s)
- Carlo Grossi (c. 1634–1688)
- Gioseffo Guami (1542–1611)
- Emilia Gubitosi (1887–1972)
- Andrea Guerra (born 1961)
- Pietro Alessandro Guglielmi (1728–1804)
- Cesario Gussago (fl. 1599–1612)

== H ==
- Hoste da Reggio (c. 1520–1569), also known as L'Hoste, L'Osto, Oste, Bartolomeo Torresano

== I ==
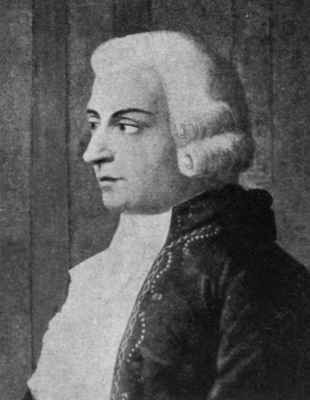
Giacomo Insanguine

- Sigismondo d'India (c. 1582–1629)
- Marc'Antonio Ingegneri (c. 1535/36–1592)
- Carlo Innocenzi (1899–1962)
- Giacomo Insanguine (1728–1793)
- Enrico Intra (born 1935)
- Paolo Isnardi (c. 1536–1596)
- Ivan Iusco (born 1970)

== J ==
- Giuseppe Maria Jacchini (1667–1727)
- Jacopo da Bologna (fl. 1340 – c. 1386)
- Enzo Jannacci (1935–2013)
- Giuseppe Jannacconi (1740–1816)
- Niccolò Jommelli (1714–1774)

== K ==
- Giovanni Girolamo Kapsperger (c. 1580–1651), also known as Johann(es) Hieronymus Kapsberger or Giovanni Geronimo Kapsperger
- Ernesto Köhler (1849–1907)
- Gorni Kramer (1913–1995)

== L ==
- Giovanni Battista Lampugnani (c. 1708–1786)
- Stefano Landi (c. 1586–1639)
- Carlo Alessandro Landini (born 1954)
- Francesco Landini (c. 1325/35–1397), also known as Landino, degli Organi, il Cieco, or da Firenze
- Salvatore Lanzetti (c. 1710 – c. 1780)
- Gaetano Latilla (1711–1788)
- Felice Lattuada (1882–1962)
- Bruno Lauzi (1937–2006)
- Angelo Francesco Lavagnino (1909–1987)
- Luigi Legnani (1790–1877)
- Giovanni Legrenzi (1626–1690)
- Stefano Lentini (born 1974)
- Leonardo Leo (1694–1744)
- Isabella Leonarda (1620–1704)
- Ruggiero Leoncavallo (1858–1919), composer of the tragic opera, Pagliacci
- Giovanni Battista Leonetti (fl. 1604 – c. 1617)
- Leone Leoni (c. 1560–1627)
- Giuseppe Liberto (born 1943)
- Francesco Libetta (born 1968)
- Alphonsus Maria de' Liguori (1696–1787), bishop, saint, composer of Tu scendi dalle stelle
- Giuseppe Lillo (1814–1863)
- Roberto Livraghi (born 1937)
- Mimmo Locasciulli (born 1949)
- Pietro Locatelli (1695–1764)
- Nicola Bonifacio Logroscino (1698 – c. 1765)
- Antonio Lolli (c. 1725–1802)
- Carlo Ambrogio Lonati (c. 1645 – c. 1712), also Lunati
- Alessandro Longo (1864–1945)
- Paolo Lorenzani (1640–1713)
- Lorenzo da Firenze (d. 1372/73)
- Antonio Lotti (1667–1740)
- Andrea Lo Vecchio (1942–2021)
- Andrea Luchesi (1741–1801)
- Giovanni Lorenzo Lulier (c. 1662–1700), nicknamed Giovannino del Violone (Little John of the Violin)
- Jean-Baptiste Lully (1632–1687), born Giovanni Battista Lulli
- Filippo de Lurano (c. 1475 – after 1520), also known as Luprano, Lorano
- Luzzasco Luzzaschi (c. 1545–1607)

== M ==
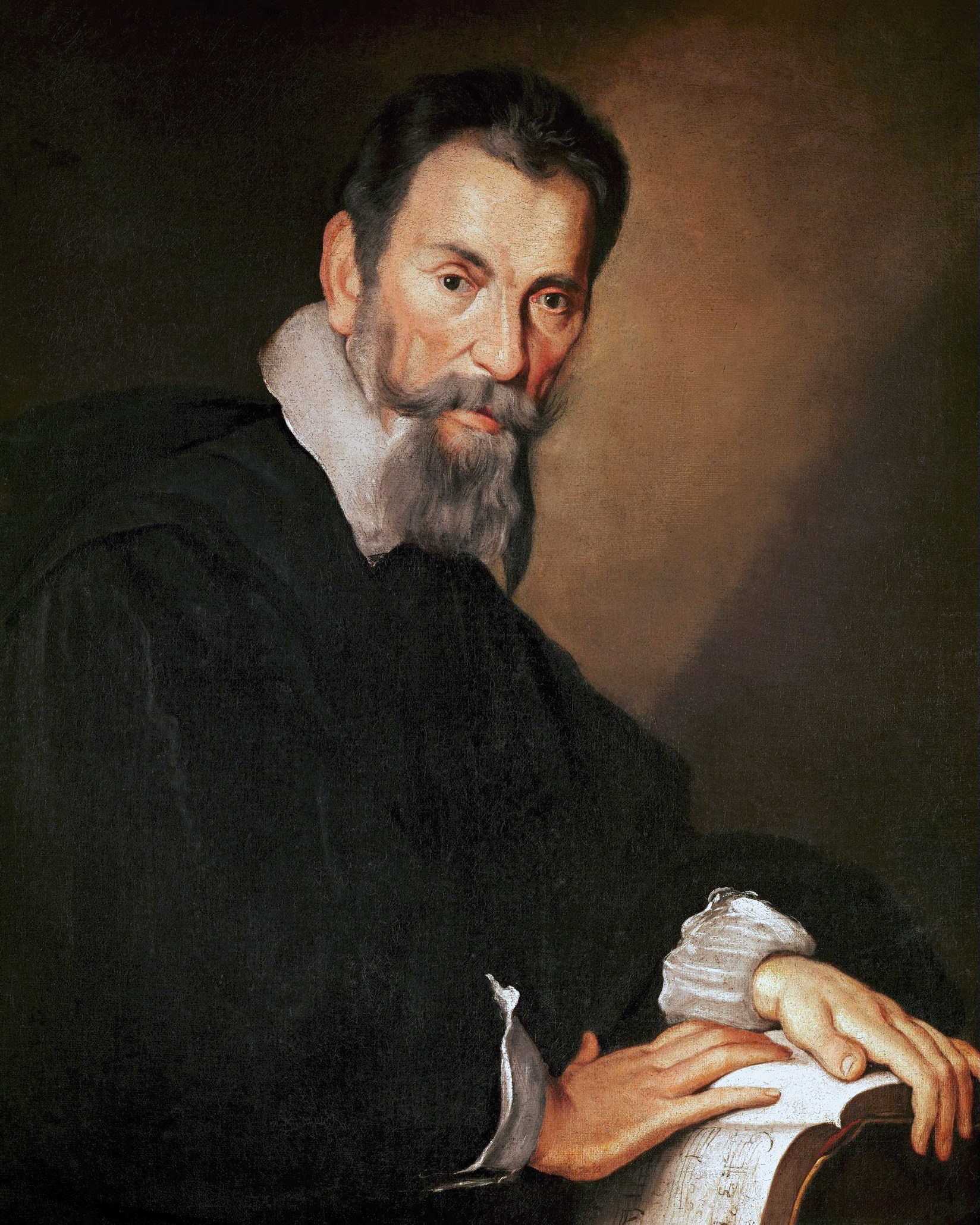
Claudio Monteverdi

- Teodulo Mabellini (1817–1897)
- Bruno Maderna (1920–1973), composer of Satyricon (opera)
- Enrico Mainardi (1897–1976)
- Giorgio Mainerio (c.1530/40–1582)
- Stefano Mainetti (born 1957)
- Gian Francesco de Majo (1732–1770)
- Giuseppe de Majo (1697–1771)
- Maurizio Malagnini (born c. 1984)
- Enzo Malepasso (1954–2009)
- Gian Francesco Malipiero (1882–1973)
- Riccardo Malipiero (1914–2003)
- Cristofano Malvezzi (1547–1599)
- Luigi Mancinelli (1848–1921)
- Francesco Mancini (1672–1737)
- Francesco Manelli (c. 1595–1667)
- Francesco Manfredini (1684–1762)
- Vincenzo Manfredini (1737–1799)
- Nicola Antonio Manfroce (1791–1813)
- Giuseppe Mango (1954–2014)
- Gennaro Manna (1715–1779)
- Carlo Mannelli (1640–1697)
- Franco Mannino (1924–2005)
- Alessandro Marcello (1669–1747), composer of the famous Oboe Concerto in D minor
- Benedetto Marcello (1686–1739), brother of Alessandro
- Fermo Dante Marchetti (1876–1940)
- Gianni Marchetti (1933–2012)
- Lele Marchitelli (born 1955)
- Giovanni Marciani (c. 1605 – c. 1663)
- Rita Marcotulli (born 1959)
- Luca Marenzio (c. 1553–1599), composer of approximately 500 madrigals
- Dario Marianelli (born 1963)
- Detto Mariano (1937–2020)
- Marco Marinangeli (born 1965)
- Biagio Marini (1594–1663)
- Gino Marinuzzi (1882–1945)
- E. A. Mario (1884–1961), born Giovanni Gaeta
- Augusto Martelli (1940–2014)
- Enrico Martinelli (1852–1922)
- Giulio Cesare Martinengo (c. 1564/68–1613)
- Giovanni Battista Martini (1706–1784)
- Giuseppe Martucci (1856–1909)
- Pietro Mascagni (1863–1945), opera composer, known for Cavalleria rusticana
- Michele Mascitti (1664–1760)
- Tiburtio Massaino (before 1550 – after 1608), also Massaini and Tiburzio
- Pino Massara (1931–2013)
- Domenico Massenzio (1586–1657)
- Tito Mattei (1839–1914)
- Nicola Matteis (fl. c. 1670 – after 1714), also Matheis
- Matteo da Perugia (fl. 1400–1416)
- Claudio Mattone (born 1943)
- Ascanio Mayone (c. 1565–1627)
- Gianni Mazza (born 1944)
- Domenico Mazzocchi (1592–1665)
- Virgilio Mazzocchi (1597–1646), brother of Domenico
- Antonio Maria Mazzoni (1717–1785)
- Giuseppe Mazza (1806–1885)
- Giovanni Mazzuoli (c. 1360–1426)
- Alessandro Melani (1639–1703)
- Gian Carlo Menotti (1911–2007)
- Saverio Mercadante (1795–1870)
- Tarquinio Merula (1595–1665)
- Claudio Merulo (1533–1604)
- Franco Micalizzi (born 1939)
- Giorgio Miceli (1836–1895)
- Amedeo Minghi (born 1947)
- Ambrogio Minoja (1752–1825)
- Domenico Modugno (1928–1994)
- Simone Molinaro (c. 1565–1615)
- Francesco Molino (1775–1847), also known as François Molino
- David Monacchi (born 1970)
- Antonio Montanari (1676–1737)
- Lodovico Monte
- Claudio Monteverdi (1567–1643), best known for his pioneering opera Orfeo
- Gaetano Monti (c. 1750 – c. 1816)
- Vittorio Monti (1868–1922)
- Carlo Ignazio Monza (c. 1680–1739)
- Giovanni Morandi (1777–1856)
- Giovanni Moretti (1807–1884)
- Guido Morini (born 1959)
- Francesco Morlacchi (1784–1841)
- Luigi Morleo (born 1970)
- Giorgio Moroder (born 1940), pop songwriter with three Academy Awards and four Grammy Awards
- Andrea Morricone (born 1964), film composer, son of Ennio
- Ennio Morricone (1928–2020), prolific film composer with two Academy Awards and four Grammy Awards
- Virgilio Mortari (1902–1993)
- Luigi Mosca (1775–1824)
- Giovanni Mossi (c. 1680?–1742)
- Emilio Munda (born 1982)

== N ==
- Giovanni Bernardino Nanino (c. 1560–1623)
- Giovanni Maria Nanino (1543/44–1607), also Nanini
- Gianna Nannini (born 1954)
- Pietro Nardini (1722–1793)
- Mario Nascimbene (1913–2002)
- Mariella Nava (born 1960)
- Marcantonio Negri (?–1624)
- Giovanni Cesare Netti (1649–1686)
- Niccolò da Perugia (later 14th century)
- Bruno Nicolai (1926–1991)
- Giuseppe Nicolini (1762–1842)
- Riccardo Nielsen (1908–1982)
- Piero Niro (born 1957)
- Giovanni Domenico da Nola (c. 1510/20–1592), also known as Nolla
- Luigi Nono (1924–1990)
- Michele Novaro (1818–1885), composed national anthem of the current Italian Republic
- Emanuele Nutile (1862–1932)

== O ==
- Angelo Olivieri (c. 1636–1715)
- Giuseppe Olivieri (fl. 1617 – c. 1623)
- Nino Oliviero (1918–1980)
- Giacomo Orefice (1865–1922)
- Ferdinando Orlandi (1774–1848)
- Nora Orlandi (born 1933)
- Alessandro Orologio (1550–1633)
- Riz Ortolani (1926–2014)

== P ==
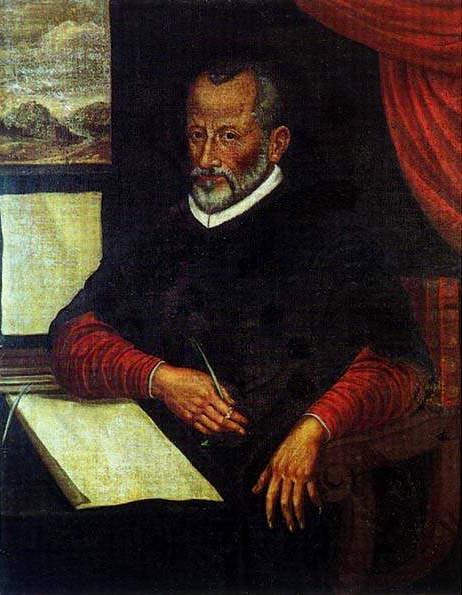
Giovanni Palestrina

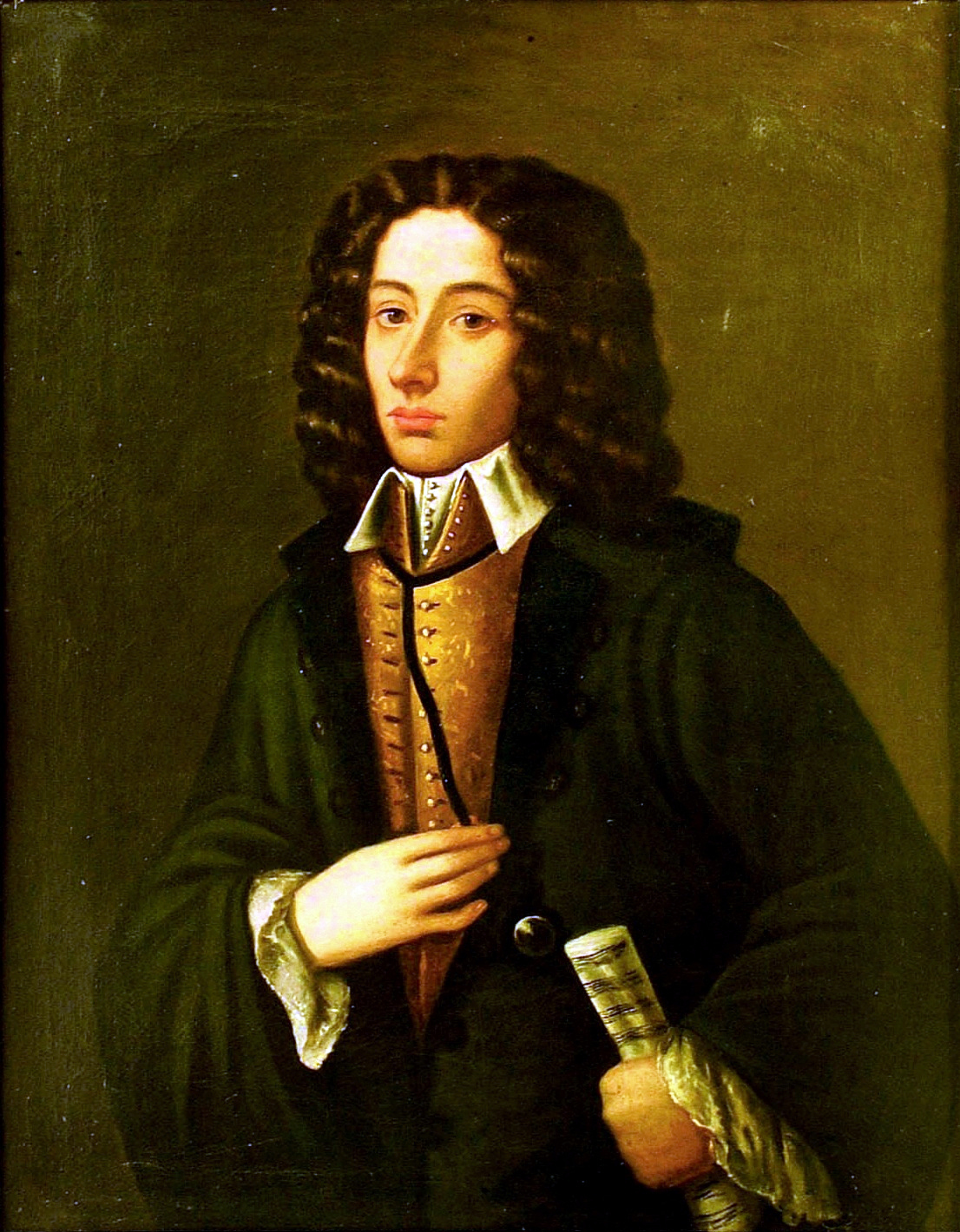
Giovanni Battista Pergolesi

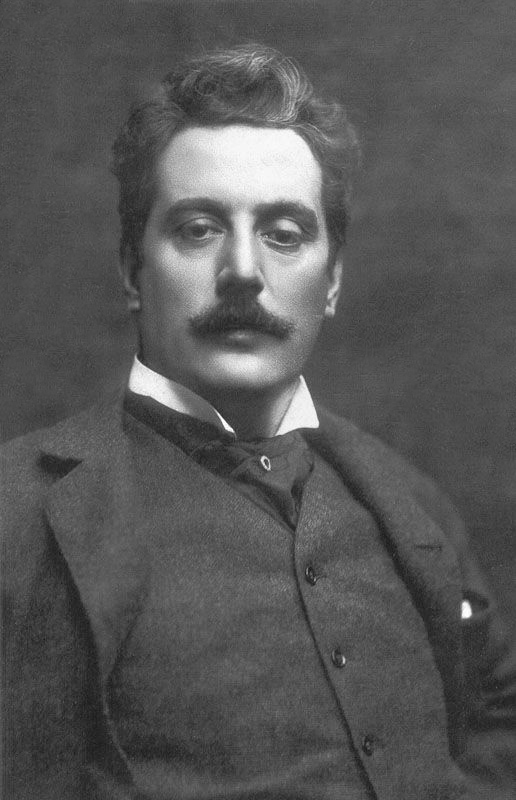
Giacomo Puccini

- Antonio Maria Pacchioni (1654–1738)
- Giorgio Pacchioni (born 1947)
- Daniele Pace (1935–1985)
- Roy Paci (born 1969)
- Pacifico (born 1964), stage name of Luigi De Crescenzo
- Giovanni Pacini (1796–1867)
- Annibale Padovano (1527–1575)
- Ferdinando Paer (1771–1839)
- Niccolò Paganini (1782–1840), virtuoso violinist and composer, wrote the 24 Caprices for violin
- Giovanni Paisiello (1740–1816)
- Giovanni Pierluigi da Palestrina (c.1525–1594), Renaissance master of polyphonic church music
- Benedetto Pallavicino (c.1551–1601)
- Antonio Pampani (1706–1775)
- Giovanni Antonio Pandolfi [Mealli] (1624 – c. 1687)
- Paolo Pandolfo (born 1964)
- Gino Paoli (1934–2026)
- Paolo da Firenze (c.1355 – c.1436)
- Girolamo Parabosco (c. 1524–1557)
- Pietro Domenico Paradisi (1707–1791)
- Susanna Parigi (born 1961)
- Antonio Pasculli (1842–1924)
- Bernardo Pasquini (1637–1710)
- Carlo Pedini (born 1956)
- Teodorico Pedrini (1671–1746)
- Arrigo Pedrollo (1878–1964)
- Carlo Pedrotti (1817–1893)
- Danilo Pennone (born 1963)
- Peppino di Capri (born 1939), born Giuseppe Faiella
- Davide Perez (1711–1778)
- Giovanni Battista Pergolesi (1710–1736), born Giovanni Battista Draghi
- Achille Peri (1812–1880)
- Jacopo Peri (1561–1633), composer of the first opera (Dafne) and first surviving opera (Euridice)
- Lorenzo Perosi (1872–1956)
- Marziano Perosi (1875–1959), brother of Lorenzo
- Giacomo Antonio Perti (1661–1756)
- Maria Xaveria Perucona (c. 1652 – after 1709), also Parruccona
- Giovanni Battista Pescetti (c.1704–1766)
- Michele Pesenti (c.1470 – after 1524)
- Alberto Pestalozza (1851–1934)
- Goffredo Petrassi (1904–2003)
- Giuseppe Petrini
- Pietro Pettoletti (c. 1795 – c. 1870)
- Max Pezzali (born 1967)
- Riccardo Piacentini (born 1958)
- Carlo Alfredo Piatti (1822–1901)
- Giovanni Picchi (1571/72–1643)
- Alessandro Piccinini (1566 – c. 1638)
- Niccolò Piccinni (1728–1800)
- Piero Piccioni (1921–2004)
- Riccardo Pick-Mangiagalli (1882–1949)
- Maestro Piero (before 1300 – c. 1350)
- Franco Piersanti (born 1950)
- Giuseppe Pietri (1886–1946)
- Giusto Pio (1926–2017)
- Nicola Piovani (born 1946)
- Bernardo Pisano (1490–1548)
- Berto Pisano (1928–2002)
- Franco Pisano (1922–1977), brother of Berto
- Giuseppe Ottavio Pitoni (1657–1743)
- Francesco Piu (born 1981)
- Ildebrando Pizzetti (1880–1968), opera composer best known for Assassinio nella cattedrale
- Emilio Pizzi (1861–1940)
- Maria Luigia Pizzoli (1817–1838)
- Pietro Platania (1828–1907)
- Giovanni Benedetto Platti (c.1697–1763)
- Gianfranco Plenizio (1941–2017)
- Alessandro Poglietti (early 17th century–1683)
- Pier Paolo Polcari (born 1969)
- Amilcare Ponchielli (1834–1886), Romantic opera composer known for La Gioconda
- Nicola Porpora (1686–1768), Baroque opera composer
- Giuseppe Porsile (1680–1750)
- Costanzo Porta (1528/29–1601)
- Giovanni Porta (c. 1675–1755)
- Gasparo Pratoneri (fl. 1556/59), nicknamed Spirito da Reggio
- Luca Antonio Predieri (1688–1767)
- Roberto Pregadio (1928–2010)
- Pino Presti (born 1943)
- Paola Prestini (born 1975)
- Giovanni Priuli (c. 1575–1626)
- Marieta Morosina Priuli (fl. 1665)
- Roberto Procaccini (born 1971)
- Teresa Procaccini (born 1934)
- Ignazio Prota (1690–1748)
- Francesco Provenzale (1624–1704)
- Oscar Prudente (born 1944)
- Domenico Puccini (1772–1815), grandson and grandfather of namesake composers Giacomo Puccini
- Giacomo Puccini (1858–1924), late Romantic opera composer (La bohème, Tosca, Turandot, Madama Butterfly)
- Giacomo Puccini (senior) (1712–1781), great-great-grandfather of namesake opera composer
- Gaetano Pugnani (1731–1798)

== Q ==
- Paolo Quagliati (c. 1555–1628)
- Lucia Quinciani (c. 1566, fl. 1611)

== R ==
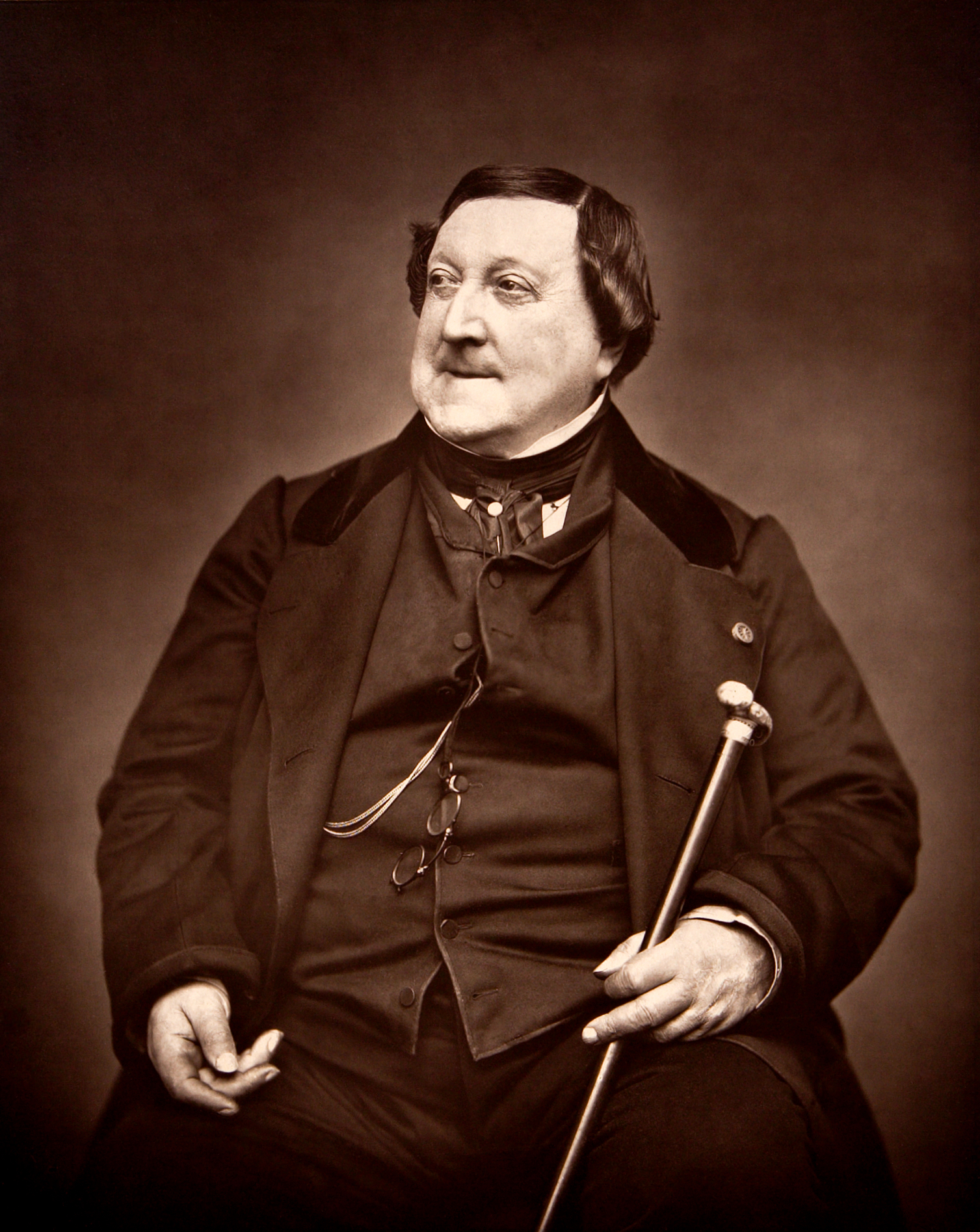
Gioachino Rossini

- Pietro Raimondi (1786–1853)
- Giacomo Rampini (1680–1760), and namesake nephew (d. 1811)
- Matteo Rampollini (1497–1553)
- Virgilio Ranzato (1883–1937)
- Renato Rascel (1912–1991)
- Oreste Ravanello (1871–1938)
- Gino Redi (1908–1962), born Luigi Pulci, also credited as P.G. Redi
- Licinio Refice (1883–1954)
- Tony Renis (born 1938), born Elio Cesari
- Paolo Renosto (1935–1988)
- Elsa Respighi (1894–1996), born Elsa Olivieri-Sangiacomo, wife of Ottorino
- Ottorino Respighi (1879–1936), known for his symphonic poems The Fountains of Rome and The Pines of Rome
- Gian Franco Reverberi (born 1934)
- Gian Piero Reverberi (born 1939), brother of Gian Franco
- Giovanni Battista Riccio (late 16th century – after 1621), also known as Giambattista Riccio
- Vittorio Rieti (1898–1994), composer of Barabau
- Giovanni Antonio Rigatti (c. 1613–1648)
- Rinaldo di Capua (c.1705 – c.1780)
- Giovanni Alberto Ristori (1692–1753)
- Andrea Rocca (born 1969)
- Rocco Rodio (c.1535 – after 1615)
- Francesco Rognoni (late 16th century – after 1626), son of Riccardo
- Riccardo Rognoni (c.1550 – before 1620), also Richardo Rogniono
- Alessandro Rolla (1757–1841)
- Antonio Rolla (1798–1837), born Giuseppe Antonio Rolla, son of Alessandro
- Alessandro Romano (1533–1592)
- Fausto Romitelli (1963–2004)
- Lucia Ronchetti (born 1963)
- Stefano Ronchetti-Monteviti (1814–1882)
- Renzo Rossellini (1908–1982)
- Camilla de Rossi (fl. 1707–1710)
- Giuseppe de Rossi (born mid 17th-century - died c. 1719-1720)
- Giovanni Rossi (1828–1886)
- Giovanni Battista Rossi (fl. 1585 – c. 1628)
- Giovanni Maria de Rossi (c. 1522–1590)
- Luigi Rossi (c.1597–1653)
- Michelangelo Rossi (1601/02–1656)
- Salamone Rossi (c.1570–1630)
- Gioachino Rossini (1792–1868), best known for The Barber of Seville and overtures to other operas such as William Tell
- Nino Rota (1911–1979)
- Antonio Rotta (c. 1495–1549)
- Giovanni Rovetta (1596–1668)
- Francesco Rovigo (1540/41–1597)
- Ernesto Rubin de Cervin (1936–2013)
- Bonaventura Rubino (c.1600–1668)
- Vincenzo Ruffo (c.1508–1587)
- Claudia Rusca (1593–1676)
- Giacomo Rust (1741–1786), also Rusti
- Paolo Rustichelli (born 1953)
- Giovanni Marco Rutini (1723–1797)
- Renzo Vitale - Italian composer

== S ==
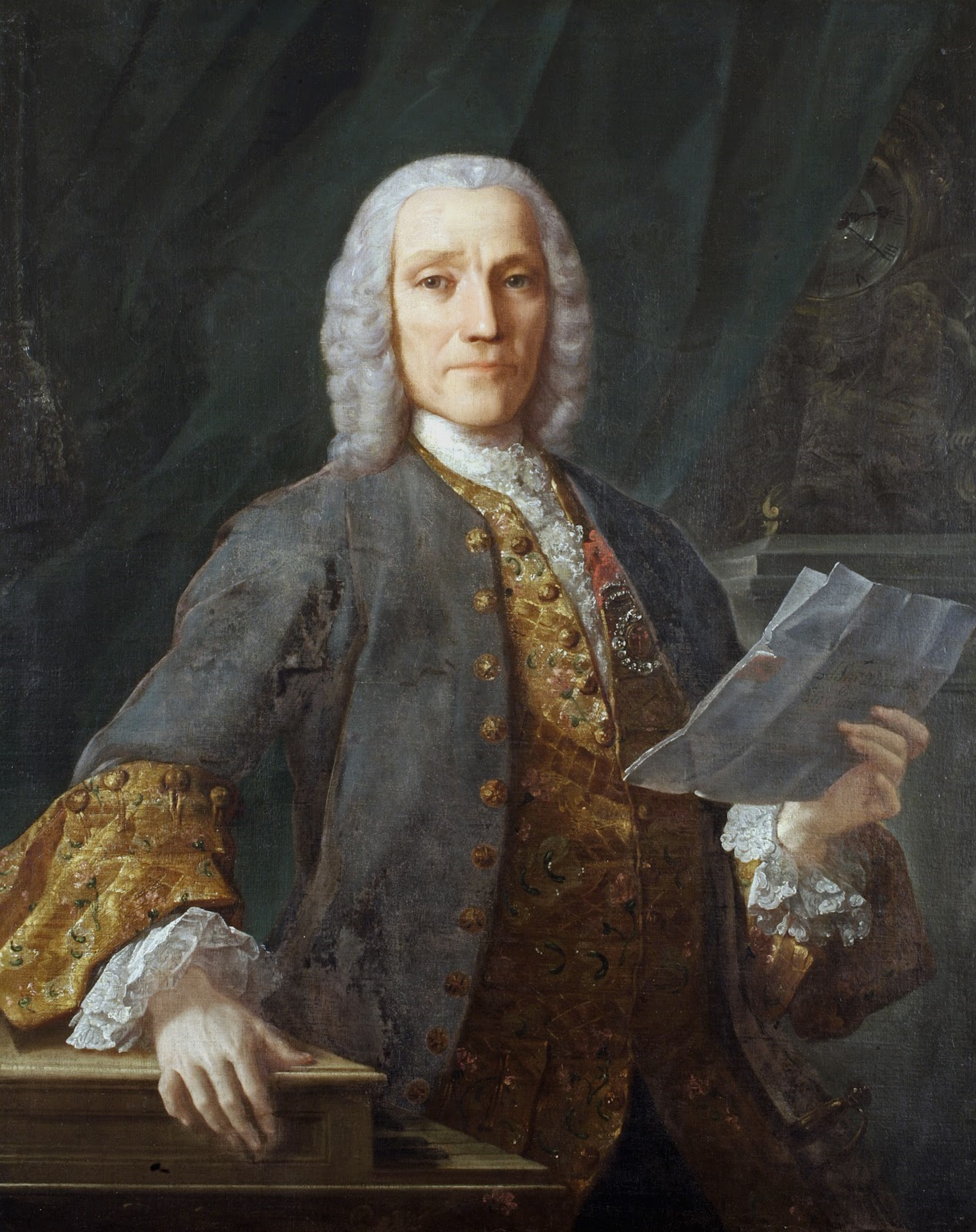
Domenico Scarlatti

- Victor de Sabata (1892–1967)
- Nicola Sabatino (1705–1796)
- Nicola Sabini (c. 1675 – 1705)
- Antonio Sabino (1591–1650)
- Francesco Sabino (1620–?)
- Giovanni Maria Sabino (1588–1649)
- Antonio Sacchini (1730–1786)
- Nicola Sala (1713–1801)
- Antonio Salieri (1750–1825)
- Giovanni Salvatore (c.1620 – c.1688)
- Giovanni Battista Sammartini (c.1700–1775)
- Giuseppe Sammartini (1695–1750)
- Giovanni Felice Sances (c. 1600–1679), also known as Sancies, Sanci, Sanes, Sanchez
- Antonia Sarcina (born 1963)
- Domenico Sarro (1679–1744)
- Giuseppe Sarti (1729–1802)
- Francesco Sartori (born 1957)
- Antonio Sartorio (1630–1680)
- Carlo Savina (1919–2002)
- Virgilio Savona (1919–2009)
- Rosario Scalero (1870–1954), also Natale Rosario Scalero
- Antonio Scandello (1517–1580)
- Giuseppe Scarani (fl. 1628 - fl. 1642)
- Alessandro Scarlatti (1660–1725), father of Pietro and Domenico, brother of Francesco, uncle or grand-uncle of Giuseppe
- Domenico Scarlatti (1685–1757), influential in the development of the Classical style
- Francesco Scarlatti (1666 – c. 1741)
- Giuseppe Scarlatti (1718/23–1777)
- Pietro Filippo Scarlatti (1679–1750)
- Giacinto Scelsi (1905–1988)
- Salvatore Sciarrino (born 1947)
- Flavio Emilio Scogna (born 1956)
- Giovanni Maria Scorzuto (fl. 1625 – c. 1636)
- Giulio Segni (1498–1561), also Julio Segni or Julio da Modena
- Nello Segurini (1910–1988)
- Giuseppe Sellitti (1700–1777), also Sellitto
- Kristian Sensini (born 1976)
- Pierangelo Sequeri (born 1944)
- Renato Serio (born 1946)
- Paolo Serrao (1830–1907)
- Claudia Sessa (c. 1570 – c. 1617/19)
- Giovanni Sgambati (1841–1914)
- Louis Siciliano (born 1975), also ALUEI
- Carlo Siliotto (born 1950)
- Achille Simonetti (1857–1928), violinist and composer
- Claudio Simonetti (born 1952)
- Enrico Simonetti (1924–1978), father of Claudio
- Leone Sinigaglia (1868–1944)
- Giuseppe Sinopoli (1946–2001)
- Maddalena Laura Sirmen (1745–1818), born Maddalena Laura Lombardini
- Camillo Sivori (1815–1894), also Ernesto Camillo Sivori
- Umberto Smaila (born 1950)
- Roberto Soffici (born 1946)
- Giovanni Sollima (born 1962)
- Giovanni Battista Somis (1686–1763), violinist and composer, brother of Lorenzo
- Francesco Soriano (1548/49–1621)
- Vincenzo Spampinato (born 1953)
- Francesco Spinacino (fl. 1507)
- Gaspare Spontini (1774–1851)
- Annibale Stabile (c.1535–1595), Roman School composer, pupil of Palestrina
- Agostino Steffani (1653–1728)
- Scipione Stella (1558/59–1622)
- Bernardo Storace (fl. 1664)
- Alessandro Stradella (1639–1682)
- Feliciano Strepponi (1797–1832), opera composer, father of Giuseppina Strepponi
- Alessandro Striggio (c. 1536/37–1592)
- Marco Stroppa (born 1959)
- Barbara Strozzi (1619–1677)

== T ==
- Giuseppe Tartini (1692–1770), famous for the Devil's Trill Sonata
- Pierantonio Tasca (1858–1934)
- Giuliano Taviani (born 1969)
- Giovanni Tebaldini (1864–1952)
- Vince Tempera (born 1946)
- Luigi Tenco (1938–1967)
- Carlo Tessarini (1690–1766)
- Giovanni Angelo Testagrossa (1470–1530)
- Camillo Togni (1922–1993)
- Luigi Tomasini (1741–1808)
- Andrea Tonoli (Born 1991)
- Giuseppe Torelli (1658–1709)
- Pietro Torri (c. 1650–1737)
- Giuseppe Felice Tosi (1619–1693)
- Pier Francesco Tosi (1653/54–1732)
- Paolo Tosti (1846–1916)
- Antonio Tozzi (1736–1812)
- Umberto Tozzi (born 1952)
- Giovanni Maria Trabaci (c. 1575–1647)
- Tommaso Traetta (1727–1779)
- Giuseppe Tricarico (1623–1697)
- Giacomo Tritto (1733–1824)
- Ascanio Trombetti (1544-1590)
- Bartolomeo Tromboncino (c. 1470 – c. 1535), trombonist, frottolist, murderer
- Armando Trovajoli (1917–2013)
- Gerardina Trovato (born 1967)
- Francesco Turini (c. 1595–1656)

== U ==
- Marco Uccellini (1603/10–1680)
- Vincenzo Ugolini (c. 1580–1638)
- Piero Umiliani (1926–2001)
- Francesco Antonio Urio (1631/32 – c. 1719)
- Gennaro Ursino (1650–1715)
- Francesco Usper (or Sponga) (1561–1641)
- Teo Usuelli (1920–2009)
- Francesco Uttini (1723–1795)

== V ==
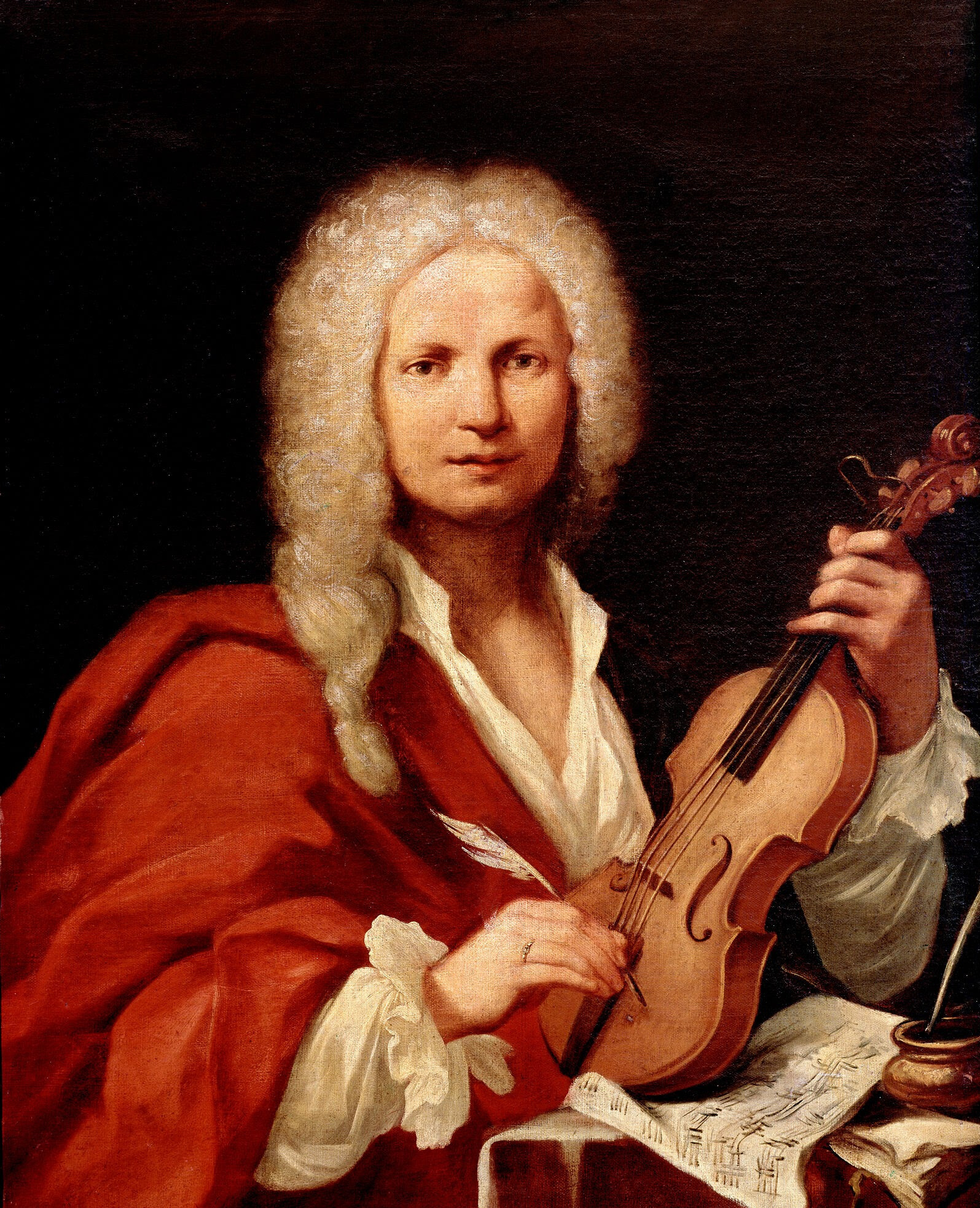
Antonio Vivaldi

- Nicola Vaccai (1790–1848), also Vaccaj
- Antonio Valente (fl. 1565–80)
- Giovanni Valentini (c. 1582–1649)
- Giovanni Valentini (c. 1750–1804)
- Giuseppe Valentini (1681–1753)
- Celso Valli (born 1950)
- Francesco Antonio Vallotti (1697–1780)
- Ivan Vandor (1932–2020)
- Orazio Vecchi (1550–1605)
- Gaetano Veneziano (1665–1716)
- Antonio Veracini (1659–1733)
- Francesco Maria Veracini (1690–1768)
- Giuseppe Verdi (1813–1901), opera composer best known for Rigoletto, Nabucco, Aida and La traviata
- Lodovico Grossi da Viadana (c. 1560–1627)
- Edoardo Vianello (born 1938)
- Nicola Vicentino (1511–1575/76)
- Vincenzo da Rimini (14th century)
- Leonardo Vinci (1690–1730)
- Francesco dalla Viola (died 1568)
- Giovanni Viotti (1755–1824), Classical era violin teacher whose music was later praised by Brahms
- Carlo Virzì (born 1972)
- Giovanni Battista Vitali (1632–1692)
- Tomaso Antonio Vitali (1663–1745)
- Franco Vittadini (1884–1948)
- Antonio Vivaldi (1678–1741), wrote over 600 concerti, including The Four Seasons
- Giovanni Buonaventura Viviani (1638 – c. 1693)
- Lucrezia Orsina Vizzana (1590–1662)
- Roman Vlad (1919–2013), Italian composer, pianist, and musicologist of Romanian birth

== W ==
- Nicola van Westerhout (1857–1898)
- Ermanno Wolf-Ferrari (1876–1948)

== Y ==
- Pietro Yon (1886–1943)

== Z ==
- Antonio Zacara da Teramo (1350/60 – 1413/16)
- Lodovico Zacconi (1555–1627)
- Nicolaus Zacharie (c. 1400 – 1466)
- Mario Zafred (1922–1987)
- Giovanni Zamboni (c. 1664 – c. 1721)
- Bruno Zambrini (born 1935)
- Aidan Zammit (born 1965)
- Riccardo Zandonai (1883–1944)
- Gasparo Zanetti (c. 1600–1660)
- Andrea Zani (1696–1757)
- Uberto Zanolli (1917–1994)
- Gioseffo Zarlino (1517–1590)
- Lorenzo Zavateri (1690–1764)
- Marc'Antonio Ziani (c. 1653–1715)
- Pietro Andrea Ziani (1616–1684)
- Niccolò Antonio Zingarelli (1752–1837)
- Domenico Zipoli (1688–1726)
- Matteo Zocarini (fl. 1740)
- Carlo Zuccari (1703–1792)
- Diego Zucchinetti (18th century)
- Guglielmo Zuelli (1859–1941]
