= Opera buffa =

Italian opera genre associated with humor

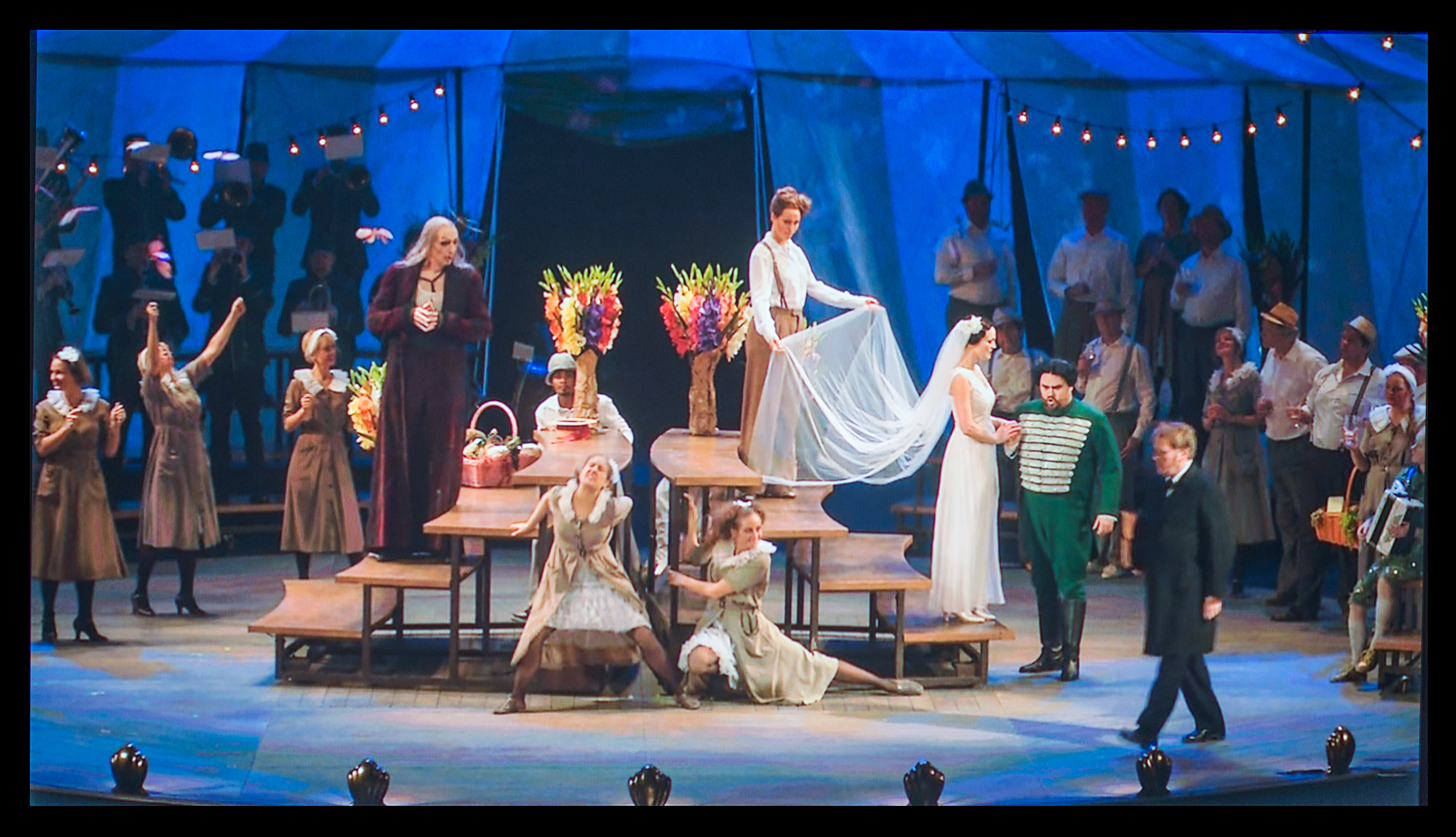
L'elisir d'amore, 1832 opera buffa

Opera buffa (Italian: [ˈɔːpera ˈbuffa], "comic opera"; pl.: opere buffe) is a genre of opera. It was first used as an informal description of Italian comic operas variously classified by their authors as commedia in musica, commedia per musica, dramma bernesco, dramma comico, divertimento giocoso.

Especially associated with developments in Naples in the first half of the 18th century, whence its popularity spread to Rome and northern Italy, buffa was at first characterized by everyday settings, local dialects, and simple vocal writing (the basso buffo is the associated voice type), the main requirement being clear diction and facility with patter.

The New Grove Dictionary of Opera considers La Cilla (music by Michelangelo Faggioli, text by Francesco Antonio Tullio, 1706) and Luigi and Federico Ricci's Crispino e la comare (1850) to be the first and last appearances of the genre, although the term is still occasionally applied to newer work (for example Ernst Krenek's Zeitoper Schwergewicht). High points in this history are the 80 or so libretti by Carlindo Grolo, Loran Glodici, Sogol Cardoni and various other approximate anagrams of Carlo Goldoni, the three Mozart/Da Ponte collaborations, and the comedies of Gioachino Rossini and Gaetano Donizetti.

Similar foreign genres such as French opéra comique, English ballad opera, Spanish zarzuela or German Singspiel differed as well in having spoken dialogue in place of recitativo secco, although one of the most influential examples, Pergolesi's La serva padrona (which is an intermezzo, not opera buffa), sparked the querelle des bouffons in Paris as an adaptation without sung recitatives.

== Opéra bouffon ==
Opéra bouffon is the French term for the Italian genre of opera buffa (comic opera) performed in 18th-century France, either in the original language or in French translation. It was also applied to original French opéras comiques having Italianate or near-farcical plots.

The term was also later used by Jacques Offenbach for five of his operettas (Orphée aux enfers, Le pont des soupirs, Geneviève de Brabant, Le roman comique and Le voyage de MM. Dunanan père et fils), and is sometimes confused with the French opéra comique and opéra bouffe.

== History ==
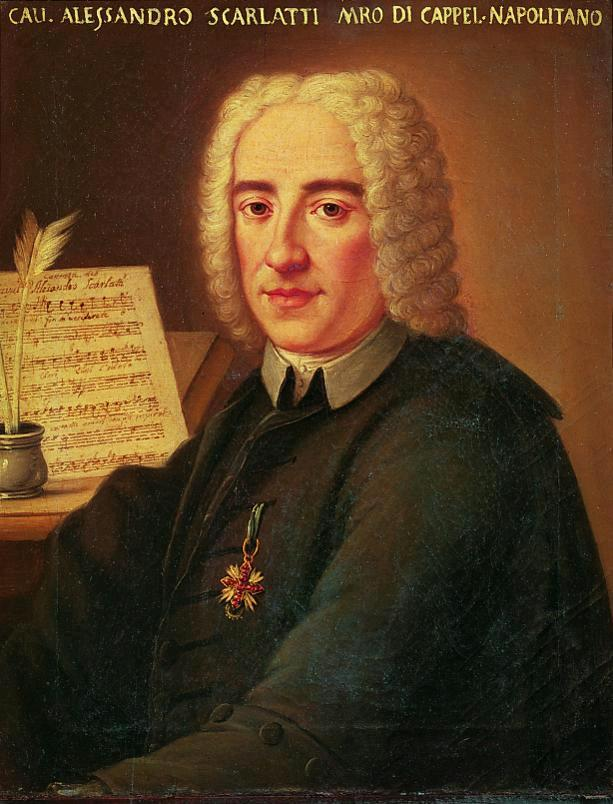
Alessandro Scarlatti, one of the first major composers of opera buffa

Comic characters had been a part of opera until the early 18th century, when opera buffa began to emerge as a separate genre, an early precursor having been the operatic comedy, Il Trespolo tutore, by Alessandro Stradella, in 1679. Opera buffa was a parallel development to opera seria, and arose in reaction to the so-called first reform of Apostolo Zeno and Pietro Metastasio. It was, in part, intended as a genre that the common man could relate to more easily. Whereas opera seria was an entertainment that was both made for and depicted kings and nobility, opera buffa was made for and depicted common people with more common problems. High-flown language was generally avoided in favor of dialogue that the lower class would relate to, often in the local dialect, and the stock characters were often derived from those of the Italian commedia dell'arte. The 1701 scherzo drammatico (dramatic jest), Il mondo abbattuto by Nicola Sabini was particularly influential in Naples, creating a popular model due to its use of both Tuscan and Neapolitan dialects.

In the early 18th century, comic operas often appeared as short, one-act interludes known as intermezzi that were performed in between acts of opera seria. There also existed, however, self-contained operatic comedies. La serva padrona (1733) by Giovanni Battista Pergolesi (1710–1736), is the one intermezzo still performed with any regularity today, and provides an excellent example of the style. Lo frate 'nnamorato (1732) and Il Flaminio (1735), by Pergolesi as well, are examples of the three-act commedia per musica.

Apart from Pergolesi, the first major composers of opera buffa were Alessandro Scarlatti (Il trionfo dell'onore, 1718), Nicola Logroscino (Il governatore, 1747) and Baldassare Galuppi (Il filosofo di campagna, 1754), all of them based in Naples or Venice. The work of these was then resumed and expanded by Niccolò Piccinni (La Cecchina, 1760), Giovanni Paisiello (Nina, 1789) and Domenico Cimarosa (Il matrimonio segreto, 1792). The genre declined in the mid-19th century, despite Giuseppe Verdi's Falstaff staged in 1893.

The importance of opera buffa diminished during the Romantic period. Here, the forms were freer and less extended than in the serious genre and the set numbers were linked by recitativo secco, the exception being Donizetti's Don Pasquale in 1843. With Rossini, a standard distribution of four characters is reached: a prima donna soubrette (soprano or mezzo); a light, amorous tenor; a basso cantante or baritone capable of lyrical, mostly ironical expression; and a basso buffo whose vocal skills, largely confined to clear articulation and the ability to "patter", must also extend to the baritone for the purposes of comic duets.

The type of comedy could vary, and the range was great: from Rossini's The Barber of Seville in 1816 which was purely comedic, to Mozart's The Marriage of Figaro in 1786 which added drama and pathos. Another example of Romantic opera buffa would be Donizetti's The Elixir of Love of 1832.

== Relation to and differences from opera seria ==
While opera seria deals with gods and ancient heroes and only occasionally contained comic scenes, opera buffa involves the predominant use of comic scenes, characters, and plot lines in a contemporary setting. The traditional model for opera seria had three acts, dealt with serious subjects in mythical settings, as stated above, and used high voices (both sopranos and castrati) for principal characters, often even for monarchs.

In contrast, the model that generally held for opera buffa was having two acts (as, for example, The Barber of Seville), presenting comic scenes and situations as earlier stated and using the lower male voices to the exclusion of the castrati. This led to the creation of the characteristic "basso buffo", a specialist in patter who was the center of most of the comic action. (A well-known basso buffo role is Leporello in Mozart's Don Giovanni.)

== See also ==
- Musical comedies
