= Antonia Sarcina =

Italian pianist and composer

Antonia Sarcina (born 1963) is an Italian pianist and composer. She is the first woman to have conducted the Banda dei Carabinieri (The Carabinieri Brass Band). Specializing in music for brass bands, she has also composed chamber music, orchestral works and music for the theatre. Her piano recitals have frequently been recorded and broadcast on Italian national radio and Vatican Radio.

== Biography ==
Born in Trieste on 23 March 1963, Antonia Sarcina lived in Rome from 1964, where from the age of 10 she began to compose and perform her creations at piano concerts. She studied classical music at the Conservatorio Santa Cecilia in Rome under Teresa Procaccini for composition, Raffaele Tega for brass band orchestration, and Bruno Aprea for conducting. Since 2002, she has taught in various schools of music: orchestration at the Conservatorio Nino Rota in Monopoli near Bari, in the Naples Conservatory and at the Conservatorio Santa Cecilia in Rome. She has composed over 90 works, ranging from religious creations to symphonic music, theatre music and arrangements for bands.

Some of her works have been honoured with awards in national or international contests. Among those who have commissioned her compositions are the Teatro Carlo Felice in Genoa, the Adkins Chiti Foundation and Certamen Vaticanum.
