= Ippolito Baccusi =

Italian composer

Ippolito Baccusi (also Baccusii, Hippolyti) (c. 1550 – 2 September 1609) was an Italian composer of the late Renaissance, active in northern Italy, including Venice, Mantua, and Verona. A member of the Venetian School of composers, he had a strong reputation as a master of counterpoint, and wrote both sacred and secular vocal music.

Little is known of his life other than the details of a few appointments, and what can be inferred from the dedications he wrote for his publications. He was born in Mantua. Sometime in the late 1560s he was appointed assistant director of the choir at San Marco in Venice, but he did not hold the position for long, going to Ravenna to study. In 1572 he was maestro di cappella at the church of Sant'Eufemia in Verona, where he may have been associated with the Veronese Accademia Filarmonica. On 14 November 1574 he was appointed maestro di cappella of the monastery of Santo Stefano in Venice, a position he resigned before 23 July 1575. By 1583 he held the maestro di cappella position at Mantua Cathedral, where among other things he taught counterpoint to Lodovico Zacconi, who mentioned him glowingly in his Prattica de musica seconda parte of 1622, particularly for his contrapuntal skill. In 1592 Baccusi accepted the position of maestro di cappella at Verona Cathedral, where he remained for the rest of his life.

Baccusi's music is in the Venetian style, influenced by Adrian Willaert, Giaches de Wert, Cipriano de Rore and Andrea Gabrieli. He was a prolific composer, but to date no significant study has been undertaken of his music. His works, mostly published in Venice, include six books of masses, six books of motets and psalm settings, and seven books of madrigals, including a complete setting as a madrigal cycle of Petrarch's 11-stanza Vergine. He also composed five- and six-voice settings of poems celebrating the Venetian victory over the Turks at Lepanto (1571). In the introductions to his 1596 and 1597 publications of masses and motets he mentioned the practice of instrumental doubling of vocal parts, something associated with the Venetian School; this is one of the first explicit references to a practice which had been going on for some time.
