= Luca D'Alberto =

Luca D’Alberto
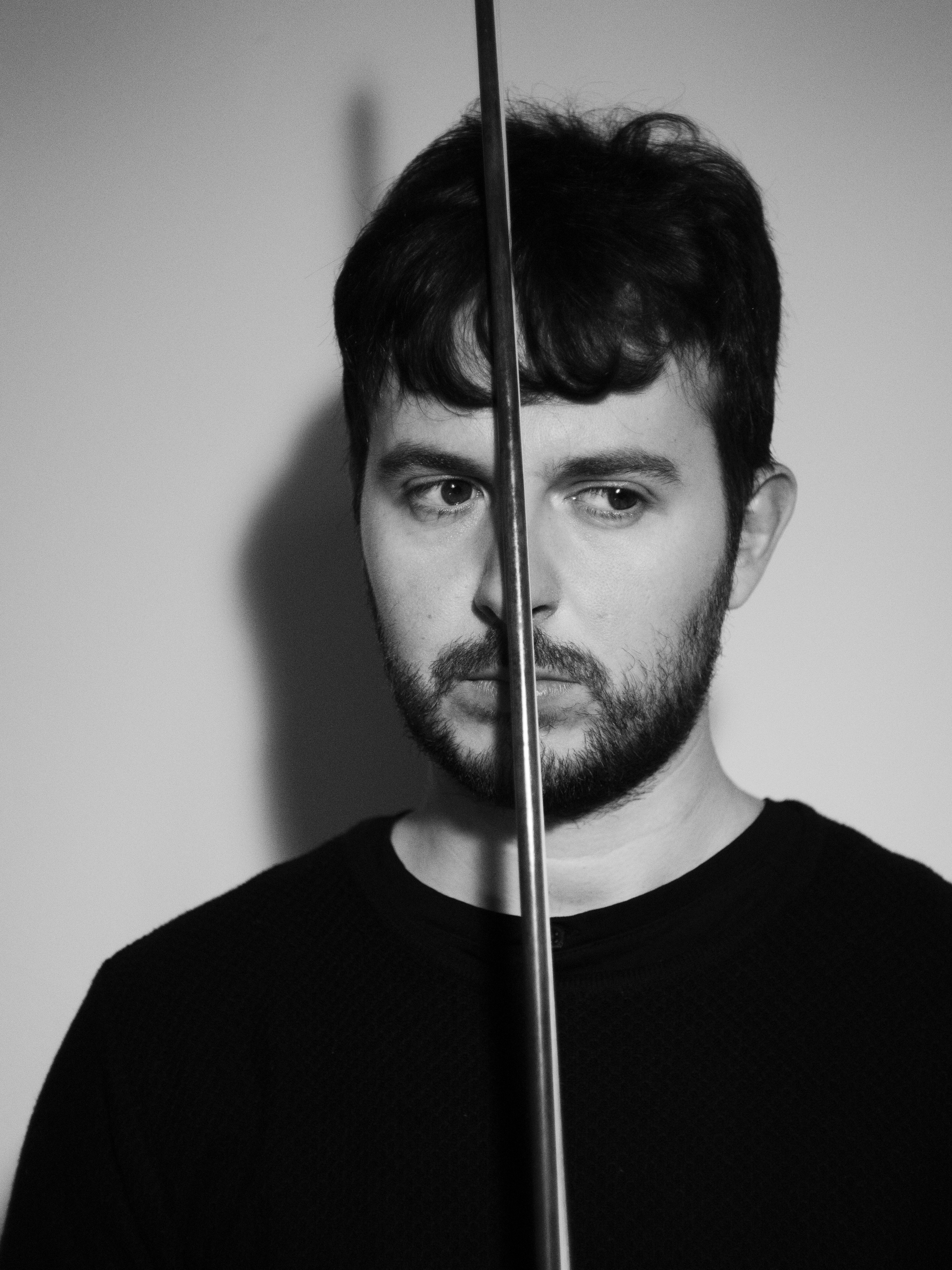

Background information
- Born: Luca D’Alberto; 6 May 1983 (age 43)
- Origin: Teramo, Abruzzo, Italy
- Genres: Film score, classical, experimental, electronica
- Occupations: Composer, musician, producer, arranger
- Instruments: Viola, violin, violectra, guitar, piano, synthesizer, multi-instrumentalist
- Years active: 2004–present
- Website: www.lucadalberto.com

Luca D’Alberto (born 6 May 1983) is an Italian composer, musician, producer, arranger and multi-instrumentalist hails from Teramo, Abruzzo.

== Early life and background ==
D’Alberto was born and brought up in Teramo, Abruzzo. He completed his graduation in violin and viola summa cum laude with a Ministerial Mention in Italy. He studied with Clara Campi, Rocco De Massis (First Violist of "San Carlo Napoli"), Antonio Anselmi (First Violinist of "Musici Di Roma") Reiner Schmidt. As a winner of international selection, he attended the Music academy in Cremona and Milano studying with Bruno Giuranna and Simonide Braconi (First Viola in Scala, Milan). During his classical studies, he became interested by other musical genres such as electronic music, rock, and experimental music.

== Career ==
In 2004, D’Alberto collaborated with Xabier Iriondo, a former guitarist and founder of Italian rock band Afterhours, creating with him the experimental music project Choral Funis Dualitas. In the same year, D'Alberto became a Violectra Official Player, testimonial of this particular instrument alongside the likes of Jean-Luc Ponty and Nigel Kennedy. In 2007, he founded the project Ex. Wave with the pianist Lorenzo Materazzo and in the same year with this project, he released the album "Apri Gli Occhi" (Do it Yourself/EMI). In 2008, and in 2011, the rock band Deep Purple chose Ex. Wave as an open act for the Milan live show (Teatro Smeraldo) and for the Verona live show (Arena di Verona).

During 2012 and 2015, he continued his artistic career as a soloist giving life to his projects ESTASI. A project of music and dance that sees as guests some dancers from Tanztheater Wuppertal Pina Bausch.

In 2013, as a composer and performer, he took part in the Pina 40 festival; a festival celebrating the 40th anniversary of the Tanztheater Wuppertal Pina Bausch. At the same time, he began a long collaboration with the director Michele Placido and the director Costanza Quatriglio.

In 2014, D’Alberto composed the original soundtrack for "9X10 novanta", "Lampedusani" with Erri De Luca directed by Costanza Quatriglio. In the same year, he composed the original soundtrack for "Prima di andar via" directed by Michele Placido and in 2015, for the original soundtrack for the movie "La scelta" directed by Michele Placido. He started working with multimedia artist Saskia Boddeke and director Peter Greenaway and he composed the original soundtrack for many of their artistic installations and movies: “Obedience” (Judisches Museum Berlin), Chtchoukine, Matisse, La Danse Et La Musique (Louis Vuitton Foundation, Paris), H Is For Horse, H Is For Hope (Festival dei Due Mondi – Spoleto, Italy) Body Parts (Sala Veronica, Murcia, Spain.)

During 2016 and 2017, he composed the original soundtrack for "Down the Volga, a river movie" directed by Saskia Boddeke and for the docufilm "The Greenaway alphabet" directed by Saskia Boddeke; "The Greenaway alphabet" has been screened in the most important film festivals in the world.

In 2017, D'Alberto began his collaboration with classical violinist Ray Chen. by reworking Bach's Chaconne. Also in 2017, he released 'ENDLESS', his first solo recording for Berlin-based, imprint 7K, it was nominated for a Libera Award in the Best Classical Album and Best Synch usage categories. ENDLESS has been largely popularized through its inclusion in films, TV series, advertising and film trailers such: Wimbledon 2017 titled, "In Pursuit of Greatness: A Year in the Making" that features Rodger Federer, Apple “The archives”, National Lottery UK, CBS "Salvation", Viceland "Wediquette", "The happy prince" directed by Rupert Everett (Trailer music). In the album, "ENDLESS" D’Alberto played all the instruments which were engineered by Martyn Heyne (who's also worked with artists like Nils Frahm and Lubomyr Melnyk), with additional production by Henrik Schwarz. The photographer Rahi Rezvani shoots the Official video for "Her dreams" one of the singles of the album.

After Luca released 'Endless Reworks', which was a remastered and remixed version of the original album, fusing traditional classical music compositions with the electronic world. The album features were reworked by artists as diverse as Robert Lippok, Fabian Russ, Machinefabriek, Dæmon Tapes, and label mates Hior Chronik and Niklas Paschburg. Many producers, as Howie B, Populous, Richard Dorfmeister released remixes of Luca's tracks.

In 2018, his next step with ‘Exile’, his second studio album and his second release with 7K!. D’Alberto played all the instruments and in EXILE used electronics as a means to amplify the expressive power of acoustic instruments such as piano, strings, drums of oriental tradition, gongs, and Tibetan quartz bells. This operation was brought about in collaboration with Patrick Christensen aka PC Nackt, a figure of the German music scene, composer and multi-instrumentalist who started the String Theory project and has produced various artists including Apparat. In the same year, D'Alberto composed the original soundtrack for the movie "Sembra mio figlio" directed by Costanza Quatriglio, for the animated film "Mercurio" directed by Michele Bernardi and for this film he won the "Best Original Soundtrack" at Festival Internacional de Cine por la Memoria Democrática (FESCIMED).

He played in important festivals such as ESNS Eurosonic Festival and in the prestigious location as Elbphilharmonie in Hamburg.

In 2019, D'Alberto composed the original soundtrack for the movie "La Misma Sangre" directed by Miguel Cohan.

== Discography ==
- 2017 ENDLESS (label !7K)
- 2017 Endless Rework (label !7K)
- 2018 EXILE (label !7K)

== Music for theater ==
- 2011: Così è…se vi pare (Director: Michele Placido)
- 2012: Re Lear (Director: Michele Placido)
- 2012: Puccini (with Giorgio Albertazzi, Director: Giovanni De Feudis)
- 2013: Un bacio sul cuore (with Isabella Ferrari, Director: Michele Placido)
- 2013: Dante: quali colombe (Director: Michele Placido)
- 2013: Pina40
- 2015: Tradimenti (Director: Michele Placido)
- 2016: I duellanti (Director: Alessio Boni)
- 2017: L'ora di ricevimento (with Fabrizio Bentivoglio, Director: Michele Placido)
- 2018: Sei personaggi in cerca d'autore (Director: Michele Placido)

== Music for installation Art ==
- 2015: Obedience (Director: Saskia Boddeke & Peter Greenaway)
- 2016: Chtchoukine, Matisse: La Danse et La Musique (Director: Saskia Boddeke & Peter Greenaway)
- 2017: H is for Horse, H is for Hope (Director Saskia Boddeke. Script, artworks: Peter Greenaway)
- 2017: Body Parts (Director: Saskia Boddeke & Peter Greenaway)
- 2018: Masters of modern art from the Hermitage (Director: Saskia Boddeke & Peter Greenaway)

== Music for advertising ==
- 2017: Wimbledon "In pursuit of Greatness: A Year in the Making"
- 2017: Apple "The archives"

== Music for cinema ==
- 2009: The hidden evidence (with Marco Blanchi, Director: Iacopo Tumino)
- 2014: Prima di andar via (Director: Michele Placido)
- 2014: 9x10 Novanta (Director: Costanza Quatriglio)
- 2015: La scelta (Director: Michele Placido)
- 2015: Lontana da me (Director: Claudio Di Biagio)
- 2016: Down the Volga, a river movie (Director: Saskia Boddeke)
- 2017: The Greenaway alphabet (with Peter Greenaway, Director: Saskia Boddeke)
- 2018: Sembra mio figlio (Director: Costanza Quatriglio)
- 2018: Mercurio (Director: Michele Bernardi)
- 2019: La misma sangre (with Oscar Martinez, Director: Miguel Cohan)

== Awards and nominations ==
Year	Award	Category	Result
2017	Music Week Synch Award	Sync Artist of the Year	Nominated
2018	Libera awards	Best album & Best synch	Nominated
2018	Best Original Soundtrack for Mercurio	Original Soundtrack	Won

== See also ==
- List of Italian composers
- Music of Italy
- Italian popular music
- Ferdinando Arnò
- Ludovico Einaudi
- Philip Glass
- Olafur Arnalds
- Nils Frahm
