= Enrico Martinelli =

Italian composer

Enrico Martinelli (24. November 1852 – 8 April 1922) was an Italian trumpet player, teacher and composer.

Enrico was born in Modena, the son of to Ludovico Martinelli, a local barber, and Maria Rinaldi, a tailoress, and the first child of seven. At the age of ten he started to play the trumpet, first under Girolamo Altinieri, the conductor of the national army band in Modena and later with Gaetano Ferrari. At the age of 15 he became a member of the City Guard Band and one year later also started to play in the orchestra of the Teatro Aliprandi. In 1869 Martinelli enlists to the 4º reggimento Granatieri di Lombardia, an army unit stationed in Catania and took part of the Third Italian Independence War and the liberation of Rome.

Martinelli left the army in 1877 and went back to his hometown and became the first trumpeter in the Municipal Band of Modena, a position he held for 27 years. He also founded three new music ensembles in Modena: In 1878 the Concerto della Societa di Ginnastica e Schermo 'Panaro' ; in 1891 the Fanfara del Patronato pei Figli del Popolo and in 1893 the Banda dell'Instituto Provinciale S. Filippo Neri e S. Bernardino.

Beside his musical position in Modena, he had a significant reputation as a trumpeter throughout Italy. He played the first trumpet under the direction of renowned conductors and composers like Alberto Franchetti, Luigi Mancinelli, Lorenzo Perosi, Giuseppe Martucci, Amilcare Zanella, Cleofonte Campanini, Franco Faccio, Guido Alberto Fano, Pio Ferrari, Edoardo Mascheroni, Tullio Serafin and Arturo Toscanini.

His prestige as a distinguished trumpeter shows the following anecdote: In November 1899 the music director of La Scala, Giulio Gatti-Casazza, wrote a letter to the mayor of Modena to ask for the release of Martinelli from his work there for a few months to play the first trumpet at his house in Milan. This request was initiated by Arturo Toscanini, who was looking for an outstanding trumpeter for several performances of operas by Richard Wagner.

Arturo Toscanini wrote already in 1895 about the qualities of Martinelli:

Enrico Martinelli [..] was several times part of orchestras I conducted and proved his capacity as first trumpeter, [..] earning all my esteem both as distinguished artist and as exquisite person.

Similar words are known from a letter by Pietro Mascagni:

Enrico Martinelli, professor of trumpet, is a performer of the highest rank and a perfect musician.

For many years Martinelli taught trumpet student at the Instituto Provinciale in Modena and was also requested to take part of the music exams at other conservatories throughout Italy.

Beside his work as a trumpeter and teacher, Martinelli also composed music for all kinds of instrumentations from symphony to chamber, vocal and band music.

Martinelli ended his career as a musician in 1920 and laid down his trumpet, which later was handed over to the Museo Civico Estense in Modena. Two years later he died in Modena of a pulmonary emphysema.

The Via Enrico Martinelli in Modena is named in honour of the musician.
