= Emilia Gubitosi =

Italian pianist and composer

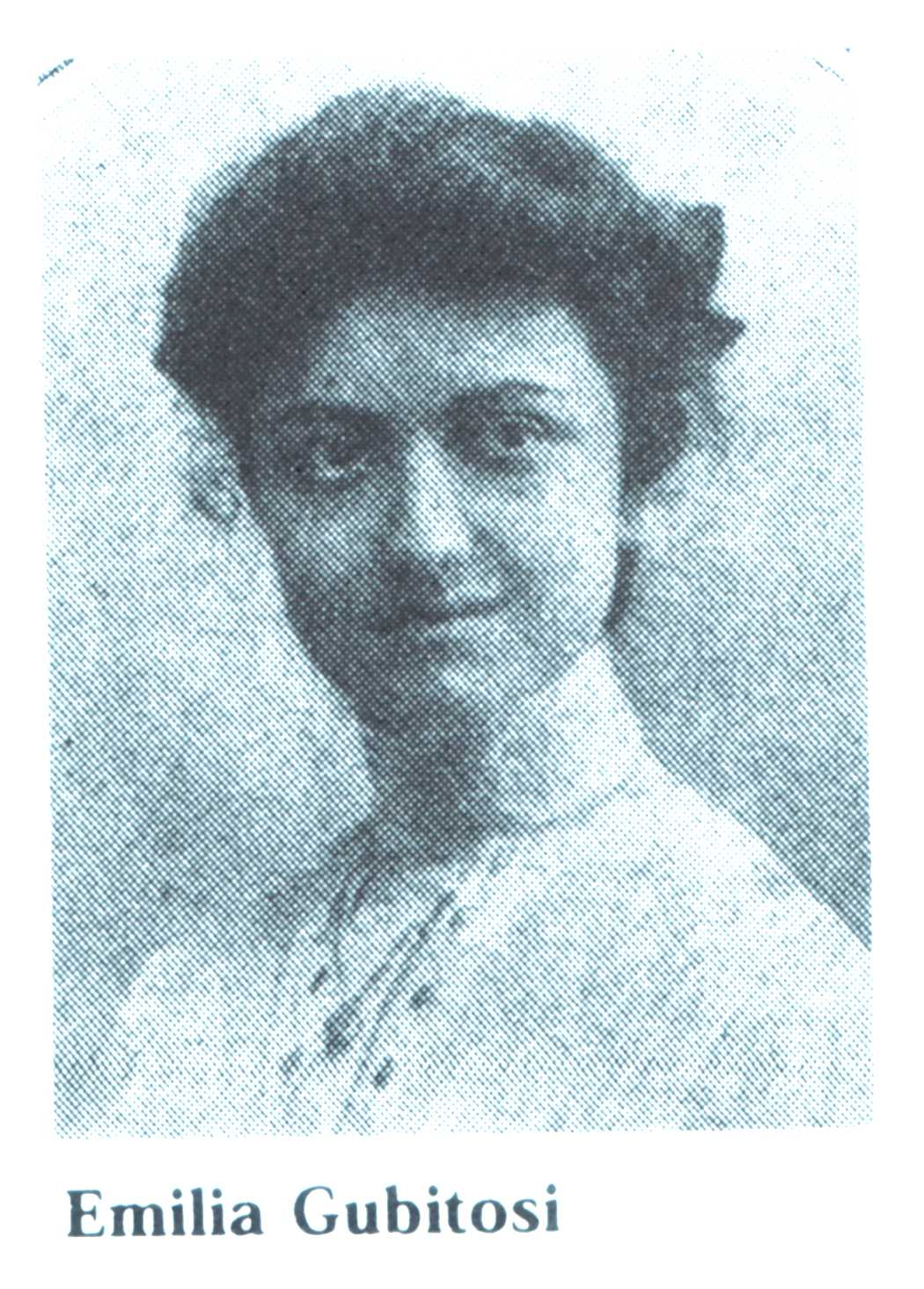
Emilia Gubitosi

Emilia Gubitosi (3 Feb 1887 – 17 Jan 1972) was an Italian pianist and composer. She was the first woman to graduate in composition from the Conservatorio San Pietro a Majella in Naples. She worked as a concert pianist in Europe until her marriage to composer Franco Michele Napolitano, and then as an administrator. She later taught at the Conservatory and assisted with the symphony orchestra and the choral school. She helped found the Associazione Musicale Alessandro Scarlatti in Naples. She was a composer of large-scale works for orchestra, as well as operas and chamber works.

== Life ==
Emilia Gubitosi was born in Naples and studied music with Beniamino Cesi, Costantino Palumbo, Fromesco Simonetti, Camillo De Nardis and Nicola D'Arienzo at the Conservatorio San Pietro a Majella in Naples, graduating in 1906 with a diploma in piano and in 1906 as the first woman graduate in composition.

After completing her studies, she worked as a concert pianist in Europe. She married composer Franco Michele Napolitano and worked for a while as a music administrator. In 1914 she took a position teaching at the Conservatory, where she remained until 1957. She assisted with the symphony orchestra in Naples and directed the associated choir school. In 1918 she helped to found the Associazione Musicale Alessandro Scarlatti in Naples to increase awareness of early Italian music. She died in Naples on 17 January 1972.

== Works ==
Gubitosi composed mostly large-scale works for orchestra, but also chamber works and songs, and two operas, Fatum, a four-act work, and Nada Delvig, a one-act opera published in 1909. Selected works include:

- Concerto for piano and orchestra (1917; publ. 1943)
- Allegro appassionato for violin and orchestra (1925)
- Sinfonia for large orchestra (publ. 1932)
- Corale sinfonico for orchestra and organ (1941)
- Notturno for orchestra (1941)
- Il flauto notturno, for soprano, flute and orchestra
- Serenata
- Dormire
- Favoletta Russa (1931) for piano
- Andante mosso
- Fatum, 4-act opera

Gubitosi also transcribed and arranged 17th and 18th-century vocal music. She published texts, including:

- Suono e ritmo (Naples, 1919) with F. M. Napolitano
- Compendio di teoria musicale (Naples, 1930)
