= Lodovico Zacconi =

Italian composer (1555 - 1627)

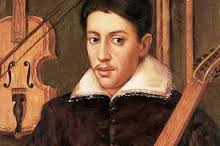

Background information
- Born: 11 June 1555; Pesaro, Italy
- Died: 23 March 1627 (aged 71) Pesaro, Italy
- Genres: Baroque
- Occupation: Composer

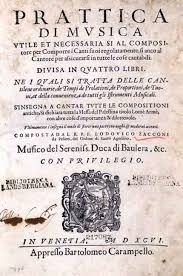

Lodovico (or Ludovico) Zacconi (11 June 1555 – 23 March 1627) was an Italian composer and musical theorist of the late Renaissance and early Baroque eras. He worked as a singer, theologian, and writer on music in northern Italy and Austria; for a time he was in the employ of Archduke Karl of Graz, and worked in Graz and Vienna.

== Biography ==
Born in Pesaro, in the Marche, Zacconi became an Augustinian friar at Venice, where he was ordained priest. In 1577 he was in Venice studying at the church of San Stefano, and at some point in the following six years he was accepted by Andrea Gabrieli as a student of counterpoint. In 1584 he auditioned at San Marco as a singer, and was accepted; however he seems to have declined the position. Also at this time he met Zarlino, the prominent Venetian School theorist; he was to mention the meeting in the second part of his Prattica di musica (1622). On 20 July 1585, he joined the musical establishment of Archduke Karl of Graz, a position he retained until Karl's death in 1590. Subsequently, he joined the chapel of Wilhelm V, Duke of Bavaria, which was directed by Orlande de Lassus.

In 1596 he left the employ of Wilhelm, returning to Italy; in the following years he worked as a prior at Pesaro, and as a preacher and administrator in both Italy and Crete. He retired to Pesaro in 1612, where he remained until his death (at Fiorenzuola di Focara, near Pesaro).

== Works ==
Zacconi's fame rests on his great work Prattica di Musica, first published in 1592 at Venice, of which a second volume appeared in 1619 (or, according to other sources, 1622).

His theoretical works are conservative, and make no mention of the emerging Baroque style, in spite of his studies with the distinguished Venetian composer Andrea Gabrieli. His most important works are the two books of Prattica di musica (Musical Practice) which he published in Venice in 1592 and 1622. These two volumes—containing four works—treat exhaustively of musical theory, and are copiously illustrated. The directions for rendering polyphonic music are of the highest value, especially the Palestrina illustrations. He deals fully with the six Authentic and six Plagal Modes, studiously omitting the Locrian and Hypolocrian Modes. But he also treats of orchestral instruments—their compass and method of playing—and gives valuable information as to the scoring of early operas and oratorios. In fact he covers the whole ground of music, as practised at the close of the 16th century.

Zacconi's treatises are an invaluable guide to the study of performance practice of vocal music of the very late Renaissance. Parts of his work were incorporated by Michael Praetorius into his Syntagma musicum (1618), and by Pietro Cerone into his Melopeo y maestro (1613).
