= Diego Zucchinetti =

Italian composer

Diego Zucchinetti was an Italian composer of the second half of the 18th century. He was probably born in the late 1760s and studied in Naples at the Conservatorio della Pietà de' Turchini, where he probably had Lorenzo Fago, Pasquale Cafaro and Giacomo Tritto as his teachers. He composed mostly instrumental even if his music is filled with Italian opera music style. Under his name there are some masses and motets, but it is not sure if they are genuine.

== Works ==
- Tre Sonate per Cembalo o Pianoforte, con Flauto o Violino obbligato (c.1794) published in 1798 in France as Op.1
- Tema e Variazioni per Cembalo
- Rondo per Pianoforte
- Sonata per Cembalo
- Quartetto buffo "Luci tenere vi adoro"
- Nonna per il Natale (Christmas Lullaby)

== Three Sonatas (Op.1) ==
Diego Zucchinetti's Three Sonatas for the harpsichord or pianoforte with violin or flute belong to a genre—keyboard sonata with an accompanying melodic instrument—that was quite common by the late 18th century. They are all cast in three movements and show such a balanced distribution of musical material between the instruments, they can be virtually regarded as duets. Operatic passages and cantabile melodies link these pleasing specimens of late-century Italian instrumental music to their Neapolitan roots.
