= Maria Luigia Pizzoli =

Italian pianist and composer (1817–1838)

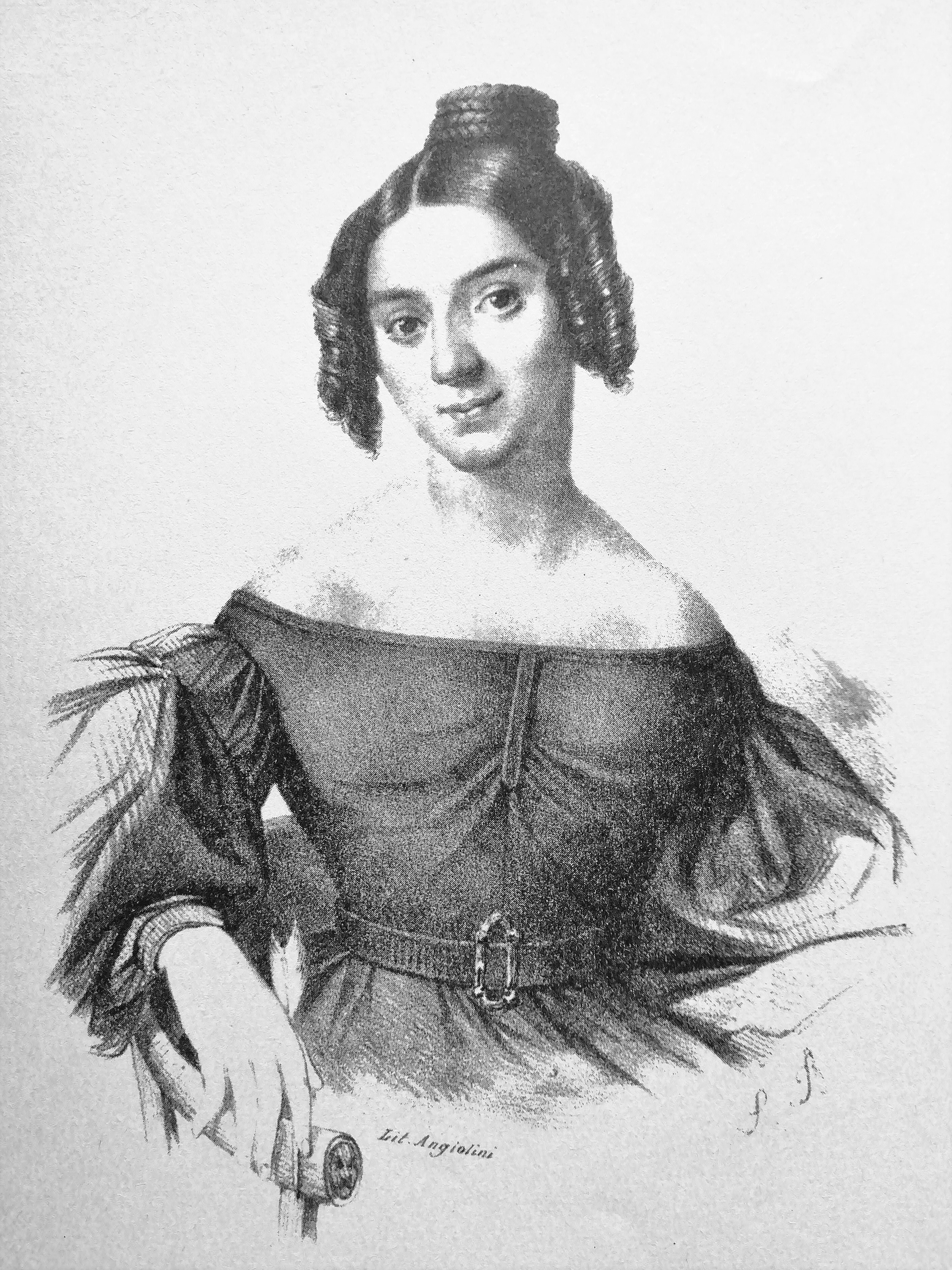
- Born: 10 February 1817; Bologna, Papal States
- Died: 13 January 1838 (aged 20)
- Occupations: Pianist and composer

Maria Luigia Pizzoli (10 February 1817 – 13 January 1838) was an Italian pianist and composer. She posthumously received the honour of Maestro di Contrappunto.

== Personal life ==
Pizzoli was born in Bologna, Italy, on 10 February 1817. Her parents had her educated well, and she became known for her intelligence. She was fluent in Italian and French, and she enjoyed history including art history. She studied music under the teacher Giuseppe Pilotti. After being taught by Pilotti for 18 months, she wrote her first prelude. Gaetano Magazzari also taught Pizzoli the piano.

== Career ==
Pizzoli was a well-known pianist in Bologna, and she later began to compose her own pieces. She wrote an overture, and later a symphony in 1836. Her first public appearance was in 1837 when she was invited to the Società del Casino di Bologna headquarters to perform on the piano with a well-regarded harpist. At the festival, Pizzoli played one of her works with the support of Gaetano Corticelli. She suffered from a heart disease.

== Death ==
Pizzoli's father, with approval from his daughter during her last year, gave money as a prize to students who composed the best fugue. The prize was considered to be innovative because women could also receive it. She died on 13 January 1838, at 20 years old, and she was buried in Bologna. In February 1838, professors played Pizzoli's music at the Teatro del Corso. Her obituary in the music periodical Allgemeine musikalische Zeitung stated that she "was close to being accepted into the Accademia Filarmonica di Bologna as Maestro di Contrappunto (master of counterpoint)". She posthumously received the honour on 16 October 1840. Pizzoli's music was collected and published in Milan in 1840. Some of Pizzoli's compositions are at the Accademia Filarmonica di Bologna.
