= Giovanni Ghizzolo =

Italian composer

Giovanni Ghizzolo (Brescia ca. 1580–Novara ca. 1625) was a Franciscan friar, composer of motets and madrigals. From 1613, he was maestro di cappella successively at Correggio, Ravenna, Padua, and ended his life in Novara.

He published eleven prints of sacred music, both in concertato and "a cappella" style, and nine of secular music - three books of polyphonic madrigals for 5 and 6 voices and six (one lost) of madrigals, arias and canzonette for 1-2-3 voices from 1608 till 1623. Some of his sacred music collections have been reprinted several times, until 1640.

His Gioco della cieca, contained in Book 1 of Madrigals, takes 123 verses from Il pastor fido of Giovanni Battista Guarini (Act III, Scene 2), also set by Gastoldi and others, to make a theatrical madrigal-drama.

== Editions ==
- Madrigali et arie per sonare et cantare: libro primo (1609) ed. Judith Cohen (2005)
- Secondo libro de madrigali, Venice

== Recordings ==
- Benedicite Deum caeli. Jubilemus et laetemur omnes. on Fabellae Sacrae. Savadi. 2008
- Second Book of Madrigals. Roberto Balconi, Fantazyas. Brilliant Classics
