= Teresa Procaccini =

Italian composer and music educator

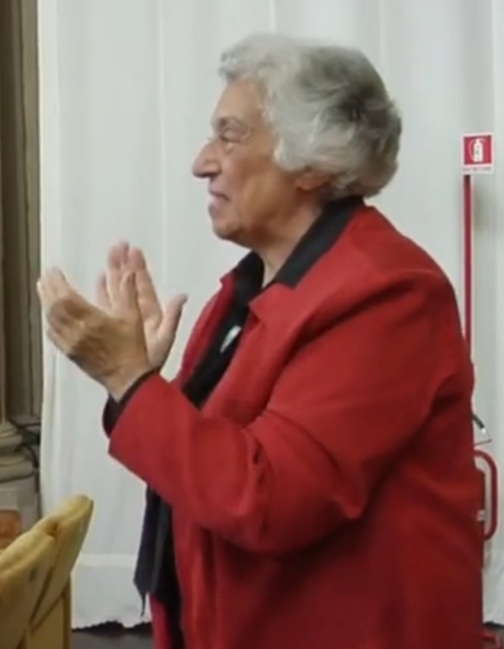
Teresa Procaccini

Teresa Procaccini (born 23 March 1934 in Cerignola) is an Italian composer and music educator. She taught composition at the Accademia di Santa Cecilia in Rome. Procaccini has won a number of prizes, including the Viotti competition, the Casella Prize and the International String Quartet Competition of San Francisco.

== Biography ==
Teresa Procaccini was born in Cerignola in 1934. She began composing as a child, writing piano pieces at the age of eight. She studied organ with Fernando Germani and composition with Virgilio Mortari at the Foggia Conservatory. Between 1971 and 1972, she directed the Conservatory of Foggia, and until 2001 taught composition at the Accademia di Santa Cecilia in Rome. In 1972 she became the artistic director of the Friends of Music Association of Foggia.

Procaccini has won national and international prizes, including the Viotti competition, the Casella Prize and the International String Quartet Competition of San Francisco. She has given master classes at the Festival of Città di Castello, the Academy "Respighi" of Assisi, the "Internationalen Meisterkursen" of Duren (Germany) and the Summer Music Frentana Lanciano. Her works have been performed internationally in Australia, Europe, Canada and North and South America, and have been broadcast.

== Selected works ==
Procaccini is the author of more than 200 works (232 as of May 2014), including concertos for solo instrument and orchestra, piano and other music for children (fairy music, didactic works for children's choir and young instrumentalists), and also has written compositions for theatrical cartoons and Rai Italia. Selected works include:

Orchestral Works

- Sinfonietta for small orchestra, Op. 7 (1956)
- Fantasia for orchestra, Op. 16 (1958)
- Divagazioni (Digressions) for string orchestra, Op. 22 (1959)
- Sensazioni sonore, 4 Pieces for orchestra, Op. 44 (1969) - orig. for two pianos, Op. 38 (1968)
- Un cavallino avventuroso, musical fairy tale for orchestra, Op. 49 (1970–71) - orig. for narrator and piano, Op. 23 (1960)
- Musica per archi (Music for Strings), Op. 53 (1971)
- Intersecazioni (Intersections) for string orchestra, Op. 118 (1989)
- Marionette for orchestra, Op. 121 (1990) - orig. for piano four-hands, Op. 55 (1972)
- Pastorale for orchestra, Op. 123 (1990)
- Fireworks for symphonic band, Op. 141 (1997)
- La Bella Galiana, ballet in 5 parts, Op. 149 (1998)
- Una Sera a Parigi (An Evening in Paris), for orchestra, Op. 163 (1960/1998) - also arranged for piano and orchestra, Op. 184 (1960/2004)
- American Dance for string orchestra, Op. 182 (2004)

Concertante Works

- Sonata in Tricromia, for piano and orchestra, Op. 11 (1957) - orig. for solo piano, Op. 2 (1955)
- Concerto for organ and orchestra, Op. 12 (1957)
- Concerto for trio (violin, cello, piano) and orchestra “I folletti” ("The goblins"), Op. 14 (1958)
- Jazz Fantasy for piano and orchestra, Op. 16 (1958)
- Musica barbara for concertante piano and orchestra, Op. 20 (1959) - also arranged for two pianos, Op. 21 (1959), and for piano and 10 instruments, Op. 91 (1980)
- Tre Danze (Three Dances) for 2 trumpets and string orchestra, Op. 24 (1961)
- Tre Danze (Three Dances) for oboe, clarinet in B-flat and string orchestra, Op. 25 (1961) - arrangement of the above
- Marionette for piano and 10 instruments, Op. 68 (1975) - orig. for piano four-hands, Op. 55 (1972); also arranged for orchestra, Op. 121 (1990)
- Concertino for flute and string orchestra, Op. 74 (1976)
- Concertino for bassoon and 8 wind instruments, Op. 77 (1977)
- Concerto for harp and orchestra, Op. 88 (1980)
- Echo for violin and string orchestra, Op. 106 (1983)
- Tre Danze (Three Dances) for marimba and string orchestra, Op. 129 (1992) - arrangement of Op. 24/25 ?
- Fantasia Romantica for piano and symphonic band, Op. 145 (1960/1998) - also arranged for piano and full orchestra as Sentimental Day, Op. 206 (1960/2008)
- Rapsodia Americana for piano and symphonic band, Op. 147 (1958/1998) - also arranged for piano and full orchestra as New York Picture, Op. 203 (1958/2008)
- Holiday Concert for piano and symphonic band, Op. 158 (1999)
- Chant de Noël for oboe and string orchestra, Op. 166 (2000)
- Una Sera a Parigi (An Evening in Paris), for piano and orchestra, Op. 184 (1960/2004) - also version for orchestra without piano, Op. 163 (1960/1998)
- Concerto for 2 guitars and orchestra, Op. 193 (2006)
- New York Picture, for piano and orchestra, Op. 203 (1958/2008) - also called "Rapsodia Americana" (Op. 147) in the version for piano and symphonic band
- Viaggio a Las Vegas (Trip to Las Vegas), for piano and orchestra, Op. 204 (1958/2008) - also called "Ritmo Fantasia" in the shorter version for symphonic band (without piano)
- Movie Music, for piano and orchestra, Op. 205 (1960/2008)
- Sentimental Day, for piano and orchestra, Op. 206 (1960/2008) - also called "Fantasia Romantica" (Op. 145) in the version for piano and symphonic band
- Night Music, for piano and orchestra, Op. 207 (1960/2008) - also called "Musica notturna" in the version for piano and symphonic band
- Echo, for clarinet in B-flat and string orchestra, Op. 244 (2016) - originally scored for violin and string orchestra, Op. 106 (1983)
- Concerto for guitar, piano and orchestra, Op. 246 (2017)

Chamber Music

- Trio for violin, cello and piano, Op. 5 (1956)
- Divertimento for quintet, Op. 6 (1956) - revised as Op. 89/90 (1980)
- Sonata rapsodica for cello and piano, Op. 8 (1957)
- Invenzione (Invention) for flute, oboe, clarinet (or bassoon) and piano, Op. 9 (1957)
- Fantasia for violin and piano, Op. 10 (1957)
- Piccolo concerto for 14 instruments, Op. 19 (1959) - revised for 13 instruments as Op. 138 (1996)
- Musica barbara for two pianos, Op. 21 (1959) - orig. for piano and orchestra, Op. 20 (1959)
- Quartet for flute, oboe, basson and piano, Op. 27 (1965)
- Tre Pezzi (Three Pieces) for bassoon (or contralto saxophone) and piano, Op. 30 (1966)
- Serenata (Serenade) for flute, two violins, cello and harpsichord, Op. 31 (1967)
- Sonata for bassoon and piano, Op. 32 (1968) - also arranged for clarinet and piano, Op. 117 (1988)
- Dialogo for viola and piano, Op. 34 (1968)
- Dialogo for horn and piano, Op. 35 (1968) - arrangement of the above
- Trio for clarinet, cello and piano, Op. 36 (1968)
- Trio for flute, cello and piano, Op. 37 (1968) - arrangement of the above
- Sensazioni sonore, 4 Pieces for 2 pianos, Op. 38 (1968) - also arranged for orchestra, Op. 44 (1969)
- Clown Music, 4 Pieces for wind quintet, Op. 39 (1968)
- Improvvisazione (Improvisation) for violin, viola and cello, Op. 40 (1968)
- Introduzione e Allegro (Introduction and Allegro) for flute and piano, Op. 41 (1969)
- Sonata for viola and piano, Op. 43 (1969)
- String Quartet, Op. 45 (1969)
- Quintet for horn and string quartet, Op. 50 (1971)
- Mystère for double bass and piano, Op. 73 (1976)
- Sonata for flute and piano, Op. 75 (1976)
- Lied (n°1) for flute and harp, Op. 76 (1977)
- Concertino for bassoon and 8 wind instruments, Op. 77 (1977)
- Serenata notturna for horn and harp, Op. 78 (1977)
- Prelude and March for horn and 8 instruments, Op. 79 (1977)
- Meditazione (Meditation) for horn and string quartet, Op. 80 (1978)
- Meditazione (Meditation) for horn and piano, Op. 81 (1978) - arrangement of the above
- Lied n°2 for oboe and piano, Op. 84 (1978)
- Dialoghi (Dialogues) for percussions and piano, Op. 85 (1979)
- Divertissement for four trumpets and trombone, Op. 89 (1980) - revision of Op. 6 (1956)
- Divertissement for brass quintet (for trumpet in Bb, flugelhorn in Bb, horn in F, trombone and tuba), Op. 90 (1980) - arrangement of the above
- Musica barbara for piano and 10 instruments, Op. 91 (1980) - orig. for piano and orchestra, Op. 20 (1959)
- Octet for clarinet, bassoon, horn, 2 violins, viola, cello and double bass, Op. 94 (1981)
- Duo for violin and viola, Op. 96 (1982) - also arranged for violin and cello, Op. 127
- Tre Danze (Three Dances) for 2 trumpets, double quintet and percussion, Op. 109 (1984) - arrangement of Op. 24
- Suggestions for clarinet (or bass clarinet) and piano, Op. 113 (1987)
- 3 Arabesques for 2 guitars, Op. 114 (1988)
- Meeting for saxophone quartet, Op. 115 (1988)
- Sonata for clarinet in B-flat and piano, Op. 117 (1988) - orig. for bassoon and piano, Op. 32 (1968)
- Trio for flute, viola and harp, Op. 124 (1990)
- Tre Pezzi (Three Pieces) for bass clarinet and piano, Op. 125 (1990) - arrangement of Op. 30 ?
- Quartet for violin, clarinet in B-flat, cello and piano, Op. 126 (1991) - arrangement of Op. 27 ?
- Duo for violin and cello, Op. 127 (1991) - orig. for violin and viola, Op. 96 (1982)
- Quintet for oboe, clarinet, bassoon, horn and piano, Op. 130 (1992)
- Play for wind quintet and bass clarinet (flute, oboe, clarinet, bass clarinet, horn and bassoon), Op. 131 (1992)
- Sensazioni sonore, 4 Pieces for 2 pianos and percussion, Op. 133 (1993) - orig. for two pianos (without percussion), Op. 38 (1968); also arranged for orchestra, Op. 44 (1969)
- Sonatina for marimba and piano, Op. 136 (1995)
- Piccolo concerto for 13 instruments, Op. 138 (1996) - revision of Op. 19
- Sonata for horn and piano, Op. 139 (1997)
- Sextet for wind quintet and piano, Op. 140 (1997) - revision of Op. 31
- Moonlight, for 3 guitars, Op. 142 (1997)
- Trio for clarinet, viola and piano, Op. 148 (1998)
- Moments, for contrabassoon and piano, Op. 153 (1998)
- Guitargames, for 4 guitars, Op. 154 (1999)
- Promenade, for 4 guitars, Op. 155 (1999)
- Mutazioni (Mutations) for violin and piano, Op. 160 (1999)
- Marionette for flute, clarinet, piano and reciting voice (ad libitum), Op. 170 (2002) - orig. for piano four-hands, Op. 55 (1972); also arranged for orchestra, Op. 121 (1990)
- 5 pezzi facili (Five easy pieces) for cello and piano, Op. 178 (2003)
- 5 pezzi facili (Five easy pieces) for violin and piano, Op. 179 (2003) - arrangement of the above
- Jazz Fantasy for marimba (or xylophone) and piano, Op. 180 (2003) - arrangement of Op. 16 ?
- Recuerdos, for guitar and piano, Op. 181 (2004)
- Trio for flute, violin and piano, Op. 183 (2004)
- 24 Pieces for 1 & 2 clarinets (or contralto saxophones) and piano (in 2 volumes), Op. 185 (2004)
- American Rhapsody for 12 saxophones, piano and percussions, Op. 188 (2005)
- Little Game, for vibraphone, marimba (or xylophone) and piano, Op. 196 (2006)
- Divertimento for five, for flute, 2 violins, cello and piano, Op. 197 (2006)
- Dream, for flute and harp (or for horn and piano), Op. 199 (2007)
- Nenia, for flute and piano, Op. 200 (2007)
- Lied n°3 for horn and piano, Op. 209 (2009)

Instrumental Music

- Sonata in Tricromia, for piano, Op. 2 (1955) - also arranged for piano and orchestra, Op. 11 (1957)
- Piano Sonata (n°2), Op. 3 (1955)
- Fantasia for piano, Op. 4 (1956)
- Sonatina (n°1) for piano (or harpsichord), Op. 18 (1958)
- Sonatina for solo cello, Op. 28 (1965)
- Nove Preludi (Nine Preludes) for piano, Op. 29 (1966)
- Improvviso e Toccata (Improvisation and Toccata) for organ, Op. 33 (1968)
- Sonatina for piano n°2, Op. 46 (1970)
- Andante elegiaco for organ, Op. 52 (1971)
- Andante and Rondo for solo flute, Op. 54 (1971)
- Marionette for piano four-hands, Op. 55 (1972) - also arranged for orchestra, Op. 121 (1990)
- Cinque pezzi incaici (Five Inca pieces) for guitar, Op. 71 (1975)
- Sei Studi per chitarra (Six Studies for guitar), Op. 72 (1975)
- Little horse’s story, for piano four-hands (with reciting voice ad libitum), Op. 83 (1978)
- Eagle for solo flute, Op. 103 (1983)
- 5 Piccoli Pezzi (Five Little Pieces) for piano, Op. 104 (1961-1983) - formerly listed as Op. 91 in the previous version which included 6 Pieces
- Homenaje (B.A.C.H.) for organ, Op. 111 (1985)
- Spleen, for guitar, Op. 132 (1992)
- Prayer for organ, Op. 161 (2000)
- Blues and Ragtime, for piano, Op. 171 (2002)
- Sonatina breve (Sonatina n°3) for piano "Prime curiosità", Op. 173 (2002)
- Adagio and Allegro for solo clarinet in B-flat, Op. 175 (2003)
- Sogno Americano (American Dream), six pieces for piano, Op. 220 (1958/2012) - consists in solo piano versions of New York Picture, Viaggio a Las Vegas (Trip to Las Vegas), Una Sera a Parigi (An Evening in Paris), Movie Music, Sentimental Day and Night Music
- Elevazione (Elevation), for organ, Op. 231 (2014)
- For Guitar, for solo guitar, Op. 237 (2015)
- Fo(u)r Flute, for four flutes, Op. 239 (2015)
- Silver Moon, for four flutes, Op. 240 (2013)
- Due pezzi brevi (Two Short Pieces), for organ, Op. 241 (2015)
- Luna, for ensemble of mandolines, Op. 242 (2015)

Vocal and Choral Works

- Tre Liriche (Three Poems) for song and piano, Op. 1 (1955)
- Dannazione e Preghiera, for mezzo-soprano and string orchestra, Op. 13 (1957) - also arranged for voice and piano, Op. 67
- Il giudizio di Salomone (The Judgment of Solomon), cantata for soloists, choir and orchestra, Op. 15 (1958)
- La peste di Atene (The Plague of Athens), cantata for choir and orchestra, on texts by Lucrezio Caro, Op. 17 (1958)
- Un cavallino avventuroso, musical fairy tale for narrator and piano, Op. 23 (1960; rev. 1981) - also arranged for orchestra, Op. 49 (1970), and for another effective, Op. 93
- 3 Canti popolari (Three Popular Songs), for vocal trio a cappella, Op. 42 (1969) - also arranged for choir, Op. 87
- Elegia for mezzo-soprano, flute and piano, Op. 47 (1970)
- La levataccia (The early rising), for four-voice choir, Op. 51 (1971)
- Evocazione (Evocation) for soprano, mezzo-soprano and piano, Op. 56 (1972)
- Evocazione (Evocation) for soprano, bassoon and piano, Op. 57 (1972) - arrangement of the above
- Evocazione (Evocation) for soprano, violin and organ, Op. 58 (1972) - arrangement of the above
- Canciones (Songs) for soprano, clarinet in B-flat, bassoon and piano, Op. 59 (1972)
- Canciones (Songs) for soprano, oboe, bassoon and piano, Op. 60 (1972) - arrangement of the above
- Canciones (Songs) for soprano, clarinet in B-flat, viola and piano, Op. 61 (1972) - arrangement of the above
- Piazza della Musica n°1 for 15 instruments and reciting voice, Op. 62 (1971–72) - revised as Op. 82 (1978)
- La prima notte (The first night), comic opera in oce act, Op. 63 (1973)
- Questione di fiducia (Matter of Trust), comic opera in one act, on a libretto by Sergio Massaron, Op. 64 (1973)
- La vendetta di Luzbel (The vendetta of Lucifer), lyric opera in one act and two tableaux, Op. 65 (1970/74) - originally Op. 48
- Tre Liriche (Three Poems) for soprano and string orchestra, Op. 66 (1974) - orchestration of Op. 1 ?
- Dannazione e Preghiera, for voice and piano, Op. 67 (1974–75) - orig. for mezzo-soprano and string orchestra, Op. 13 (1957)
- Chanson for soprano and guitar, Op. 69 (1975)
- Chanson for soprano, flute and guitar, Op. 70 (1975) - arrangement of the above
- Piazza della Musica n°1, operina didascalica for children's choir, 20 instruments and reciting voice, Op. 82 (1978) - orig. for 15 instruments and reciting voice, Op. 62 (1972)
- Little horse’s story, for piano four-hands (with reciting voice ad libitum), Op. 83 (1978)
- Memory, vocalise for soprano and piano, Op. 86 (1979)
- 3 Canti popolari (Three Popular Songs), for choir, Op. 87 (1979–80) - orig. for vocal trio a cappella, Op. 42 (1969)
- Il bambino di plastica, for choir, Op. 92 (1981) - also arranged for clarinet, piano and reciting voice, Op. 100 (1982)
- Il pupazzo di neve (The Snowman), musical fairy tale for 11 instruments and reciting voice, Op. 97 (1982)
- Il pupazzo di neve (The Snowman), musical fairy tale for piano and reciting voice, Op. 98 (1982) - arrangement of the above
- Il pupazzo di neve (The Snowman), musical fairy tale for piano four-hands and reciting voice, Op. 99 (1982) - arrangement of the above
- Il bambino di plastica, for clarinet, piano and reciting voice, Op. 100 (1982) - orig. for choir, Op. 92 (1981)
- Air for soprano, clarinet and piano, Op. 101 (1983)
- Air for soprano, flute, oboe, bassoon and piano, Op. 102 (1983) - arrangement of the above
- Sueno, for female choir, flute, piano and reciting voice, Op. 105 (1983)
- In Memoriam, cantata for reciting voice, choir and orchestra, on texts by Padre Crispino di Flumeri, Op. 108 (1984)
- 2 melologhi (Two melologue), for choir, Op. 116 (1988) - also arranged for female choir, reciting voice and orchestra (1993)
- Ave Maria for choir, 2 horns and string orchestra, Op. 119 (1989)
- Pater Noster for mixed choir and string orchestra, Op. 128 (1992)
- Il bambino di plastica, for clarinet in B-flat, bassoon, trumpet in C, trombone, percussion, violin, double bass and reciting voice, Op. 137 (1996) - arrangement of Op. 100
- Agnus Dei for four-voice choir, Op. 143 (1997)
- Miserere Mei Deus, for string orchestra and reciting voice, Op. 151 (1998)
- Songs, for soprano and string orchestra (or string quartet), Op. 156 (1999)
- Vocalizzo, for female choir and organ, Op. 157 (1999)
- Il bambino di plastica, for piano four-hands and reciting voice, Op. 165 (2000) - arrangement of Op. 100
- Notte, serene ombre… (Night, serene shadows...), lirica for mezzo-soprano solo, Op. 167 (2001)
- Antologia Rodari, for children's choir and piano, Op. 168 (2001)
- Marionette for flute, clarinet, piano and reciting voice (ad libitum), Op. 170 (2002) - orig. for piano four-hands, Op. 55 (1972); also arranged for orchestra, Op. 121 (1990)
- Jokes, melologue for 3 guitars and reciting voice, Op. 174 (2003)
- Missa brevis, for children's choir and string orchestra, Op. 208 (2008)
- Etna, for soprano and harp (on a text by A. Lia Lantieri), Op. 212 (2011) - also arranged for soprano, clarinet in B-flat and piano (2015) as Op. 238
- Da ridere (Laugh), tre liriche for tenor and piano, Op. 221 (2012–13)

== Discography ==
- Three Dances for two trumpets and strings, Concerto for harp and orchestra music barbara piano and chamber orchestra, Music for Strings for String Orchestra, Concertino for flute and string orchestra Orchestra Sinfonieta "of Radio Television of Bulgaria Simeon Shterev, flute; Susana Klintcharova, harp; Goleminov Kamen, Director CD PAN 3005.
- Divertissement for brass quintet, op. 90, Piano Sonata, Op. 3, Piccolo Concerto, Op 13 players. 138; Puppets Piano 4 hands, Op. 55; Quartet for flute, oboe, bassoon and piano op. 27, 3 pieces for bassoon and piano op. 30; Sextet for wind quintet and piano op. 140
- The Winds of Paradise directed by Claudio Parma, Italian Brass Quintet Brass Bim Bum; Duo Stefano Scarcella, Trovajoli Claudio, piano; Claudio Paradiso, Luciano Franca flute, oboe Zarb Francis, Francis Zanelti clarinet, bassoon Losavio Domenico, Andrea Mugnaini bassoon, horn Raffaele D'Aniello, piano CD PAN 3068.
