= Michelangelo Faggioli =

Italian lawyer and composer

Michelangelo Faggioli (1666–1733) was an Italian lawyer and celebrated amateur composer of humorous cantatas in Neapolitan dialect. A founder of a new genre of Neapolitan comedy, he was the composer of the opera buffa La Cilla in 1706.
