= Nicola Sabini =

Italian Baroque composer (c. 1675 – 1705)

Nicola Sabini (also Sabino; c. 1675 – 1705) was an Italian composer of the mid-Baroque period who spent his career in Naples. An influential figure in early Neapolitan opera buffa, his most important opera is the 1701 comedy Scherzo drammatico, Il mondo abbattuto.

== Life and career ==
Nicola Sabini, also known as Nicola Sabino, was born c. 1675, probably in Naples. He studied with Angelo Durante (uncle of the better known Francesco Durante) at the Conservatorio di Onofrio. In May 1699, Sabini succeeded his teacher as the Convervatorio's maestro di cappella. Possibly because of illness, he left his post in 1702, and died of tuberculosis three years later. Sabini was a member of the Congregazione de' Musici (Congregation of Musicians) in Naples.

An influential figure in the early history of opera buffa in Naples, Sabini's most important work was the 1701 scherzo drammatico (dramatic jest), Il mondo abbattuto. Written to a libretto by S. de Falco for the Feast of Saint Casimir, it premiered for the city's Congregazione de' Musici at the San Giorgio Maggiore. Only the opera's text survives, but by using both Tuscan and Neapolitan dialects, it created an influential model for future opera buffa. Sabini wrote a sacred opera, Innocenza trionfante ('Triumphant Innocence'), which included arias by his composer colleagues and premiered on 14 December 1704 in the Congregazione di St. Caterina, Celano. Other works that survive include a cantata in the Neapolitan dialect, Non cchiù Ciccillo mio, and the Canzone a voce sola per la Purificazione della Vergine (1696).
