= Virgilio Mortari =

Italian composer and teacher

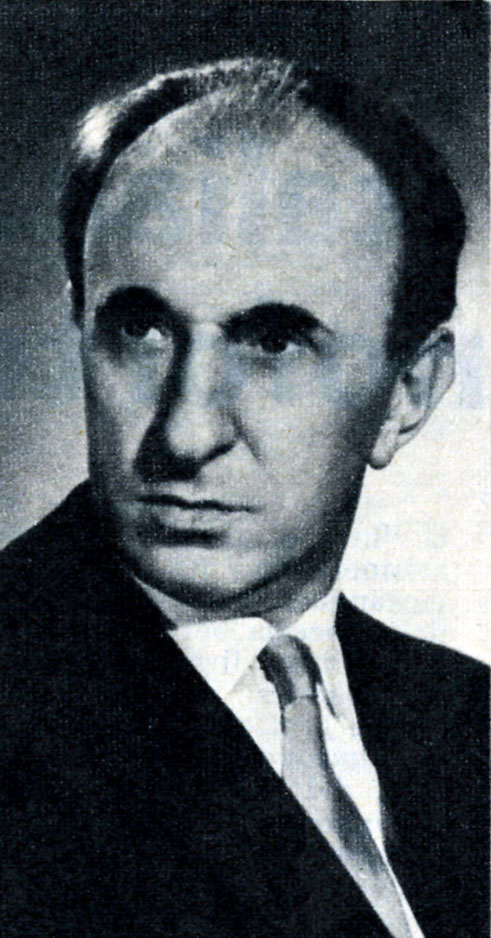
Virgilio Mortari

Virgilio Mortari (December 6, 1902 – September 5, 1993) was an Italian composer and teacher.

== Biography ==
Mortari was born in Passirana di Lainate, near Milan in 1902. He studied at the Milan Conservatory with Costante Adolfo Bossi and Ildebrando Pizzetti. He graduated from the Parma Conservatory in 1928, having studied piano and composition. Already in 1924 he had won first prize with his composition Sonata per pianoforte, violino e violoncello at the Società Italiana di Musica Contemporanea competition.

He was professor of composition at the Venice Conservatory from 1933 to 1940. From 1940 he was professor at the Accademia Nazionale di Santa Cecilia. He was artistic director of the Accademia Filarmonica Romana from 1944 to 1946 and from 1955 to 1959 director of Teatro La Fenice in Venice. In 1963 he became vice president of the Accademia Nazionale di Santa Cecilia.

Double Bass compositions include: Concerto per Franco Petracchi by Virgilio Mortari. He won the Euterpe, Marzotto and Montaigne prizes.
