= Gioseffo Guami =

Italian composer, organist and violinist (1542-1611)

Gioseffo Guami (27 January 1542 – 1611) (Gioseffo Giuseppe Guami or Gioseffo da Lucca) was an Italian composer, organist, violinist and singer of the late Renaissance Venetian School. He was a prolific composer of madrigals and instrumental music, and was renowned as one of the finest organists in Italy in the late 16th century; he was also the principal teacher of Adriano Banchieri.

== Life ==
He was born in Lucca, and was the brother of Francesco Guami (born 1543). Little is known about his early life, but he must have received some early training for he came to St. Mark's in Venice, one of the most prestigious musical institutions in Italy, in 1561; there he studied with Adrian Willaert and Annibale Padovano, and served as a singer. In 1568 he left Venice and went to Bavaria, serving as first organist at the court of Albrecht of Bavaria, the location of the famous Franco-Flemish composer Orlande de Lassus. In the early 1570s he returned to Italy, at least temporarily, and accompanied by Lassus at least once; and he was hired as organist in Lucca in 1579, where he stayed until 1582 or later. In 1585 he was working as maestro di cappella in Genoa. Precise details of his movements are uncertain until his return to St. Mark's, but it is certain that he was composing and acquiring fame as an organist during these years.

In 1588 he was appointed to the post of first organist at St. Mark's (there were two organists, who usually also served as composers, under the direction of the maestro di cappella, who at that time was Gioseffo Zarlino). When Zarlino died Guami returned to Lucca, possibly because he was not appointed as Zarlino's successor; in Lucca he was employed as the organist at the cathedral, where he stayed until he died.

== Works and influence ==
The major influences on Guami's sacred music style are from Willaert, his teacher at St. Mark's, and Cipriano de Rore, and later from Lassus; indeed the two composers may have been friends since they served together in Munich and evidently traveled together. In his secular music he was most progressive, using an unusual amount of chromaticism and modulation to distant keys, undoubtedly influenced by Nicola Vicentino.

Guami also wrote numerous instrumental canzonas; most likely he wrote organ music which has been lost (only one piece survives, in a collection by Girolamo Diruta). The canzonas are in the up-to-date Venetian style, antiphonal, ornamented, and using starkly different thematic material in different sections; however they contain an unusual level of motivic development for pre-Baroque music.

Guami was also important as a teacher, providing instruction to composers such as Adriano Banchieri, one of the key figures in the transition to the Baroque style. Vincenzo Galilei, the progressive music theorist, lutenist, and father of the astronomer, also wrote about Guami's music, talent and fame.

== References and further reading ==
- The New Grove Dictionary of Music and Musicians, ed. Stanley Sadie. 20 vol. London, Macmillan Publishers Ltd., 1980. ISBN 1-56159-174-2
- Gustave Reese, Music in the Renaissance. New York, W.W. Norton & Co., 1954. ISBN 0-393-09530-4
- Eleanor Selfridge-Field, Venetian Instrumental Music, from Gabrieli to Vivaldi. New York, Dover Publications, 1994. ISBN 0-486-28151-5
