= Baldassare Donato =

Italian composer and singer

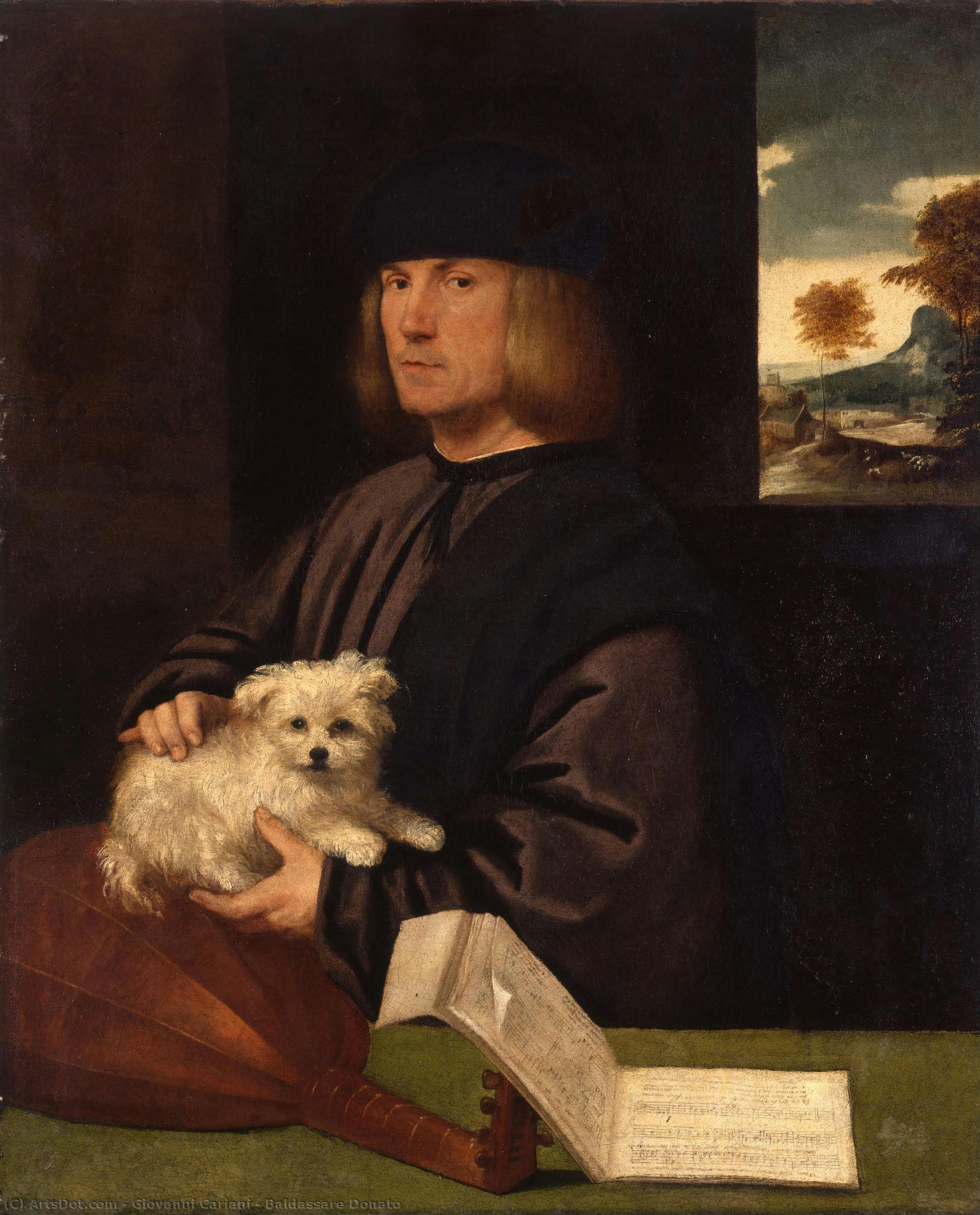
Painting of Baldassare Donato by Giovanni Cariani

Baldassare Donato (also Donati) (1525-1530 – June 1603) was an Italian composer and singer of the Venetian school of the late Renaissance. He was maestro di cappella of the prestigious St. Mark's Basilica at the end of the 16th century, and was an important figure in the development of Italian light secular music, especially the villanella.

== Life ==
Details of his early life are unavailable; it is not even known where he was born. The first record of Donato is as a singer at St. Mark's in Venice in 1550, and he was given charge of the musical training of the boys there in 1562. When Gioseffo Zarlino took over the post of maestro di cappella from Cipriano de Rore in 1565, Donato was demoted back to being a singer; conflict between the two men seems to have been a feature of life at St. Mark's, culminating in a climactic fight in 1569, publicly and scandalously, during the Feast of St. Mark. In 1577 Donato took a position at the Scuola Grande di S Rocco, another Venetian church with an impressive musical tradition and substantial performing ensemble; however he failed to get along with his employers there as well, resigning by 1580. In 1588 he became assistant maestro di cappella at St. Mark's, while Zarlino was still alive (whether because of reconcilement or politics is not clear), and in 1590 he took over the post of his former antagonist, holding it until his death in 1603.

== Music and influence ==
Donato represented a progressive trend in the Venetian school, which was already a progressive tradition compared to the other major contemporary Italian musical styles (especially as compared to the Roman School). The progressive trend in the Venetian school was represented by composers such as Donato, Giovanni Croce, and Andrea and Giovanni Gabrieli; the conservative trend involved composers and theorists such as Zarlino, Cipriano de Rore, and Claudio Merulo, who tended to follow the Franco-Flemish style which was predominant almost everywhere else in Europe until after mid-century.

Donato's sacred music is the most conservative portion of his output, usually using polyphony in the Palestrina style, but also using some of the grand polychoral effects of the Gabrielis. In spite of his evident disdain for Zarlino's conservatism, he clearly absorbed some of his style and teaching, as can be seen in his smooth mastery of counterpoint and Zarlinoesque use of dissonance, at least when he was deliberately composing in the Franco-Flemish style.

Probably his greatest significance to music history is in the development of a light secular form known as the villanella, a lighter form of madrigal, of Neapolitan origin. Some of these pieces may have been intended for dancing, and they were evidently popular. They are similar to the French chanson, often have a memorable melody in the topmost part, contain vigorous cross-rhythms, and avoid the polyphonic and chromatic complexity of the mid-century madrigal.

Donato also wrote madrigals in a more serious style, as well as psalm settings, motets, and ceremonial music.

== References and further reading ==
- Article "Baldassare Donato", in The New Grove Dictionary of Music and Musicians, ed. Stanley Sadie. 20 vol. London, Macmillan Publishers Ltd., 1980. ISBN 1-56159-174-2
- Gustave Reese, Music in the Renaissance. New York, W.W. Norton & Co., 1954. ISBN 0-393-09530-4
- Eleanor Selfridge-Field, Venetian Instrumental Music, from Gabrieli to Vivaldi. New York, Dover Publications, 1994. ISBN 0-486-28151-5 (Note: while this book contains nothing on Donato, it has detailed and readable background on the Venetian school and associated activity at St. Mark's.)
