= Giovanni Croce =

Italian composer

Giovanni Croce (Italian pronunciation: [dʒoˈvanni ˈkroːtʃe]; also Ioanne a Cruce Clodiensis, Zuanne Chiozotto; 1557 – 15 May 1609) was an Italian composer of the late Renaissance, of the Venetian School. He was particularly prominent as a madrigalist, one of the few among the Venetians other than Monteverdi and Andrea Gabrieli.

== Life ==
He was born in Chioggia, a fishing town on the Adriatic coast south of Venice, the same town as Gioseffo Zarlino, and he came to Venice early, becoming a member of the boys' choir at St. Mark's under Zarlino's direction by the time he was eight years old. Zarlino evidently found him in a choir in Chioggia Cathedral, and recruited him for St. Mark's. Croce may have been a parish priest at the church of Santa Maria Formosa, and he took holy orders in 1585; during this period he also served as a singer at St. Mark's. He evidently maintained some connection with Santa Maria Formosa, probably as a director of music, alongside his duties at St. Mark's.

After the death of Zarlino, he became assistant maestro di cappella; this was during the tenure of Baldassare Donato. When Donato died in 1603, Croce took over the principal job as maestro di cappella but the singing standards of the famous St. Mark's Cathedral declined under his direction, most likely due more to his declining health than his lack of musicianship. He died in 1609; the position of maestro di cappella went to Giulio Cesare Martinengo until 1613, at which time Monteverdi took the job.

== Music and influence ==
Croce wrote less music in the grand polychoral style than Andrea and Giovanni Gabrieli, although he left a grand mass for four choirs, composed for Ferdinand of Austria (the future Emperor Ferdinand II) and several triple-choir Psalm settings (only one of which has survived), and as a result his music has not maintained the same fame to the present day; however he was renowned as a composer at the time, and had a large influence on music both in Italy and abroad. As a composer of sacred music, he was mostly conservative, writing cori spezzati in the manner of Adrian Willaert, and parody masses more like the music composed by the members of the contemporary Roman School. However, later in his career, he wrote some music in a forward-looking stile concertato, which attempted to combine the innovations of Viadana with the grand Venetian polychoral manner. This posthumous collection, the Sacre Cantilene Concertate of 1610, is for 3, 5 or 6 solo voices, continuo and a 4-voice Ripieno which can be multiplied ad lib (presumably in different parts of the church). Most of Croce's sacred music is for double-choir: this includes three masses, two books of motets, and sets of music for Terce, Lauds and Vespers. Although most of his sacred music was written for the professional singers of St Mark's (including several pieces written for their participation in a freelance company of musicians under Croce's direction, who performed for the Scuole Grande of Venice) much of his music is technically simple: for that reason much of it, especially the secular music, has remained popular with amateurs. One collection, the motets for 4 voices of 1597, is clearly designed for less ambitious church choirs.

Croce is also credited with the first published continuo parts, many of his double-choir collections being issued either with a 'Basso per sonare nell'organo' or a 'Partidura' (or Spartidura) which indicated both choirs.

Stylistically, Croce was more influenced by Andrea Gabrieli than his nephew Giovanni, even though they were exact contemporaries; Croce preferred the emotional coolness, the Palestrinian clarity and the generally lighter character of Andrea's music. Croce was particularly important in the development of the canzonetta and the madrigal comedy, and wrote a large quantity of easily singable, popular, and often hilarious music. Some of his collections are satirical, for example setting to music ridiculous scenes at Venetian carnivals (Mascarate piacevoli et ridicolose per il carnevale, 1590), some of which are in dialect.

Croce was one of the first composers to use the term capriccio as a title for one of the canzonettas in his collection Triaca musicale (musical cure for animal bites) of 1595. Both this and the Mascarate piacevoli collections were intended to be sung in costumes and masks at Venetian carnivals.

His canzonettas and madrigals were influential in the Netherlands and in England, where they were reprinted in the second book of Musica transalpina (1597). Despite not being included in the first book of Musica transalpina (which had inaugurated the mania for madrigal composition in England), Croce's music was well received there. Thomas Morley specifically singled him out as a master composer; indeed, Croce may have been the biggest single influence on Morley. John Dowland visited him in Venice, and acknowledged Croce's influence in the preface to The First Book of Songs (1597).

== Media ==
Cantate Domino

== Sources and further reading ==
- Articles "Giovanni Croce, Canzonetta" in The New Grove Dictionary of Music and Musicians, ed. Stanley Sadie. 20 vol. London, Macmillan Publishers Ltd., 1980. ISBN 1-56159-174-2
- Gustave Reese, Music in the Renaissance. New York, W.W. Norton & Co., 1954. ISBN 0-393-09530-4
- The New Harvard Dictionary of Music, ed. Don Randel. Cambridge, Massachusetts, Harvard University Press, 1986. ISBN 0-674-61525-5
- Denis Arnold, Giovanni Gabrieli and the Music of the Venetian High Renaissance. London, Oxford University Press, 1979. ISBN 0-19-315232-0
- A complete edition of the sacred music of Croce, the Croce Quatercentenary Edition, is appearing in 14 volumes. Edited by Richard Charteris, Martin Morell and Michael Procter, the Edition is published by Edition Michael Procter (Weingarten, Baden). Details are at www.Croce-Edition.com and at www.Edition-MP.com. Volume I includes a new biography by Martin Morell.
