= Giulio Cesare Martinengo =

Italian composer

Giulio Cesare Martinengo (Italian pronunciation: [ˈdʒuːljo ˈtʃeːzare martiˈneŋɡo]; c. 1564/1568 – 10 July 1613) was an Italian composer and teacher of the late Renaissance and early Baroque Venetian School. He was the predecessor to Claudio Monteverdi at San Marco.

He probably came from Verona, and was the son of composer Gabriele Martinengo. Accounts giving his birthdate are conflicting: one from his mother claims he was born in 1564, but a document from the "house of the Accoliti" in Verona gives his age in 1583 as 15. He studied with his father in Verona, and in the 1590s he served at Verona Cathedral as a singer as well as a priest.

Martinengo is principally famous as the successor to Giovanni Croce, and predecessor to Claudio Monteverdi, to the post of maestro di cappella at San Marco in Venice, which was by far the most prestigious post in northern Italy. He was hired on 22 August 1609, at a pay of 200 ducats, after an audition, and on the recommendation of the Veronese. Martinengo's tenure was a failure; he was sick most of the time, and the standards of the choir and instrumentalists slipped badly, according to contemporary accounts. In addition, the establishment took on considerable debt and became disorganized and demoralized. Martinengo lacked the ability to manage the finances; according to the records of San Marco, he continually asked for advances on his salary, he was unable to pay the basilica's creditors, and on his death, he still owed the treasurer his back salary for several months. He died only four years after his appointment, and the basilica authorities were much relieved to be able to hire Claudio Monteverdi, who restored the musical establishment at San Marco to the magnificence it had lost.

Little of Martinengo's music has survived. One motet, Regnum mundi, is in the progressive stile concertato (lit. 'concerted style'), similar to contemporary works by Lodovico Grossi da Viadana. He also wrote three books of madrigals.

== References and further reading ==
- Gustave Reese, Music in the Renaissance. New York, W.W. Norton & Co., 1954. ISBN 0-393-09530-4
- Denis Arnold, Monteverdi. London, J.M. Dent & Sons Ltd, 1975. ISBN 0-460-03155-4
- Eleanor Selfridge-Field, Venetian Instrumental Music, from Gabrieli to Vivaldi. New York, Dover Publications, 1994. ISBN 0-486-28151-5
- Denis Arnold/Tiziana Morsanuto: "Giulio Cesare Martinengo", Grove Music Online ed. L. Macy (Accessed 13 November 2005), (subscription access)
