= Three Bathers =

Painting by Paul Cézanne

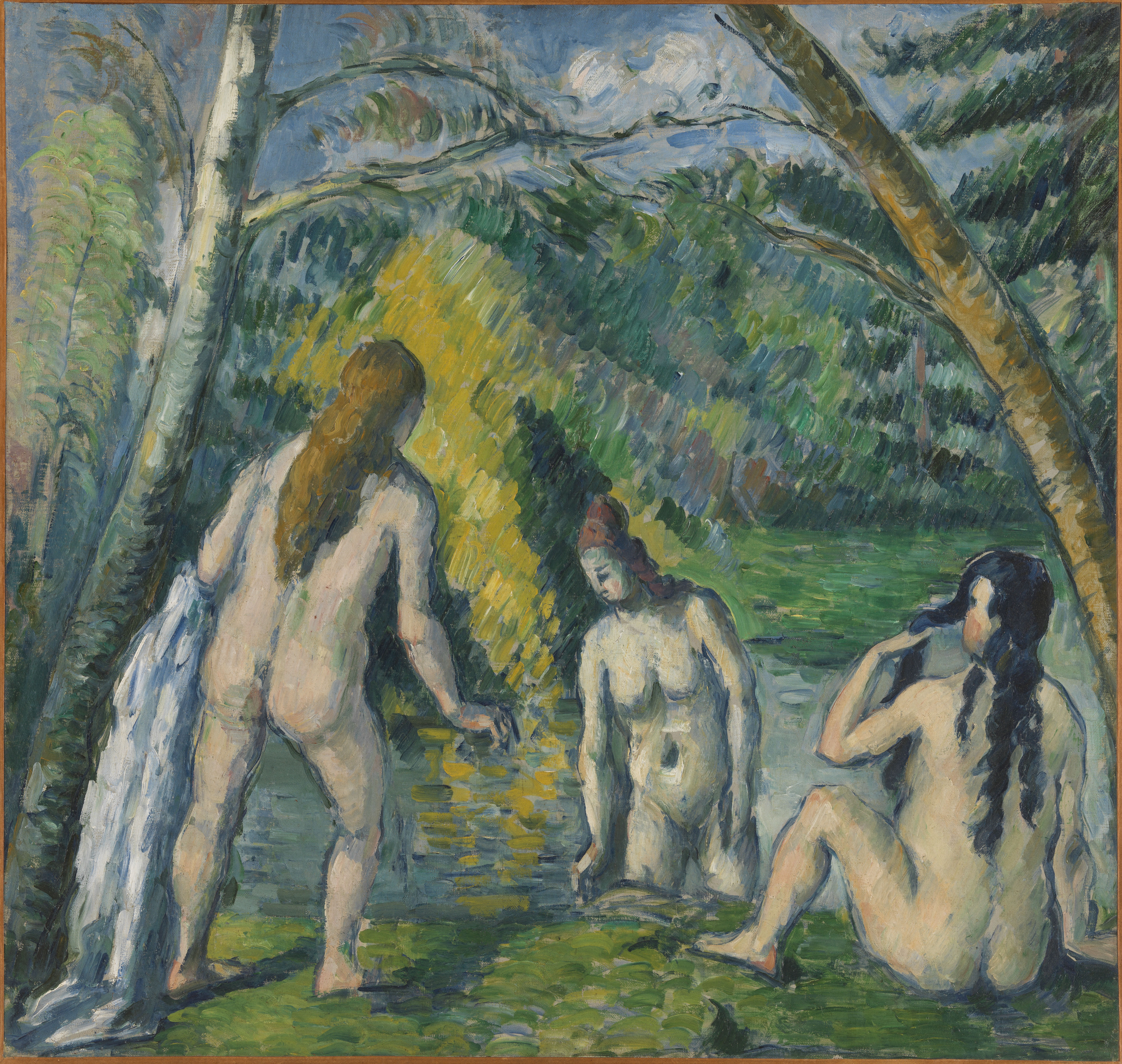
- Artist: Paul Cézanne
- Year: 1879–1882
- Medium: Oil on canvas
- Dimensions: 55 cm × 52 cm (22 in × 20 in)
- Location: Petit Palais, Paris

Three Bathers (French: Trois Baigneuses) is an oil-on-canvas painting by French artist Paul Cézanne, from 1879-1882. It is held in the Petit Palais, in Paris. It shows three bathing female nudes framed in an arch formed by two trees. Executed in a typically Impressionist style with short heavy brushstrokes and strong colours, the painting displays notable pictorial composition and form.

== Background ==
Bathers were a prominent theme in Cézanne’s work and preoccupied him throughout his lifetime. Over the course of his career, he created about 200 works that were devoted to male and female bathers, which he depicted in paintings, watercolours and drawings. The portrayal of nude women in an idealised setting is reminiscent of classical scenes of semi-nude figures, such as those portrayed in Venetian Renaissance art.

The artist Henri Matisse was a great admirer of Three Bathers and considered it to be a work of great importance. He stated, "I have drawn from it my faith and my perseverance". He acquired it at great financial cost from the influential art dealer Ambroise Vollard in 1899 and owned it for more than 30 years. He would often use the painting as an example when teaching his students at the Académie Matisse. Eventually he donated it to the Petit Palais in 1936.

== Description ==
In Three Bathers, structural form and pictorial composition are the artist's main concerns. The painting depicts three nude bathers, whose figures are stocky, rather than represented as figures of beauty. The painting's composition takes a pyramidal formation, with the three figures, who are blonde, dark and red-haired, having been framed by the two trees on either side of the painting. Light enters the wooded area from various angles, illuminating the bodies of the bathers and reflecting in the water. Cézanne used oblique, regular brushstrokes to create the structure of the image. He also used a canvas of almost square proportions to convey a sense of density and abundance within the composition.

== Other versions ==
Cézanne painted many scenes of bathers in his life, including Three Bathers c.1875 (private collection) and another version of the Three Bathers (1876–1877), which is on view at the Barnes Foundation in Philadelphia.

The artist Henry Moore was inspired to recreate Three Bathers as a bronze sculpture in 1978. He also created a charcoal drawing titled Cézanne's 'Bathers' from the Front, which is owned by The Henry Moore Foundation.

== See also ==
- List of paintings by Paul Cézanne
- Henri Matisse
