= Girolamo Diruta =

Italian composer, organist and music theorist

Girolamo Diruta (c. 1546 – 1624 or 1625) was an Italian organist, music theorist, and composer. He was famous as a teacher, for his treatise Il Transilvano (Venice, 1st part 1593; 2nd part 1609-10) on counterpoint, and for his part in the development of keyboard technique, particularly on the organ. He was born in Deruta, near Perugia.

== Biography ==
Diruta was born in Deruta in 1546 c. He became a friar minor conventual in the convent Perugia in 1566; later, from 1569 to 1574, he was in the convent of Correggio. Around 1578 he moved to Venice, where he met Claudio Merulo, Gioseffo Zarlino and Costanzo Porta (who was also a friar minor conventual), and he probably studied with each of them. Merulo mentioned Diruta in a prefatory letter to the Transilvano (1593), as one of his finest students.

From 1580 until 1585 he was organist at the Gubbio cathedral. He returned in Venice at the Frari convent, where he was organist from 1586 until 1589. By 1593 he was organist at Chioggia cathedral. In these year he dedicated the first part of his treatise Il Transilvano to Sigismund Bathory, prince of Transylvania.
Later he returned to live in Umbria. He was again organist at the Gubbio cathedral from 1604 to 1610.
In 1610 from Gubbio he dedicated the second part of his treatise Il Transilvano to Leonora Orsini Sforza, niece of Grand Duke Ferdinand I of Tuscany.
He died in Deruta in 1624 or 1625.

His nephew Agostino Diruta (c. 1595 – c. 1647) was also a composer, and his pupil.

== Works ==
Diruta's major work is a treatise in two parts on organ playing, counterpoint, and composition, entitled Il Transilvano (The Transylvanian) published for the first time in 1593; it is in the form of a dialog with Istvan de Josíka, a diplomat from Transylvania whom Diruta met during one of Josíka's missions to Italy. It is one of the first practical discussions of organ technique which differentiates organ technique from keyboard technique on other instruments. His fingerings largely follow the usual ones of his times: for example, his fingering for a C major scale never includes the thumb, and crosses the middle finger over the ring finger: his work is one of the earliest attempts in Italy to establish consistency in keyboard fingering.

As a contrapuntist, Diruta anticipates Fux in describing the different "species" of counterpoint: note against note, two notes against one, suspensions, four notes against one, and so forth. Unlike Fux, he defines a less-rigorous kind of counterpoint that was adequate for improvisation; for example it neither requires contrary motion nor prohibits successive perfect consonances. It describes contemporary keyboard practice well, as can be observed from the contemporary toccatas and canzonas of composers such as Merulo.

Diruta included many of his own compositions in Il Transilvano, and they are mostly didactic in nature, showing different kinds of figuration, and presenting different kinds of performance problems. These four toccate are among the earliest examples of the etude.

The Prima parte also includes toccatas by other composers of the time, chosen for their musical and didactic value: Claudio Merulo, Andrea Gabrieli, Giovanni Gabrieli, Luzzasco Luzzaschi, Antonio Romanini, Paolo Quagliati, Vincenzo Bellavere and Gioseffo Guami. The Seconda parte includes ricercares by Luzzaschi, Gabriele Fattorini and Adriano Banchieri.
