= Francesco Franceschi =

Italian printer (died c.1599)

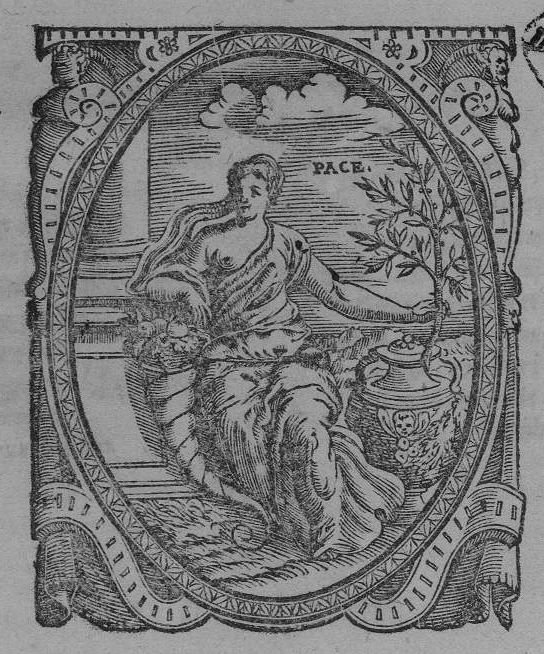
Franceschi's mark (BEIC)

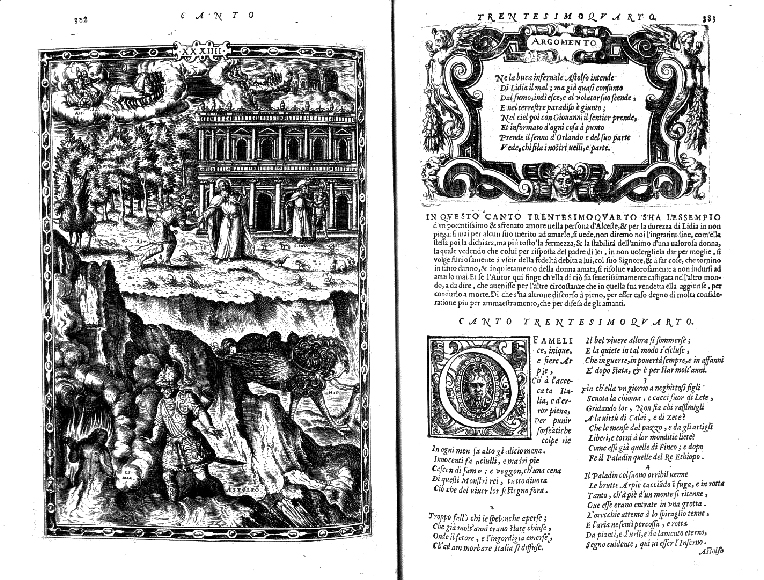
Page from Francesco Franceschi's 1565 edition of Orlando Furioso.

Francesco Franceschi (died c. 1599) was a printer in the Italian Renaissance. He came from Siena, but his work was done in Venice.

Franceschi was known for the high quality of his engravings, which were done using metal plates rather than wooden, a common inexpensive alternative in the period. Evelyn Tribble describes in detail his 1565 edition of Ludovico Ariosto's Orlando Furioso, which was influential for some English publishers, and which is heavily and ornately illustrated, including an engraving before every canto and an engraved frame surrounding the argument (Tribble 88).

Franceschi was also known for printing music. According to the New Grove, he printed the works of Gioseffo Zarlino and several volumes of writing on music. Two probable relatives, Giovanni Antonio de' Franceschi (who worked in both Palermo and Venice) and Giacomo Franceschi of Venice, printed music as well.

Francesco Franceschi's marks

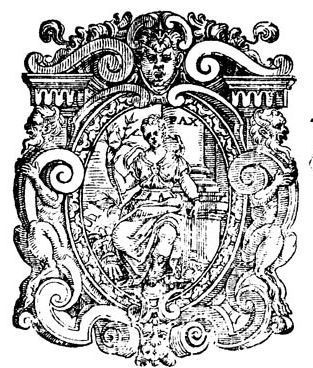

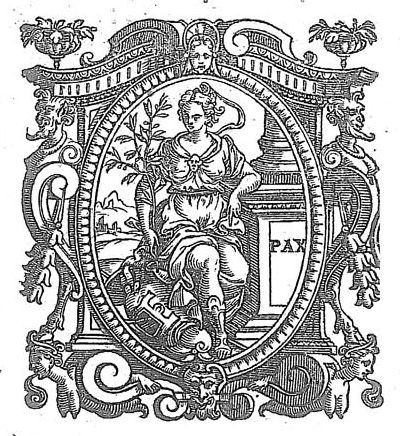
