= Vincenzo Bellavere =

Italian composer

- Born: 1540-1541
- Died: 29 August 1587
- Occupation: composer

Vincenzo Bellavere (also Bell'haver, Bell'aver, Belaver) (c.1540-1541 – 29 August 1587) was an Italian composer of the Venetian School. While a fairly minor figure in the Venetian School, he was a competent composer of madrigals and wrote a few works in the grand Venetian polychoral style.

== Biography ==
Nothing is known about him prior to his appearance in Padua in 1567 as an organist at Crosieri Cathedral. That same year he tried to gain the prestigious job as first organist of the cathedral there. In 1568 he acquired the position of primary organist at the Scuola Grande di San Rocco, a Venetian establishment almost as prestigious as St. Mark's; he held this post until 1584 at which time he returned to Padua to take the post at the cathedral that he at first failed to win. In December 1585 he was fired from his job in Padua, probably because of an unexcused absence, but he returned to Venice to become organist of yet another Venetian church, Santo Stefano. In 1586 he became first organist at St. Mark's, the position just vacated by Andrea Gabrieli; thus he was first organist alongside Giovanni Gabrieli, who was second organist. Unfortunately Bellavere died after only holding this post for nine months.

Bellavere was a talented composer and could have become a major member of the Venetian school, had his career not been cut short; possibly he died fairly young, though reliable information on his age is missing.

== Works ==
Bellavere wrote, besides keyboard works (being an organist), choral works, notably madrigals in a light style reminiscent of Andrea Gabrieli, as well as four motets and two settings of the Magnificat.

His last music shows a progressive use of the multiple choir and instrument group style that was to make Giovanni Gabrieli famous, and which is the hallmark of the Venetian School.

== References and further reading ==
- "Vincenzo Bellavere," in The New Grove Dictionary of Music and Musicians, ed. Stanley Sadie. 20 vol. London, Macmillan Publishers Ltd., 1980. ISBN 1-56159-174-2
- Eleanor Selfridge-Field, Venetian Instrumental Music, from Gabrieli to Vivaldi. New York, Dover Publications, 1994. ISBN 0-486-28151-5
- Denis Arnold/Serena Dal Belin Peruffo: "Vincenzo Bellavere", Grove Music Online ed. L. Macy (Accessed November 13, 2005), (subscription access)
- HOASM - biography & discography
