= Costanzo Porta =

Italian composer

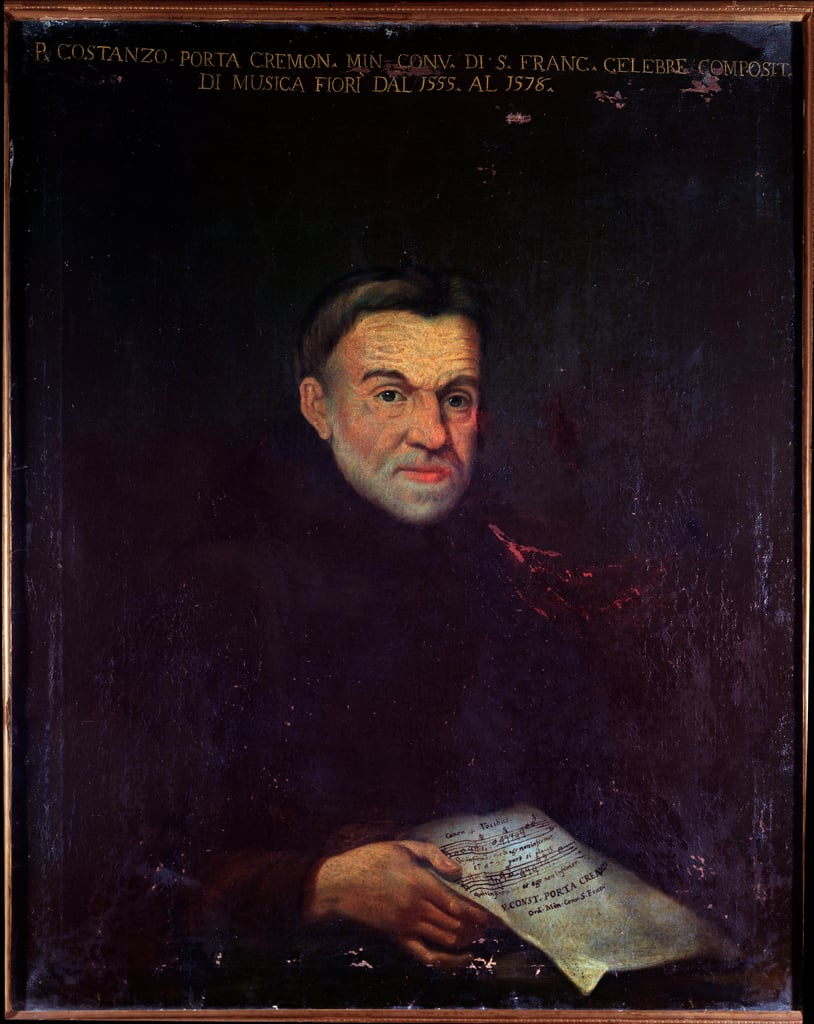
Costanzo Porta, anonymous portrait in Bologna's Civico Museo Musicale.

Costanzo Porta (1528 or 1529 – 19 May 1601) was an Italian composer of the Renaissance, and a representative of what is known today as the Venetian School. He was highly praised throughout his life both as a composer and a teacher, and had a reputation especially as an expert contrapuntist.

== Biography ==
Porta was born in Cremona. Details of his early life are slim, but he probably was educated at the Convent Porta San Luca in Cremona. Around 1550 he is thought to have studied with Adrian Willaert, who was maestro di cappella at St. Mark's in Venice; while he was there he met Claudio Merulo, who was also a student; they remained close friends throughout their lives. In 1552 Porta became maestro di cappella at Osimo Cathedral; in 1565 he took a position in Padua briefly, but took a more important position in Ravenna the next year, where he was hired to build an entirely new music practice at the cathedral. By 1580 his services were much in demand, and there was competition for him; he declined an offer from Milan, moving instead between positions in several cities. In addition he had become a renowned teacher by this time, and numerous composers of the next generation learned their contrapuntal skills from Porta. His last years were spent in Padua, and they were clearly difficult. Musical standards there began to decline, and he faced in addition the burden of ill health and the jealousy of the man who was eventually to replace him. He died in Padua. He is buried in the Basilica of Saint Anthony of Padua.

== Style ==
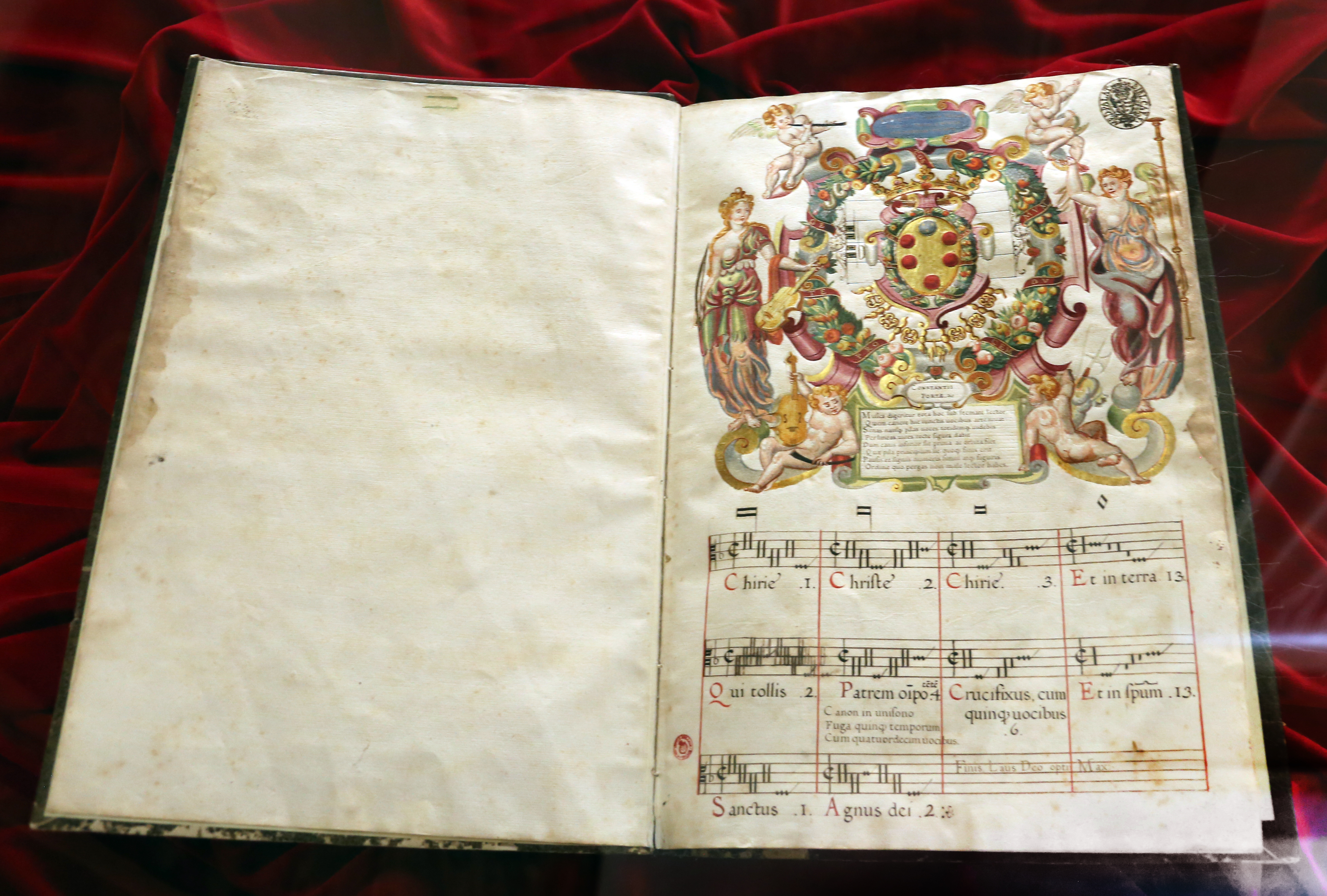
Missa Ducalis, 1565 ca.

Most of Porta's output is sacred music, especially motets. He published at least eight books of motets, one of which is known to be lost, as well as books of masses, introits, and a huge cycle of hymns for Vespers.

Porta's music is even more polyphonic than that of Gombert, and he showed a liking for academic, even severe contrapuntal devices, although they are used so skillfully that the text can always be clearly understood. Often his music uses strict canons; one motet from his book of 52 motets from 1580, in seven voices, has no less than four of the voices entirely derived canonically. Another motet from this same book is a mensuration canon, that most difficult of all contrapuntal forms to carry off. While many composers were reacting to the strictures of the Council of Trent against excessive polyphonic practice, Porta evidently felt unobliged to follow them; perhaps he had sufficient confidence in his skill in conveying the text. His music is as carefully controlled as that of Palestrina, with cautious use of dissonance and chromaticism, while displaying polyphonic virtuosity to a degree uncommon in other composers of sacred music at the end of the 16th century.

Some of the later motets use polychoral writing extensively. Although Porta was not in Venice in the late part of the century, where this style had become famous (see Venetian polychoral style), he had spent years there as a student studying with Willaert, and the influence clearly lasted throughout his life. Most likely he was familiar with the current practice in Venice, and adopted some of the innovations which worked best with his highly learned style.

Porta also wrote madrigals. Many of these were clearly intended for specific occasions, such as weddings and large social events in the families of his employers; they are in a much simpler style than his sacred works, much in keeping with contemporary practice.

== Sources ==
- Reese, Gustave (1954). Music in the Renaissance. New York: W.W. Norton & Co. ISBN 0-393-09530-4.
- "Costanzo Porta". The New Grove Dictionary of Music and Musicians, ed. Stanley Sadie. London: Macmillan Publishers. 1980. ISBN 1-56159-174-2.
- Lillian Pruett: "Costanzo Porta", Grove Music Online, ed. L. Macy (Accessed December 5, 2007), (subscription access)
