= Annibale Padovano =

Italian composer

Annibale Padovano (1527 – March 15, 1575) was an Italian composer and organist of the late Renaissance Venetian School. He was one of the earliest developers of the keyboard toccata.

== Life ==
Padovano was born in Padua — hence his name — but little is known about his early life. He first appears at St. Mark's in Venice on November 30, 1552, when he was hired as first organist at an annual salary of 40 ducats. He stayed at this post until 1565. St. Mark's at this time also began to employ a second organist (it was Claudio Merulo for the last eight years of Padovano's tenure), which allowed two simultaneous, spatially separated organs to perform in the huge space of the cathedral: this was a key development in music of the Venetian school, which was already using spatially separated choirs of voices. Merulo took over the job of first organist when Padovano left.

In 1566, Padovano left Venice to go to the Habsburg court in Graz. Many Venetian musicians left their native area to seek their fortunes in Habsburg domains, which generally remained friendly to Venice. Padovano became the director of music at Graz in 1570, and died there five years later.

== Music and influence ==
Although Padovano published a book of motets, a book of masses, and two books of madrigals, he is mainly remembered for his instrumental music. He was a notable early composer of ricercars, a predecessor of the fugue; many of the themes he used derived from plainchant, but he included considerable ornamentation in the melodic lines. In addition he often broke the theme up for motivic development in a surprisingly "modern" way, anticipating the developmental techniques of the common practice period.

Probably his most famous compositions are his toccatas, which were perhaps the earliest examples of the toccata in its more modern sense as an improvisatory, highly ornamented piece. Usually he included imitative interpolations between improvisatory sections, and also meter changes from duple to triple, anticipating later music of the Venetian school.

While in Bavaria he wrote an enormous mass for 24 voices, which makes use of three choirs of eight voices each. This composition was likely performed for the wedding of Duke Wilhelm V of Bavaria to Renata of Lorraine. This piece has been recorded by the Huelgas Ensemble, led by Paul Van Nevel.

== References and further reading ==
- Eleanor Selfridge-Field, Venetian Instrumental Music, from Gabrieli to Vivaldi. New York, Dover Publications, 1994. ISBN 0-486-28151-5
- "Annibale Padovano", in The New Grove Dictionary of Music and Musicians, ed. Stanley Sadie. 20 vol. London, Macmillan Publishers Ltd., 1980. ISBN 1-56159-174-2
- Gustave Reese, Music in the Renaissance. New York, W.W. Norton & Co., 1954. ISBN 0-393-09530-4
