= Gioseffo Zarlino =

Italian music theorist and composer (1517–1590)

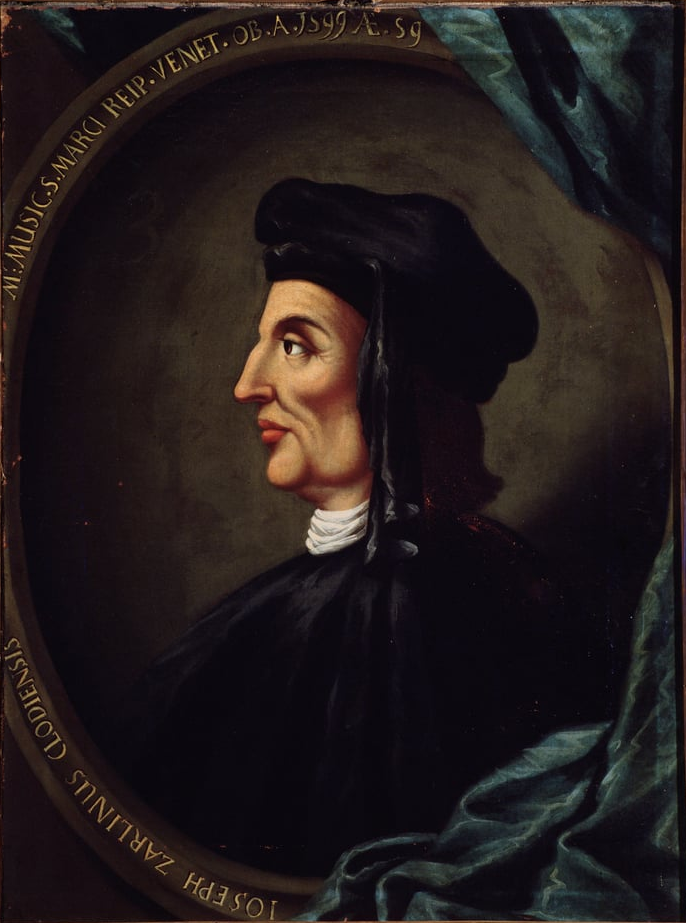
1599 painting of Zarlino by an unknown artist

Gioseffo Zarlino (31 January or 22 March 1517 – 4 February 1590) was an Italian music theorist and composer of the Renaissance. He made a large contribution to the theory of counterpoint as well as to musical tuning.

== Life and career ==
Zarlino was born in Chioggia, near Venice. His early education was with the Franciscans, and he later joined the order himself. In 1536 he was a singer at Chioggia Cathedral, and by 1539 he not only became a deacon, but also principal organist. In 1540 he was ordained, and in 1541 went to Venice to study with the famous contrapuntist and maestro di cappella of Saint Mark's, Adrian Willaert.

In 1565, on the resignation of Cipriano de Rore, Zarlino took over the post of maestro di cappella of St. Mark's, one of the most prestigious musical positions in Italy, and held it until his death. While maestro di cappella he taught some of the principal figures of the Venetian school of composers, including Claudio Merulo, Girolamo Diruta, Giovanni Croce, the famous reactionary polemicist Giovanni Artusi, as well as Vincenzo Galilei, the father of the astronomer Galileo Galilei.

== Works and influence ==
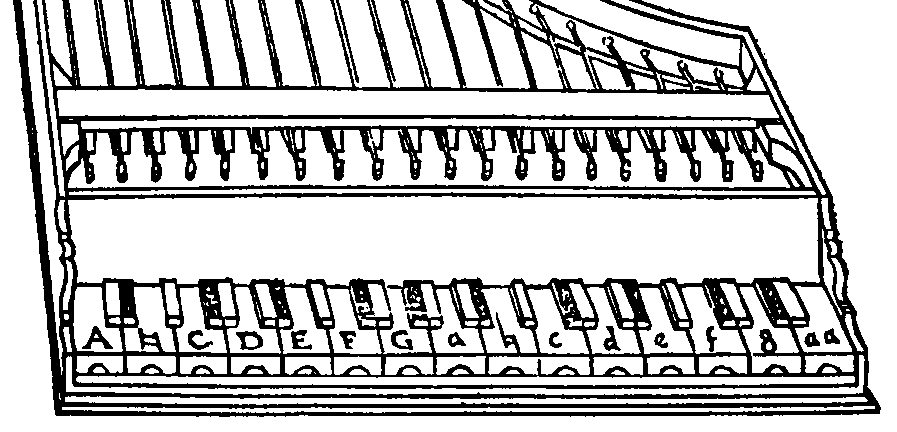
Illustration from Le istitutioni harmoniche, a keyboard with 19 keys per octave.

While he was a moderately prolific composer, and his motets are polished and display a mastery of canonic counterpoint, his principal claim to fame was his work as a theorist. While Pietro Aaron may have been the first theorist to describe a version of meantone, Zarlino seems to have been the first to do so with exactitude, describing 2/7-comma meantone in his Le istitutioni harmoniche in 1558. Zarlino also described the 1/4-comma meantone and 1/3-comma meantone, considering all three temperaments to be usable. In more recent times, these have been approximated by the 50- 31- and 19-tone equal temperaments, respectively. In his Dimostrationi harmoniche of 1571, he revised the numbering of modes to make the finales of the mode conform to the notes of the natural hexachord. He also wrote a treatise by the name of Sopplimenti Musicali, published in 1588, dedicated to Pope Sixtus V .

Zarlino was the first to theorize the primacy of triad over interval as a means of structuring harmony. His exposition of just intonation based on proportions within the "Senario" (1, 2, 3, 4, 5, 6) and 8 is a departure from the previously established Pythagorean diatonic system as passed on by Boethius. See: Ptolemy's intense diatonic scale. He was also one of the first theorists to offer an explanation for the prohibition of parallel fifths and octaves in counterpoint, and to study the effect and harmonic implications of the false relation.

Zarlino's writings, primarily published by Francesco Franceschi, spread throughout Europe at the end of the 16th century. Translations and annotated versions were common in France, Germany, as well as in the Netherlands among students of Sweelinck, thus influencing the next generation of musicians who represented the early Baroque style.

Zarlino's compositions are more conservative in idiom than those of many of his contemporaries. His madrigals avoid the homophonic textures commonly used by other composers, remaining polyphonic throughout, in the manner of his motets. His works were published between 1549 and 1567, and include 41 motets, mostly for five and six voices, and 13 secular works, mostly madrigals, for four and five voices. His 10 motets on the Song of Songs used the text of Isidoro Chiari's translation of the Bible.

== Recordings ==
- Gioseffo Zarlino, Canticum Canticorum Salomonis. Michael Noone, Ensemble Plus Ultra. GCD921406
- "Zarlino: Modulationes sex vocum", Singer Pur, OEHMS CLASSICS 873 (2013)

== Sources ==
- Article "Gioseffo Zarlino", in The New Grove Dictionary of Music and Musicians, ed. Stanley Sadie. 20 vol. London, Macmillan Publishers Ltd., 1980. ISBN 1-56159-174-2
- Reese, Gustave (1959). Music in the Renaissance (revised ed.). New York: W. W. Norton & Company. ISBN 978-0-393-09530-2.
- Gioseffo Zarlino, Istituzioni armoniche, tr. Oliver Strunk, in Source Readings in Music History. New York, W.W. Norton & Co., 1950.

Corwin, Lucille. "Le Istitutioni Harmoniche" of Gioseffo Zarlino, Part 1: A Translation with Introduction, City University of New York, 2008.
Zarlino, Gioseffo. The Art of Counterpoint: Part Three of "Le Istitutioni Harmoniche". Translated by Guy A. Marco and Claude V. Palisca. Yale University Press, 1968.
Zarlino, Gioseffo. On the Modes: Part Four of Le Istitutioni Harmoniche, 1558. Edited by Claude V. Palisca, Translated by Vered Cohen, Yale University Press, 1983.
