= Denis Arnold =

British musicologist

Arnold in 1978.

Denis Midgley Arnold CBE (Sheffield, 15 December 1926 – Budapest, 28 April 1986) was a British musicologist.

== Biography ==
After being employed in the extramural department of Queen's University, Belfast, he became a Lecturer in Music at the University of Hull, and from 1969 to 1975 was Professor of Music at The University of Nottingham. From 1975 he was Heather Professor of Music at Oxford University. He served as editor of Music & Letters.

He is best known for his editing of The New Oxford Companion to Music (1983, Oxford University Press), which under his editorship grew to a two-volume work of some 2000 pages, with a broader coverage than Percy Scholes' original; and for his work on the music of Monteverdi, Marenzio and Giovanni Gabrieli. A frequent broadcaster, he also reviewed a great many recordings (mostly in the field of Renaissance music) for Gramophone. The Denis Arnold Hall at the University of Oxford and the Denis Arnold Music Library at the University of Nottingham are both named after him.

Arnold died on 28 April 1986 in Budapest, Hungary.
