= Andrea Gabrieli =

Italian composer and organist (1532/1533–1585)

- Born: 1532/1533; Venice, Republic of Venice
- Died: 30 August 1585; Venice, Republic of Venice
- Education: St Mark's Basilica
- Occupations: Composer; organist
- Years active: c. 1550s–1585
- Notable work: Sacrae Cantiones; Primus Liber Missarum; Concerti di Andrea et di Gio. Gabrieli
- Style: Renaissance
- Movement: Venetian School
- Relatives: Giovanni Gabrieli (nephew)

Andrea Gabrieli (1532/1533 – August 30, 1585) was an Italian composer and organist of the late Renaissance. The uncle of the somewhat more famous Giovanni Gabrieli, he was the first internationally renowned member of the Venetian School of composers, and was extremely influential in spreading the Venetian style in Italy as well as in Germany.

== Early life ==
Details on Gabrieli's early life are uncertain. He was probably a native of Venice, most likely the parish of S. Geremia. He may have been a pupil of Adrian Willaert at St. Mark's in Venice at an early age.

== Career ==
There is some evidence that he spent time in Verona in the early 1550s, due to a connection with Vincenzo Ruffo, who worked there as maestro di cappella – Ruffo published one of Gabrieli's madrigals in 1554, and Gabrieli also wrote some music for a Veronese academy. Gabrieli is known to have been organist in Cannaregio between 1555 and 1557, at which time he competed unsuccessfully for the post of organist at St. Mark's.

In 1562 he went to Germany, where he visited Frankfurt am Main and Munich; while there he met and became friends with Orlande de Lassus, one of the most wide-ranging composers of the entire Renaissance, who wrote secular songs in French, Italian, and German, as well as abundant Latin sacred music. This musical relationship proved immensely fruitful for both composers: while Lassus certainly learned from the Venetian, Gabrieli took back to Venice numerous ideas he learned while visiting Lassus in Bavaria, and within a short time was composing in most of the current idioms, including one which Lassus entirely avoided: purely instrumental music.

In 1566, Gabrieli was appointed organist at St. Mark's Basilica, one of the most prestigious musical posts in northern Italy, a position he held for the remainder of his life. During this period he established a reputation as one of the leading composers of his time. The distinctive acoustical properties of St. Mark's informed the development of his ceremonial compositional style, which has been closely associated with the emergence of the polychoral style and the stile concertato, two developments that contributed to the formation of the Baroque era in music.

His duties at St. Mark's clearly included composition, for he wrote a great deal of music for ceremonial affairs, some of considerable historical interest. He provided the music for the festivities accompanying the celebration of the victory over the Turks in the Battle of Lepanto (1571); he also composed music for the visit of several princes from Japan (1585).

Late in his career he also became famous as a teacher. Prominent among his students were his nephew Giovanni Gabrieli; the music theorist Lodovico Zacconi; Hans Leo Hassler, who carried the concertato style to Germany; and many others.

== Death ==
The date and circumstances of his death were not known until the 1980s, when the register containing his death date was found. Dated August 30, 1585, it includes the notation that he was "about 52 years old"; his approximate birth date has been inferred from this. His position at St. Mark's was not filled until the end of 1586, and a large amount of his music was published posthumously in 1587.

== Works ==
Gabrieli was a prolific and versatile composer, and wrote a large amount of music, including sacred and secular vocal music, music for mixed groups of voices and instruments, and purely instrumental music, much of it for the huge, resonant space of St. Mark's. His works include over a hundred motets and madrigals, as well as a smaller number of instrumental works.

His early style is indebted to Cipriano de Rore, and his madrigals are representative of mid-century trends. Even in his earliest music, however, he had a liking for homophonic textures at climaxes, foreshadowing the grand style of his later years. After his meeting with Lassus in 1562, his style changed considerably, and the Netherlander became the strongest influence on him.

Once Gabrieli was working at St. Mark's, he began to turn away from the Franco-Flemish contrapuntal style which had dominated the music of the 16th century, instead exploiting the sonorous grandeur of mixed instrumental and vocal groups playing antiphonally in the great basilica. His music of this time uses repetition of phrases with different combinations of voices at different pitch levels; although instrumentation is not specifically indicated, it can be inferred; he carefully contrasts texture and sonority to shape sections of music in a way which was unique, and which defined the Venetian style for the next generation.

Not everything Gabrieli wrote was for St. Mark's, though. He provided the music for one of the earliest revivals of an ancient Greek drama in Italian translation: Oedipus tyrannus, by Sophocles, for which he wrote the music for the choruses, setting separate lines for different groupings of voices. It was produced at the inauguration of the Teatro Olimpico, Vicenza, 1585.

Evidently Andrea Gabrieli was reluctant to publish much of his own music, and his nephew Giovanni Gabrieli published much of it after his uncle's death.

== Media ==
Ricercar del Sesto Tuono
Performed by Ulrich Metzner

== Editions ==
- Sacrae Cantiones, Venezia, Angelo Gardano 1565, modern edition Verlag C. Hofius, Ammerbuch (Germany) 2013, ISMN 979-0-50248-001-1
- Il Primo Libro di Madrigali a cinque voci, Venezia, Angelo Gardano 1566, modern edition Ricordi, Milano 2008
- Il Secondo Libro di Madrigali a cinque voci, Venezia, Angelo Gardano 1570, modern edition Ricordi, Milano 1996
- Primus Liber Missarum, Venezia, Angelo Gardano 1572, modern edition Verlag C. Hofius, Ammerbuch 2014, ISMN 979-0-50248-000-4.
- Libro Primo de Madrigali a tre voci, modern edition Ricordi, Milano 1999
- Ecclesiasticum Cantionum quatuor vocum omnibus sanctorum solemnitatibus deservientium. Liber primus, Venezia, Angelo Gardano 1576, modern edition Ricordi, Milano 2001
- Opere edite in vita: Psalmi Davidici, qui poenitentiales nuncupantur, tum omnis generis instrumentorum, Venezia, Angelo Gardano 1583, modern edition Ricordi, Milano 1988
- Opera postume. Concerti di Andrea et di Gio. Gabrieli, Venezia, Angelo Gardano 1587, modern edition Ricordi, Milano 1989
- Chori in musica composti sopra li chori della tragedia di Edippo Tiranno: recitati in Vicenza l'anno MDLXXXV, Venezia, Angelo Gardano 1588, modern edition Ricordi, Milano 1995
- Il terzo Libro de Madrigali a cinque voci, con alcuni di Giovanni Gabrieli, Venezia, Angelo Gardano 1589, modern edition Ricordi, Milano 2012
- Madrigali et ricecari a quattro voci, Venezia, Angelo Gardano 1589/90, modern edition Ricordi, Milano 2012
- Le composizioni vocali di Andrea Gabrieli in intavolature per tastiera e liuto, modern edition Ricordi, Milano 1993/1999
- Complete Keyboard Works (edited by Giuseppe Clericetti), 6 Vol. + Critical Report, Wien 1997-99, Doblinger (Diletto Musicale 1141-46, 09671).
