= Gustave Reese =

American musicologist (1899–1977)

- Born: November 29, 1899; New York, NY, US
- Died: September 7, 1977 (aged 77); Berkeley, California, US

Academic background
- Education: New York University

Academic work
- Discipline: Early music
- Institutions: American Musicological Society; G. Schirmer; Carl Fischer Music

Gustave Reese (/riːs/ REESS; November 29, 1899 – September 7, 1977) was an American musicologist and teacher. Reese is known mainly for his work on medieval and Renaissance music, particularly with his two publications Music in the Middle Ages (1940) and Music in the Renaissance (1954); these two books remain the standard reference works for these two eras, with complete and precise bibliographical material, allowing for almost every piece of music mentioned to be traced back to a primary source.

== Early life and education ==
Reese was born in New York City on November 29, 1899. He was an avid scholar and had interests in many areas outside music, including art, architecture, and literature. He studied law at New York University, graduating in 1921. Though he was admitted to the New York State Bar, he opted to re-enroll and pursue a Bachelor of Music from NYU, which he received in 1930.

== Career ==
In 1927, however, he was already teaching classes at the university in medieval and Renaissance music. He continued teaching there intermittently until 1974, and he became Professor Emeritus in 1973. He also served as a visiting professor at a number of universities, including Harvard, Duke, UCLA, USC, Michigan, Oxford and the Juilliard School of Music. At his death he was still leading doctoral seminars in the Graduate School of the City University of New York. He was a founder-member of the American Musicological Society (AMS) from 1934, serving as its first secretary (1934–1946). He became vice-president in 1946 and president of the organization in 1950. He has also held positions in the International Musicological Society (IMS), the Renaissance Society of America, and the Plainsong and Medieval Music Society.

Also active in the music publishing industry, he headed the publication department of G. Schirmer (1940–1945) and was also director of publication at Carl Fischer (1945–1955). Furthermore, he was editor of The Musical Quarterly from 1944 to 1945.

Gustave Reese had an impact on many generations of music students through his passionate and insightful teaching. He left behind a legacy in Music in the Middle Ages and Music in the Renaissance. These two pillars have incited a revival of interest and scholarship in the areas of early music. He is often perceived to have 'raised the bar' of musicological scholarship with his thorough research, intellectual rigor and comprehensive bibliographies. He commissioned other people to contribute specialist sections to these books, such as Igor Buketoff's piece on Russian chant in Music in the Middle Ages.

== Personal life ==
Reese married Fine Arts administrator and cookbook author and editor Carol Truax in 1974. He died, aged 77, in Berkeley, California.

== Publications ==
=== Books ===
- Reese, Gustave (1940). Music in the Middle Ages: With an Introduction on the Music of Ancient Times. Lanham: W. W. Norton & Company. ISBN 978-0-393-09750-4.
- —— (1954). Music in the Renaissance. New York: W. W. Norton & Company. ISBN 978-0-393-09530-2.
- Fourscore Classics of Music Literature: A Guide to Selected Original Sources on Theory and Other Writings on Music Not Available in English. New York, Da Capo Press, 1970. ISBN 0-306-71620-8

=== Articles ===
- Reese, Gustave (January 1934). "The First Printed Collection of Part-Music: (The Odhecaton)". The Musical Quarterly. 20 (1): 39–76. doi:10.1093/mq/XX.1.39. JSTOR 738710.
- Reese, Gustave. "Josquin Desprez (biography)" The New Grove Dictionary of Music and Musicians, ed. Stanley Sadie. London, Macmillan, 1980. (20 vol.) ISBN 1-56159-174-2.
- Macey, Patrick; Noble, Jeremy; Dean, Jeffrey; Reese, Gustave (2011) [2001]. "Josquin (Lebloitte dit) des Prez". Grove Music Online. Oxford: Oxford University Press. doi:10.1093/gmo/9781561592630.article.14497. ISBN 978-1-56159-263-0. (subscription, Wikilibrary access, or UK public library membership required)

=== Others ===
- Reese, Gustave; Noble, Jeremy; Lockwood, Lewis; Owens, Jessie Ann; Haar, James; Kerman, Joseph; Stevenson, Robert (1984). The New Grove High Renaissance Masters: Josquin, Palestrina, Lassus, Byrd, Victoria. The New Grove Dictionary of Music and Musicians: The Composer Biography Series. London: Macmillan. ISBN 0-393-30093-5.
- Essays in Musicology in Honor of Dragan Plamenac on his 70th Birthday. Pittsburgh, University of Pittsburgh Press, c1969. ISBN 0-8229-1098-5
- A Compendium of Musical Practice. New York, Dover Publications, 1973. ISBN 0-486-20912-1

== Sources ==
- Haar, James (2001). "Reese, Gustave". Grove Music Online. Oxford: Oxford University Press. doi:10.1093/gmo/9781561592630.article.23052. ISBN 978-1-56159-263-0. (subscription, Wikilibrary access, or UK public library membership required)
- Kozinn, Allan (September 11, 2001). "Igor Buketoff, 87, Conductor And Expert on Rachmaninoff". The New York Times.
- Roesner, Edward H. (October 1977). "Gustave Reese (1899-1977)". The Musical Quarterly. 63 (4): 579–581. doi:10.1093/mq/LXIII.4.579. JSTOR 741726.
- "Gustave Reese, Honorary Head Of the Musicologicai Society, 77". The New York Times. September 13, 1977.
