= Emma Calvé =

French operatic soprano (1858-1942)

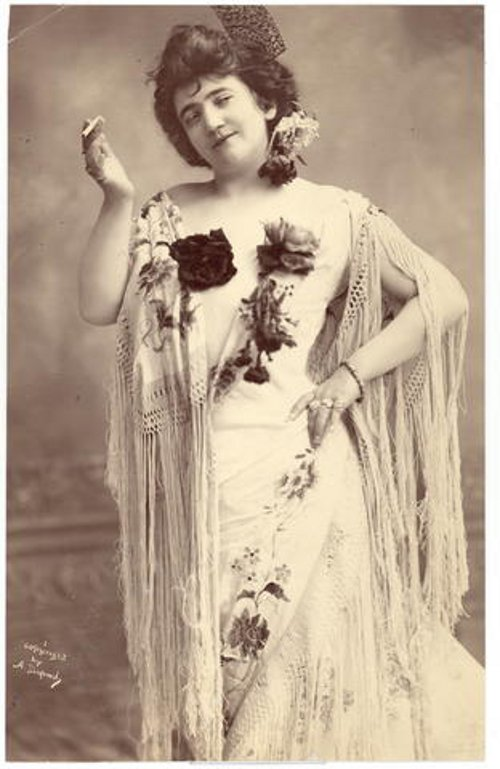
- Emma Calvé as Carmen
- Born: Rosa Emma Calvet; 15 August 1858; Decazeville, Aveyron, France
- Died: 6 January 1942 (aged 83); Montpellier, Hérault, France
- Occupation: Operatic dramatic soprano
- Spouse: Galileo Gasparini (m. 1911; div. 1921)

Signature
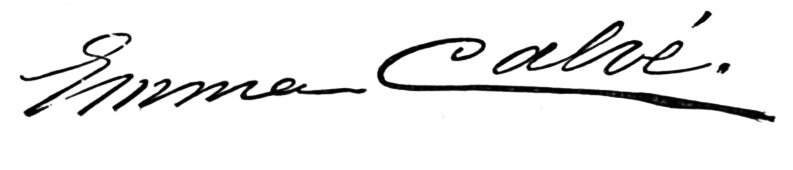

Emma Calvé, born Rosa Emma Calvet (15 August 1858 – 6 January 1942) was a French operatic dramatic soprano.

Calvé was probably the most famous French female opera singer of the Belle Époque. Hers was an international career, and she sang regularly at the Metropolitan Opera House, New York, and the Royal Opera House, London.

== Early life ==
Calvé was born on 15 August 1858 in Decazeville, Aveyron. Her birth name was Rosa Emma Calvet. Her father, Justin Calvet, was a civil engineer. She spent her childhood at first in Spain with her parents, then in different convent schools in Roquefort and Tournemire (Aveyron). After her parents separated, she moved with her mother to Paris. There she attempted to enter the Paris Conservatory, while she studied singing under Jules Puget.

She started learning music in Paris from Mathilde Marchesi, a retired German mezzo-soprano and Manuel García. She made a tour of Italy, where she saw the famous actress Eleonora Duse, whose impersonations made a deep impression on the young singer. She trained herself in stage craft and gesture by closely observing Duse's performances.

== Career ==
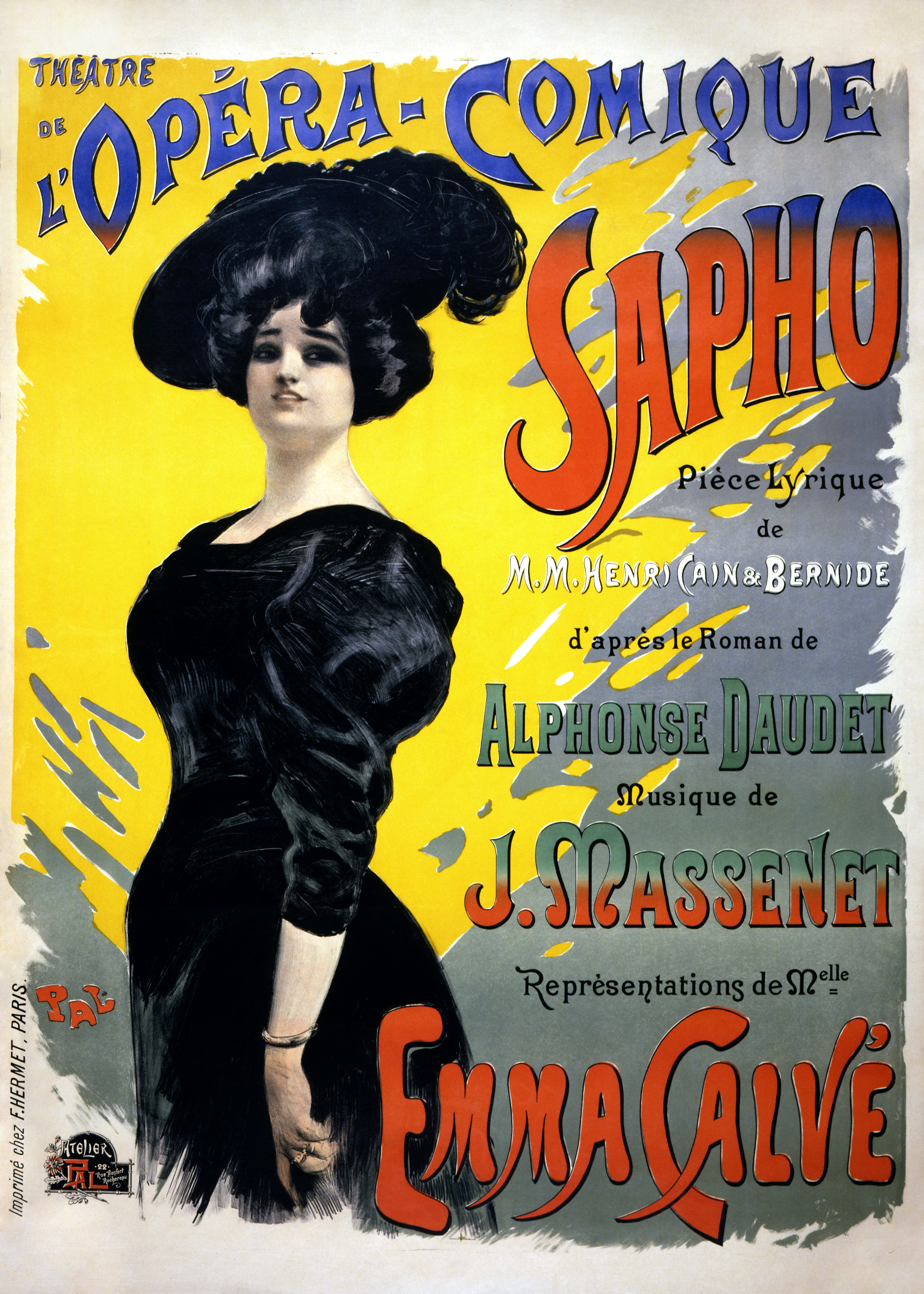
Poster for Emma Calvé in Massenet's Sapho, Opéra-Comique, Paris, 27 November 1897

She made her operatic debut on 23 September 1881 in Gounod's Faust at Brussels' La Monnaie. Later she sang at La Scala in Milan, and also at the principal theatres of Naples, Rome, and Florence.

Returning to Paris in 1891, she created the part of Suzel in L'amico Fritz by Pietro Mascagni, playing and singing the role later at Rome. Because of her great success in it, she was chosen to appear as Santuzza in the French premiere of Cavalleria rusticana, which was viewed as one of her greatest parts. She repeated her success in it in London.

In 1892, she spent six months in Rome, studying under Domenico Mustafà, the last castrato head of the Sistine Chapel Choir, adding half an octave to the top of her range.

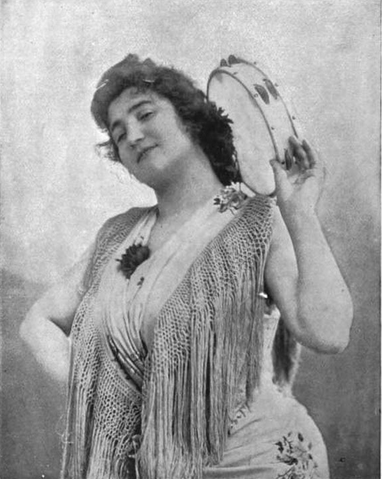
Emma Calvé (1895)

Her next triumph was Bizet's Carmen. Before beginning the study of this part, she went to Spain, learned the Spanish dances, mingled with the people and patterned her characterization after the cigarette girls whom she watched at their work and at play. In 1894, she made her appearance in the role at the Opéra-Comique, Paris. The city's opera-goers immediately hailed her as the greatest Carmen that had ever appeared, a verdict other cities would later echo. She had had many famous predecessors in the role, including Adelina Patti, Minnie Hauk and Célestine Galli-Marié, but critics and musicians agreed that in Calvé they had found their ideal of Bizet's cigarette girl of Seville.

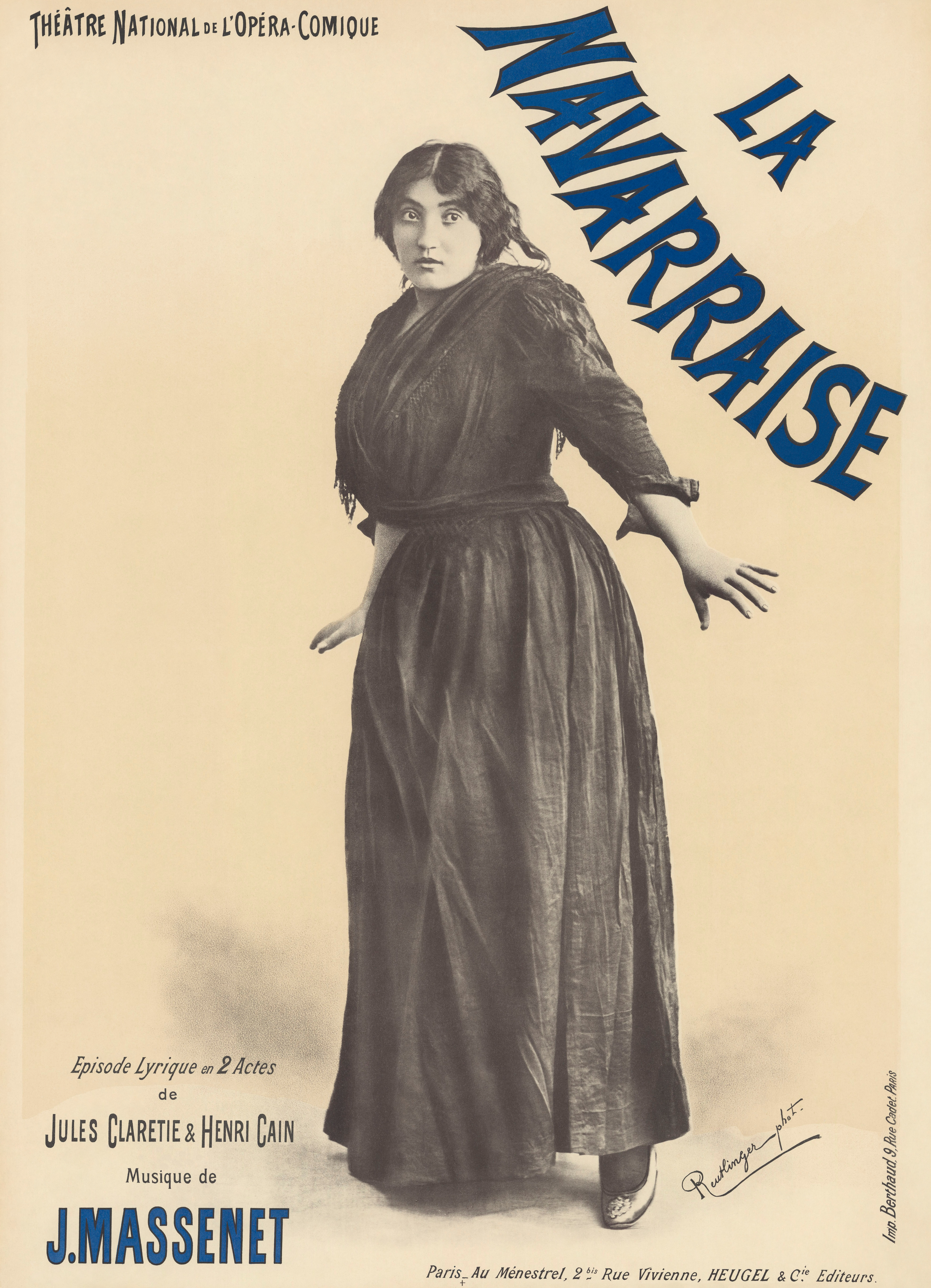
Poster of Calvé in La Navarraise

Calvé first appeared in America in the season of 1893–1894 as Mignon. She would make regular visits to the country, both in grand opera and in concert tours. After making her Metropolitan Opera debut as Santuzza, she went on to appear a total of 261 times with the company between 1893 and 1904. She created the part of Anita, which was written for her, in Massenet's La Navarraise in London in 1894 and, in 1897, sang Sapho in an opera written by the same composer.

One of her most critically acclaimed roles was Ophélie in Ambroise Thomas's Hamlet. She achieved particular success with it at the Metropolitan Opera in 1895, where one critic even claimed that she was among the greatest Ophélies heard in New York since the days of Christina Nilsson, the role's creator. She appeared with success in many roles, among them, as the Countess in The Marriage of Figaro, the title role in Félicien David's Lalla-Roukh, as Pamina in The Magic Flute, and as Camille in Hérold's Zampa, but she is overall best remembered for her portrayal of Carmen.

Calvé's Metropolitan Opera career ended abruptly in 1904 after an incident during a Sunday night concert with Felix Mottl conducting. An excerpt of a review of the performance detailing the events that occurred stated:

Mme. Calve sang at the farewell concert in the Metropolitan in New York last Sunday night, and Mr. Mottl conducted. The aria the songstress was to give—an excerpt from Berlioz's Damnation of Faust—was accompanied as skillfully as her capricious tempi and Mr. Mottl's agility made possible. An encore was demanded, and the singer came forward and Mr. Mottl went to the piano. He began. So did she. The middle of the song was reached, when she suddenly stopped and ordered him to transpose the rest of the number half a tone lower. He did so, although her indulging in her favorite pastime of commenting audibly on his stupidity did not appear to please him particularly. And when the piece was finished the scene indulged in behind the scenes was of such intensity that Mme. Calve refused to sing her second number. Mr. Mottl went ahead with his part of the program, and when the announcement was made that the soprano would not give her other selection, the public applauded heartily.

After this incident, Calvé left the Metropolitan Opera permanently and would only return to New York to perform at Hammerstein's Manhattan Opera House in 1907.

Calvé gave a farewell concert in March 1909 with conductor Victor Harris and his orchestra at the William A. Salomon mansion in Manhattan. It was given as benefit concert for the New York Throat, Nose, and Lung Hospital. Later that year a new annex to the hospital containing 50 hospital beds was opened. It was named the Emma Calvé Ward.

Calvé developed an interest in the paranormal and was once engaged to the occult author Jules Bois.

In the winter of 1893/1894 the Swiss-born American artist Adolfo Müller-Ury (1862–1947) executed a life-size portrait of her standing full-length in a green-blue dress, wearing an opera cloak of white and gold with a sable edge, clutching American Beauty roses. It is now lost, but a pastel he made of her in March 1894 has been discovered in a London private collection.

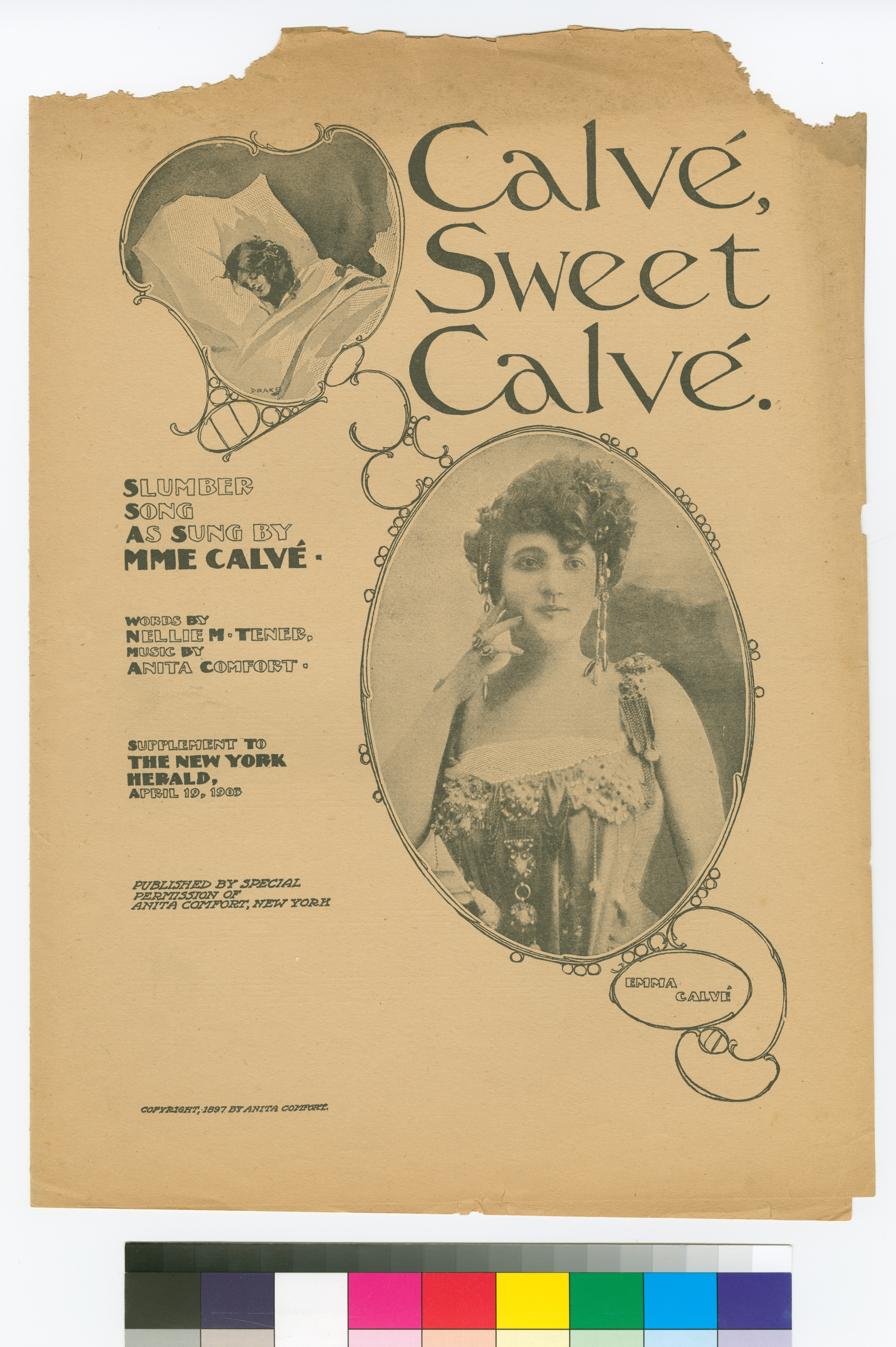
Slumber song as sung by Mme Calvé. Published as a supplement to the New York Herald, 19 April 1903. Cover includes photograph of Emma Calvé.

== Later life ==
Calvé died on 6 January 1942 at Montpellier, Hérault, and is buried in Millau. Her voice is preserved in a number of recordings made between 1902 and 1920. These are available on CD transfers.

== Influences ==
While performing at Chicago in 1894, Calvé's only daughter died in a fire accident. This tragic incident had a serious mental toll on her, as she contemplated suicide. It was in this period of intense grief that she met Swami Vivekananda, who prevented her from committing suicide and restored her back to her former cheerful form. Calvé had accompanied Vivekananda along with Miss Josephine MacLeod, Sir Francis Jules Bois and his wife and Sarah Bernhard while they travelled through Europe and Egypt from 1899 to 1901.

Calvé wrote of Swami Vivekananda in her autobiography: "[He] truly walked with God, a noble being, a saint, a philosopher and a true friend. His influence upon my spiritual life was profound ... my soul will bear him eternal gratitude".

She also visited Belur Math, Swami Vivekananda's tribute to his guru Ramakrishna Paramahansa. She said of this visit and her association with the monks there: "The hours that I spent with these gentle philosophers have remained in my memory as a time apart. These beings – pure, beautiful and remote seemed to belong to another universe, a better and wiser world"

Swami Vivekananda wrote of Calvé:

She was born poor but by her innate talents, prodigious labour and diligence, and after wrestling against much hardship, she is now enormously rich and commands respect from kings and emperors. ... The rare combination of beauty, youth, talents, and "divine" voice has assigned Calve the highest place among the singers of the West. There is, indeed, no better teacher than misery and poverty. That constant fight against the dire poverty, misery, and hardship of the days of her girlhood, which has led to her present triumph over them, has brought into her life a unique sympathy and a depth of thought with a wide outlook.

== Works ==
- Calvé, Emma: My Life, trans. Rosamond Gilder (New York, London: D. Appleton & Co, 1922).
- Calvé, Emma: Sous Tous Les Ciels J’ai Chanté. . . (Paris: Librarie Plon, 1940) (I have sung under every sky—autobiography).

== Chronological table ==
- 1858 Birth of Rosa Emma Calvet in Decazeville.
- 1864 She attends a convent in Rodez. The sisters give some concerts where Mgr Bourret, bishop of this town appreciates her voice.
- 1874 Emma and her mother Léonie go up to Paris. Although they are short of money, Puget consents to give Emma lessons.
- 1882 Debut at the Brussels La Monnaie, as Marguerite in Charles Gounod's Faust. Lessons by Mrs Marchesi, one of the most influential voice teachers of the era.
- 1882 end, Théodore Dubois' Aben Hamet in the Théâtre-Italien. 1883 She creates Victorin Joncières' Le Chevalier Jean in the Opéra-Comique. She sings in Zampa and Lalla-Roukh. After a failure at the Scala, recommended by Gounod, she took lessons from Rosine Laborde. In Rome she took lessons from Domenico Mustafà (1829–1912).
- 1885 November, in Nice she sings the part of Leïla in Bizet's Les pêcheurs de perles with a grand success. She sings Halévy's L'éclair.
- 1890 May, Milan. Triumph in the Scala with Hamlet.
- 1890 She creates Cavalleria rusticana in Florence. She sings in Rome, then in Naples.
- 1891 November: French premiere of Cavalleria rusticana at the Opéra-Comique in Paris.
- 1892 Travel in Spain; November: great success in Carmen at the Opéra-Comique.
- 1893 Carmen in London's Covent Garden, and in Windsor by Queen Victoria. September: she leaves for the United States. Carmen in the Metropolitan Opera in New York, then in Boston, Chicago and Montreal.
- 1894 July: she buys the medieval castle of Cabrières.
- 1895 October: she creates Massenet's La Navarraise in Paris; Tour in Russia: Saint Petersburg, performance in front of the tsar.
- 1896 November: creation of Massenet's Sapho, with a libretto from a novel by Alphonse Daudet.
- 1899–1900 Travel in Orient along with Swami Vivekananda
- 1902 She creates in the Opéra-Comique Reynaldo Hahn's La Carmélite.
- 1903 April: Hector Berlioz's La Damnation de Faust.
- 1904 October: in the Gaîté, Massenet's Hérodiade.
- 1906 Germany and Austria
- 1910–1912 Travel around the world
- 1914 July: Berlin December: 4th tour in the United States
- 1915 USA
- 1916 Benefit concerts in Montpellier, Marseille, Toulon, Nice and Cannes, for the Red Cross.
- 1919 For the last time in the Opéra-Comique. English tour with tenor Vladimir Rosing and pianist Arthur Rubinstein.
- 1920 She records for Pathé Records.
- 1922 Tour in England, Scotland and Ireland, with Alfred Cortot and Jacques Thibaud.
- 1925 5th tour in the USA.
- 1925 She retired from the stage. She returned in her beloved Midi to teach, living in different houses in Millau and surroundings.
- 1942 6 January – dies in a clinic in Montpellier, aged 83.

== Discography ==
- in Les Introuvables du Chant Français EMI, 2005;
- Emma Calve: the Complete Victor Recordings (1907–16), Romophone CD 81024–2.
