= Massimo Palombella =

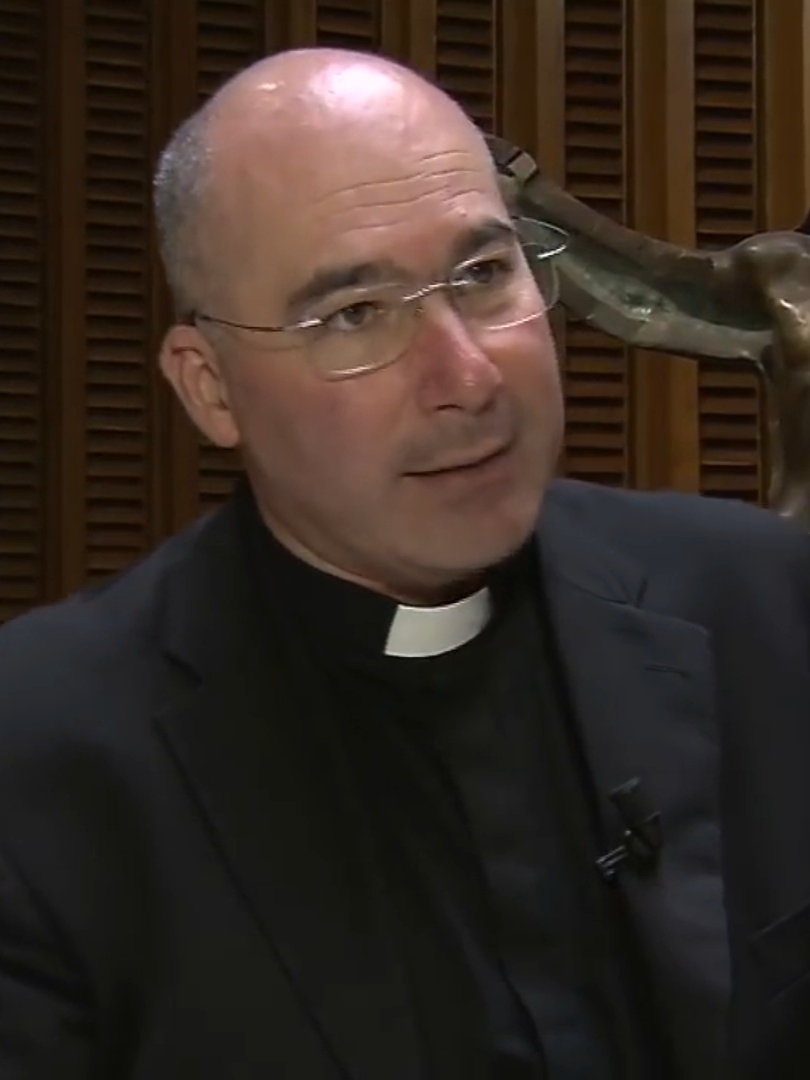

Massimo Palombella (Turin, 25 December 1967) is an Italian Salesian priest and he was director of the Cappella Musicale Pontificia Sistina, succeeding Giuseppe Liberto, and before him Domenico Bartolucci and Lorenzo Perosi and preceding Marcos Pavan. Having run the choir for eight years, in late 2024 he was ordered to pay back €127,000 of embezzled funds he stole from the choir’s global tours. He was also sentenced for this crime to three years in prison.
