= Pier Francesco Tosi =

Italian castrato singer, composer and writer

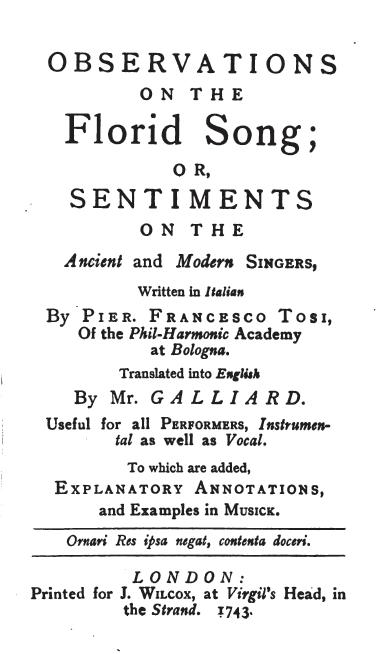
Title plate from the English Translation of Tosi's singing treatise, Observations on the Florid Song, first published in England in 1743.

Pier Francesco Tosi (c. 1653 – 1732) was a castrato singer, composer, and writer on music. His Opinoni de' cantori antichi e moderni... was the first full-length treatise on singing and provides a unique glimpse into the technical and social aspects of Baroque vocal music.

== Life and career ==
Tosi was born in Cesena, Papal States in 1653 or 1654. There is a disagreement among sources whether he was the son of composer Giuseppe Felice Tosi. He was castrated before puberty to preserve his high voice. While it is not known where he received his rudimentary music training, he sang at a church in Rome from 1676 to 1677 and at the Milan Cathedral from 1681 until 1685, when he was dismissed for “misconduct.” Thereafter, he made his one recorded appearance in opera at Reggio nell’Emilia in 1687 (in Varischino’s Odoacre) and was based for a time in Genoa. In 1693 Tosi relocated to London where he took on singing students and sang in weekly public concerts. In 1701 he entered into the service of Austrian Emperor Joseph I and Johann Wilhelm, Elector Palatine, whom he served as a musical and diplomatic agent, traveling extensively until 1723. In 1724 he returned to a London ablaze with the works of Handel, where he again taught and was a founding member of the Academy of Ancient Music. He took holy orders sometime before his death in Faenza, Italy in 1732. In addition to being a well-known soprano (of the cantabile style, singing mostly chamber music) and voice teacher, Tosi was a composer of oratorio Il Martirio di Santa Caterina (1701), several arias and cantatas.

== Opinioni de' cantori antichi, e moderni... [Observations on the Florid Song] ==
Opinioni is primarily directed to the singing teacher, laying out what and how they must teach their pupils. It also includes a chapter and several passages addressed to the future professional singer with advice on good taste, ornaments, performance skills and the life and business of singing professionally. Tosi stresses the need for a long period of student training in reading and composing music, singing and constructing ornamentation, as well as in grammar, diction, social decorum and acting. All the standard ornaments of the time are thoroughly presented: appoggiatura, messa di voce, eight kinds of trills, passaggi (divisions), and portamento. Tosi also dedicates a chapter each to recitative and aria singing, preaching throughout the necessity of improvising one's own graces and divisions on the spot in performances.

There are a few teachings of Tosi's in his Opinioni that have been particularly interesting to singers and scholars over the years. Tosi clearly advocates uniting and blending the chest and head registers, the first recorded vocal pedagogue to do so. While earlier writers such as Zacconi and Caccini stated that singers ought to only sing in their “natural voice,” Tosi went so far as to say “[I]f [the chest and head register] do not perfectly unite, the Voice will be of divers Registers, and must consequently lose its Beauty.” Tosi's is also the first recorded encouragement of the use of rubato as an embellishment. While he again and again rails on singers who accidentally sing out of tempo or self-aggrandizingly hold out notes as in the modern fermata, he encourages “[t]he stealing of Time […], provided he makes a Restitution with Ingenuity”; meaning, provided the singer catches back up the accompaniment, allowing them to keep tempo.

Another interesting element of Opinioni is Tosi's discussions on intonation and sol-fa-ing. During a period in which various methods of temperament were used by keyboards, strings and even singers, Tosi laments that “except in some few Professors, that modern Intonation is very bad.” He speaks of a differing “Semitone Major and Minor” (or a larger and a smaller semitone) whose “[d]ifference cannot be known by an Organ or Harpsichord, if the Keys of the Instrument are not split.” Consequentially, he warns that “if a Soprano was to sing D sharp, like E flat, a nice Ear will find he is out of Tune, because this last rises.” Tosi's remedy to poor intonation is to begin the singer young on solfege, using the traditional gamut created by Guido. While both the Guidonian hexachord system and meantone temperament were becoming antiquated at the time Tosi wrote his treatise, he nevertheless insisted on their use.

Opinioni was in fact a watershed for much more than just early Baroque music theory and tuning. Tosi spends a considerable amount of time in his treatise praising the “ancient” cantabile (or “Pathetick,” as the original translator put it) style of his generation, around the start of the 18th century. He cannot seem to understand why “the Mode” has moved to the rapid, highly ornate “Allegro” style popular at the time of his writing, which he lumps with insufficient singer training, ignoring the traditional Church modes and “tasteless” virtuosic displays as the great sin of the “modern” music generation. Being a pragmaticist, however, he still encourages “it will be of Use to a prudent Scholar, who is desirous to be expert in both Manners.”

== Literature ==
- Dutch Translation: "Korte Aanmerkingen over de Zangkonst, getrokken uit een Italiaansch Boek, betyteld Osservazioni sopra il canto figurato di Pier-Francesco Tosi" (Leyden, 1731)
- Opinioni de’ cantori antichi, e moderni o sieno osservazioni sopra il canto figurato. (Bologna 1723).
- English Translation: Observations on the Florid Song. Trans. by John Ernest Galliard, London: J. Wilcox, 1742 or 1743.
- German Translation and Extensive Commentary: Anleitung zur Gesangskunst. By Johann Friedrich Agricola. Berlin: George Ludewig Winter, 1757. Facsimile Edition with introduction and commentary by Kurt Wichmann. Leipzig: VEB Deutscher Verlag für Musik, 1966.
- Tosi, Pierfrancesco: Opinions of singers, Ancient and Modern, or Observations on Figured Singing, English translation with introduction and commentary by Edward Foreman Minneapolis, Pro Music Press, 1993
- Portuguese translation: Opiniões de cantores antigos e modernos, ou seja, Observações sobre o canto florido. Introduction and commentary by Alberto José Vieira Pacheco and Edoardo Sbaffi. Rio de Janeiro: Ed. UFRJ, 2022. ISBN 978-65-88388-20-4

== Sources ==
- Malcolm Boyd/John Rosselli. The New Grove Dictionary of Opera, edited by Stanley Sadie (1992). ISBN 0-333-73432-7 and ISBN 1-56159-228-5
- Text for this article has been excerpted by permission of the author from the introduction to P.F. Tosi Observations on the Florid Song, Bel Canto Masters Study Series (Pitch Perfect Publishing, 2009). ISBN 978-0-557-12293-6.
