= Animuccia =

Animuccia is an Italian surname. Notable people with the surname include:

- Giovanni Animuccia (1520–1571), Italian composer
- Paolo Animuccia (died 1569), Italian composer, brother of Giovanni
