= Giuseppe Santarelli =

Italian opera singer and composer

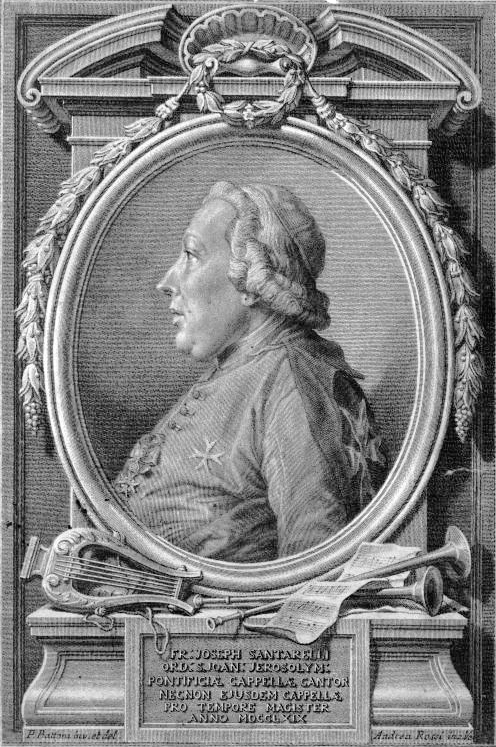
Giuseppe Santarelli

Giuseppe Santarelli (1710–1790) was an Italian castrato, composer, choir conductor, voice teacher, and Roman Catholic priest. He was named a knight of the Sovereign Military Order of Malta.

== Life and career ==
Born in Forlì, he entered a monastery in the Order of Saint Augustine at a young age where he was eventually ordained. The exact details of his musical training are unknown, although it is clear he must have been thoroughly trained in music composition, music theory, and in singing. He was active on the opera stage in Venice during the 1740s. In 1749 he became a singer in the Sistine Chapel Choir in Vatican City, ultimately being appointed conductor in 1770. He was also for many years the cantor at the Basilica di Santa Maria Maggiore. In 1761 he published an essay on the organisation of the Sistine Chapel Choir, under the title: Informazione del Cantor Fra' Giuseppe Santarelli Cappellano d'onore dell'Eminentissimo e Reverendissimo Signor Cardinale Alessandro Albani come Ministro Plenipotenziario delle Loro MM. Imp. e Reali presso la S. Sede. In risposta ad un Biglietto di esso Eminentissimo (Roma, Komarek). As a teacher of singing his notable pupils included Muzio Clementi and Venanzio Rauzzini. His compositions consist entirely of choral works.

In 1770 Santarelli met the English music historian Charles Burney who was touring France and Italy in 1770–1771. Burney was highly impressed by Santarelli's musical abilities, and the two men became friends. Santarelli used his influence to get Burney access to the Papal Music Archive, which proved invaluable for Burney's books The Present State of Music in France and Italy (1771) and History of Music (1776).

He died in Rome.

== Works ==
- Alessandro nell'Indie (1754)
- Della musica del santuario, e della disciplina de' suoi cantori, 1756
