= Sistine Chapel Choir =

Personal choir of the Pope

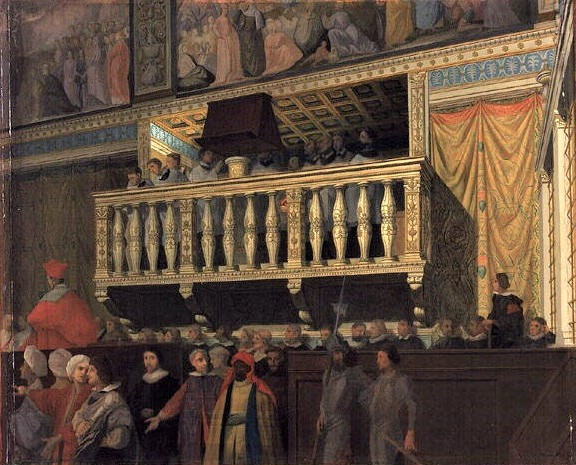
The choirloft of the Sistine Chapel in the early 17th century, depicted by Agostino Tassi (here in a 1848 copy by Ingres).

The Sistine Chapel Choir, as it is generally called in English, or officially the Coro della Cappella Musicale Pontificia Sistina in Italian, is the Pope's personal choir. It performs at papal functions in the Sistine Chapel and in any other church in Rome where the Pope is officiating, including St. Peter's Basilica. One of the oldest choirs in the world, it was constituted as the Pope's personal choir by Pope Sixtus IV (from whom both the choir and the chapel in which it performs take their names). Although it was established in the late 15th century, its roots go back to the 4th century and the reign of Pope Sylvester I.

The choir's composition and numbers have fluctuated over the centuries. However, the modern choir comprises twenty men (tenors and basses) and thirty boys (sopranos and altos). The men's choir (Cantori) is composed of professional singers. The members of the boys' choir (Pueri Cantores) are not paid when performing at papal functions, but receive a free education at their own school in Rome, known as the Schola Puerorum. Since the late 20th century, in addition to its papal duties, the choir has undertaken international tours, participated in radio and television broadcasts, and recorded for Deutsche Grammophon.

== History ==
=== Precursors ===
Papal patronage of music, and especially singing, dates to the 4th century when, according to 9th-century written accounts, Pope Sylvester I constituted a company of singers, under the name of schola cantorum. The schola was reorganized by Pope Gregory I during his reign (590–604). The purpose of the Gregorian schola was to teach both singing techniques and the existing plainsong repertory, which at the time was passed down by oral tradition. Under Pope Gregory, the course of study was said to be nine years. When Innocent IV fled to Lyon in the 13th century, he provided for the schola's continuance in Rome by turning property over to it. When Pope Clement V moved the papacy from Rome to Avignon in 1309, he formed his own choir in Avignon. Gregory XI brought the papal court back to Rome in 1377, bringing with him his choir, which consisted largely of French singers and amalgamated it with what was left of the old schola cantorum.

=== Establishment and early history ===
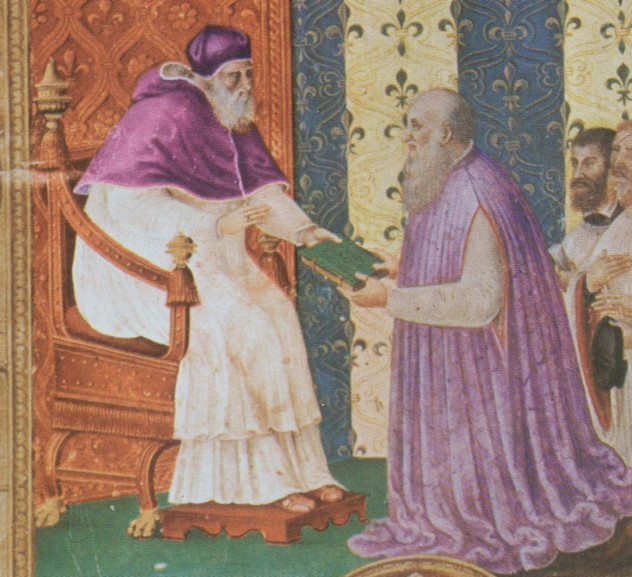
Ludovico Magnasco receiving the new constitution for the choir from Pope Paul III in 1545

Pope Sixtus IV, who reigned from 1471 to 1484, established the Cappella Musicale Pontificia as his permanent personal choir. It sang in the chapel of the Apostolic Palace, which Sixtus had renovated to become his private chapel, originally called the Cappella Magna and later known as the Sistine Chapel. The choir was and remains all-male and sang without musical accompaniment (a cappella). It initially consisted of between 16 and 24 singers, with the men singing the bass, tenor, and alto parts and pre-adolescent boys singing the soprano parts, although from the mid-16th century, adult castrato singers began to replace the boy singers. The choir was to become the most important centre of Roman music. Josquin des Prez, one of the greatest composers of the Renaissance, served as its composer and directed the choir from 1486 to 1494.

In April 1545, the members of the choir sent a delegation to the choir's maestro di cappella at the time, Ludovico Magnasco, petitioning for a new constitution. It was argued that a new constitution was needed because all previous copies had been destroyed in the 1527 sack of Rome. Written largely "from memory" with a few additions, it was completed on 17 November 1545. Five years later, the singers rebelled against Magnasco and appealed to Pope Julius III. They accused him of appointing singers without papal permission and without an audition. The most egregious of such appointments was Ottavio Gemelli, who was later suspended for thievery. They also complained that Magnasco held back the salaries of several singers without justification and prohibited others from even entering the Sistine Chapel. In November 1550, Julius III ousted Magnansco as maestro di cappella and replaced him with Girolamo Maccabei.

Julius III was also keen to reduce the size of the choir, which had been bloated by the patronage system and contained many members who were singers in name only. In an undated motu proprio c.1553, he decreed that no new singers would be taken on until the choir was reduced by attrition to 24 members, after which new members were required to pass a strict audition. However, Julius III defied his own reforms when, in January 1555, he appointed his favourite composer, Giovanni Pierluigi da Palestrina, to the choir without an audition. Palestrina's time in the choir, which he also conducted, was cut short when the austere Paul IV ascended to the papacy. In a motu proprio promulgated on 30 July 1555, he decreed that married men could no longer be members of the choir. Palestrina and two other married singers, Domenico Ferrabosco and Leonardo Barré, were dismissed with pensions. Nevertheless, according to musicologist Richard Sherr, Palestrina "more than any other composer was to personify music in the Sistine Chapel."

Like his predecessors and his successor, Magnansco was a high-ranking cleric and not a musician. He had been the Bishop of Castro del Lazio and was the Bishop of Assisi from 1543. The situation changed in 1586 when Pope Sixtus V issued a Papal bull which reorganized the choir's structure and finances. It established the College of Singers as a legal entity, required that the maestro di cappella be a singer elected by his peers, and entrusted the secular welfare of the choir to a "cardinal protector".

=== 18th and 19th centuries ===
During their first trip to Italy, the 14-year-old Mozart and his father Leopold arrived in Rome on 11 April 1770. It was Holy Week, and that evening they attended a performance of Allegri's Miserere in the Sistine Chapel. Allegri, who had been a singer in the Sistine Chapel Choir, had composed the piece in 1638. A complex nine-part choral work, the Allegri Miserere was considered one of the choir's most famous pieces and was performed during the Tenebrae service on the Wednesday and Friday of every Holy Week. The score was closely guarded, and its publication was forbidden by the choir on pain of excommunication, although Emperor Leopold I, King John V of Portugal, and the composer Giovanni Battista Martini were known to have authorized copies. According to multiple biographies of Mozart and based largely on accounts by his father, the young Mozart wrote down the score from memory after hearing it at the 11 April performance. He later declaimed it to one of the choir's singers who recognized it immediately, a feat which caused a sensation at the time.

The Napoleonic Wars in the early 19th century almost led to the disintegration of the choir. The armies of the Papal States were defeated by the French forces who occupied Rome and placed the Pope under house arrest. Travel to Italy, especially for those from the countries at war with Napoleon, became difficult. The number of foreign visitors who once flocked to Rome to hear the choir in the 18th century drastically declined. Following Napoleon's defeat at Waterloo and the renewed interest in Italian history and culture fueled by the writers of the Romantic Era, foreign travellers returned to Rome, and hearing a performance by the choir, especially during Holy Week, was considered an important stop on their tour.

The composer and bass singer, Giuseppe Baini, was admitted to the choir in 1795 and unanimously elected as its director in 1818, a position he held until his death in 1844. In 1828, he published an influential two-volume treatise on the life and works of Palestrina, one of the choir's most famous composers. According to music historian Richard Boursy, the book enhanced not only the reputation of Palestrina but also that of Baini and the choir itself, adding to the mystique it still held in the first half of the 19th century.

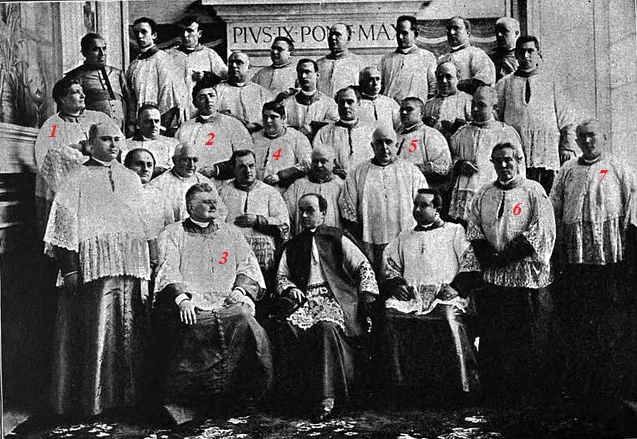
The choir in 1898, which included seven castrato singers: 1 Giovanni Cesari. 2 Domenico Salvatori. 3 Domenico Mustafà. 4 Alessandro Moreschi. 5 Vincenzo Sebastianelli. 6 Gustavo Pesci. 7 Giuseppe Ritarossi.

Following Baini's death, the choir remained without a permanent director ("perpetual director" in the choir's terminology) for over 30 years. The revolutions of 1848 in the Italian states and the establishment of the short-lived Roman Republic ushered in a period of disruption for the choir. It was suspended under the Roman Republic. When the Republic fell, Pope Pius IX returned to Rome, and the choir resumed its activities. However, four of its members had sung in a Te Deum on 9 February 1849 in thanksgiving for the Republican victory—Alessandro Montecchiani, Giovanni Poli, Alessandro Chiari and Domenico Mustafà. In reprisals against those suspected of supporting or sympathizing with the Republicans, Montecchiani was dismissed from the choir, while Chiari, Poli and Mustafà were made to undergo "spiritual exercises" before resuming their activities with the choir. Further disruption came in 1870 when the Capture of Rome permanently ended the Papal States and caused the suspension of the First Vatican Council. The choir finally received a perpetual director in 1878 when Pius IX appointed Mustafà to the post. Mustafà, who had entered the choir in 1845, had been a virtuoso soprano castrato in his prime and was also a composer and skilled conductor.

During the 19th century, the ever-increasing popularity of opera made it difficult for the choir to attract highly skilled singers who could make more money on the operatic stage. As early as 1830, Mendelssohn complained of the quality of the singing. The problem was exacerbated as the supply of castrato singers, the mainstays of the virtuoso soprano parts, began to dry up. With the unification of Italy in 1871, the castration of boy singers was made illegal. In a group photograph of the choir taken in 1898 (see upper-left), there were six castrati choristers left, apart from Mustafa who had retired from singing—Domenico Salvatori (1855–1909), Alessandro Moreschi (1858–1922), Giovanni Cesari (1843–1904), Vincenzo Sebastianelli (1851–1919), Gustavo Pesci (1833–1913), and Giuseppe Ritarossi (1841–1902).

=== 20th century ===
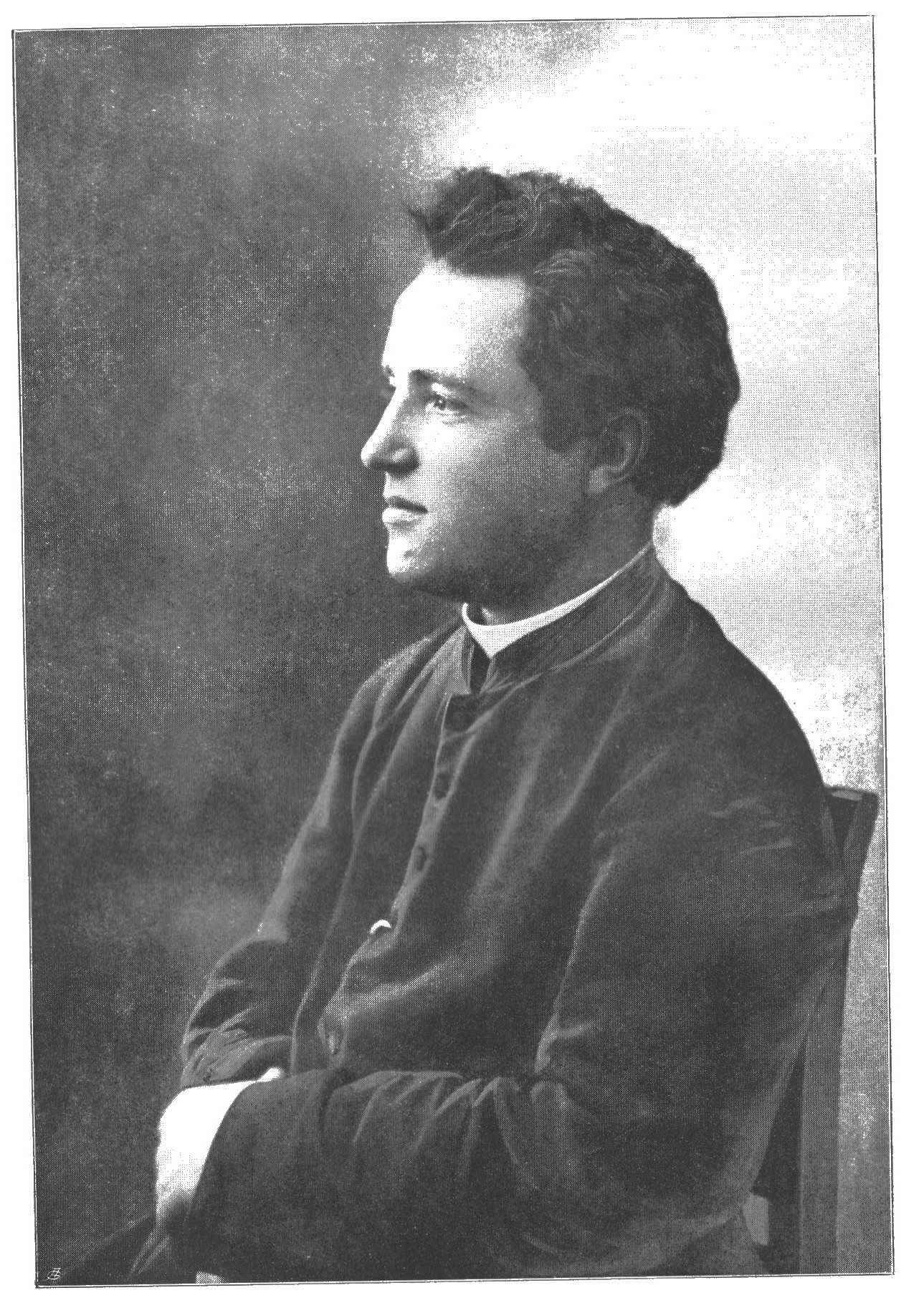
Lorenzo Perosi, the choir's director from 1898 to 1956

Domenico Mustafà's leadership of the choir and the careers of its castrati singers came to a close beginning in 1898 when Lorenzo Perosi was appointed joint perpetual director of the choir. At the time, Perosi was only 26, but already had a considerable reputation as a composer of sacred music. Mustafà had thought that Perosi would carry on the musical traditions of the choir that had guided him. However, Perosi was an adherent of the Cecilian Movement which eschewed the operatic and theatrical style of church music which had been ascendant in the 18th and 19th centuries. He was also strongly against using castrati in the choir and wished to replace them with boy singers. At Perosi's urging, a Papal decree of 3 February 1902 by Pope Leo XIII stipulated that henceforth castrati would no longer be accepted into the choir. Mustafà retired as perpetual director of the choir in January 1903, leaving Perosi the sole director. The remaining castrati gradually died, retired, or were pensioned off. Moreschi, the youngest of the six remaining castrati choristers photographed in 1898, remained on the choir's books until his retirement in 1913.

The accession to the papacy of Perosi's mentor and fellow Cecilianist, Pius X in August 1903 further cemented his position. Under his direction, the last remaining castrati were phased out, and a stable 30-voice boys' choir was added. The choir's music focused once again on Gregorian chant and the polyphonic music of the Renaissance period, especially that of Palestrina. Perosi served as the choir's director until his death in 1956, although his tenure was periodically interrupted by bouts of mental illness.

Perosi was succeeded by Domenico Bartolucci, who had served as his deputy since 1952. Bartolucci reorganised the choir's musical arrangements, adding some of his own works to the repertoire, including his Missa de Angelis, and further increased the emphasis on Palestrina's music, on which he was an authority. He also strengthened the adult choir, created a dedicated rehearsal space for them, and established a school for the choir's boy singers. The choir school, known as the Schola Puerorum, was established in 1963 and is located in a large palazzo on Via del Monte della Farina, which also serves as the administrative and rehearsal base of the Sistine Choir. In addition to training in singing and music, it provides the standard Italian education curriculum for children from the ages of 9 to 13. The boys are not paid for singing at papal functions, but receive their education at the school free of charge.

Bartolucci was deeply opposed to the changes in liturgy and church music brought about by Vatican II (1962–65), which resulted in the introduction of folk and popular music to the liturgy, a trend continued under Pope John Paul II. In 1997, at the instigation of Piero Marini, the master of pontifical ceremonies, Bartolucci was replaced as director of the choir with Giuseppe Liberto. In a 2006 interview with L'Espresso, Bartolucci discussed what he considered the deleterious effect that Vatican II and subsequent developments had had on church music:

The fault lies above all with the pseudo-intellectuals who have engineered this denigration of the liturgy, and thus of music, overthrowing and despising the heritage of the past with the idea of obtaining who knows what advantage for the people.

=== 21st century ===
In 2010, Pope Benedict XVI, who had been Bartolucci's sole supporter on the Curia when he was dismissed in 1997, appointed Massimo Palombella to replace Liberto as the choir's musical director.

Under Bartolucci, the choir had begun participating in radio and television broadcasts as well as regular international tours, including a 17-city tour of the United States in 1986. It was a trend that continued under Palombella. The choir made its first tour of Asia in 2014 and released three studio albums on the Deutsche Grammophon label between 2015 and 2017. June 2012 marked the first time in its history that the Sistine Choir performed jointly in a papal function with another choir from outside the Vatican. The occasion was a Papal Mass celebrated in St Peter's Basilica by Pope Benedict, sung by the Sistine Choir and the Westminster Abbey Choir. The two choirs also sang together at Westminster Abbey in May 2015 and again in 2018. Cecilia Bartoli became the first woman to perform inside the Sistine Chapel in November 2017 when she sang with the Sistine Choir in Pérotin's Beata Viscera. In September of that year, the choir made its first visit to the United States in 30 years, performing at St. Patrick's Cathedral in New York, the Basilica of the National Shrine of the Immaculate Conception in Washington, D.C., and the Detroit Opera House.

More controversial was the choir's performance at the Met Gala in May 2018, where many of the celebrity guests dressed in costumes that, according to The National Catholic Register, were "deemed by many to be a sacrilegious mockery of the Church." The affair also sparked complaints from some of the boys' parents. In June of that year, the choir's planned multi-city tour of the United States was abruptly cancelled. The choir's administrator, Michelangelo Nardella, was suspended in July when the Vatican opened an investigation into alleged money laundering, fraud and embezzlement involving both Nardella and Palombella and related to the choir's foreign tours. In a motu proprio issued by Pope Francis on 19 January 2019, the Sistine Chapel Choir was placed under the administration of the Office of Pontifical Liturgical Celebrations. Mons. Guido Marini, the master of ceremonies for papal liturgies, was tasked with drafting new statutes for the choir. Nardella was replaced by Archbishop Guido Pozzo as the choir's administrator, but for a time Palombella retained his post as the choir's musical director. In July 2019, Palombella resigned as director of the choir. Marcos Pavan, who leads the Pueri Cantores (the boys' section of the choir), was named interim director.

== Past members ==
Past members of the choir include:

- Andrea Adami da Bolsena
- Gregorio Allegri
- Jacques Arcadelt
- Giuseppe Baini
- Odoardo Ceccarelli
- Giovanni Cesari
- Costanzo Festa
- Bruno Filippini
- Antimo Liberati
- Alessandro Moreschi
- Domenico Mustafà
- Marbrianus de Orto
- Giovanni Pierluigi da Palestrina
- Marc'Antonio Pasqualini
- Josquin des Prez
- Domenico Salvatori
- Giuseppe Santarelli
- Gaspar van Weerbeke
- Annibale Zoilo

=== Former boy singers ===
Former boy singers of the choir, most of whom became opera singers as adults, include:

- Nazzareno De Angelis
- Salvatore Baccaloni
- Bruno Beccaria
- Vittorio Grigolo
- Renato Rascel
- Giuseppe Sabbatini
- Pietro Spagnoli

== Recordings ==
- Habemus Papam (2014) – live recordings of the music sung by the Sistine Chapel Choir before, during and after the conclave which elected Pope Francis in 2013: the Mass for the Election of the Roman Pontiff, the entry of the Cardinal-Electors into the Sistine Chapel, Pope Francis's Mass with the Cardinal-Electors, and the Mass in St. Peter's Square for his coronation on 19 March 2013. Label: Deutsche Grammophon
- Cantate Domino (2015) – Gregorian chants and music by Palestrina, Allegri, Orlando di Lasso, Felice Anerio, and Tomas Luis de Victoria. Label: Deutsche Grammophon (the choir's first studio album)
- Palestrina (2016) – motets by Palestrina and his Missa Papae Marcelli. Label: Deutsche Grammophon
- Veni Domine (2017) – Advent and Christmas music by Pérotin, Palestrina, Allegri, Tomas Luis de Victoria, Josquin Desprez, Jean Mouton, and Jacobus Clemens. Label: Deutsche Grammophon
- O Crux Benedicta (2019) – Lent and Holy Week music by Palestrina, Tomas Luis de Victoria, Francesco Soriano, Cipriano de Rore, Orlande de Lassus, Costanzo Festa, Francesco Rosselli, Felice Anerio, and Francisco Gabriel Gálvez

== See also ==
- Cappella Giulia, the choir of St. Peter's Basilica
- Tra le sollecitudini, Pope Pius X's 1903 motu proprio which detailed new regulations for the performance of liturgical music in the Roman Catholic Church
