= Gaetano Capocci =

Italian composer, organist, and maestro

Gaetano Capocci (16 October 1811 – 11 January 1898) was a composer, organist and maestro.

== Life ==
Capocci was born in Rome. As a boy he studied the organ under Sante Pascoli, organist of St. Peter's Basilica, Rome, and he completed his musical studies under Valentino Fioravanti and Francesco Cianciarelli. In 1831 he was granted a diploma as organist by the Accademia Nazionale di Santa Cecilia, and, in 1833, he received a diploma in the art of composition. Almost immediately he was appointed organist of the Basilica di Santa Maria Maggiore, in 1839. In 1855 he was appointed maestro direttore of the Cappella Pia of the Lateran, where he worked for the remainder of his life. Solely devoted to church music, Capocci composed numerous masses and motets. He also wrote two oratorios, Battista and Assalonne. His chief fame rested on his Responsori for Holy Week. At San Salvatore in Lauro he taught castrati Alessandro Moreschi and Giovanni Cesari. His son Filippo Capocci (1840–1911) succeeded him as maestro at the Lateran in 1898.
