= Alberto de Angelis =

Alberto de Angelis (1885–1965) was an Italian historian and musicologist, mostly remembered for writing a biography of composer and choir master Domenico Mustafà. The book, entitled Domenico Mustafa – La Cappella Sistina e la Società Musicale Romana, was published in 1926, and is considered of significant importance for its valuable account of Mustafa's life, the musical society in Rome, and castrati singers at the Capella Sistina.
