= Francisco Gabriel Gálvez =

Spanish composer

- Born: c. 1510
- Died: 1578
- Occupation: Composer
- Era: Renaissance
- Known for: Motet Emendemus in melius

Francisco Gabriel Gálvez (c. 1510 – 1578) was a Spanish Renaissance composer of sacred music and was the maestro di cappella of Cuenca Cathedral from 1560 until his death. His only extant score is a five-part motet, Emendemus in melius.

== Life and works ==
Little is known about Gálvez's early life. The musicologist Miguel Martínez Millán (1911–1985) assumed that he was born in or near the Spanish city of Cuenca where there were several members of a Gálvez family active in the musical life of its cathedral. He served as a musician at the Basilica di Santa Maria Maggiore in Rome before being summoned to Spain in 1560 to serve as the maestro di cappella of Cuenca Cathedral. He remained in that post for the rest of his life, although from September 1863 to March 1564 he absented himself to Aragon in a dispute over his pay. He returned when the cathedral offered him a substantial increase and back pay for the period of his absence. He later received another substantial increase to match an offer for his services from the Cathedral of Segovia.

According to Martínez Millán, Gálvez died shortly after 10 July 1578, and the following September Ginés de Boluda was appointed his successor. Gálvez is buried in the Cuenca Cathedral beside an altar in the nave to the left of the choir. He was the first of the cathedral's maestri di cappella to be buried there. Gálvez had presented the cathedral with a bound collection of his works in 1561 and a book of his hymns and Magnificat settings in 1567. Both are now lost.

The only surviving score by Gálvez is a five-part motet, Emendemus in melius, composed for the first Sunday in Lent and held in the archives of the Sistine Chapel Choir. The choir performs the work on its 2019 recording O Crux Benedicta. A transcription by Jesús María Muneta of the manuscript score was published in Tesoro Sacro Musical (a journal of the Sociedad Española de Musicología) in 1975. According to Giuseppe Baini, the director of the Sistine Chapel Choir from 1818 to 1844, Palestrina took the basic theme of his four-part mass Emendemus in melius (composed in 1594) from Gálvez's earlier work. This analysis was later disputed by the Spanish musicologist Samuel Rubio (1912–1986) who wrote that the two works have too little in common. He also questioned the attribution of the motet to Gálvez. The name of the composer on the manuscript score is written as "Cabreli Cálvez", who according to Rubio, may have been a different person.
