= Cappella Sistina =

Cappella Sistina may refer to:

- The Sistine Chapel in the Vatican Palace
  - The Sistine Chapel Choir, sometimes called the Cappella Musicale Pontificia Sistina
- The Cappella Sistina in the church of Santa Maria Maggiore, Rome
