= Domenico Salvatori =

Italian opera singer

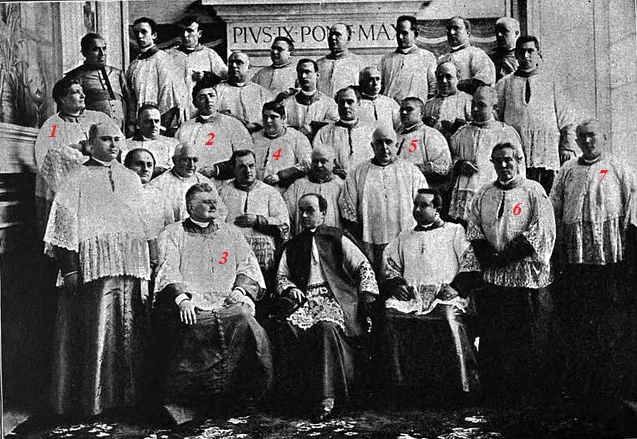
- The Sistine Chapel Choir in 1898; Salvatori is labeled as "2".

Background information
- Born: September 27, 1855; Anagni, Lazio, Papal States
- Died: December 11, 1909 (aged 54); Rome, Kingdom of Italy
- Instrument: Voice

Domenico Salvatori (27 September 1855 – 11 December 1909) along with Alessandro Moreschi, Domenico Mustafà and Giovanni Cesari, was one of the famous castrati singers of the late 19th century.

Born in Anagni, he first started as a contralto at the Cappella Giulia, which he later abandoned in order to enter the Sistine Chapel Choir in 1878 as a now soprano or mezzo. He later became secretary of the choir for some years, holding the position under the direction of Lorenzo Perosi. A good friend of Alessandro Moreschi, the pair often visited their contemporary Domenico Mustafà in his retirement.

Salvatori died in Rome. He is buried in the Monumental Cimitero di Campo Verano in Alessandro Moreschi's tomb.

He, Giovanni Cesari, Vincenzo Sebastianelli, and Alessandro Moreschi made a few phonograph recordings together, but these were only pure choral pieces, and none of them were solo. It is possible to hear him clearly as the contralto voice in a SATB quartet recording of Giovanni Pierluigi da Palestrina's "La cruda mia nemica" (with Moreschi as soprano).
