= Giuseppe Felice Tosi =

Italian composer

- Born: 28 February 1619; Bologna, Italy
- Died: 14 December 1693 (aged 74)
- Occupation(s): Composer and organist
- Relatives: Pier Francesco Tosi (son)

Giuseppe Felice Tosi (28 February 1619 – before 14 December 1693) was an Italian composer and organist, and the father of Pier Francesco Tosi, also a successful composer.

Tosi was born and died at Bologna. He started out as a singer and only started composing in his late fifties. He was among the paid musicians in San Petronio, Bologna, from 1636 to 1641, which possibly means that he received his musical education there. He was a founding member of the Bolognese Accademia Filarmonica in 1666 and was elected its conductor in 1679. His first musical work was the opera Il Celindo which, although composed in 1674, premiered in 1677. He composed a Dixit Dominus for the annual celebration of the academy in San Giovanni in Monte on 4 July 1675. From 1680 to 1683 he was maestro di cappella of the Accademia della Morte, Ferrara, and in 1682–1683 of Ferrara Cathedral as well. In 1686 he served temporarily as maestro di cappella of San Giovanni in Monte, Bologna. From 7 July 1692 until early December 1693 he was second organist at San Petronio. In addition to several operas, Tosi composed sacred music in the typical late 17th-century Bolognese style.

== Sources ==
- Thomas Walker/Marc Vanscheeuwijck. The New Grove Dictionary of Opera, edited by Stanley Sadie (1992). ISBN 0-333-73432-7 and ISBN 1-56159-228-5
