= Paolo Animuccia =

Italian composer

Paolo Animuccia (died 20 October 1569) was a Renaissance Italian composer. He was the brother of Giovanni Animuccia.

It is uncertain whether he was older or younger than his brother Giovanni. Giuseppe Ottavio Pitoni, with inaccuracy, takes upon himself to doubt the relationship altogether; but their contemporary Poccianti distinctly affirms it, speaking of Paolo as, "Animuccia, laudatissimi Joannis frater."

Paolo was made maestro at the Lateran on the removal of Rubino to the Vatican in 1550, and held the post until 1552 when he was succeeded by Lupacchini. Pitoni insists that he remained at the Lateran from 1550 to 1555; but the Libri Censuali are against him. Giuseppe Baini, however, hints that it is possible that he may have occupied the post a second time temporarily in 1555, just before the election of Palestrina, and that this may have misled Pitoni. He died, according to Poccianti, at Borne in 1563.

He has left but little printed music behind him. Two madrigals of his appear in two separate volumes, one in a book of pieces by Orlando Lasso, and the other in a miscellaneous collection of various authors, and both published by Antonio Gardano of Venice in 1559. There is a motet of his in a collection of motets published at Venice in 1568; and Barrè of Milan published some of his motets in a miscellaneous volume in 1588. According to François-Joseph Fétis, the Library of John IV of Portugal contained a collection of Paolo Animuccia's Madrigals in two books entitled Il Desiderio, Madrigali a cinque, Lib. 2.
