= Francisco Soto de Langa =

Spanish singer, editor, and composer

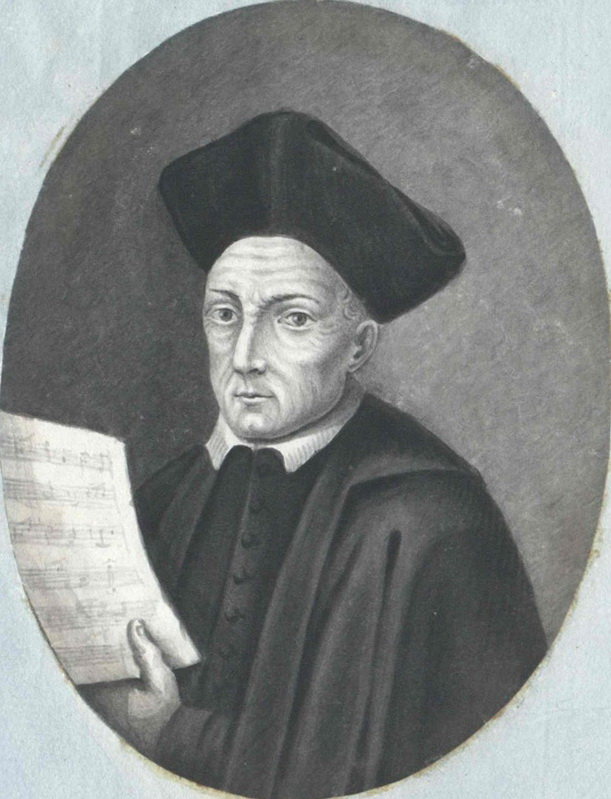
Francisco Soto de Langa

Francisco Soto de Langa (Langa de Duero, Spain, 1534 — Rome, Italy, 1619) was a Spanish singer, editor and composer. A minor exponent of the lauda and priest of the Congregation of the Oratory where he was affiliated with St. Fillippo Neri and Giovanni Animuccia. Soto de Langa was tenured at the papal choir in Rome from 1562 until his retirement in 1611. Reputedly the first castrato to enter into the Papal Chapel, Langa had an instrumental role in the posthumous preservation of Juan Navarro's Psalmi, Hymni ac Magnificat totius Anni. A significant collection of laudi spirituali is extant, of which only a mere handful can be assigned to de Langa with any degree of certainty. Bold vertical harmonies and symmetrically balanced phrases are among his stylistic traits.

== Recordings ==
- Nuove Laudi Ariose della Beatissima Vergine - Tactus, 2001. Progetto Musica, conducted by Giulio Monaco
