= François Roussel =

Italian composer (c.1510–c.1577)

François Roussel (c.1510 – after 1577), also known as Francesco Rosselli (the Italian version of his name), was a French Renaissance composer of both sacred and secular music. His works included motets, masses, madrigals, and songs.

Little is known about Roussel's life in France, apart from his having been a protégé of Guillaume de Gadagne in Lyons sometime before 1568. He was primarily active in Rome. Records show that he was employed as a musician by Cardinal Alessandro Farnese in 1544 and was listed again as a member of his household in 1563. He was the maestro di cappella of the Cappella Giulia, the choir of St. Peter's Basilica, from 1548 until 1550 when he was succeeded by Palestrina. In his first volume of madrigals, Palestrina wrote one in praise of Roussel declaring that he "must surely have been in heaven whence he brought down the divine harmony to mortals."

Roussel later served as the maestro di cappella in three other Roman churches: San Lorenzo in Damaso (1564–1566), San Luigi dei Francesi (1566–1571), and San Giovanni in Laterano (1572–1575).

His motet Adoramus te, Christe performed by the Sistine Chapel Choir appears on the 2019 Deutsche Grammophon recording O Crux Benedicta.
