= Filippo Capocci =

Italian composer (1840–1911)

- Born: 11 May 1840; Rome, Papal States
- Died: 25 July 1911 (aged 71); Rome, Kingdom of Italy
- Occupations: organist and composer

Filippo Capocci (11 May 1840 – 25 July 1911) was an Italian organist and composer.

== Biography ==
Born in Rome, Capocci was trained in organ and harmony by his father Gaetano (1811-1898) and in 1861 received a piano diploma from the Accademia di Santa Cecilia in Rome. In 1875, he was appointed organist of the Archbasilica of St. John Lateran. In 1898, he took over from his father as choirmaster at the Basilica. He also served in the Roman churches of St. Ignatius and St. Mary of Montserrat.

Unlike his father, Filippo Capocci adhered to nineteenth-century musical aesthetics, avoiding the theatrical style, and dedicated himself to a style of performance and composition similar to that of the French organist Alexandre Guilmant.

His opportunity for wider recognition came in 1881 with the inaugural concert for the new Merklin organ at the Church of St. Louis of France. By this time, thanks to his friendship with Guilmant, the world's largest churches opened their doors to Capocci.

Capocci was also one of the three foreign organists who performed in a series of organ concerts using the Cavaille-Coll organ at Trocadero during the 1889 Paris World Fair. In 1890, his performance with Guilmant and Polleri for the inauguration of the new organ of William George Trice at the Basilica of the Immaculate Conception in Genoa marked another point in favor of the Cecilian Movement that resulted from his work as a performer and tester of new organs.

Capocci also endorsed the proposal of the chapter of canons of St. John for the construction of two new organs that were installed after the renovation of the apse built by Pope Leo XIII. This work was commissioned by Nicholas Morettini, one of the first builders in Italy to endorse the principles of the reform. Franz Liszt, while staying in Rome, sought to meet Capocci personally and expressed great esteem and friendship. In 1899, he was accepted as a member of the American Guild of Organists.

He was appointed a member of the organ faculty for the Pontifical Institute of Sacred Music in 1911 but was never able to teach because of an illness that debilitated him for months until his death in Rome in July 1911.

He was the mentor of several noted personalities, including Queen Margherita of Italy and the Brazilian composer and organist Furio Francheschini.

== Works ==
His output for organ consists of about 200 works and includes seven sonatas for organ, twelve volumes of Original Pieces for organ, six volumes for the Divine Office, several volumes of various other compositions, and a Fantasia composed expressly for the inauguration of the organ at St. John Lateran.

As choirmaster, Capocci also devoted himself to vocal composition composing at least three Masses.

His works give an almost neoclassical impression and reflect an orchestral and symphonic taste.

Today, his compositions, which are not well known, are starting to be performed by organists in concerts, a sign of renewed interest in a teacher who, in all respects, might be considered one of the fathers of a new Italian organ school.

== Honours ==
In 1892 Pope Leo XIII awarded him the Knighthood of St. Gregory the Great.
