= Domenico Mustafà =

Italian singer and composer (1829–1912)

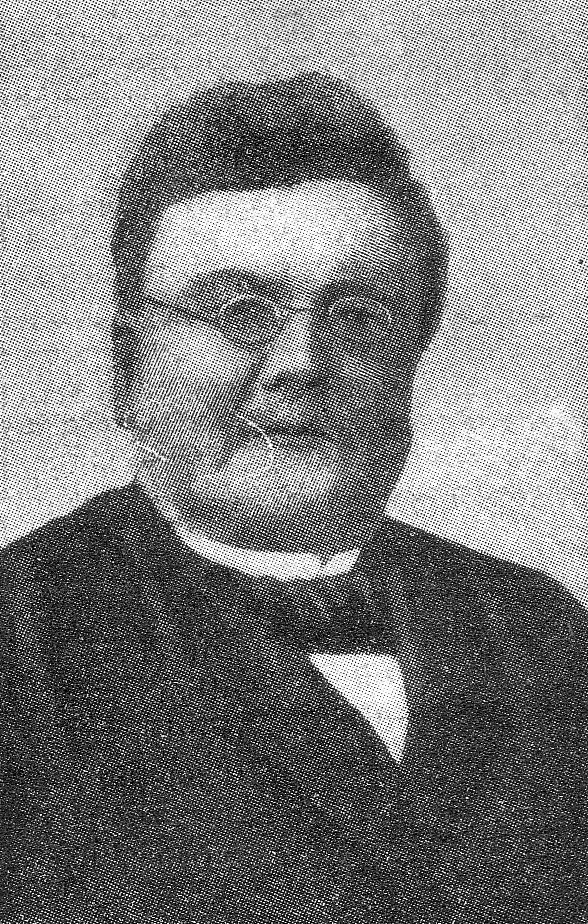
- Born: 16 April 1829; Sellano, Perugia, Papal States
- Died: 17 March 1912 (aged 82); Montefalco, Perugia, Kingdom of Italy
- Occupations: Castrato singer, composer, choir director
- Era: 19th century

Domenico Mustafà (16 April 1829 – 17 March 1912) was an Italian castrato singer, composer and choir director.

== Life ==
Domenico Mustafà was born in the comune of Sellano, province of Perugia, and had been castrated due to a bite from a pig.

He became a famous soprano castrato with the Cappella Sistina in the Vatican. He was admired for his performances of Handelian music. According to Franz Habock, he had a voice "as sweet and pleasant as that of a woman" with a usable range of at least 2 octaves from C4 to C6.

Mustafà was also a composer—among his works were "Miserere" and "Tu es Petrus secundum magnum." Admitted to the Cappella Sistina in Rome as a chorister in 1848, he soon became famous for his singing, intelligence, and gifts as a composer. In 1855 he made his debut as a composer in a "Miserere" for six voices. Five years later, in 1860, he was appointed as choir director by the pope Leo XIII.

He was eventually nominated as a possible candidate, and finally elected, for the post of "Direttore Perpetuo" of the Sistine Chapel in 1878. However, even before 1878, he was already involved in directing the Chapel after the death of its former director Giuseppe Baini. Also, he was an honoured lifetime member and president of the musical organisation "Società Musicale Romana" in Rome.

He came close to returning to the operatic stage when Richard Wagner considered casting him as Klingsor in Parsifal in 1882. However, the whole idea was abandoned shortly afterwards due to a role confusion—the emasculated Klingsor was not a castrato, but a eunuch castrated past puberty and thus singing baritone, not soprano.

Domenico Mustafà was also a teacher and he gave music lessons to the famous French soprano Emma Calvé in 1892. Here he taught Calvé to employ her "fourth voice", which was a very high and refined falsetto extending to a D6. Calvé, after hearing Mustafà perform the trill, described it as: "strange, sexless, superhuman, uncanny."

Being a perpetual director of the Sistine Chapel, he nevertheless decided to withdraw in 1902 on the grounds of high age—appointing Lorenzo Perosi as his successor for the post of director. This was after 54 years of service in the papal chapel. The resignation was accepted in January 1903, when he left Rome. He then retired to a luxurious villa in Montefalco where he spent the rest of his life, where he was occasionally visited by his friends and relatives.

He died in his home in 1912, and was buried in the cemetery of Montefalco, Umbria, where his large tomb stands to this day. Mustafà's role as a director in the Sistine Chapel is considered to be of great importance, and a book about his life was written by Alberto de Angelis and released in 1926. His home villa, "Villa Mustafà", was turned into a hotel, and is now open to visitors and tourists, serving also as a museum in his memory.

== See also ==
- Giovanni Cesari
- Alessandro Moreschi
- Domenico Salvatori

== Sources ==
- De Angelis, Alberto (1926). La Cappella Sistina e la Società Musicale Romana. Bologna: Zanichelli. pp. 188 ff.
