= Ginés de Boluda =

Spanish church musician and composer

Ginés de Boluda (1545 in Hellín – c. 1606) was a Spanish church musician and composer.

He was 'maestro de capilla at the Cathedral of Cádiz by 1578, taking up the same post at Cuenca Cathedral in that year succeeding Francisco Gabriel Gálvez. He applied for the post at the Cathedral of Sigüenza the year after (1579) but instead resigned his position at Cuenca; he then won the post of maestro de capilla at the Cathedral of Toledo, succeeding Andrés Torrentes who died in September 1580, and remained at Toledo for 13 years from early 1581. After his retirement in 1593, he seems to have given up his career as a professional musician; in 160 he refused the position of maestro de capilla to the royal chapel in Granada. He is last recorded in Seville in 1604, and is assumed to have died soon afterwards.

A comparatively minor representative of the Golden Age of Spanish cathedral polyphony, he was nevertheless active in providing music for Toledo himself - all his surviving works date from his time in Toledo - and by procuring for the cathedral a number of important volumes of music, predominantly by Spanish composers. All his extant works are liturgy. Boluda produced at least two In exitu israel settings based on the tonus peregrinus (ninth tone), the popularity of which evidently eclipsed the composer by several generations. Boluda, with Navarro, is a Vespers composer par excellence, his output comprising almost exclusively psalm and Magnificat settings.

== Compositions ==
From the mass book of Toledo, Codex 35, edited by Michael Noone:

- Ginés de Boluda, Missa sobre Ut re mi fa sol la a 5. London: Mapa Mundi

== Recordings ==
- Ginés de Boluda, Jesu corona, Sanctorum meritis, Misa de Feria, et al. Capilla Antigua de Chinchilla, Ars Harmonica.
