= Domenico Bartolucci =

Roman Catholic cardinal (1917–2013)

His Eminence Domenico Bartolucci
- Cardinal-Deacon of Santissimi Nome di Gesù e Maria in Via Lata
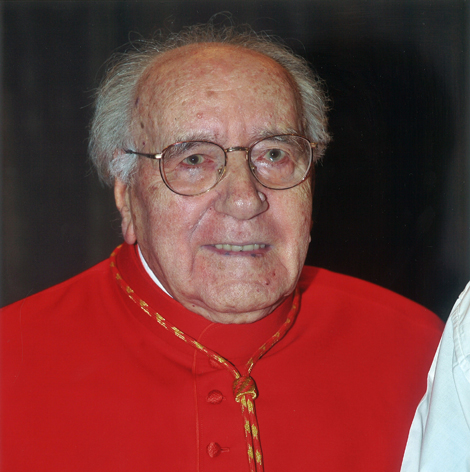
- Other post: Director emeritus of the Sistine Chapel Choir

Orders
- Ordination: 23 December 1939 by Elia Dalla Costa
- Created cardinal: 20 November 2010 by Pope Benedict XVI
- Rank: Cardinal deacon

Personal details
- Born: 7 May 1917 Borgo San Lorenzo, Kingdom of Italy
- Died: 11 November 2013 (aged 96) Rome, Italy
- Denomination: Roman Catholic
- Motto: Psallam Deo meo (I will sing to my God)
- Coat of arms

Domenico Bartolucci (7 May 1917 – 11 November 2013) was an Italian cardinal of the Catholic Church. He was the former director of the Sistine Chapel Choir and the Accademia Nazionale di Santa Cecilia, and was recognised in the field of music both as a director and a prolific composer. Considered among the most authoritative interpreters of Giovanni Pierluigi da Palestrina, Bartolucci led the Sistine Chapel Choir in performances worldwide, and also directed numerous concerts with the Choir of the Academy of Santa Cecilia, including a tour of the former Soviet Union.

On 20 November 2010, Pope Benedict XVI elevated him to the College of Cardinals. Because Bartolucci was over the age of 80, he was never eligible to participate in any papal conclave.

== Biography ==
=== Early career ===
At a very young age, Bartolucci entered the seminary in Florence, where he was recruited as a singer. Upon the death of his master Bagnoli, Bartolucci succeeded him as director of the Chapel of the Duomo of Florence. In those years, he began to compose his first masses, motets, and organ music, as well as madrigals and chamber music.

At the end of 1942, Bartolucci went to Rome in order to deepen his knowledge of sacred music. Having served as Deputy Master of St. John Lateran, in 1947, he was appointed Master of the Liberian Choir of St. Mary Major, succeeding Licinio Refice. In 1952, on the advice of Lorenzo Perosi, he was appointed Deputy Master of the Sistine Chapel.

=== Bartolucci and the Sistine Chapel Choir ===
When Perosi died in 1956, Pope Pius XII gave Bartolucci the position of permanent director of the Pontifical Sistine Chapel Choir. In 1997 Bartolucci was replaced at the helm of the Sistine Chapel by Msgr. Giuseppe Liberto, an event which aroused some controversy in the context of liturgical music. Among those most against the decision, motivated by Papal Master of Ceremonies Archbishop Piero Marini, was Cardinal Joseph Ratzinger, who, after he became Pope Benedict XVI, recalled Bartolucci to direct a concert in the Sistine Chapel on 24 June 2006, in which he offered music from the repertoire of sacred polyphony of Giovanni Pierluigi da Palestrina alongside his own compositions including the motet Oremus pro Pontifice Nostro Benedicto ("Let us pray for our Pontiff Benedict"), dedicated to the Pope.

The ensemble of the Pontifical Sistine Chapel Choir upon the death of Perosi was in poor condition. The situation was restored, however, thanks to the commitment of Bartolucci and the personal interest of Pope John XXIII. In the forty years of Bartolucci's leadership, the choir balanced the obligation of papal liturgies with tours in various countries throughout the world, including Austria, France, Belgium, the Philippines, Australia, the United States, Turkey, Poland and Japan. In the years of the Second Vatican Council Bartolucci, against abandoning Latin, committed himself that the liturgical reform should not take a direction hostile to sacred music.

=== Activity as a composer ===
Bartolucci was also dedicated to teaching and composition. He was a child prodigy, having composed his first Mass at age 12; his best-known Mass is the "Misa Jubilei," written in the Holy Year 1950. The body of his work already published fills more than forty volumes and includes Masses, motets, madrigals, hymns, symphonic, organ, and chamber music, and above all a series of oratorios for soloists, chorus, and orchestra. His three-act opera Brunelleschi is yet to be performed.

The concept of music for Bartolucci is based on naturalness and spontaneity. His reference points are Gregorian chant, Palestrina, and Verdi. Characteristic of Bartolucci's aesthetic conception is a respect for tradition, whose base lies in "a considerable severity of song and a certain limpid and solid polyphony", as he describes in the preface to his First Book of Motets.

=== Creation as cardinal ===
Styles of Domenico Bartolucci
- Reference style: His Eminence
- Spoken style: Your Eminence
- Informal style: Cardinal
- See: none

On 20 October 2010, Pope Benedict XVI announced Monsignor Bartolucci's appointment to the College of Cardinals in the consistory scheduled for 20 November, recognising him for his service to the Church in the area of sacred ecclesiastical Catholic Church music (music used in the Catholic Church's principal liturgical celebrations, especially the Eucharist – the Mass, liturgical processions, rites such as marriages and funerals, and Eucharistic Adoration and Benediction). He was created Cardinal-Deacon of Santissimi Nomi di Gesù e Maria in Via Lata, usually referred to as Gesù e Maria. At his elevation, Bartolucci became the fourth-oldest member of the college. Because he was over the age of 80, under the terms of Pope Paul VI's 1970 motu proprio Ingravescentem aetatem, he was never eligible to vote in any future Papal conclave. Bartolucci was excused from the requirement that a cardinal be or become a bishop.

=== Death ===
Bartolucci died on 11 November 2013, at the age of 96. His funeral Mass took place at St. Peter's Basilica on 13 November, and was led by Angelo Sodano, Dean of the College of Cardinals, with Pope Francis performing the final commendation. The Pope described Bartolucci as a "dear and esteemed priest, illustrious composer, and musician, who exercised his long ministry particularly through sacred music, which is born of faith and expresses faith".

== Honour ==
- Italy: Knight Grand Cross of the Order of Merit of the Italian Republic (1 August 1994)
