= Giovanni Cesari =

Italian opera singer (1843–1904)

Giovanni Cesari (25 June 1843 – 10 March 1904) was an Italian singer with a soprano acuto, or high soprano voice.

Together with Alessandro Moreschi, Domenico Salvatori and Domenico Mustafà, Cesari was a famous castrato singer of the late 19th century. Born in the town of Frosinone, he was dropped off at an orphanage in 1852 by his parents. Here he started his musical education under the direction of Gaetano Capocci, financed by the Sistine Chapel. He was then admitted, upon completing his studies, as a soprano to the Sistine Chapel Choir at the age of 17 in 1861.

In addition to being a soprano at the Sistine Chapel Choir, he was also director of sacred music at several churches of Rome (Santa Lucia al Gonfalone, Santo Spirito in Sassia, etc.), and he used to arrange concerts in Rome. In 1896 he was promoted to vice-director of the Cappella, sometimes substituting for the older maestro Domenico Mustafà. He died in Rome in 1904.

His voice can be heard, rather faintly, together with those of the other choristers on the Sistine Chapel recordings made by Fred Gaisberg in 1902.
