= Alessandro Moreschi =

Italian castrato singer (1858–1922)

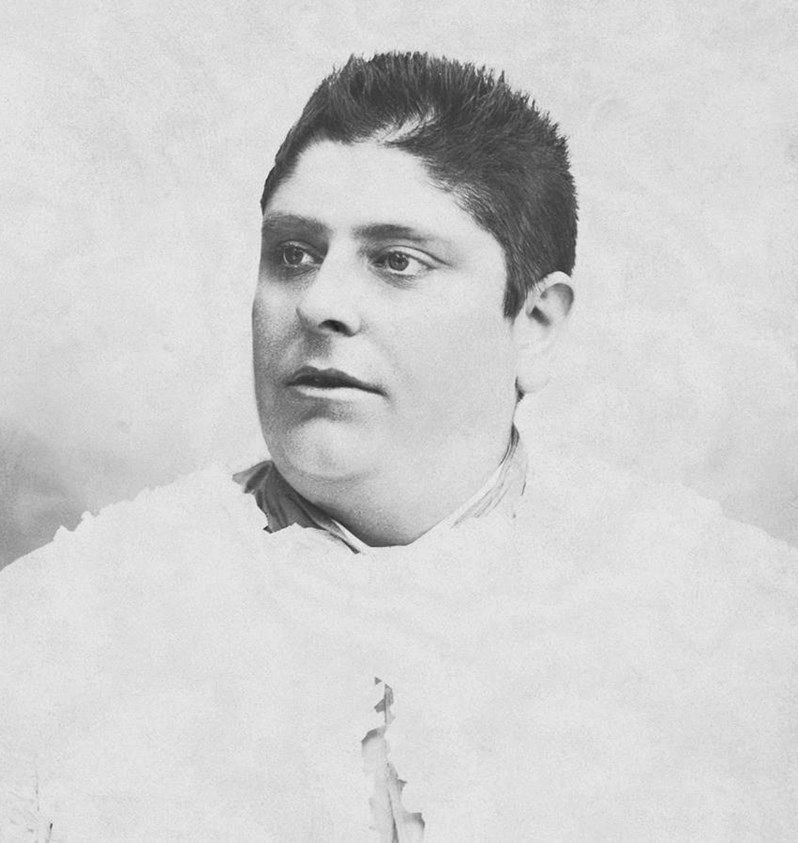
- Moreschi c. 1900
- Born: 1 November 1858; Monte Compatri, Latium, Papal States
- Died: 21 April 1922 (aged 63); Rome, Italy
- Education: Scuola di San Salvatore in Lauro
- Occupation: Classical singer

Alessandro Moreschi (1 November 1858 – 21 April 1922) was an Italian chorister of the late 19th century and the only castrato to make solo recordings.

== Early life ==
Alessandro Moreschi was born on 1 November 1858 to Luigi Lorenzo Moreschi (1840–1897) and Rosa Maria Potelli, a Roman Catholic family in the town of Monte Compatri in the Papal States, near Frascati (Lazio). It is possible that he was born with an inguinal hernia, for which castration was still thought to be a cure in 19th-century Italy. Another possibility is that he was castrated later, around 1865, which would have been more in line with the centuries-old practice of castrating vocally talented boys well before puberty. In any case, much later in life, he referred to his enjoyment of singing as a boy in the chapel of the Madonna del Castagno, just outside his native town.

== Early career ==
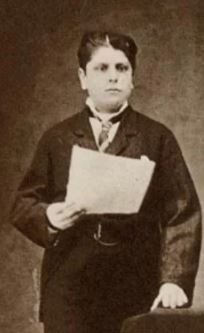
Young Alessandro Moreschi (c. 1880).

It seems likely that Moreschi's singing abilities came to the notice of Nazareno Rosati, formerly a member of the Sistine Chapel Choir, who was acting as a scout for new talent, and took him to Rome around 1870. Moreschi became a pupil at the Scuola di San Salvatore in Lauro, where he was taught by Gaetano Capocci, maestro di cappella of the Papal basilica of St John Lateran. In 1873, aged only fifteen, he was appointed First Soprano in the choir of that basilica, and also became a regular member of the groups of soloists hired by Capocci to sing in the salons of Roman high society. His singing at such soirées was vividly described by Anna Lillie de Hegermann-Lindencrone, the American wife of the Danish Ambassador to the Holy See:

Mrs Charles Bristed of New York, a recent convert to the Church of Rome, receives on Saturday evening ... The Pope's singers are the great attraction ... for her salon is the only place outside of the churches where one can hear them. The famous Moresca [sic], who sings at the Laterano, is a full-faced soprano of some forty winters. He has a tear in each note and a sigh in each breath. He sang the jewel song in [Gounod's] Faust, which seemed horribly out of place. Especially when he asks (in the hand-glass) if he is really Marguerita, one feels tempted to answer 'Macchè' [not in the least] for him.

In 1883, Capocci presented a special showcase for his protégé: the first performance in Italy of the oratorio Christus am Ölberge by Beethoven, in which Moreschi sang the demanding coloratura role of the Seraph. On the strength of this performance, he became known as l'Angelo di Roma, and shortly after, having been auditioned by all the members of the Sistine Chapel Choir, he was appointed First Soprano there, a post he held for the next thirty years.

== Sistine Chapel choir ==
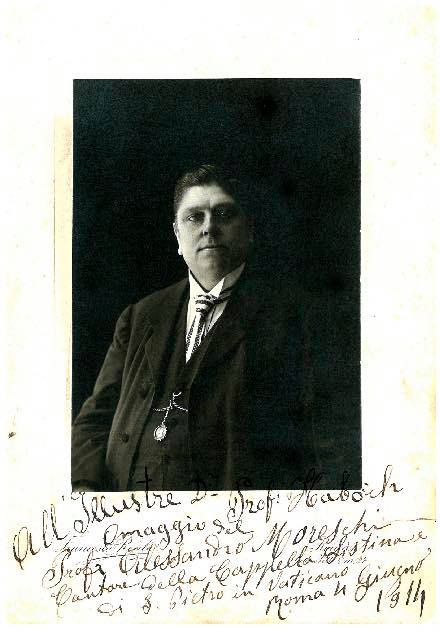
Alessandro Moreschi c. 1914

Moreschi's Director at the Sistine was Domenico Mustafà, himself once a castrato soprano, who realised that Moreschi was, amongst other things, the only hope for the continuation of the Sistine tradition of performing the famous setting of the Miserere by Gregorio Allegri during Holy Week. When Moreschi joined the Sistine choir, there were still six other castrato members, but none of them were capable of sustaining this work's taxing soprano tessitura. Moreschi's talent occasionally led to "behaviour [that] was often capricious enough to make him forget a proper professional bearing, as on the occasion after a concert when he paraded himself among the crowd like a peacock, with a long, white scarf, to be congratulated ..."

The Sistine Chapel Choir was run on centuries old traditional lines with a strict system of hierarchies. In 1886, the senior castrato, Giovanni Cesari, retired, and it was probably then that Moreschi took over as Direttore dei concertisti (Director of soloists). In 1891 Moreschi took his turn as segretario puntatore, being responsible for the day-book of the choir's activities, and the following year was appointed maestro pro tempore, a largely administrative post concerned with calling choir meetings, fixing rehearsals, granting leave of absence and the like. During this year, Alessandro was also responsible for overseeing the choir's correct performance of its duties in the Sistine Chapel. Artistically speaking, the job involved choosing soloists and in developing repertoire. This period was one of disruption within the Sistine choir's organisation as well as Catholic church music at large as the reforming movement known as Cecilianism, which had originated in Germany, began to influence Rome. Its calls for the Church's music to return to the twin bases of Gregorian chant and the polyphony of Palestrina threatened both the repertoire and the practice of the Sistine Chapel. Mustafà also appointed Lorenzo Perosi as joint Perpetual Director, a 26-year-old priest from Tortona in Piedmont and a supporter of Cecilianism. Moreschi was a witness to the struggles between the two movements, but was also involved in secular matters: on 9 August 1900, at the express request of the Italian royal family, he sang at the funeral of the recently assassinated king, Umberto I, despite the Papacy still having no formal contact with the unified Italian secular state, which it regarded as a usurper.

In the spring of 1902, in the Vatican, Moreschi made the first of his recordings for the Gramophone & Typewriter Company of London. He made additional recordings in 1904 with seventeen tracks total. During this time, Mustafà retired in 1903 and a few months later Pope Leo XIII, a strong supporter of Sistine tradition, died. His successor was Pope Pius X, a powerful advocate of Cecilianism. Among the pontiff's first official acts was the promulgation of the motu proprio, Tra le sollecitudini ("Amidst the Cares") on St Cecilia's Day, 22 November 1903, stating: "Whenever ... it is desirable to employ the high voices of sopranos and contraltos, these parts must be taken by boys, according to the most ancient usage of the Church." Moreschi and his few remaining colleagues were to be pensioned and replaced by boys.

Officially, Alessandro was a member of the Sistine choir until Easter 1913 (at which date he qualified for his pension after thirty years' service), and remained in the choir of the Cappella Giulia of St Peter's, Rome until a year after. Around Easter 1914 he met Viennese musicologist Franz Haböck, author of Die Kastraten und ihre Gesangskunst (The Castrati and their Art of Singing, published in Berlin in 1927), who had planned to cast Moreschi in concerts reviving the repertoire of the great eighteenth-century castrato Farinelli. However, Moreschi (now fifty-five years old) no longer had the required high soprano range, and had never had the necessary virtuoso operatic training.

== Retirement and death ==
In retirement, Moreschi lived in an apartment at 19 Via Plinio near the Vatican, where he died at the age of 63, possibly of pneumonia. His funeral Mass was a large and public affair in the church of San Lorenzo in Damaso, and was conducted by Perosi, who, in spite of his antipathy towards castrati, felt a "great friendship which bound them together". Moreschi was buried in the family vault in the Cimitero del Verano, the "city of the dead" not far from Rome's Tiburtina station. His colleague Domenico Salvatori lies in the same tomb.

== Appearance and personality ==
According to Haböck, "Moreschi's external appearance differs little from that usual for a singer. He is of medium or rather small stature. His likeable face is completely beardless; his chest remarkably broad and powerful. His speaking voice has a metallic quality, like a very high-speaking tenor. His voice and demeanour make a youthful impression, reinforced by his lively conversation, which add to the altogether charming picture that the singer presents."

== Recordings ==
"Hostias Et Preces" by Eugenio Terziani

"Ave Maria" by Bach/Gounod
Alessandro Moreschi performs "Ave Maria" by Bach/Gounod

All of Moreschi's recordings were made in Rome in two sets of recording sessions for the Gramophone & Typewriter Company. The first series of recordings was made on 3 and 5 April 1902 by Will and Fred Gaisberg. Eighteen usable sides by the members of the Sistine Chapel Choir were captured on wax, four of them solos by Moreschi. Decades later, Fred Gaisberg recalled making these historic first recordings in the Vatican: "Selecting a great salon with walls covered with Titians, Raphaels, and Tintorettos, we mounted our grimy machine right in the middle of the floor." The second set of recordings was made in Rome in April 1904, under the direction of W. Sinkler Darby. CDs on the Opal and Pearl labels reproduce the recordings.

== Critical opinion ==
Critical opinion is divided about Moreschi's recordings. Some say they are of little interest other than the novelty of preserving the voice of a castrato, and that Moreschi was a mediocre singer, while others detect the remains of a talented singer unfortunately past his prime by the time of recording, as Moreschi was in his mid-forties. Still, others feel that he was a very fine singer, and that much of the "difficulty" in listening to Moreschi's recordings stems from changes in taste and singing style between times. His vocal technique can certainly seem to grate upon modern ears, but many of the seemingly imperfect vocal attacks, for example, are in fact grace notes, launched from as much as a tenth below the note – in Moreschi's case, this seems to have been a long-standing means of drawing on the particular acoustics of the Sistine Chapel itself. The dated aesthetic of Moreschi's singing, involving extreme passion and a perpetual type of sob, often sounds bizarre to the modern listener, and can be misinterpreted as technical weakness or symptomatic of an aging voice.

The standard of his recordings is certainly variable; Moreschi recorded two versions of Rossini's "Crucifixus". In the first, Moreschi's first side from his first recording session in 1902, he sings off key, and continues to do so for several bars. Whatever modern opinion may be of his recordings, the enthusiastic applause of his colleagues attests to their appreciation on at least one occasion, as can be heard at the end of his rendering of Tosti's song "Ideale".

The best-known piece Moreschi recorded is the Bach/Gounod "Ave Maria" (though the Sistine Chapel choir recorded Mozart's Ave verum corpus, Moreschi's voice is not individually audible).

== In popular culture ==
British author Kingsley Amis listened to a Moreschi recording in 1973, and used his thoughts on it as the basis for the novel The Alteration (1976). The novel is set in an alternate world where the Papal choir is still recruiting castrati in the 1970s, and is told from the viewpoint of a boy considering this offer.

YouTube analog horror web series The Mandela Catalogue made by Alex Kister uses Moreschi's version of Ave Maria in the third part of the series, titled 'intruder alert'. Moreschi's version appears multiple times in the web series, and is a big part of the storyline. It is heard playing from a television showing a monotone image of a man's face, which results in the suicide of a woman and the kidnapping of a child in an infomercial type video in the web series, and is heard from various televisions throughout the series.

The British experimental music group Current 93 sampled Moreschi's version of Domine Salvum Fac in the song Where The Long Shadow Falls that appears in the EP Where the Long Shadows Fall (Beforetheinmostlight).

== Bibliography ==
- de Hegermann-Lindencrone, L. (1914). The Sunny Side of Diplomatic Life, 1875-1912. New York and London: Harper & Brothers.
- Haböck, F. [in German] (1927). Die Kastraten und ihre Gesangskunst. Berlin: Deutsche Verlags-Anstalt.
- Clapton, Nicholas (2008). Moreschi and the Voice of the Castrato. London: Haus Books. ISBN 978-1-905791-42-2. OCLC 305134935.
- Wolfson, John (1987). Alessandro Moreschi the Last Castrato Complete Vatican Recordings. Opal Pavilion Records. Opal CD 9823.
