= Giovanni Animuccia =

Italian composer

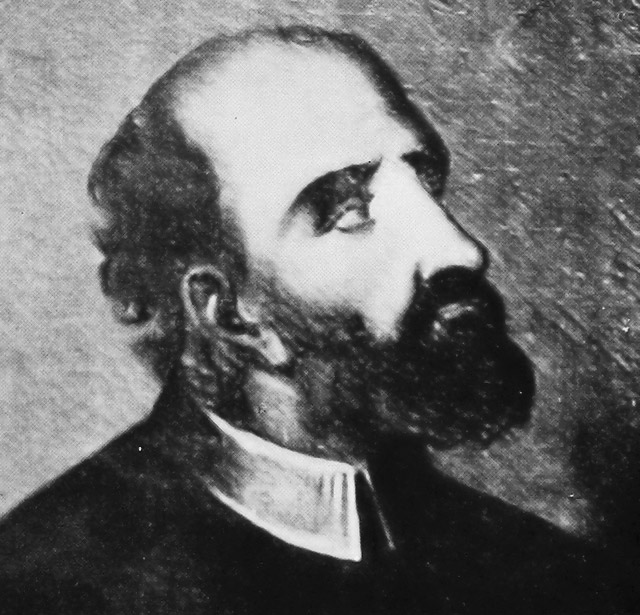
Giovanni Animuccia

Giovanni Animuccia (c. 1500 – c. 20 March 1571) was an Italian composer of the Renaissance who was involved in the heart of Rome's liturgical musical life. He was one of Giovanni Pierluigi da Palestrina's most important predecessors and possibly his mentor. As maestro di capella of St Philip Neri's Oratory and the Capella Giulia at St Peter's, he was composing music at the very center of the Roman Catholic Church, during the turbulent reforms of the Counter-Reformation and as part of the new movements that began to flourish around the middle of the century. His music reflects these changes.

== Early life: Florence ==
Animuccia was born in Florence around the beginning of the 16th century. The exact date is variously given as the end of the 15th century, c. 1500, c. 1514, and c. 1520. His brother Paolo Animuccia was also a celebrated composer. However, little is known about their training and work during this period. Giovanni's first and second book of madrigals show similarities with, and may have been modeled on, the music of his slightly older contemporary Francesco Corteccia, court composer to Duke Cosimo I de' Medici. Animuccia and Corteccia were the only significant composers writing madrigals in Florence at the time and both composers published books of madrigals around 1547. (Animuccia's Madrigali e Motetti a quattro e cinque voci—Madrigals and Motets for Four and Five Voices—was published at Venice in 1548.) Animuccia's name is also mentioned in association with Florentine literary circles, suggesting that he was involved with cultural life in Florence. Animuccia's second book of madrigals was published in 1551 after his arrival in Rome.

== Rome ==
After his arrival in Rome in 1550, Animuccia was employed by Cardinal Guido Ascanio Sforza. Early on, through his association with Florentine circles (in particular the exiled Altoviti family), Animuccia met his fellow Florentine St Phillip Neri.

=== Music for the oratory ===
St Phillip Neri founded a religious congregation called the Oratory. The Oratory began in the early 1550s as small and informal meetings for religious discussion and prayer; these meetings soon began to attract large numbers of people. In 1558, when Phillip obtained a larger room to hold the meetings in, the practice of singing of laudi spirituali was introduced. Singing laudi was a popular practice in Florence following the legacy of Girolamo Savonarola who strongly encouraged its use, and it is natural therefore that Phillip would incorporate this practice into his meetings. Although the precise date is unknown, Animuccia was involved with music for these meetings from early on and remained maestro di capella of the Oratory until his death. Neri was so pleased with Animuccia that he said he had "seen [his] soul... fly upwards towards heaven". The Oratory was able to attract many musicians who volunteered their services; this included the famous singer Francesco Soto de Langa from the Capella Sistina, the composer Palestrina, and probably the composer Tomás Luis de Victoria who lived in the same house as St. Phillip Neri for five years.

Animuccia published two books of laudi for use in the Oratory in 1563 and 1570. His work formed the basis of the oratorios that did not descend from the polyphonic Gregorian "Passions". Animuccia's Florentine influence is evident as some of his texts originate from Florence. Stylistically the two books are rather different. Animuccia's first book contains simple settings of Italian laudi which are homophonic throughout, and were probably sung by amateur singers as part of Phillip Neri's early devotional meetings. The music in Animuccia's second book of laudi is much more madrigal-like; he uses a greater variety of textures, sonorities, and languages (Latin and Italian). His reasons for the change in style are stated in his dedication:

The oratory having increased, by the grace of God, with the coming together of prelates and of most important gentlemen, it seemed to me fitting in this second book to increase the harmony and the combination of parts, varying the music in diverse ways, now setting it to Latin words and now to the vernacular, sometimes with a greater number of voices and sometimes with fewer, with verses now of one kind and now of another, concerning myself as little as possible with imitations and complexities, in order not to obscure the understanding of the words.

By this time, the number of people attending the Oratory had increased significantly, and Animuccia wished to offer more complex music to "woo influential people through music into churches."

== Effects of the Counter-Reformation on Animuccia's music ==
Animuccia was employed as the magister cantorum of the Capella Giulia at St. Peter's Basilica on the Vatican from January 1555, following Palestrina's promotion by Pope Julius III to the Capella Sistina. Animuccia's most important composition for this period was his Il primo Libra di Messe (Latin: Missarum Liber Primus; 1567). The importance of this book of Masses is due to the fact that its style of composition was directly affected by the liturgical reforms that took place at the Council of Trent through the influence of the Reform Commission in Rome. He held the office until his death at Rome in 1571, succeeded by Palestrina who was his friend and probably his pupil.

=== The Council of Trent and the Reform Commission ===
The final session of the Council of Trent closed in 1563. One of the primary concerns of the council in its latter stages was the reform of the liturgy, in particular the reform of ‘abuses of the Mass’. To carry out the Council's recommendations in Rome, a Reform Commission was set up, headed up by Cardinals Carlo Borromeo and Vitellozzo Vitelli. The main issues that Cardinals Borromeo and Vitelli sought to address regarding music were ‘intelligibility’ (i.e., that Masses should be composed so words could be clearly understood) and the use of secular music in Mass settings. In 1565, the diary of the papal chapel choir recorded that Cardinal Vitelli requested that the choir assemble at his house for a private test of some Mass settings to see whether the words could be understood.

=== Animuccia's response ===
Animuccia, as magister cantorum of the Capella Giulia, would no doubt have been aware of this test; it is unsurprising therefore that in 1566 there is a record of him being paid "for the composition of five masses [written] according to the requirements of the Council [of Trent]." Animuccia's Il primo Libra di Messe was published at Rome a year later. In his dedication he writes:

...I have sought to adorn these divine praises of God in such a way that the music may disturb the hearing of the text as little as possible, but nevertheless in such a way that it may not be entirely devoid of artifice and may contribute in some measure to the listener's pleasure.

All the Masses are freely composed plainsong paraphrases - which fulfills the requirement of the eradication of secular influences. Animuccia's presentation of an ‘intelligible’ style is only evident in the Gloria and the Credo, and even here he seems reluctant to strip all ‘artifice’ from the music. Instead he alternates homophonic phrases with polyphonic phrases. In his book of Masses Animuccia is consciously trying to compose music that reconciles, as he sees it, the two polarities in this issue of composing ‘intelligible’ music: that of making the text audible, yet at the same time sounding beautiful – therefore fulfilling the music's most important function of drawing the listener deeper into prayer and closer to God. Other significant stylistic features of Animuccia's composition style include variations in vocal textures and color by varying voice groupings, and instances of word painting.

Other works composed by Animuccia in this period include some madrigali spirituali (1565) and a collection of hymns, motets, Masses and Magnificats (1568).

== Legacy ==
The stylistic features described in Animuccia's masses and laudi can be seen as antecedent to the way choral music would develop from the end of the 16th century into the 17th century. In particular his use of different voice groupings can be seen as a very early example of the polychoral technique (chori spezzati) which became very popular in Rome shortly after Animuccia's death. Although Animuccia's contribution to liturgical musical at this time was soon eclipsed by choral works of his contemporaries Palestrina and Victoria, his music remains an important example as to one of the ways in which a composer sought to deal with the issues which arose after the Council of Trent. As well as this, his significant contribution to the early musical life of the Oratory set precedence for future developments of music written for this setting, which would eventually include the development of the oratorio.
