= Zacconi =

Zacconi is an Italian surname. Notable people with the surname include:

- Ermete Zacconi (1857–1948), Italian stage and film actor
- Giuseppe Zacconi (1910–1970), Italian director
- Lodovico Zacconi (1555–1627), Italian-Austrian composer and musical theorist
