= Giuseppe Liberto =

Monsignor Giuseppe Liberto
- Born: 21 August 1943)
- Offices held: Director of the Choir of the Sistine Chapel

Giuseppe Liberto (Chiusa Sclafani, 21 August 1943) is an Italian priest, choral director and composer. He was director of the Choir of the Sistine Chapel 1997–2010.

== Life ==
In 1997 Pope John Paul II called upon Liberto to serve as the Director of the Choir of the Sistine Chapel. He held this position until October 2021.
