= John Rosselli (historian) =

Italian-born British historian

John Rosselli (8 June 1927, Florence – 16 January 2001, Cambridge) was an Italian-born British historian, academic, journalist, music critic, and writer on music. He earned degrees in history from Swarthmore College in the United States and the University of Cambridge in England; studying under Herbert Butterfield at the latter institution from 1948 through 1951. After completing his education, he worked as a features writer, editor, and critic for The Guardian; rising to the post of deputy London editor. He left the paper in 1964 to join the faculty of University of Sussex where he became a reader and taught history until 1989. He wrote extensively on the history of Italian music, particularly opera. His books include The Opera Industry in Italy from Cimarosa to Verdi: The Role of the Impresario (Cambridge University Press, 1984), Music and Musicians in Nineteenth-Century Italy (1991, Batsford Books), Singers of Italian Opera: The History of a Profession (1995, Cambridge University Press), The Life of Bellini (1996, Cambridge University Press), The Life of Mozart (1998, Cambridge University Press), and The Life of Verdi (Cambridge, 2000).
