= Giuseppe Baini =

Italian composer

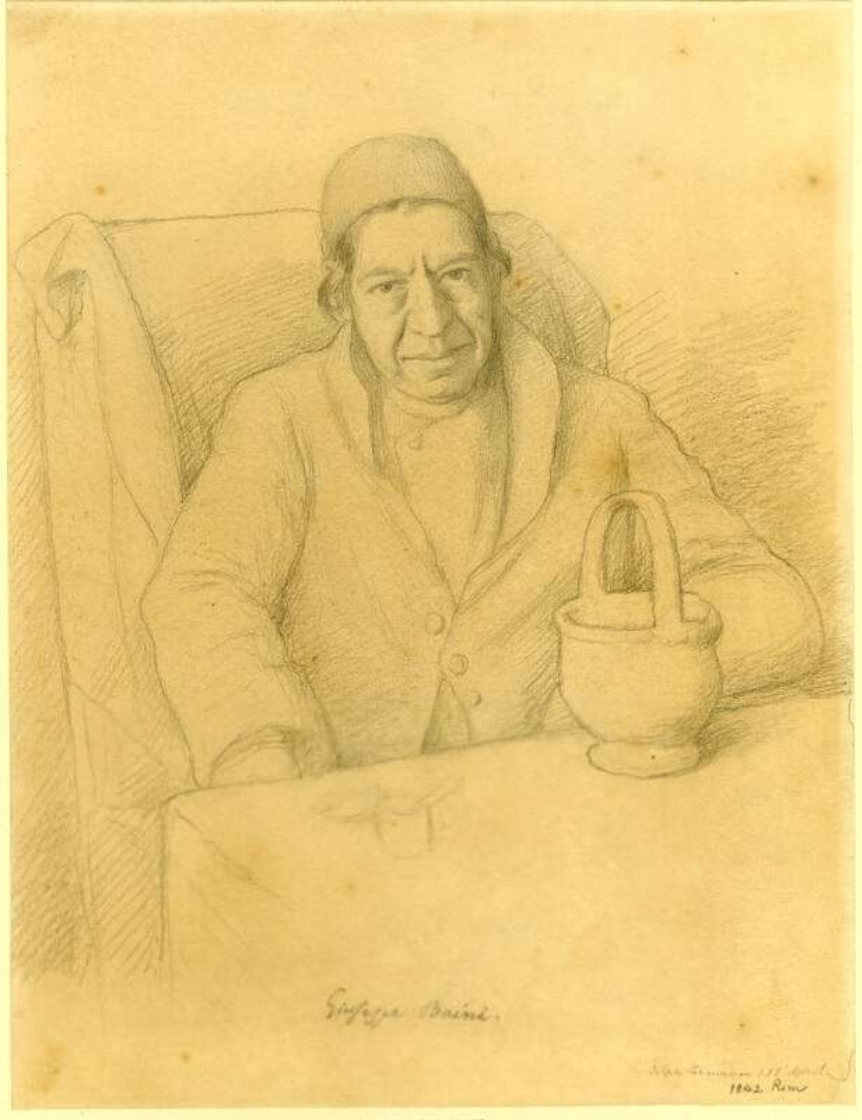
Portrait of Giuseppe Baini drawn by Rudolf Lehmann in Rome, 1842.

Abbate Giuseppe Baini (21 October 1775 – 21 May 1844) was an Italian priest, music critic, conductor, and composer of church music.

He was born in Rome. He was instructed in composition by his uncle, Lorenzo Baini, and afterwards by G. Jannaconi. In 1814, he was appointed musical director to the choir of the pontifical chapel, to which he had gained admission in 1795 because of his fine bass voice, which was said to be powerful, extending from low E♭ to high G. His compositions, of which very few were published, were considered favourable specimens of the severe ecclesiastical style; a ten-part Miserere of his, composed for Holy Week in 1821 by order of Pope Pius VII, has taken a permanent place in the services of the Sistine Chapel during Passion Week. Baini held a higher place, however, as a musical critic and historian than as a composer, and his Life of Palestrina (Memorie storico-critiche della vita e delle opere di Giovanni Pierluigi da Palestrina, 1828) was described by the 1911 Encyclopædia Britannica as being "one of the best works of its class". The phrase Il Principe della Musica, which has become firmly associated with the name of Palestrina, is found in the aforementioned biography.

Baini's book on Palestrina established the 19th century attitude of hero worship towards the Renaissance master of counterpoint, and also named him as the "savior of church music" versus the alleged "ban on counterpoint" by the Council of Trent. Contemporary scholarship, while not claiming that this view was entirely false, tends to hold that it was highly exaggerated; Palestrina was one of many skilled composers working at the time, and the influence of the Council of Trent on musical composition was more limited than at first presumed (the composers of the Venetian School, for example, ignored it almost entirely, and Palestrina-style composers such as Lassus, working in Munich, were also quite free to write as they pleased). Regardless of its failings, however, Baini's book was influential and did much to bring Renaissance music back into the attention of 19th century musicians as well as the general public.

Giuseppe Baini died in May 1844 in Rome.
