= Castrato =

Male singer who is castrated to maintain a high voice

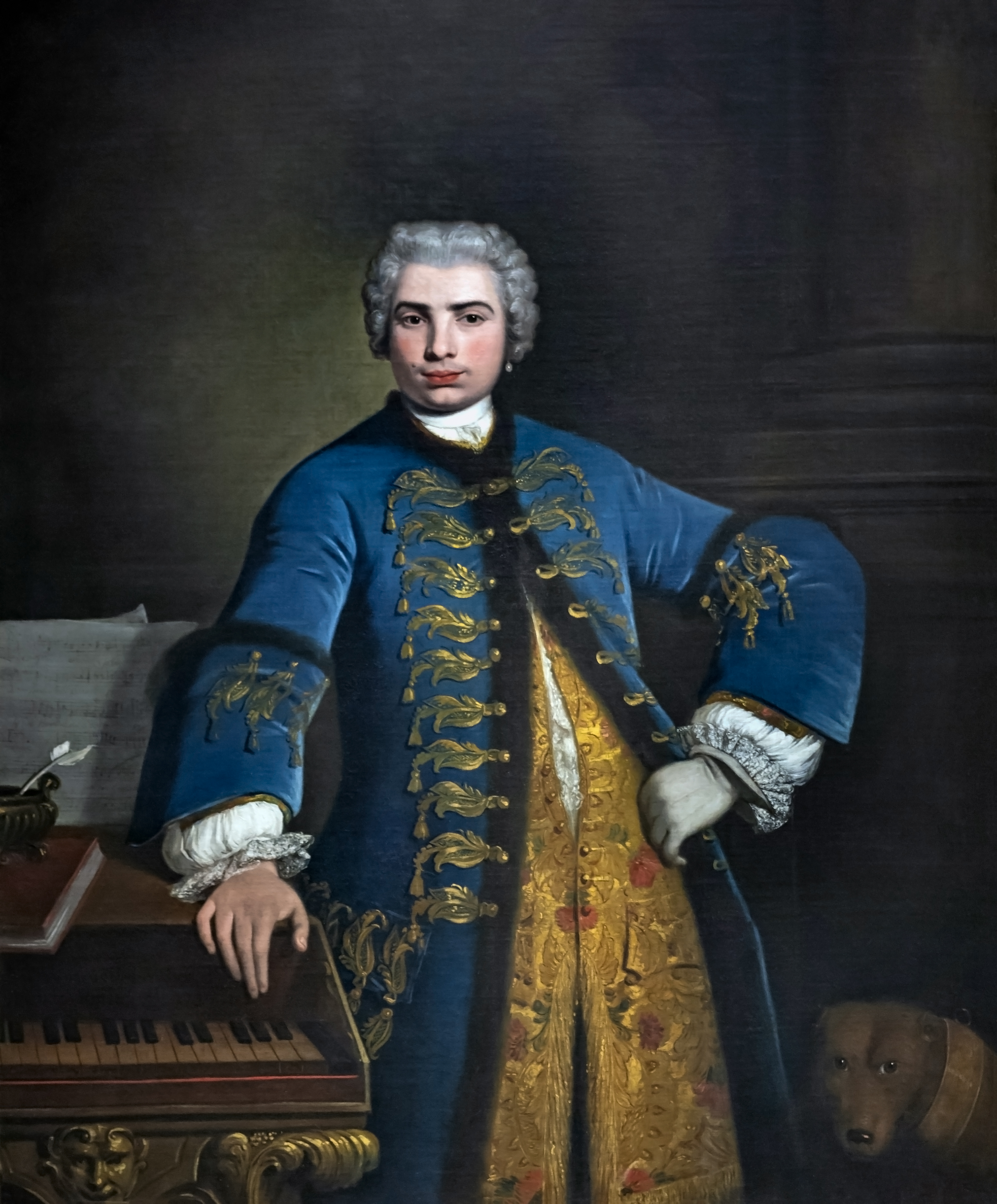
The 18th-century castrato Farinelli, painted by Bartolomeo Nazari

A castrato (Italian; pl.: castrati) is a male singer who underwent castration before puberty in order to retain a singing voice equivalent to that of a soprano, mezzo-soprano, or contralto. The voice can also occur in one who, due to an endocrinological condition, never reaches sexual maturity.

Castration before puberty (or in its early stages) prevents the larynx from being transformed by the normal physiological events of puberty. As a result, the vocal range of prepubescence (shared by both sexes) is largely retained, and the voice develops into adulthood in a unique way. Prepubescent castration for this purpose diminished greatly in the late 18th century.

Methods of castration used to terminate the onset of puberty varied. Methods involved using opium to medically induce a coma, then submerging the boy into an ice or milk bath where the procedure of either twisting the testicles until they atrophied, or complete removal via surgical cutting was performed. However, the complete removal of the testicles was not a widely performed technique. The procedure was usually done to boys around the age of 8–10; recovery time from the procedure took around two weeks. The means by which future singers were prepared could lead to premature death. To prevent the child from experiencing the intense pain of castration, many were inadvertently administered lethal doses of opium or some other narcotic. Others inadvertently died from extended compression of the carotid artery in the neck, intended to render them unconscious during the castration procedure.

The geographical locations of where these procedures took place is not known specifically. During the 18th century, the music historian Charles Burney was sent from pillar to post in search of places where the operation was carried out:

I enquired throughout Italy at what place boys were chiefly qualified for singing by castration, but could get no certain intelligence. I was told at Milan that it was at Venice; at Venice that it was at Bologna; but at Bologna the fact was denied, and I was referred to Florence; from Florence to Rome, and from Rome I was sent to Naples. The operation most certainly is against the law in all these places, as well as against nature; and all the Italians are so much ashamed of it, that in every province they transfer it some other.

As a castrato's body grew, his lack of testosterone meant that his epiphyses (bone-joints) did not harden in the normal manner. Thus, the limbs of the castrati often grew unusually long, as did their ribs. This, combined with intensive training, gave them unrivaled lung power and breath capacity. Operating through small, child-sized vocal cords, their voices were also extraordinarily flexible, and quite different from the equivalent adult female voice. Their vocal range was higher than that of the uncastrated adult male. Listening to the only surviving recordings of a castrato (see below), one can hear that the lower part of the voice sounds like a "super-high" tenor, with a more falsetto-like upper register above that.

Castrati were rarely referred to as such: in the 18th century, the euphemism musico (pl.: musici) was much more generally used, although it usually carried derogatory implications; another synonym was evirato, literally meaning "emasculated". Eunuch is a more general term since, historically, many eunuchs were castrated after puberty and thus the castration had no effect on their voices.

== Historical background ==
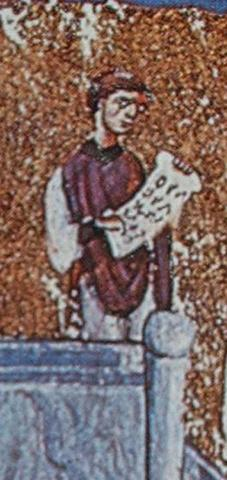
A Byzantine castrato from the 11th century

Castration as a means of subjugation, enslavement or other punishment has a very long history, dating back to ancient Sumer. In a Western context, eunuch singers are known to have existed from the early Byzantine Empire. In Constantinople around 400 AD, the empress Aelia Eudoxia had a eunuch choir-master, Brison, who may have established the use of castrati in Byzantine choirs, though whether Brison himself was a singer and whether he had colleagues who were eunuch singers is not certain. By the 9th century, eunuch singers were well-known (most in the choir of Hagia Sophia) and remained so until the sack of Constantinople by the Western forces of the Fourth Crusade in 1204. Their fate from then until their reappearance in Italy more than three hundred years later is not clear. It seems likely that the Spanish tradition of soprano falsettists may have hidden castrati. Much of Spain was under Muslim rulers during the Middle Ages, and castration had a history going back to the ancient Near East. Stereotypically, eunuchs served as harem guards, but they were also valued as high-level political appointees since they could not start a dynasty which would threaten the ruler.

== European classical tradition ==
Castrati first appeared in Italy in the mid-16th century, though at first the terms describing them were not always clear. The phrase soprano maschio (male soprano), which could also mean falsettist, occurs in the Due Dialoghi della Musica (Two dialogues upon music) of Luigi Dentice, an Oratorian priest, published in Rome in 1553. On 9 November 1555 Cardinal Ippolito II d'Este (famed as the builder of the Villa d'Este at Tivoli), wrote to Guglielmo Gonzaga, Duke of Mantua (1538–1587), that he has heard that the Duke was interested in his cantoretti (little singers) and offered to send him two, so that he could choose one for his own service. This is a rare term but probably does equate to castrato. The cardinal's nephew, Alfonso II d'Este, Duke of Ferrara, was another early enthusiast, inquiring about castrati in 1556.

There were certainly castrati in the Sistine Chapel choir in 1558, although not described as such: on 27 April of that year, Hernando Bustamante, a Spaniard from Palencia, was admitted (the first castrati so termed who joined the Sistine choir were Pietro Paolo Folignato and Girolamo Rossini, admitted in 1599). Surprisingly, considering the later French distaste for castrati, they certainly existed in France at this time also, being known of in Paris, Orléans, Picardy and Normandy, though they were not abundant: the King of France himself had difficulty in obtaining them. By 1574, there were castrati in the Ducal court chapel at Munich, where the Kapellmeister (music director) was the famous Orlando di Lasso. In 1589, by the bull Cum pro nostro pastorali munere, Pope Sixtus V re-organised the choir of St Peter's, Rome specifically to include castrati.

Thus the castrati came to supplant both boys (whose voices broke after only a few years) and falsettists (whose voices were weaker and less reliable) from the top line in such choirs. Women were banned by the Pauline dictum mulieres in ecclesiis taceant ("let women keep silent in the churches"; see I Corinthians, ch. 14, v. 34). The Italian castrati were often rumored to have unusually long lives, but a 1993 study found that their lifespans were average.

== Opera ==
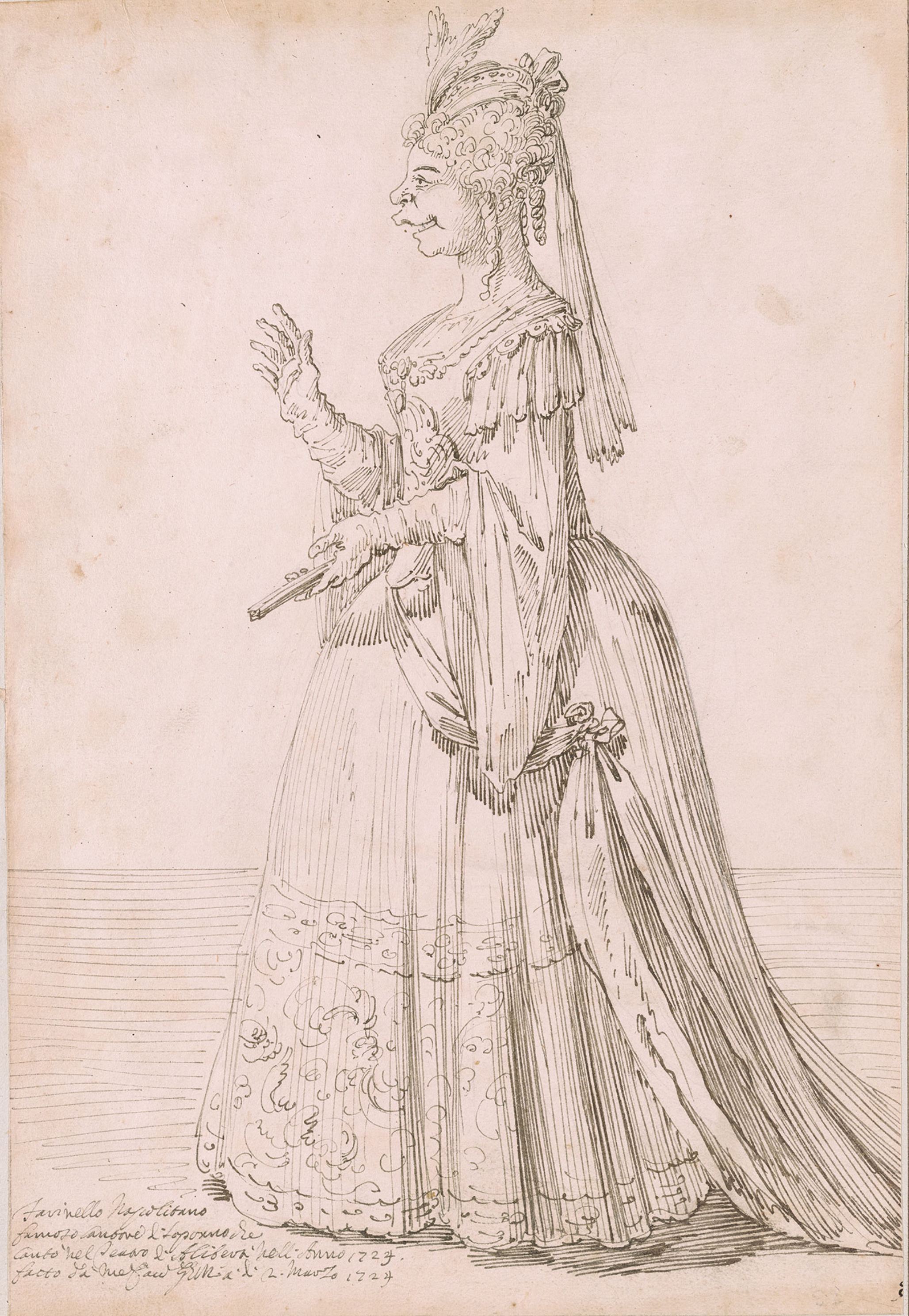
A caricature of Farinelli in a female role, by Pier Leone Ghezzi, 1724

Although the castrato (or musico) predates opera, there is some evidence that castrati had parts in the earliest operas. In the first performance of Monteverdi's Orfeo (1607), for example, they played subsidiary roles, including Speranza and (possibly) that of Euridice. Although female roles were performed by castrati in some of the papal states, this was increasingly rare; by 1680, they had supplanted normal male voices in lead roles, and retained their position as primo uomo for about a hundred years; an Italian opera not featuring at least one renowned castrato in a lead part would be doomed to fail. Because of the popularity of Italian opera throughout 18th-century Europe (except France), singers such as Ferri, Farinelli, Senesino and Pacchierotti became the first operatic superstars, earning enormous fees and hysterical public adulation. The strictly hierarchical organisation of opera seria favoured their high voices as symbols of heroic virtue, though they were frequently mocked for their strange appearance and bad acting. In his 1755 Reflections upon theatrical expression in tragedy, Roger Pickering wrote:

Farinelli drew every Body to the Haymarket. What a Pipe! What Modulation! What Extasy to the Ear! But, Heavens! What Clumsiness! What Stupidity! What Offence to the Eye! Reader, if of the City, thou mayest probably have seen in the Fields of Islington or Mile-End or, If thou art in the environs of St James', thou must have observed in the Park with what Ease and Agility a cow, heavy with calf, has rose up at the command of the Milk-woman's foot: thus from the mossy bank sprang the DIVINE FARINELLI.

The training of the boys was rigorous. The regimen of one singing school in Rome (c. 1700) consisted of one hour of singing difficult and awkward pieces, one hour practising trills, one hour practising ornamented passaggi, one hour of singing exercises in their teacher's presence and in front of a mirror so as to avoid unnecessary movement of the body or facial grimaces, and one hour of literary study; all this, moreover, before lunch. After, half an hour would be devoted to musical theory, another to writing counterpoint, an hour copying down the same from dictation, and another hour of literary study. During the remainder of the day, the young castrati had to find time to practice their harpsichord playing, and to compose vocal music, either sacred or secular depending on their inclination. This demanding schedule meant that, if sufficiently talented, they were able to make a debut in their mid-teens with a perfect technique and a voice of a flexibility and power no woman or ordinary male singer could match.

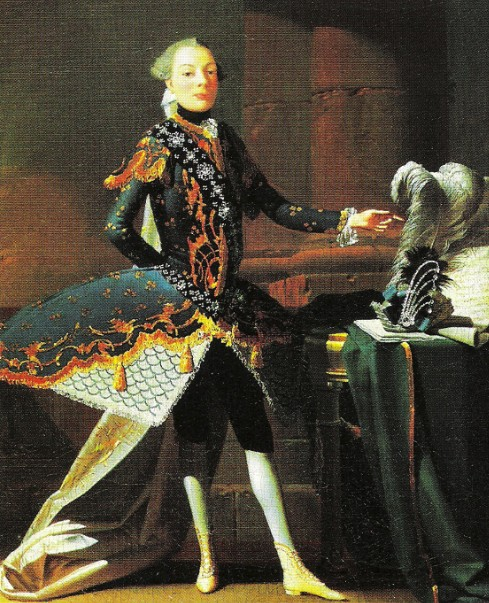
The castrato Carlo Scalzi, by Joseph Flipart, c. 1737

Many castrati came from poor homes and were castrated by their parents in the hope that their child might be successful and lift them from poverty (this was the case with Senesino). There are, though, records of some young boys asking to be operated on to preserve their voices (e.g. Caffarelli, who was from a wealthy family: his grandmother gave him the income from two vineyards to pay for his studies). Caffarelli was also typical of many castrati in being famous for tantrums on and off-stage, and for amorous adventures with noble ladies. Some, as described by Casanova, preferred gentlemen (noble or otherwise).

According to John Rosselli, the total number of castrati alive at any given time during the height of their existence cannot be ascertained. He estimates that "several hundred" of them existed at any given time between 1630 and 1750. Approximately 100 existed in Rome in 1694, but the possibility that was a decline from earlier in the century cannot be ruled out. Only a small percentage of boys castrated to preserve their voices had successful careers on the operatic stage; the better "also-rans" sang in cathedral or church choirs, but because of their marked appearance and the ban on their marrying, there was little room for them in society outside a musical context.

The castrati came in for a great amount of scurrilous and unkind abuse, and as their fame increased, so did the hatred of them. They were often castigated as malign creatures who lured men into homosexuality. There were homosexual castrati, as Casanova's accounts of 18th-century Italy bear witness. He mentions meeting an abbé whom he took for a girl in disguise, only later discovering that "she" was a famous castrato. In Rome in 1762 he attended a performance at which the prima donna was a castrato, "the favourite pathic" of Cardinal Borghese, who dined every evening with his protector. From his behaviour on stage "it was obvious that he hoped to inspire the love of those who liked him as a man, and probably would not have done so as a woman".

== Decline ==
By the late 18th century, changes in operatic taste and social attitudes spelled the end for castrati. They lingered on past the end of the ancien régime, which their style of opera parallels, and two of their number, Pacchierotti and Crescentini, performed before Napoleon. The last great operatic castrato was Giovanni Battista Velluti, who performed the last operatic castrato role ever written: Armando in Il crociato in Egitto by Meyerbeer (Venice, 1824). However, the atmosphere surrounding them had by then changed profoundly. When Velluti arrived in London in 1825 to present Il crociato in Egitto, he encountered hostility from his colleagues, who were no longer accustomed to castrati. Madame Vestris, the King's Theatre's principal contralto, flatly refused to appear on stage alongside him, even offering to pay for a substitute out of her own pocket. Ultimately, the impresarios hired a very young Maria Garcia (destined to achieve great fame under her married name, Malibran), while Madame Vestris decided to quit the King's Theatre company and abandon her Italian opera career for good.

Thus, in the early decades of the 19th century, castrati were rapidly displaced as the first men of the operatic stage—initially, for the most part, by contraltos in male roles, and later, definitively, by a new breed of heroic tenor, as first incarnated by the Frenchman Gilbert-Louis Duprez, the earliest so-called "king of the high Cs".

Following the unification of Italy in 1861, "eviration" became illegal for good throughout the new state, inasmuch as it adopted the Kingdom of Sardinia's pre-existing penal code that expressly prohibited the practice. By way of exception, the more advanced Tuscan Penal Code of 1853 remained in force within the territory of the former Grand Duchy until 1889; but Articles 325 and 326 of that code already defined the crime of "bodily harm" (lesione personale), classifying it as "most grievous" (gravissima) in various instances—including cases where the victim was deprived of the "capacity to procreate" (capacità di generare).

In 1878, Pope Leo XIII prohibited the hiring of new castrati by the church: only in the Sistine Chapel and in other papal basilicas in Rome did a few castrati linger. A group photo of the Sistine Choir taken in 1898 shows that by then only six remained, plus the Direttore Perpetuo, the fine soprano castrato Domenico Mustafà. In 1902, a ruling was extracted from Pope Leo that no further castrati should be admitted. The official end to the castrati came on St. Cecilia's Day, 22 November 1903, when the new pope, Pius X, issued his motu proprio, Tra le Sollecitudini ("Amongst the Cares"), which contained this instruction: "Whenever ... it is desirable to employ the high voices of sopranos and contraltos, these parts must be taken by boys, according to the most ancient usage of the Church."

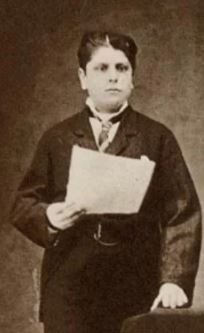
Alessandro Moreschi, the last of the Sistine castrati

A castrato singing
Alessandro Moreschi performs part of Eugenio Terziani's Hostias et preces

The last Sistine castrato to survive was Alessandro Moreschi, the only castrato to have made solo recordings. While an interesting historical record, these discs of his give us only a glimpse of the castrato voice. Although he had been renowned as "The Angel of Rome" at the beginning of his career, some would say he was past his prime when the recordings were made in 1902 and 1904 and he never attempted to sing opera. Domenico Salvatori, a castrato who was contemporary with Moreschi, made some ensemble recordings with him but has no surviving solo recordings. The recording technology of the day was not of modern high quality. Salvatori died in 1909; Moreschi retired officially in March 1913, and died in 1922.

The Catholic Church's involvement in the castrato phenomenon has long been controversial, and there have recently been calls for it to issue an official apology for its role. As early as 1748, Pope Benedict XIV tried to ban castrati from churches, but although he opposed the practice, he refused to introduce a total prohibition, recognizing practical limits to enforcing such a ban.

The rumours of another castrato sequestered in the Vatican for the personal delectation of the Pontiff until as recently as 1959 have been proven false. The singer in question was a pupil of Moreschi's, Domenico Mancini, such a successful imitator of his teacher's voice that even Lorenzo Perosi, Direttore Perpetuo of the Sistine Choir from 1898 to 1956 and a strenuous opponent of the practice of castrato singers, thought he was a castrato. Mancini was in fact a moderately skillful falsettist and professional double bass player.

== Modern castrati and similar voices ==
A male can retain his child voice if it never changes during puberty. The retained voice can be the treble voice shared by both sexes in childhood and is the same as a boy soprano voice. But as evidence shows, many castrati, such as Senesino and Caffarelli, were actually altos (mezzo-soprano) – not sopranos. So-called "natural" or "endocrinological castrati" are born with hormonal anomalies, such as Klinefelter's syndrome and Kallmann's syndrome, or have undergone unusual physical or medical events during their early lives that reproduce the vocal effects of castration without being castrated.

Jimmy Scott, Radu Marian, and Javier Medina are examples of this type of high male voice via endocrinological conditions. Michael Maniaci is somewhat different, in that he has no hormonal or other anomalies, but claims that his voice did not "break" in the usual manner, leaving him still able to sing in the soprano register. Other uncastrated male adults sing soprano, generally using some form of falsetto but in a much higher range than most countertenors. Examples are Aris Christofellis, Jörg Waschinski, and Ghio Nannini.

However, it is believed the castrati possessed more of a tenorial chest register (the aria "Navigante che non spera" in Leonardo Vinci's opera Il Medo, written for Farinelli, requires notes down to C_{3}, 131 Hz). Similar low-voiced singing can be heard from the jazz vocalist Jimmy Scott, whose range matches approximately that used by female blues singers. High-pitched singer Jordan Smith has demonstrated having more of a tenorial chest register.

Actor Chris Colfer has stated in interviews that when his voice began to change at puberty, he sang in a high voice "constantly" in an effort to retain his range. Actor and singer Alex Newell has soprano range. Voice actor Walter Tetley may or may not have been a castrato; Bill Scott, a co-worker of Tetley's during their later work in television, once half-jokingly quipped that Tetley's mother "had him fixed" to protect the child star's voice-acting career. Tetley never did personally divulge the exact reason for his condition, which left him with the voice of a preteen boy for his entire adult life. Botanist George Washington Carver was noted for his high voice, believed to be the result of pertussis and croup infections in his childhood that stunted his growth.

== Notable castrati ==
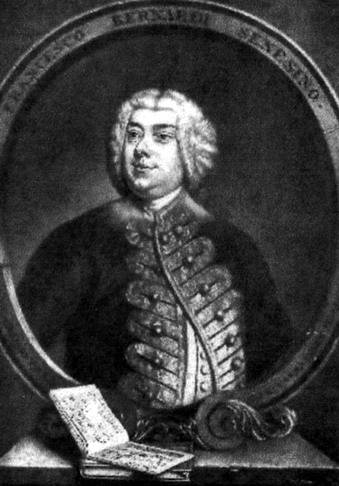
Francesco Bernardi, known as "Senesino"

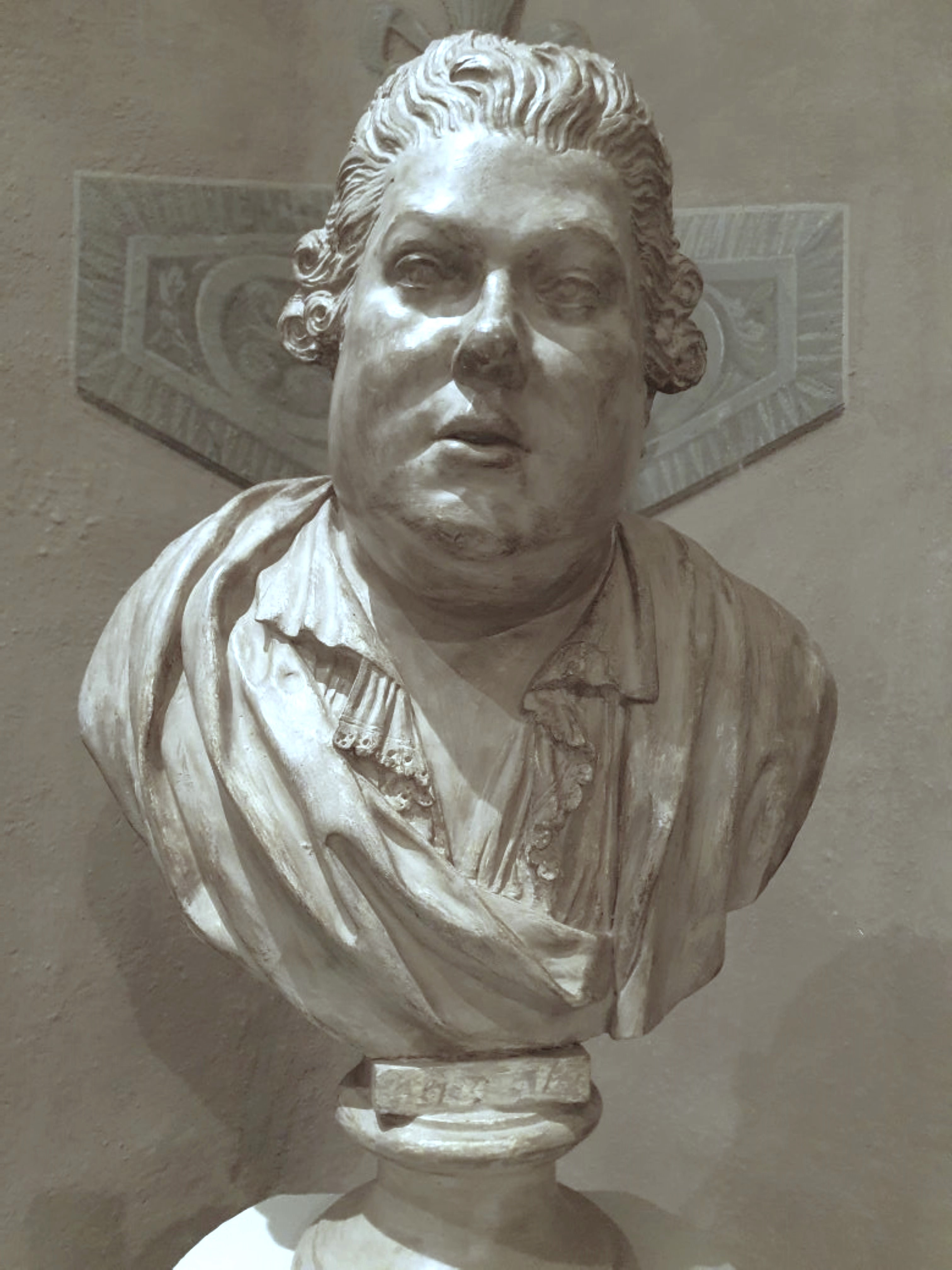
Bust of Antonio Bernacchi (unknown author, 19th century, Museo internazionale e biblioteca della musica, Bologna)

- Loreto Vittori (1604–1670)
- Baldassare Ferri (1610–1680)
- Atto Melani (1626–1714)
- Giovanni Grossi ("Siface") (1653–1697)
- Pier Francesco Tosi (1654–1732)
- Francesco Ceccarelli (1752–1814)
- Nicolò Grimaldi ("Nicolini") (1673–1732)
- Gaetano Berenstadt (1687–1734)
- Carlo Mannelli (1640–1697)
- Antonio Bernacchi (1685–1756)
- Francesco Bernardi ("Senesino") (1686–1758)
- Valentino Urbani ("Valentini") (1690–1722)
- Francesco Paolo Masullo (1679–1733)
- Giacinto Fontana ("Farfallino") (1692–1739)
- Giuseppe Aprile (1731–1813)
- Giovanni Carestini ("Cusanino") (c. 1704 – c. 1760)
- Carlo Broschi ("Farinelli") (1705–1782)
- Domenico Annibali ("Domenichino") (1705–1779)
- Gaetano Majorano ("Caffarelli") (1710–1783)
- Francesco Soto de Langa (1534-1619)
- Felice Salimbeni (1712–1752)
- Antonio Baldi (fl. 1714 – c. 1735)
- Gioacchino Conti ("Gizziello") (1714–1761)
- Giovanni Battista Mancini (1714 –1800)
- Giovanni Manzuoli (1720–1782)
- Gaetano Guadagni (1725–1792)
- Giusto Fernando Tenducci (c. 1736–1790)
- Giuseppe Millico ("Il Muscovita") (1737–1802)
- Angelo Maria Monticelli (1710–1764)
- Gaspare Pacchierotti (1740–1821)
- Venanzio Rauzzini (1746–1810)
- Luigi Marchesi ("Marchesini") (1754–1829)
- Vincenzo dal Prato (1756–1828)
- Girolamo Crescentini (1762–1848)
- Francesco Antonio Pistocchi (1659–1726)
- Giovanni Battista "Giambattista" Velluti (1781–1861)
- Domenico Mustafà (1829–1912)
- Giovanni Cesari (1843–1904)
- Domenico Salvatori (1855–1909)
- Alessandro Moreschi (1858–1922)

== See also ==
- Cry to Heaven
- The Alteration
- Farinelli (film)
- Sarrasine
- Eunuch
- Comprachicos
