= Chronological list of Italian classical composers =

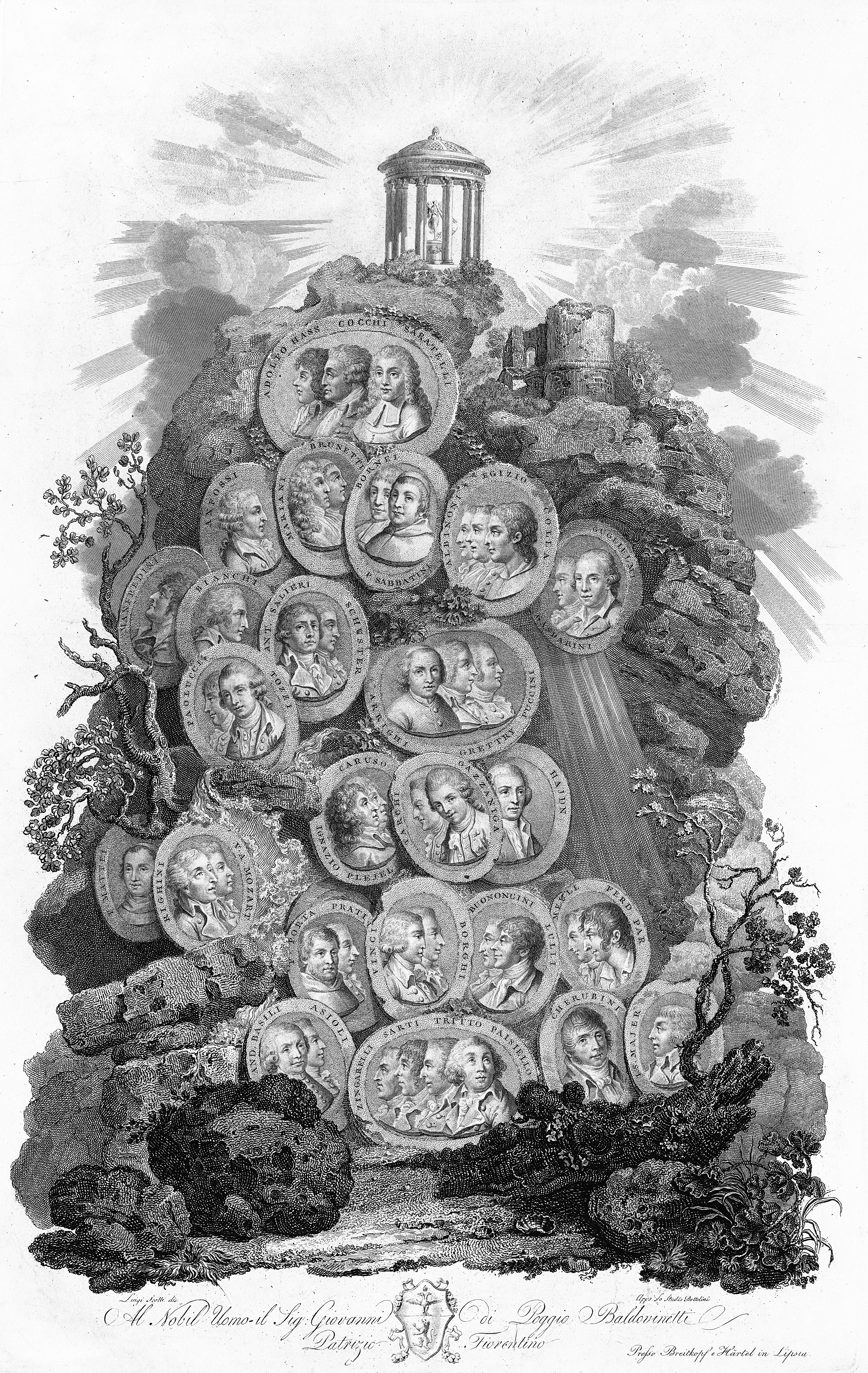
Tableau of Italian composers, c. 1790, by Pietro Bettelini (1763–1829)

This is a chronological list of classical music composers from Italy, whose notability is established by reliable sources in other Wikipedia articles.

== Medieval ==
- Maestro Piero (before 1300 – c. 1350)
- Gherardello da Firenze (c. 1320/1325 – c. 1362)
- Jacopo da Bologna (fl. 1340 – 1360)
- Giovanni da Cascia (Giovanni da Firenze) (14th century)
- Vincenzo da Rimini (14th century)
- Lorenzo da Firenze (Lorenzo Masini) (died 1372/1373)
- Francesco Landini (c. 1325/1335 – 1397)
- Donato da Cascia (fl. c. 1350 – 1370)
- Bartolino da Padova (fl. c. 1365 – c. 1405)
- Niccolò da Perugia (later 14th century)
- Johannes Ciconia (c. 1370 – 1412)
- Antonello da Caserta (late 14th – early 15th century)
- Matteo da Perugia (fl. 1400–1416)

== Renaissance ==
- Zacara da Teramo (c. 1350/1360 – c. 1413/1416)
- Paolo da Firenze (c. 1355 – c. 1436)
- Giovanni Mazzuoli (c. 1360 – 1426)
- Antonio da Cividale (fl. 1392–1421)
- Bartolomeo da Bologna (de Bononia) (fl. 1405–1427)
- Nicolaus Zacharie (c. 1400 – 1466)
- Johannes de Quadris (before 1410 – c. 1457)
- Franchinus Gaffurius (1451–1522)
- Marchetto Cara (c. 1465 – 1525)
- Giacomo Fogliano (1468–1548)
- Michele Pesenti (c. 1470 – after 1524)
- Bartolomeo Tromboncino (c. 1470 – c. 1535)
- Vincenzo Capirola (1474 – after 1548)
- Bartolomeo degli Organi (1474–1539)
- Filippo de Lurano (c. 1475–after 1520)
- Francesco Spinacino (late 15th century – after 1507)
- Costanzo Festa (c. 1485/1490 – 1545)
- Joan Ambrosio Dalza (fl. 1508)
- Gasparo Alberti (c. 1489 – c. 1560)
- Bernardo Pisano (1490–1548)
- Sebastiano Festa (c. 1490/1495 – 1524)
- Francesco de Layolle (dell'Aiolle) (1492 – c. 1540)
- Francesco da Milano (1497–1543)
- Matteo Rampollini (1497–1553)
- Francesco Corteccia (1502–1571)
- Alfonso dalla Viola (1508 – c. 1573)
- Vincenzo Ruffo (c. 1508 – 1587)
- Luigi Dentice (c. 1510 – 1566)
- Giovanni Domenico da Nola (c. 1510 – 1592)
- Claudio Veggio (born c. 1510)
- Domenico Ferrabosco (1513–1574)
- Nicolao Dorati (c. 1513 – 1593)
- Antonio Scandello (1517–1580)
- Gioseffo Zarlino (1517–1590)
- Francesco Cellavenia (fl. 1538–1563)
- Giovanni Animuccia (c. 1520 – 1571)
- Vincenzo Galilei (c. 1520 – 1591)
- Francesco Portinaro (c. 1520 – c. 1578)
- Hoste da Reggio (Bartolomeo Torresano) (c. 1520 – 1569)
- Giovanni Maria de Rossi (c. 1522–1590)
- Girolamo Parabosco (c. 1524 – 1577)
- Giovanni Pierluigi da Palestrina (c. 1525 – 1594)
- Baldassare Donato (1525/1530 – 1603)
- Ippolito Ciera (fl. 1546 – 1561)
- Annibale Padovano (1527–1575)
- Costanzo Porta (c. 1529 – 1601)
- Giorgio Mainerio (c. 1530/40 – 1582)
- Giammateo Asola (c. 1532 – 1609)
- Andrea Gabrieli (1532/1533 – 1595)
- Claudio Merulo (1533–1604)
- Lodovico Agostini (1534–1590)
- Innocentio Alberti (c. 1535 – 1615)
- Marc'Antonio Ingegneri (c. 1535 – 1592)
- Rocco Rodio (c. 1535 – after 1615)
- Annibale Stabile (c. 1535 – 1595)
- Pietro Taglia (fl. c. 1555 – 1565)
- Filippo Azzaiolo (fl. 1557 – 1569)
- Antonio Valente (fl. 1565 – 1580)
- Alessandro Striggio (c. 1536/1537 – 1592)
- Fabrizio Dentice (c. 1539 – c. 1581)
- Vincenzo Bellavere (c. 1540/1541 – 1587)
- Giovanni Ferretti (c. 1540 – after 1609)
- Stefano Rossetto (fl. 1560–1580)
- Francesco Rovigo (1540/1541 – 1597)
- Gioseppe Caimo (c. 1545 – 1584)
- Luzzasco Luzzaschi (c. 1545 – 1607)
- Giovanni Giacomo de Antiquis (d. 1608)
- Girolamo Dalla Casa (fl. from 1568; died 1601)
- Francesco Soriano (c. 1548 – 1621)
- Orazio Vecchi (1550–1605)
- Benedetto Pallavicino (c. 1551 – 1601)
- Luca Marenzio (c. 1553 – 1599)
- Paolo Bellasio (1554–1594)
- Girolamo Diruta (c. 1554 – after 1610)
- Giovanni Giacomo Gastoldi (c. 1554 – 1609)
- Carlo Gesualdo (1566–1613)

== Baroque ==
- Emilio de' Cavalieri (1550–1602)
- Giulio Caccini (1551–1618)
- Paolo Quagliati (c. 1555 – 1628)
- Giovanni Croce (1557–1609)
- Alfonso Fontanelli (1557–1622)
- Giovanni Gabrieli (1557–1612)
- Giovanni Bassano (c. 1558 – 1617)
- Felice Anerio (1560–1614)
- Giulio Belli (c. 1560 – 1621 or later)
- Giovanni Bernardino Nanino (c. 1560 – 1623)
- Lodovico Grossi da Viadana (c. 1560 – 1627)
- Jacopo Peri (1561–1633)
- Ascanio Mayone (c. 1565 – 1627)
- Alessandro Piccinini (1566–1638)
- Giovanni Francesco Anerio (c. 1567 – 1630)
- Claudio Monteverdi (1567–1643)
- Adriano Banchieri (1568–1634)
- Bartolomeo Barbarino (c. 1568 – 1617 or later)
- Giovanni Matteo Faà di Bruno (fl. 1570)
- Giovanni Paolo Cima (c. 1570 – 1622)
- Salamone Rossi (c. 1570 – 1630)
- Claudia Sessa (c. 1570 – c. 1617/1619)
- Giovanni Battista Fontana (c. 1571 – c. 1630)
- Giovanni Picchi (1571/1572–1643)
- Cesarina Ricci de Tingoli (born c. 1573, fl. 1597)
- Claudio Pari (1574–after 1619)
- Francesco Rasi (1574–1621)
- Vittoria Aleotti (c. 1575 – after 1620)
- Ignazio Donati (c. 1575 – 1638)
- Michelagnolo Galilei (1575–1631)
- Giovanni Priuli (c. 1575 – 1626)
- Giovanni Maria Trabaci (c. 1575 – 1647)
- Antonio Brunelli (1577–1630)
- Agostino Agazzari (1578–1640)
- Vincenzo Ugolini (c. 1580 – 1638)
- Gregorio Allegri (1582–1652)
- Severo Bonini (1582–1663)
- Marco da Gagliano (1582–1643)
- Sigismondo d'India (c. 1582 – 1629)
- Giovanni Valentini (c. 1582 – 1649)
- Paolo Agostino (c. 1583 – 1629)
- Girolamo Frescobaldi (1583–1643)
- Antonio Cifra (1584–1629)
- Giovanni Battista Rossi (fl. 1585 – c. 1628)
- Andrea Falconieri (1585/1586–1656)
- Alessandro Grandi (1586–1630)
- Stefano Landi (c. 1586 – 1639)
- Claudio Saracini (1586–1630)
- Francesca Caccini (1587 – c. 1640)
- Francesco Turini (1589–1656)
- Dario Castello (c. 1590 – c. 1658)
- Giovanni Martino Cesare (c. 1590 – 1667)
- Carlo Milanuzzi (c. 1590 – c. 1647)
- Domenico Mazzocchi (1592–1665)
- Antonio Ferraro (c. 1592 – after 1629)
- Francesco Manelli (1594–1667)
- Biagio Marini (1594–1663)
- Tarquinio Merula (1594/1595–1665)
- Antonio Maria Abbatini (c. 1595 – 1680)
- Giovanni Battista Buonamente (c. 1595 – 1642)
- Giovanni Rovetta (c. 1596 – 1668)
- Virgilio Mazzocchi (1597–1646)
- Luigi Rossi (c. 1597 – 1653)
- Giuseppe Galli (fl. 1598)
- Giovanni Battista Fasolo (c. 1598–c. 1664/1665)
- Giovanni Felice Sances (c. 1600 – 1679)
- Marco Scacchi (c. 1600 – 1681/1687)
- Michelangelo Rossi (c. 1601 – 1656)
- Francesco Cavalli (1602–1676)
- Marco Marazzoli (c. 1602 – 1662)
- Benedetto Ferrari (c. 1603 – 1681)
- Francesco Foggia (1603–1688)
- Giuseppe Allevi (1603 or 1604-1670)
- Marco Uccellini (1603/1610–1680)
- Orazio Benevoli (1605–1672)
- Antonio Bertali (1605–1669)
- Giacomo Carissimi (1605–1674)
- Francesco Sacrati (1605–1650)
- Giacinto Anzalone (1606–1656)
- Giovanni Antonio Rigatti (c. 1613 – 1648)
- Angelo Michele Bartolotti (c. 1615 – 1696)
- Francesco Corbetta (c. 1615 – 1681)
- Giovanni Bettini (fl. 1616 – c. 1624)
- Maurizio Cazzati (1616–1678)
- Giuseppe Olivieri (fl. 1617 – c. 1623)
- Barbara Strozzi (1619–1677)
- Isabella Leonarda (1620–1704)
- Antonio Cesti (1623–1669)
- Angelo Olivieri (c. 1636–1715)
- Bernardo Storace (1637–1707)
- Bernardo Pasquini (1637–1710)
- Jacopo Melani (1623–1676)
- Giovanni Antonio Pandolfi Mealli (1624–1687)
- Francesco Provenzale (1624–1704)
- Giovanni Maria Scorzuto (fl. 1625 – c. 1636)
- Giovanni Legrenzi (1626–1690)
- Giuseppe Scarani (fl. 1628 - fl. 1642)
- Lelio Colista (1629–1680)
- Carlo Pallavicino (c. 1630 – 1688)
- Giuseppe Caruso (fl. 1634)
- Giovanni Paolo Colonna (1637–1695)
- Giovanni Buonaventura Viviani (1638 – c. 1693)
- Alessandro Melani (1639–1703)
- Alessandro Stradella (1639–1682)
- Cristoforo Caresana (c. 1640 – 1709)
- Paolo Lorenzani (1640–1713)
- Giovanni Maria Bononcini (1642–1678)
- Michelangelo Falvetti (1642–1692)
- Ignazio Albertini (1644–1685)
- Cataldo Amodei (c. 1650 – c. 1695)
- Giovanni Battista Bassani (c. 1650 – 1716)
- Petronio Franceschini (1651–1680)
- Domenico Gabrielli (1651–1690)
- Arcangelo Corelli (1653–1713)
- Carlo Francesco Pollarolo (c. 1653 – 1723)
- Agostino Steffani (1653–1728)
- Marc'Antonio Ziani (c. 1653 – 1715)
- Pietro Antonio Fiocco (1654–1714)
- Giuseppe Ottavio Pitoni (1657–1743)
- Giuseppe Torelli (1658–1709)
- Francesco Antonio Pistocchi (1659–1726)
- Antonio Veracini (1659–1745)
- Rosa Giacinta Badalla (c. 1660 – c. 1710)
- Giovanni Bianchi (c. 1660 – after 1720)
- Alessandro Scarlatti (1660–1725)
- Ignazio Pollice (fl. 1684–1705)
- Francesco Gasparini (1661–1727)
- Giacomo Antonio Perti (1661–1756)
- Pirro Capacelli Albergati (1663–1735)
- Tomaso Antonio Vitali (1663–1745)
- Filippo Amadei (c. 1665 – c. 1725)
- Giovanni Maria Ruggieri (c. 1665 – c. 1725)
- Attilio Ariosti (1666–1729)
- Francesco Scarlatti (1666 – c. 1741)
- Antonio Lotti (c. 1667 – 1740)
- Alessandro Marcello (1669–1747)
- Giuseppe Avitrano (c. 1670 – 1756)
- Giovanni Bononcini (1670–1747)
- Antonio Caldara (1670–1736)
- Tomaso Albinoni (1671–1751)
- Giuseppe Aldrovandini (1671–1707)
- Azzolino della Ciaja (1671–1755)
- Teodorico Pedrini (1671–1746)
- Carlo Agostino Badia (1672–1738)
- Francesco Antonio Bonporti (1672–1749)
- Francesco Mancini (1672–1737)
- Evaristo Felice Dall'Abaco (1675–1742)
- Giovanni Porta (c. 1675 – 1755)
- Giuseppe Maria Orlandini (1676–1760)
- Antonio Maria Bononcini (1677–1726)
- Francesco Nicola Fago (1677–1745)
- Antonio Vivaldi (1678–1741)
- Pietro Filippo Scarlatti (1679–1750)
- Emanuele d'Astorga (1681–1736)
- Francesco Bartolomeo Conti (1681–1732)
- Giuseppe Valentini (1681–1753)
- Francesco Manfredini (1684–1762)
- Giuseppe Matteo Alberti (1685–1751)
- Lodovico Giustini (1685–1743)
- Domenico Scarlatti (1685–1757)
- Benedetto Marcello (1686–1739)
- Nicola Porpora (1686–1768)
- Giovanni Battista Somis (1686–1763)
- Francesco Geminiani (1687–1762)
- Domenico Zipoli (1688–1726)
- Pietro Baldassare (before 1690 – after 1768)
- Giovanni Antonio Giai (Giay, Giaj) (1690–1764)
- Antonio Vandini (1690–1778)
- Francesco Maria Veracini (1690–1768)
- Leonardo Vinci (c. 1690 – 1730)
- Francesco Feo (1691–1761)
- Geminiano Giacomelli (1692–1740)
- Giovanni Alberto Ristori (1692–1753)
- Giuseppe Tartini (1692–1770)
- Pietro Locatelli (1695–1764)
- Giuseppe Sammartini (1695–1750)
- Alphonsus Maria de' Liguori (1696–1787)
- Pietro Auletta (c. 1698 – 1771)
- Giovanni Giorgi (fl. from 1719; d. 1762)
- Giovanni Zamboni (fl. early 18th century)
- Matteo Zocarini (fl. 1740)
- Giovanni Battista Pergolesi (1710–1736)

== Classical era ==
- Giovanni Battista Sammartini (c. 1700 – 1775)
- Alessandro Besozzi (1702–1775)
- Andrea Bernasconi (c. 1706 – 1784)
- Baldassare Galuppi (1706–1785)
- Giovanni Battista Martini (Padre Martini) (1706–1784)
- Antonio Pampani (1706–1775)
- Domenico Alberti (c. 1710 – 1740)
- Giuseppe Bonno (1711–1788)
- Niccolò Jommelli (1714–1774)
- Pasquale Cafaro (1715/1716–1787)
- Nicola Conforto (1718–1793)
- Giuseppe Scarlatti (1718/1723–1777)
- Girolamo Donnini (fl. 1719 - died 1752)
- Carlo Antonio Campioni (1720–1788)
- Gioacchino Cocchi (1720–1804)
- Quirino Gasparini (1721–1778)
- Pietro Nardini (1722–1793)
- Giovanni Marco Rutini (1723–1797)
- Francesco Uttini (1723–1795)
- Giovanni Battista Cirri (1724–1724)
- Domenico Fischietti (c. 1725 – c. 1810)
- Antonio Lolli (1725–1802)
- Pasquale Anfossi (1727–1797)
- Tommaso Traetta (1727–1779)
- Niccolò Piccinni (1728–1800)
- Giuseppe Sarti (1729–1802)
- Domenico Gallo (1730 – c. 1768)
- Pasquale Errichelli (1730–1785)
- Antonio Sacchini (1730–1786)
- Gaetano Pugnani (1731–1798)
- Giuseppe Colla (1731–1806)
- Giuseppe Demachi (1732 – c. 1791)
- Gian Francesco de Majo ("Ciccio") (1732–1770)
- Giacomo Tritto (1733–1824)
- Antonio Tozzi (1736–1812)
- Tommaso Giordani (c. 1738 – 1806)
- Anna Bon (di Venezia) (c. 1739 – after 1767)
- Giovannini (composer) (fl. 1740 – c. 1782)
- Luigi Gatti (1740–1817)
- Giovanni Paisiello (1740–1816)
- Andrea Luchesi (1741–1801)
- Luigi Tomasini (1741–1808)
- Jean Paul Egide Martini (1741–1816)
- Luigi Boccherini (1743–1805)
- Carlo Franchi (c. 1743 – after 1779)
- Giuseppe Gazzaniga (1743–1818)
- Gaetano Brunetti (1744–1798)
- Giuseppe Cambini (1746 – c. 1825)
- Domenico Cimarosa (1749–1801)
- Antonio Salieri (1750–1825)
- Bartolomeo Campagnoli (1751–1827)
- Giuseppe Giordani (Giordanello) (1751–1798)
- Francesco Bianchi (1752–1810)
- Muzio Clementi (1752–1832)
- Niccolò Antonio Zingarelli (1752–1837)
- Giuseppe Antonio Capuzzi (1755–1818)
- Giovanni Viotti (1755–1824)
- Vincenzo Righini (1756–1812)
- Alessandro Rolla (1757–1841)
- Giuseppe Bertini (1759–1852)
- Luigi Cherubini (1760–1842)
- Angelo Tarchi (1760–1814)
- Domenico Dragonetti (1763–1846)
- Filippo Gragnani (1768–1820)
- Giuseppe Farinelli (1769–1836)
- Giovanni Battista Bianchi (flourished 1780–1782)

== Romantic ==
- Ferdinando Carulli (1770–1841)
- Gaspare Spontini (1774–1851)
- Mauro Giuliani (1781–1829)
- Carlo Coccia (1782–1873)
- Niccolò Paganini (1782–1840)
- Francesco Morlacchi (1784–1841)
- Pietro Raimondi (1786–1853)
- Luigi Legnani (1790–1877)
- Nicola Vaccai (1790–1848)
- Padre Davide da Bergamo (Felice Moretti) (1791–1863)
- Carlo Evasio Soliva (1791–1853)
- Gioacchino Rossini (1792–1868)
- Saverio Mercadante (1795–1870)
- Giovanni Pacini (1796–1867)
- Gaetano Donizetti (1797–1848)
- Antonio Rolla (1798–1837)
- Raimondo Boucheron (1800–1876)
- Vincenzo Bellini (1801–1835)
- Giuseppe Concone (1801–1861)
- Cesare Pugni (1802–1870)
- Alessandro Nini (1805–1880)
- Giuseppe Mazza (1806–1885)
- Gaetano Gaspari (1807/1808–1881)
- Federico Ricci (1809–1877)
- Lauro Rossi (1810–1885)
- Errico Petrella (1813–1877)
- Giuseppe Verdi (1813–1901)
- Giuseppe Lillo (1814–1863)
- Antonio Buzzolla (1815–1871)
- Temistocle Solera (1815–1878)
- Teodulo Mabellini (1817–1897)
- Carlo Pedrotti (1817–1893)
- Antonio Bazzini (1818–1897)
- Giulio Briccialdi (1818–1881)
- Cesare Ciardi (1818–1877)
- Giovanni Bottesini (1821–1889)
- Giuseppe Apolloni (1822–1889)
- Luigi Arditi (1822–1903)
- Carlo Alfredo Piatti (1822–1901)
- Giulio Regondi (1822–1872)
- Adolfo Fumagalli (1828–1856)
- Antonio Cagnoni (1828–1896)
- Pietro Platania (1828–1907)
- Giovanni Rossi (1828–1886)
- Gaetano Braga (1829–1907)
- Filippo Marchetti (1831–1902)
- Giuseppe Gariboldi (1833–1905)
- Amilcare Ponchielli (1834–1886)
- Giovanni Bolzoni (1841–1919)
- Arrigo Boito (1842–1918)
- Giovanni Sgambati (1843–1914)
- Luigi Denza (1846–1922)
- Paolo Tosti (1846–1916)
- Riccardo Drigo (1846–1930)
- Ernesto Köhler (1849–1907)
- Antonio Scontrino (1850–1922)
- Alfredo Catalani (1854–1893)
- Vincenzo Valente (1855–1921)
- Giuseppe Martucci (1856–1909)
- Achille Simonetti (1857–1928)
- Ruggero Leoncavallo (1858–1919)
- Giacomo Puccini (1858–1924)
- Pietro Floridia (1860–1932)
- Alberto Franchetti (1860–1942)

== Modern/Contemporary ==
- Marco Enrico Bossi (1861–1925)
- Pietro Mascagni (1863–1945)
- Franco Leoni (1864–1949)
- Alessandro Longo (1864–1945)
- Ferruccio Busoni (1866–1924)
- Francesco Cilea (1866–1950)
- Umberto Giordano (1867–1948)
- Vittorio Monti (1868–1922)
- Leone Sinigaglia (1868–1944)
- Lorenzo Perosi (1872–1956)
- Franco Alfano (1875–1954)
- Guido Alberto Fano (1875–1961)
- Italo Montemezzi (1875–1952)
- Ermanno Wolf-Ferrari (1876–1948)
- Stefano Donaudy (1879–1925)
- Ottorino Respighi (1879–1936)
- Ildebrando Pizzetti (1880–1968)
- Gian Francesco Malipiero (1882–1973)
- Alfredo Casella (1883–1947)
- Luigi Russolo (1883–1947)
- Riccardo Zandonai (1883–1944)
- Franco Vittadini (1884–1948)
- Adriano Lualdi (1885–1971)
- Carlo Giorgio Garofalo (1886–1962)
- Pietro Yon (1886–1943)
- Giulia Recli (1890–1970)
- Giorgio Federico Ghedini (1892–1965)
- Victor de Sabata (1892-1967)
- Elsa Respighi (née Olivieri-Sangiacomo) (1894–1996)
- Mario Castelnuovo-Tedesco (1895–1968)
- Aldo Finzi (1897–1945)
- Vittorio Rieti (1898–1994)
- Mario Pilati (1903–1938)
- Luigi Dallapiccola (1904–1975)
- Goffredo Petrassi (1904–2003)
- Giacinto Scelsi (1905–1988)
- Giulio Cesare Brero (1908-1973)
- Franco Margola (1908–1992)
- Gian Carlo Menotti (1911–2007)
- Nino Rota (1911–1979)
- Giulio Viozzi (1912–1984)
- Riccardo Malipiero (1914–2003)
- Roman Vlad (1919–2013)
- Bruno Maderna (1920–1973)
- Camillo Togni (1922–1993)
- Flavio Testi (1923–2014)
- Franco Mannino (1924–2005)
- Luigi Nono (1924–1990)
- Luciano Berio (1925–2003)
- Aldo Clementi (1925–2011)
- Franco Evangelisti (1926–1980)
- Franco Donatoni (1927–2000)
- Ennio Morricone (1928–2020)
- Antonio Braga (1929–2009)
- Sylvano Bussotti (1931–2021)
- Niccolò Castiglioni (1932–1996)
- Giacomo Manzoni (born 1932)
- Azio Corghi (1937–2022)
- Gian Paolo Chiti (born 1939)
- Salvatore Sciarrino (born 1947)
- Daniele Zanettovich (born 1950)
- Lorenzo Ferrero (born 1951)
- Giorgio Battistelli (born 1953)
- Elisabetta Brusa (born 1954)
- Marco Tutino (born 1954)
- Ludovico Einaudi (born 1955)
- Carlo Pedini (born 1956)
- Piero Niro (born 1957)
- Giulio Castagnoli (born 1958)
- Marco Stroppa (born 1959)
- Fausto Romitelli (1963–2004)
- Federico Maria Sardelli (born 1963)
- Marco Ambrosini (born 1964)
- Marco Betta (born 1964)
- Roberto Carnevale (born 1966)
- Paolo Longo (born 1967)
- Salvatore Di Vittorio (born 1967)
- Giovanni Allevi (born 1969)
- Carlo Forlivesi (born 1971)
