= Ghirlanda sacra =

Ghirlanda sacra scielta da diversi eccellentissimi compositori de varii motetti à voce sola (Venice, 1625) is a compilation of 44 single-voice motets in the new style assembled by Leonardo Simonetti. Simonetti was a chorister in the Cappella Marciana, and placed his master Claudio Monteverdi at the head of the collection with four pieces, following it with other composers from the area of Venice and Veneto. A second printing followed in 1636.

== Composers ==
The compositions in the 1625 publication, in order, are by: Claudio Monteverdi Maestro di Cappella della Serenissima Signoria di Venezia (4 pieces), Giovanni Priuli Maestro di Capella di S. M. C. (2 pieces), Giovanni Rovetta, Alessandro Grandi (4 pieces), Giovanni Pietro Berti organist of Saint Mark's in Venice, Giovanni Paolo Capriolo Abbate in Candiana (2 pieces), Giacomo Finetti Maestro di Cappella nella gran Casa di Venezia, Dario Castello (2), Francesco Usper (2), Guido Rovetto Arciprete di S. Angelo, Giovanni Picchi, Gasparo Locatello Canonico di S. Marco, Amadio Freddi Maestro di Cappella del Duomo di Treviso (2), Giovanni Pozzo, Bartolomeo Barbarino detto il Pesarino (2 pieces), Domenico Obizzi, Giacomo Finetti, Giovanni Massiccio, Giacomo Arigoni (3 pieces), Carlo Milanuzzi organist at Saint Stephen's Venice, G.M. Sabino Napolitano (4 pieces), Giulio Cesare Martinengo, Pietro Francesco Caletto Bruni Organista di S. Gio. e Paolo di Venezia, Giovanni Maria Scorzuto Maestro di Capella ed Organista della M. Comunità di Asola Trevigiana (1 piece), Leandro Gallerano, Giacinto Bondioli Prior di S. Domenico in Venezia, Padre Andrea Stella (2 pieces).

== Recordings ==
- Ghirlanda Sacra: Il Mottetto a voce sola a Venezia Arte Musica conducted by Francesco Cera 2006 Tactus
- Ghirlanda Sacra: complete recording 3CD ensemble Primi Toni Nicola Lamon, conductor 2013 Tactus
