= Giovanni Bianchi =

Giovanni Bianchi may refer to:

- Giovanni Bianchi (composer, born c. 1660), Italian composer and violinist of the Baroque era
- Giovanni Bianchi (physician) (1693–1775), Italian physician, anatomist, archaeologist, zoologist and intellectual
- Giovanni Bianchi (politician) (1939–2017), Italian politician and teacher
- Giovanni Antonio Bianchi (1686–1768), Italian friar, theologian, and poet
- Giovanni Battista Bianchi (composer, flourished 1675), Italian Augustinian monk, composer, and organist
- Giovanni Battista Bianchi (composer, flourished 1780–1782), Italian composer
