= 1573 in music =

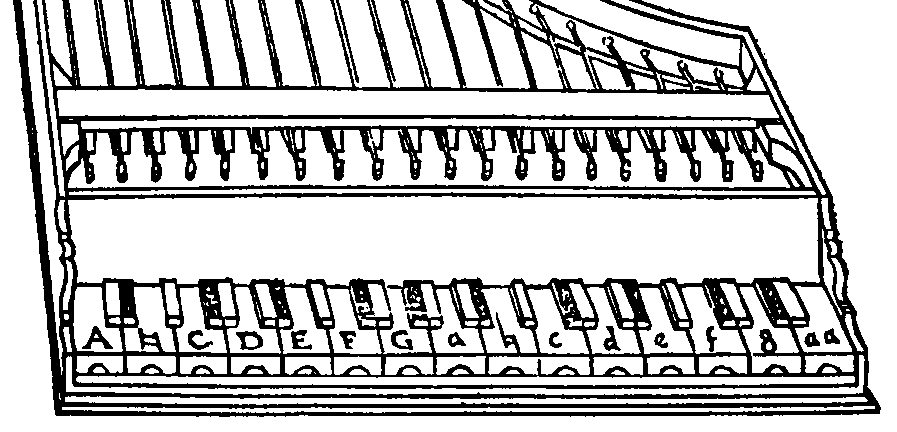
An illustration of a harpsichord keyboard with 19 keys in one octave from Gioseffo Zarlino's Le institutione harmoniche (1573)

== Events ==
- Approximate formation date of the Florentine Camerata, at the salon of Count Giovanni de' Bardi (earliest record is January 14, 1573).
- Manuel Rodrigues Coelho becomes organist of Badajoz Cathedral.

== Publications ==
- Giammateo Asola – Completorium per totum annum quatuorque illae Beatae Virginis antiphonae quae in fine pro anni tempore secundum Romanam curiam decantatur for six voices (Venice: Girolamo Scotto)
- Joachim a Burck – Sacrae cantiones plane novae (Entirely new sacred songs) for six voices (Nuremberg: Dietrich Gerlach)
- Ippolito Chamaterò – Psalms for eight voices (Venice: Girolamo Scotto)
- Giovanni Matteo Faà di Bruno – Salmi di David profeta con tre Magnificat for five, six, and eight voices (Venice: Antonio Gardano, sons)
- Giovanni Ferretti – First book of canzoni alla napolitana for six voices (Venice: Girolamo Scotto)
- Marc'Antonio Ingegneri – First book of masses for five and eight voices (Venice: Antonio Gardano, figliuoli)
- Paolo Isnardi – Masses for four voices (Venice: Antonio Gardano, figliuoli)
- Jacobus de Kerle
  - Liber modulorum sacrorum for four, five, and six voices (Munich: Adam Berg)
  - Book of motets for four and five voices (Munich: Adam Berg), also includes a Te Deum for six voices
- Orlande de Lassus
  - Patrocinium musices, part 1 (Munich: Adam Berg), a collection of motets
  - Moduli for six, seven, and twelve voices (Paris: Le Roy & Ballard)
  - Viersprachendruck for four voices (Munich: Adam Berg), containing six pieces each in Latin, German, French, and Italian
- Claudio Merulo – First book of masses for five voices (Venice: sons of Antonio Gardano)
- Philippe de Monte – Second book of motets for five voices (Venice: Girolamo Scotto)
- Annibale Padovano – First book of masses for five voices (Venice: sons of Antonio Gardano)
- Giovanni Pierluigi da Palestrina – Third book of motets for five, six, and eight voices (Venice: Girolamo Scotto)
- Leonhard Päminger – two collections of motets published posthumously in Nuremberg by his sons
- Costanzo Porta – Third book of madrigals for five voices (Venice: sons of Antonio Gardano)
- Cipriano de Rore – Sacrae cantiones (pub. by Petrus Phalesius the Elder)

== Births ==
- January 31
  - Ambrosius Metzger, German composer and Meistersinger
  - Giulio Cesare Monteverdi (baptized), Italian composer, younger brother of Claudio Monteverdi (d. 1630-31).
- February 22 – Gemignano Capilupi, Italian composer
- July 19 (baptized) – Inigo Jones, English stage designer and architect (d. 1652)
- date unknown
  - Francesco Colombini, Italian composer and organist
  - Benedikt Faber, German composer
  - Juan de Palomares, Spanish composer and guitarist
  - Alessandro Striggio the younger, Italian composer (d. 1630).
- probable – Géry de Ghersem, Flemish composer and singer (d. 1630)
  - Cesarina Ricci de Tingoli, Italian composer.

== Deaths ==
- March 15 (or earlier) – Christopher Tye, English composer (b. c. 1505)
- November 17 – Joannes Pionnier, French composer
- December 7 – John Thorne, English composer and poet
- December 27 – December 31 – Firmin Lebel, French chorus director and composer
- date unknown
  - Johannes Claux, Flemish composer
  - Melchior Kreisstein, German music printer
  - Gislain Manilius, Flemish music printer
  - Petrus Phalesius the Elder, Flemish music publisher
- probable – Alfonso dalla Viola, Italian composer and instrumentalist
