= Dalla Viola =

Dalla Viola (also Della Viola, De la Viola, and Viola) was an Italian family of musicians, active from about 1470 to 1570. The most prominent members were:

- Alfonso dalla Viola (c. 1508 – c. 1573), composer and instrumentalist
- Francesco dalla Viola (d. 1568), choirmaster and composer
