= Giuseppe Caruso =

Giuseppe Caruso may refer to:

- Giuseppe Caruso (brigand) (1820–1892), Italian brigand
- Giuseppe Caruso (composer) (fl. 1634), Italian composer and organist of the Baroque period
- Pino Caruso (1934–2019), Italian actor, author and TV-personality
- Pippo Caruso (1935–2018), Italian composer, conductor and music arranger
