= Op. 91 =

In music, Op. 91 stands for Opus number 91. Compositions that are assigned this number include:

- Beethoven – Wellington's Victory
- Brahms – Two Songs for Voice, Viola and Piano
- Britten – Sacred and Profane
- Delius – Two Songs to be sung of a summer night on the water
- Dvořák – In Nature's Realm
- Glière – Horn Concerto
- Margola – Cello Concerto
- Schumann – Romanzen volume II (6 partsongs for women's voices)
- Sibelius – Jäger March (Jääkärimarssi), military march for male choir and orchestra (1917)
