= Francesco Sabino =

Italian composer

Francesco Sabino (born Naples, c. 1620) was an Italian composer. He was a nephew of brothers Giovan Maria Sabino and Donato Antonio Sabino.
