= Paolo Isnardi =

Italian composer

- Born: 1536
- Died: 5 May 1596; Ferrara
- Occupation(s): choirmaster, composer
- Spouse: Lucrezia Pocaterra

Paolo Isnardi (c. 1536 - 5 May 1596) was a late-Renaissance choirmaster and composer.

== Biography ==
Isnardi was musically educated by Francesco Manara at the Ferrara Cathedral. Although he spent most of his life residing in Ferrara, he spent some time at both Venice and Mantua between the years 1560 and 1570. He was married to the sister of poet Annibale Pocaterra, Lucrezia. He most likely received some patronage from Guglielmo Gonzaga. It was in 1560 that his first published work, Primo libro di madrigali, was printed. On the recommendation of Luigi d'Este, another patron, he was appointed successor to the recently deceased Francesco dalla Viola as maestro di capella at the Ferrara Cathedral, although he likely did not take up this post until 1573. 1572 saw the publication of what is probably his best-known work, Lamentations Hieremiae prophetae. The following year he published a volume entitled Missae quatuor vocum. In addition to his duties at the cathedral, he also was active at the Duke's court of Ferrara as musical head. Because his music was classified as nonconformist, he was forbidden to perform his music at the Ferrara Cathedral unless he had explicit permission of the local see chapter. This kerfuffle does not seem to have affected his employment, nor the further publications of his works, as Il lauro secco was published in 1582, Il lauro verde in 1583, another set of lamentations, Lamentationes et benedictus, in 1584, and Giardino de musici ferraresi in 1591. He remained chapel maestro at Ferrara until his death in 1596.

== Style ==
Isnardi wrote several lamentations, madrigals, masses, and psalms. These were published between 1561 and 1598. His main musical technique is that of parody, although this technique is notably absent from his Mass for two choirs. He has been credited with being among the first to use Tridentine form for the Dies Irae portion of his requiems.
