= Cello Concerto (Margola) =

Work by Franco Margola

The Cello Concerto, Op. 91 composed by Franco Margola is one of his most important works. Dedicated to the Spanish cellist Gaspar Cassadó (Barcelona, 1897 – Madrid, 1966) the concerto "came to exist in three different versions from which Margola drew the material for the definitive final version in 1949, having also benefited from the advice of the dedicatee Cassadó".

It consists of three movements:

1. Allegro vivo, Adagio, Allegro, Adagio, Allegro
2. Calmo
3. Allegro, Tempo di Siciliana, Allegro

The concerto is scored for solo cello as well as 2 flutes, 2 oboes, 2 clarinets in C, 2 bassoons, 3 horns in F, 3 trumpets in C, piano, timpani, and strings.

== Recordings ==
- Orazio Fiume (Ouverture for Orchestra), Franco Margola (Violoncello Concerto Op. 91) & Ottorino Respighi (Adagio con variazioni for violoncello and orchestra). Orchestra della Fondazione "Teatro Verdi" (Trieste), cello Jacopo Francini, conductor Paolo Longo. CD Rainbow Classical, Cat.No. RW20100906
