= Nicola Lamon =

Italian harpsichordist and conductor

Nicola Lamon (born 1979) is an Italian harpsichordist and organist. He studied with Sergio Vartolo and Marco Vincenzi in Venice.

== Discography ==
- Ghirlanda sacra complete, 3CDs recorded 2011, released Tactus 2013
