= Giovanni Paolo Caprioli =

Italian priest and composer

Giovanni Paolo Caprioli (c. 1580 – c. 1627) was an Italian priest, abbate in Candiana, and composer.

== Life and career ==
Caprioli was born in Brescia in 1571 ca. and died January 1630 in the convent of St. John the Evangelist during the plague. The noble family from Brescia Caprioli is attested in documents citizens since the eleventh century. Gentlemen from the time of Henry III of the lands of Capriolo (BS), moved into town in the early fourteenth century living in different buildings but particularly in the palace Caprioli Via Elia Capriolo. The family was the birthplace of two important musicians: Alfonso Antonio Caprioli (sec. XV - composer of lies and strambotti) and John Paul that in 1587 he entered the convent of Scandiano (PD) belongs to the Congregation of the Rhenish Lateran Canons of SS. Savior of Bologna. In this religious order the severity and austerity of monastic life married with a keen sensitivity to the artistic decoration of the churches and a special interest in a cultural qualification through the study. Figures of great composers and organists will require a bit 'anywhere in the various convents of the Congregation, especially in Bologna, Mantua, Venice and Brescia, where, in the rectory of St. John is the strong influence of traditional instrumental and vocal production environment Brescia Renaissance and Baroque. Among the major players operating in the convent Brescia remember Floriano Channels, Angelo Maria from Peschiera, Leone from Bologna, Dionysius from Fano, Peter Knights, Giovanni Artusi, Pietro Andrea Ziani, Carlo Maffei and not least John Paul Caprioli which we can thank the studies of Oscar Mischiati retrace his monastic pilgrimage:

- 1587-1593 Candiana - 1594 Venice - Treviso from 1595 to 1598 - 1599 Piacenza - Bologna from 1600 to 1602 - 1603 Ravenna - 1604-1606 Candiana - 1607 Venice - Abano 1608-1609 - 1610-1621 Modena - Brescia 1622 - Modena 1623 - 1624 -1627 Candiana and abbot in Cento - 1628-1630 Brescia

Among the compositions of Caprioli mention the Sonatas artificial, small but varied work that includes songs undoubtedly influenced by the beautiful works of Vecchi, motets for solo voice and as a duo in a popular language concerted, duets and chamber sonatas for an instrument high, one low and basso continuo and Sacrae Cantiones, where the motets for solo voice, with effects of echo organ, the vocal part is made florid and expressive through rapid sprints virtuosic. But some of the best compositions are in the duets of the same volume, where, at times, a painful lack of melodic invention is compensated by the excellent triple counterpoint between the voices and the constant in a declamatory style that anticipates the duets of Monteverdi on the same text.

Works: - Canzonette a tre voci, libro I, Venezia, Giacomo Vincenti, 1602 - Sacrae Cantiones Vna, Duabusque vocibus concinendae, Modena, Giuliano Cassiani, 1618 - Dolcissimi frutti spirituali...da cantarsi à Doi Voci con il Basso continuo, Venezia, Gardano, 1625 - Sonate artificiose a doi voce di Canto e Basso, Venezia, Gardano, 1625 o 1627 (ed. destroyed in World War II); Venezia, Gardano, 1638 - 5 mottetti in Symbolae diversorum musicorum binis, trinis, quaternis et quinis vocibus cantandae...Ad Admodum D. Laurentio Calvo..., Venezia, Alessandro Vincenti, 1620 - 1 litania, in Rosarium Litaniarum B.V.M., Venezia, Alessandro Vincenti, 1626 - 2 composizioni, in Ghirlanda sacra scielta...a voce sola, libro I, op. II, Venezia, Gardano, 1625 e rist. 1636 Bibliografia: - G. Bignami, Enciclopedia dei musicisti bresciani, Brescia, 1985 - O. Mischiati, La prassi, cit., pp. 24, 25, 74, 121 - O. Mischiati, Bibliografia delle opere dei musicisti bresciani..., Firenze, Leo S. Olschki, 1992 - Francesco Passadore, Le antologie lombarde a voce sola di C.F.Vigoni, in Tradizione e stile, A.M.I.S., Como 1989, p. 227n - O. Mischiati, La prassi musicale presso i Canonici Regolari del SS. Salvatore…, Roma, Torre d’Orfeo, 1985 - J. Roche: North Italian Church Music in the Age of Monteverdi, Oxford, 1984 - J. Roche in New Grove ad vocem

His Vulnerasti cor meum has been performed and recorded by Philippe Jaroussky. Two other solo motets - In lectulo per noctes and Congratulamini mihi omnes - appear in Ghirlanda sacra 1625.
