= Giovanni Maria Sabino =

Italian composer

Giovanni Maria Sabino (30 June 1588 – April 1649) was an Italian composer, organist and teacher.

Sabino was born in Turi, into a family of musicians and composers. He was the brother of Antonio Sabino and uncle of Francesco Sabino. At the age of 14 he went to Naples to study music under Prospero Testa. From 1610-1613 he returned to Turi, taking holy orders. In 1622 he was appointed a teacher at the Conservatorio della Pietà dei Turchini, a position he held until 1626. In 1627 he became maestro de capella at Castel Nuovo, and between 1630 and 1634 was organist at Oratorio di San Filippo, then maestro di cappella at the Santa Casa dell'Annunziata. He died in Naples.

Sabino was the first Neapolitan composer to employ violins in motets. He was the teacher of Gregorio Strozzi, and precursor of Giovanni Salvatore and Francesco Provenzale. He was also the only Southern Italian composer to feature alongside Monteverdi, with 4 motets in Simonetti's publication Ghirlanda Sacra (Venice 1625). Sabino also promoted Monteverdi in Naples, including Monteverdi's Confitebor with his own psalm printing in 1627.

== Works ==
- Psalms for Compline for 4 voices
- The first book of motets for 2 voices
- The second book of motets for 2-4 voices
- Psalms for Vespers for 4 voices
- 4 motets for voice and basso continuo
- Psalms for 5 voices
- 3 motets for 3-4 voices
- Motet with symphony for 3 voices, 2 violins and continuo
- Motet for 2-3 items continuo
- Galiardo for 4 violas
- 1 cantata for voice and continuo
- Dixit Dominus for 5 voices
- Other motets

== Recordings ==
- 6 solo motets on Lo Monteverde Voltato a lo Napolitano. Musici delle Cappelle di Napoli al tempo di Monteverdi (also includes pieces by Sabino's brother and nephew) Cappella della Pietà de' Turchini dir. Florio. Symphonia 93S19
