= Antonio Sabino =

Italian composer and priest

Donato Antonio «Antonino» Sabino (Turi, 13 February 1591 - Naples, 1650) was an Italian composer and priest. He was brother of Giovan Maria Sabino, another composer-priest, and uncle of Francesco Sabino.
