= Giovanni Massiccio =

Italian composer

Giovanni Massiccio (fl. 1620s) was an Italian composer who featured in Ghirlanda sacra, 1625.
