= Giovanni Pozzo =

Italian composer

Giovanni Pozzo (fl. 1620s) was an Italian composer. A solo motet by Pozzo, Veni sancte spiritus was included in Ghirlanda sacra, 1625.
