= Giovanni Picchi =

Italian composer

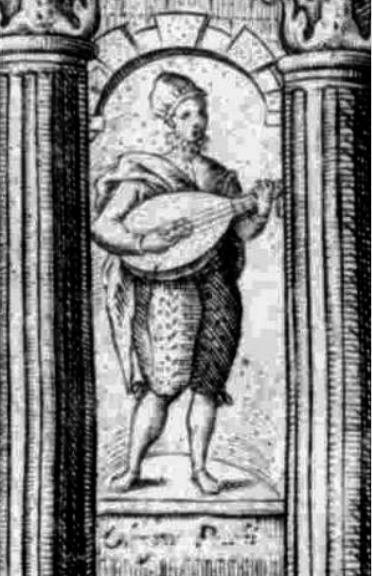
Picchi Nobiltà di Dame.png

Giovanni Picchi (1571 or 1572 – 17 May 1643) was an Italian composer, organist, lutenist, and harpsichordist of the early Baroque era. He was a late follower of the Venetian School, and was influential in the development and differentiation of instrumental forms which were just beginning to appear, such as the sonata and the ensemble canzona; in addition he was the only Venetian of his time to write dance music for harpsichord.

== Life ==
Little is known about Picchi's early life, but his birthdate (1571 or 1572) can be inferred from his death record which states that he was 71 when he died on 17 May 1643. The earliest documentary evidence pertaining to him, unusually enough, is a picture: he appears as a lutenist on the title page of a 1600 dance manual by Fabritio Caroso (Nobilità di dame). Sometime before February 1607 he was hired as organist at the Venetian church of the Frari, and from 1623 to his death he was also organist at the confraternity Scuola di San Rocco, the most prestigious and wealthy of all the Venetian confraternities. In 1624 he applied for the position of second organist at St. Mark's, but Giovanni Pietro Berti was chosen instead.

He was a close contemporary of Monteverdi, being born four years later and dying six months earlier than the more renowned composer.

== Music and influence ==
Of Picchi's music, mostly instrumental music survives. One harpsichord toccata is included in the Fitzwilliam Virginal Book (how it got there is not known – very little Italian music is included in that English collection); three passamezzos survive in a manuscript from Turin; and in 1619 he published a collection of harpsichord dances, Intavolatura di balli d'arpicordo. In addition, he published a collection of 19 ensemble canzonas in 1625, Canzoni da sonar. A sole motet survives in Ghirlanda sacra 1625.

His harpsichord dances are of three types: dances in triple meter, dances in triple meter paired with saltarellos, and pieces which use a ground bass. Most of the works with ground bass use some type of romanesca pattern, consisting of a line descending by fourth, rising by step, then descending again by fourth or fifth, rising by step, and so forth (the Pachelbel Canon, probably written several decades after Picchi's death, is probably the most famous example of variations over a romanesca bass).

Within his ensemble canzonas, Picchi worked to differentiate several types of instrumental writing which were critically important to later forms such as the concerto. In particular, he used well-defined concertino, ritornello, and cadenzas in his ensemble music, following and further developing a practice initiated in the music of Giovanni Gabrieli and the other composers of his generation. His writing for concertino groups was probably the most innovative aspect of his style, and foreshadowed the work of composers in the middle Baroque such as Corelli. Picchi used both sequential variation and echo effects, and scored for a variety of instruments including violins, bassoons, recorders and trombones, often in the same piece.

Picchi seems to have used the terms canzona and sonata interchangeably, sometimes calling a piece "canzona" in the score and "sonata" in the part book; the differentiation of these forms was only just beginning in the early 17th century.

== Media ==
Polish and Hungarian Dance
Performed by Sylvia Kind on a harpsichord of the type made in the early 20th century
