= Gaetano Brunetti =

Italian composer

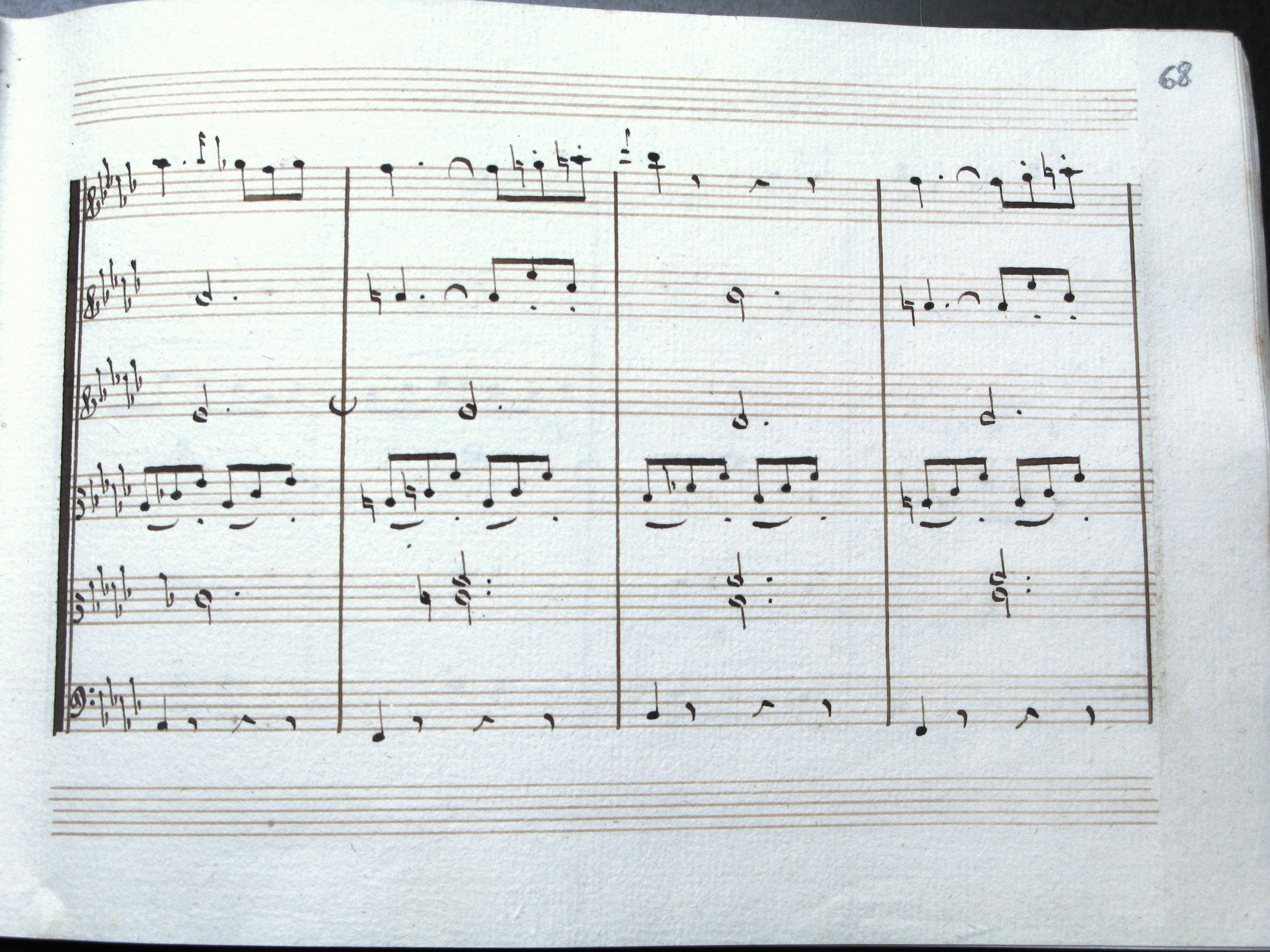
Score of Brunetti's oboe sextet no. 1 of 1796 (Spanish copy c.1800, Biblioteca Palatina, Parma). Like many of his compositions, Brunetti's six late oboe sextets were written for the private entertainment of King Charles IV of Spain and were not eligible for publication during his lifetime.

Gaetano (or Cayetano) Brunetti (1744 in Fano, Papal States – 16 December 1798, Colmenar de Oreja, Madrid, Spain) was an Italian-born composer who was active in Spain during the reigns of kings Charles III and Charles IV. As well as being musically influential at court, Brunetti was a key contributor to the modernization of Spanish musical culture in the late 18th century.

== Life and career ==
As a boy, he appears to have studied the violin in Livorno with Pietro Nardini, before moving to Madrid with his parents by 1762. He joined the Spanish court as a violinist in the Royal Chapel in 1769. He also became violin teacher to the future Charles IV (then Prince of Asturias), who unlike his father was an avid music lover. In 1788, when Charles IV came to the throne, Brunetti took charge of a newly formed royal ensemble, for which he composed prolifically and also programmed works by European composers of the day, such as Joseph Haydn.

The majority of Brunetti's output (thought to number over 400 pieces) consists of chamber music designed for small ensembles and symphonies for the royal chamber orchestra. Brunetti's prolific output reflects the duties of an 18th-century court composer who was required to craft engaging music for daily performances at his patron's chamber. With its graceful melodies and periodic phrasing, Brunetti's music respects early classical forms and conventions but also incorporates more progressive and eclectic elements.

Due to the constraints of his court service, little of Brunetti's music was published during his lifetime, thereby largely precluding knowledge of his music for almost two centuries. A catalogue of his works (compiled by Germán Labrador) has been available since 2005, which provides details of 346 attributed works with available scores, and lists various other named pieces that are thought to have been lost. This catalogue revealed that the U.S. Library of Congress houses almost half of the surviving manuscript scores.

== Sources ==
- Labrador López de Azcona, Germán (2005). Gaetano Brunetti (1744-1798): catálogo crítico, temático y cronológico (in Spanish and English). Madrid: AEDOM. ISBN 8492219580.
