= Pier Francesco Silvani =

Italian architect and designer

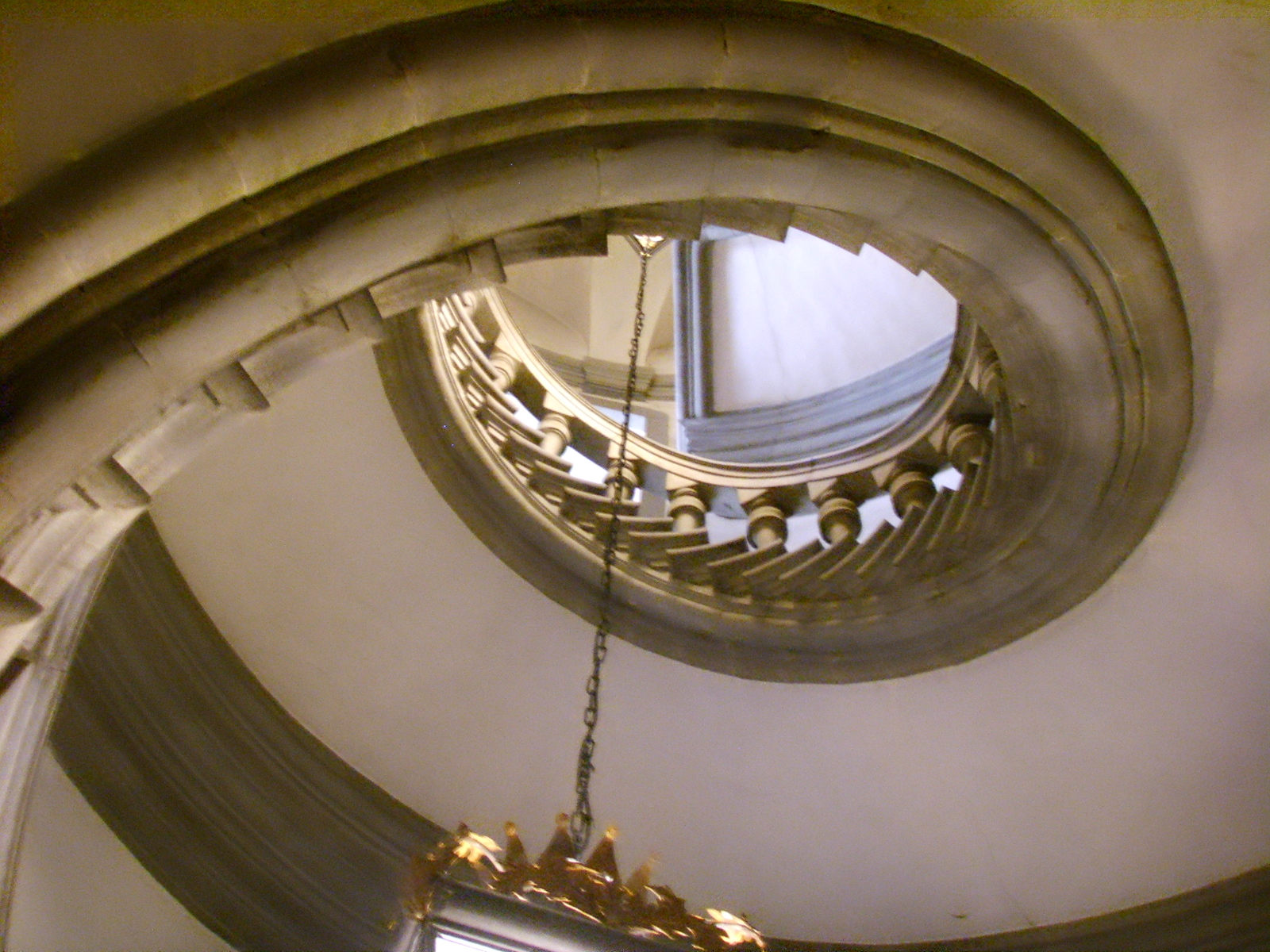
- Spiral staircase of Palazzo Corsini
- Born: 28 June 1619; Florence, Grand Duchy of Tuscany
- Died: 22 August 1685 (aged 66); Pisa, Grand Duchy of Tuscany
- Known for: Architecture
- Movement: Baroque

Pier Francesco Silvani (28 June 1619 – 22 August 1685) was an Italian architect and designer, active during the Baroque period, in Florence and other sites in Tuscany. Pier Francesco worked on San Gaetano and in the refurbishment of San Marco in Florence, as well as in collaboration with Giovanni Battista Foggini, the aisle and high altar for the Church of Santo Stefano dei Cavalieri in Pisa. He also added Baroque touches to Bernardo Buontalenti's garden behind the Palazzo Corsini, Florence.

== Biography ==
He was the son of the Sienese architect Gherardo Silvani. He began his career as an architect in his father's office. He supervised the execution of the façade (1648–83) of the church of Santi Michele e Gaetano and contributed a series of drawings to Pietro da Cortona's scheme for scaling down his Oratorian monastery design, finally developing an alternative project (1658–60), the execution of which continued into the 18th century.

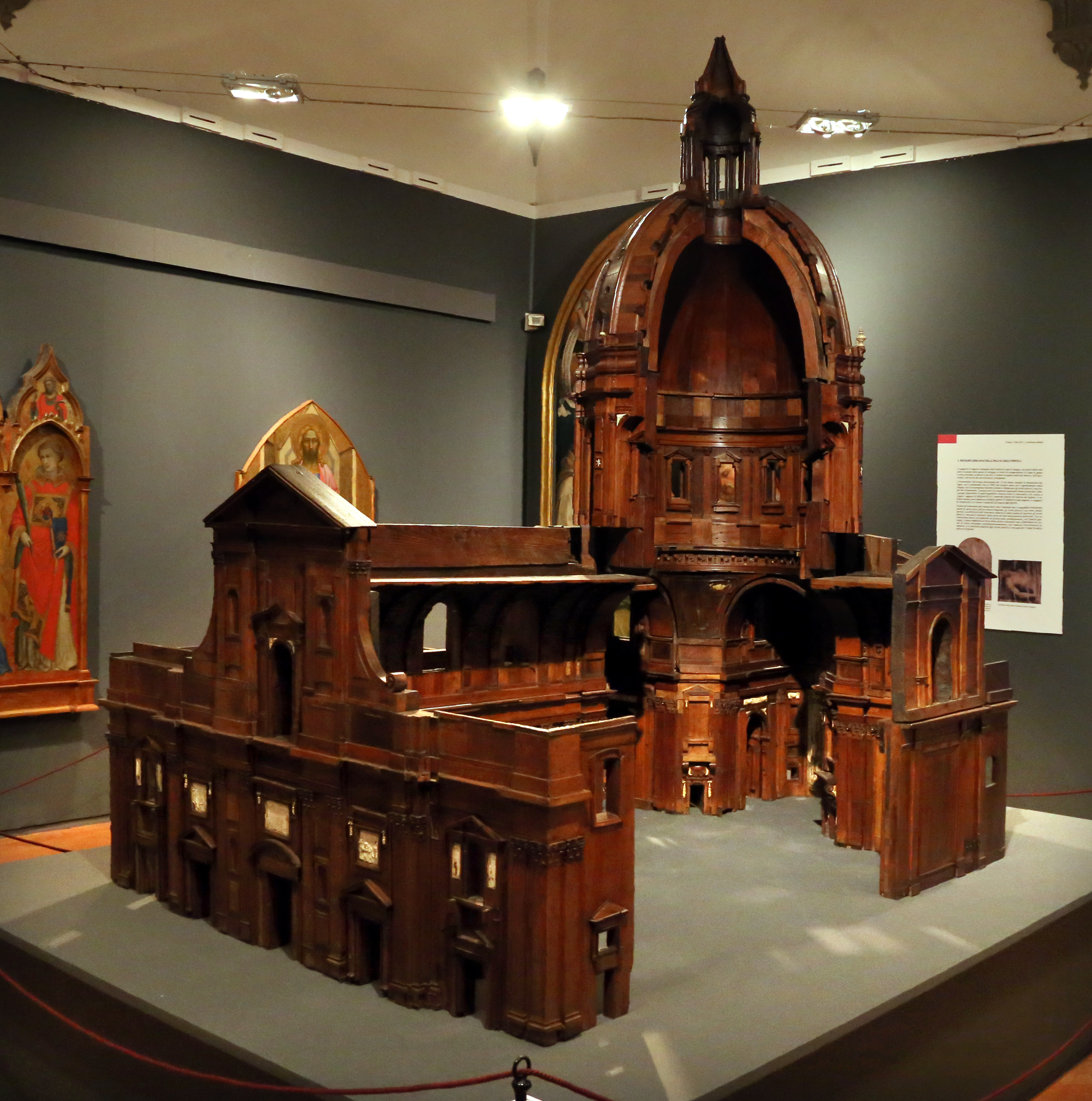
Wooden model for the Church of San Firenze, Florence

In 1668 he began work on the Oratory (now the church of San Firenze), Florence, employing a prominent order of giant pilasters both inside and on the façade, rather than using the more traditional scheme of superimposed orders. Silvani collaborated with Antonio Ferri on the latter's project for the choir of Santa Maria Maddalena dei Pazzi, Florence, contributing both the flooring and the dome (1674–83).

From 1678 he worked on the presbytery of San Marco, Florence, completely dismantling the 15th-century structure and creating a new apsidal space surmounted by a dome and framed by a triumphal arch, which repeats the design of the Serlian motif used for the entrance of the adjacent Salviati chapel by Giambologna.

In 1680 Silvani built the fine spiral staircase in the Palazzo Corsini, although his overall contribution to the complete reconstruction of the building, undertaken from 1685 by Filippo Corsini, remains unclear. He is attributed with a series of project drawings (Florence, Archivio Corsini), in which he envisaged the complete isolation of the palace by inserting a new street along its boundary with the Ricasoli site, while a straight axis, cut through the urban fabric, would have linked the entrance on Via del Parione and the Piazza Rucellai. The U-shaped façade facing the river and the lightness of the triple loggia, which creates a void in the corps de logis, recall the Palazzo Barberini, Rome, a break with Florentine domestic practice that appears to be attributable less to the architect's own choice than to the ideological preferences of the patron with his decidedly Roman tendencies.

Also close to the style of Rome is the chapel (1675–81; wooden model, Florence, Archivio Corsini) designed by Silvani for the Corsini family in the church of Santa Maria del Carmine, Florence. The centralized ground-plan, with four short arms housing altars decorated with large marble altarpieces in low relief (completed 1691) by Giovanni Battista Foggini, recalls such Roman precedents as the Sistine and Paoline chapels in Santa Maria Maggiore.

When Silvani was commissioned to extend and restore Santo Stefano dei Cavalieri, Pisa, he added to the 16th-century church a ring of connected buildings (1682) that included a changing-room for the Cavalieri, a sacristy and chapels. On the exterior this takes the form of two low wings at the back, which also serve to support the building (wooden model: National Museum of San Matteo, Pisa), although the scheme was modified in the 19th century. In collaboration with Foggini, he also presented a design for the high altar, for which two drawings survive (Vienna, Albertina, n. 190 and 192).

Pierfrancesco Silvani by no means avoided the innovative trend that inspired the artistic life of Florence at the end of the 17th century, the institutional outlet for which was the Accademia delle Arti del Disegno (1673–86), founded by Cosimo III de' Medici. In contrast to the other artists with whom he collaborated, however, his approach to such innovation was inclined to compromise, revealing his concern to safeguard links with the Renaissance tradition.

== Bibliography ==
- Baldinucci, Filippo (1681). Notizie de' Professori del Disegno, Da Cimabue in qua, Secolo V. dal 1610. al 1670. Distinto in Decennali [Notice of the Professors of Design, from Cimabue to now, from 1610–1670]. Florence: Santi Franchi. pp. 528–32.
- Lankheit, Klaus (2005). "Die Corsini Kapelle in der Carmine Kirche zu Florenz und ihre Reliefs". Mitteilungen des Kunsthistorischen Instituts in Florenz. 49 (3): 323–52.
