= Antonio Brunelli =

Italian composer (1577–1630

- Born: 20 December 1577; Santa Croce sull'Arno, Tuscany
- Died: November 1630 (aged 52); Pisa, Italy

Antonio Brunelli (20 December 1577 – November 1630) was an Italian composer and theorist of the early Baroque period.

== Biography ==
Antonio Brunelli was born in Santa Croce sull'Arno, Tuscany on 20 December 1577. His primary music instruction was received from Giovanni Maria Nanino in the city of Rome during the 1590s. He later studied with Francesca Caccini in Florence. In 1603 he was appointed maestro di cappella and organist at the Cattedrale di Santa Maria Assunta e di San Genesio in San Miniato where he served until at least August 1607.

In March 1608 Brunelli assumed the post of maestro di capella at the Prato Cathedral, and during his time there he began to move in music circles in Florence. On 12 April 1612 he was appointed as maestro di capella to the Order of Saint Stephen at the Santo Stefano dei Cavalieri Church in Pisa in the service of Cosimo II de' Medici, the Grand Duke of Tuscany. His pupil, composer Giovanni Bettini, followed him to Pisa and was later appointed organist at the Santo Stefano dei Cavalieri in 1618, most likely by Brunelli. He was also the teacher of composer Giovanni Pietro Bucchianti who included a tribute to his teacher in his manuscript Arie, scherzi, e madrigali (1627).

Between 1605 and 1621 he published works including motets, canzonette, Psalms, madrigals, Requiems, and other sacred works, some of which were included in Donfried's Promptuarium musicum (1623). Brunelli wrote and published several theoretical treatises, most notably the Regole utilissime per i scolari che desiderano imperare a cantare (Florence, 1606), one of the first published methods for voice. His other writings include Esercizi ad 1 e 2 voci (Florence, 1607) and Regole et dichiarazione de alcuni contrappunti doppii (Florence, 1610).

Brunelli died shortly before his brother Lorenzo was appointed his successor at the Santo Stefano dei Cavalieri Church in Pisa on 19 November 1630.

== Works ==
- Esercizi a una e due voci [op. 1] – Florence, Marescotti (1605)
- Regole utilissime – Florence, Volcmar Timan (1606)
- Affettuoso et invaghito, Canzonette a tre voci [op. 2] – Florence, Marescotti (1608)
- Mottetti a due voci Lib. 2 [op. 3] – Florence, Marescotti (1608)
- Mottetti a due voci Lib. 2 [op. 4] – Florence, Marescotti (1608)
- Fiori odoranti, Madrigali a tre voci Lib. 1 [op. 5] – Venice (1609)
- Fiammette d'ingenio, Madrigali a tre voci Lib. 2 [op. 6] – Venice (1610)
- Regole et dichiarazioni – Florence, Marescotti (1610)
- Prati di sacri fiori musicali [op. 7] – Venice, Vincenti (1612)
- Canoni vari [op. 8] – Venice, Vincenti (1612)
- Scherzi, arie, ... Lib.1 [op. 9] – Venice, Vincenti (1613)
- Balletto della cortesia (1614)
- Scherzi, arie,... Lib.2 [op. 10] – Venice, Vincenti (1614)
- Varii esercitii [op. 11] – Florence, Zanobi Pignoni (1614)
- Scherzi, arie, ... Lib.3 [op. 12] – Venice, Vincenti (1616)
- In raccolte d'epoca, ristampa di Tibi Laus Tibi Gloria, Mottetto a tre voci con b.c. (1616)
- Godi felice alfea, Aria a 2 voci – Venice, Vincenti (1616)
- Sacra Cantica [op. 13] – Venice, Vincenti (1617)
- Missae Tres Pro Defunctis [op. 14] – Venice, Vincenti (1619)
- 12 Salmi brevi concertati (senza cognome) – Pisa (1629)
- Musica per la festa del 31.1.1620 – (1620)
- Fioretti spirituali [op. 15 ] – Venice, Magni (1621)
- From Ioannes Reinenger "Delicie Sacrae Musicae", Ecce Panis Angelorum e Crux Fidelis a quattro voci – Ingolstadt, Haenlin (1626)

== Recordings ==
- Fioretti Spirituali, Auser Musici, Carlo Ipata, director, Agorà AG 187.1 (1999)
- Arie, scherzi, canzonette & madrigali per suonare & cantare, Auser Musici, Carlo Ipata, director, Symphonia SY 04209 (2005)
