= Guido Rovetto =

Italian priest and composer

Guido Rovetto (fl. 1620s) was an Italian priest and composer. He was chief priest at S. Angelo in Venice. A motet, Gaudete omnes, is included in the Ghirlanda sacra collection of 1625.
