= Santo Stefano dei Cavalieri, Pisa =

Church in Pisa, Italy

Coordinates: 43°43′09.57″N 10°24′03.43″E

Church of Santo Stefano dei Cavalieri
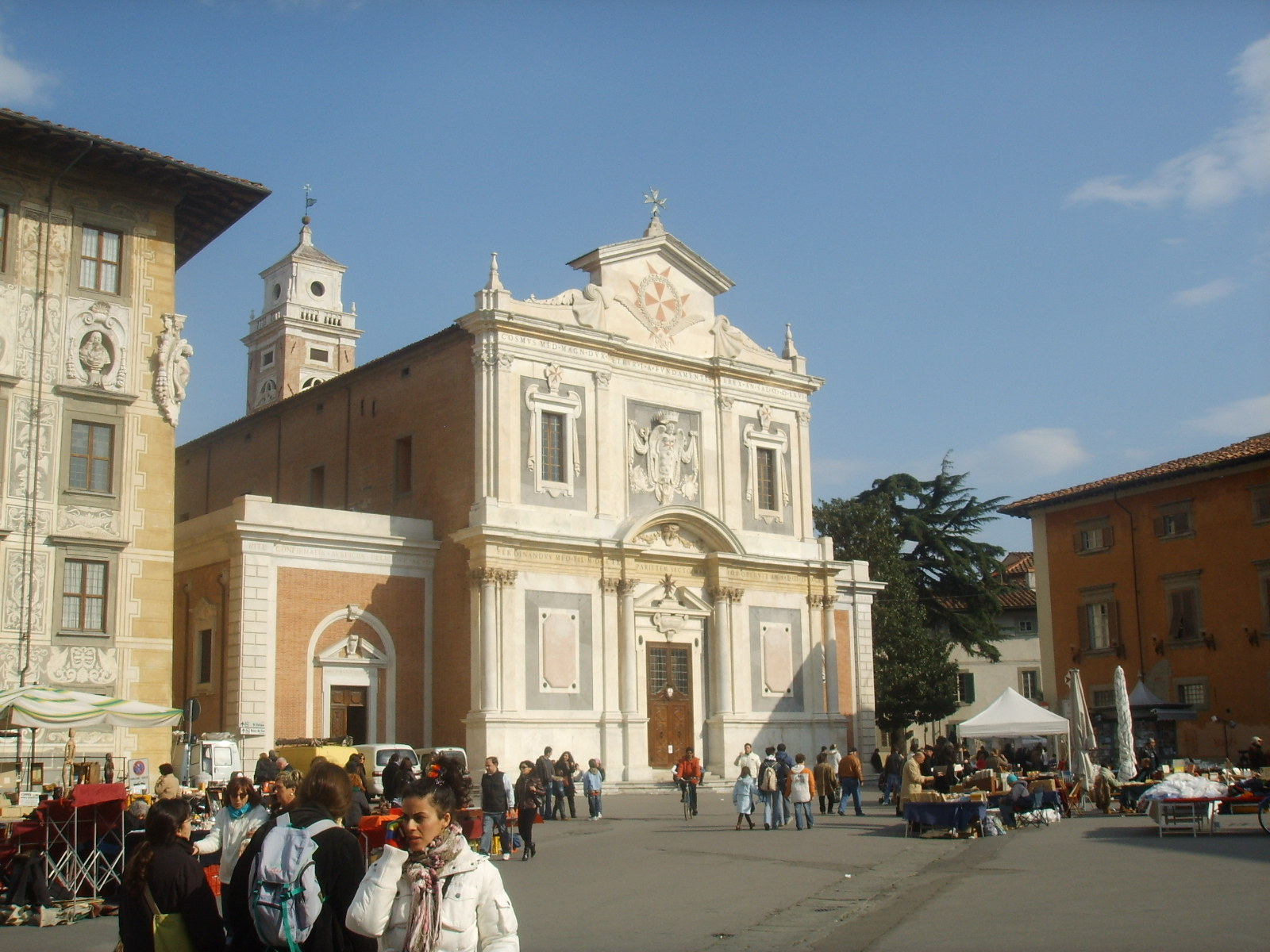

Religion
- Affiliation: Roman Catholic

Location
- Location: Pisa, Italy
- Interactive map of Church of Santo Stefano dei Cavalieri

Architecture
- Architects: Giorgio Vasari, Pasquale Poccianti, Gaetano Niccoli
- Type: Church
- Style: Mannerism
- Groundbreaking: 1565
- Completed: 1859

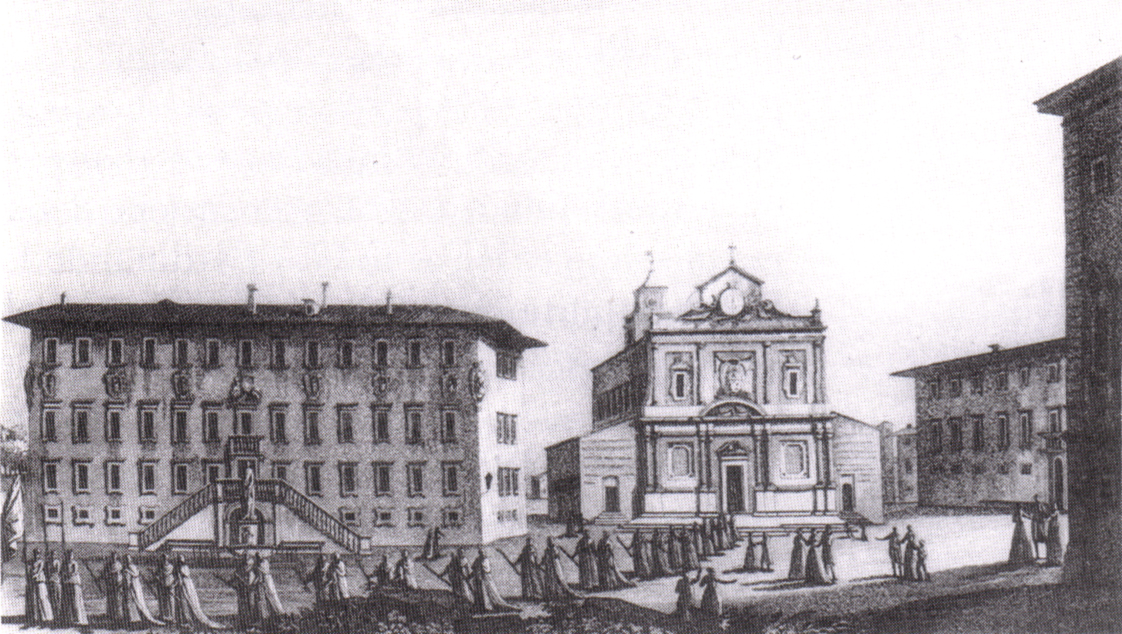
Giuseppe Pera, View of the Piazza dei Cavalieri (1801–1803)

Santo Stefano dei Cavalieri is a church in central Pisa, located on Piazza dei Cavalieri (Knights' Square).

Construction began on 17 April 1565 to provide a place of worship for the Order of Knights of St Stephen, founded by Grand Duke Cosimo I de' Medici to combat Saracen piracy in the Mediterranean. The site was previously occupied by the church of San Sebastiano alle Fabbriche Maggiori, which dated back to at least 1074. The new church was consecrated on 21 December 1569. Its white marble façade was designed by Don Giovanni de' Medici, with help from Alessandro Pieroni, and replaced Vasari’s original design. An inscription commemorates its completion during the reign of Ferdinando I de' Medici.

The bell tower, designed by Vasari, was completed in 1572 by Giovanni Fancelli. The main altar was designed by Pier Francesco Silvani. Over two centuries, several alterations were proposed by architects such as Gherardo Mechini, Paolo Guidotti, Ranieri Gherardi, Torpè Donati, Alessandro Gherardesca, Florido Galli, Niccolò Matas, and Pasquale Poccianti. The final reconstruction in 1859, after the suppression of the order, created the orderly interior column layout seen today.

== Interior ==
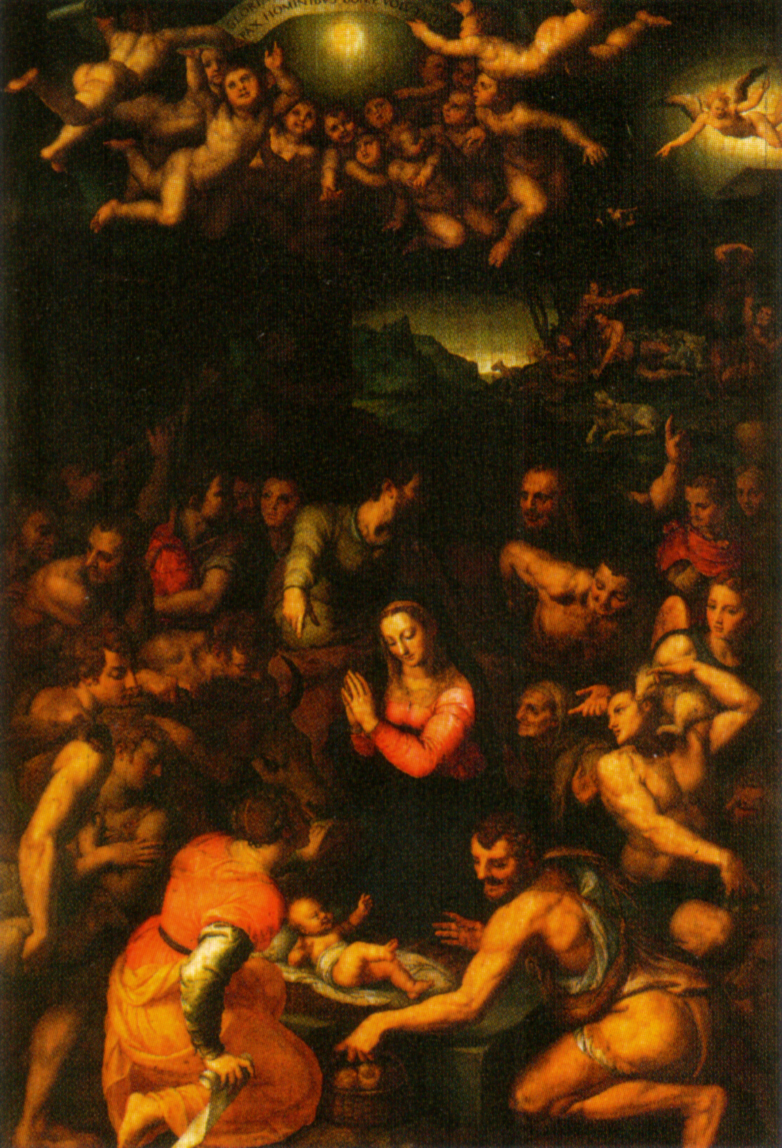
Bronzino, Birth of Christ

The church houses trophy banners captured during naval battles with Saracen pirates. The holy water font (1568) was sculpted by Giovanni Fancelli from Vasari’s design.

The counter-facade contains five monochrome paintings depicting Stories of St Stephen Pope and Martyr, including one celebrating Ferdinando I’s entrance on 31 March 1588. The grand duke also commissioned the wooden ceiling by Bartolomeo Atticciati (1604).

The ceiling features six paintings of historical episodes involving the Order, including Granting of uniforms by Cosimo I de' Medici by Il Cigoli, Return of the Fleet from the Battle of Lepanto and Sacking of Preveza by Jacopo Ligozzi, The Embarkation at Livorno of Maria de' Medici by Allori, and Victory in the Greek Archipelago and Capture of Bône by L'Empoli.

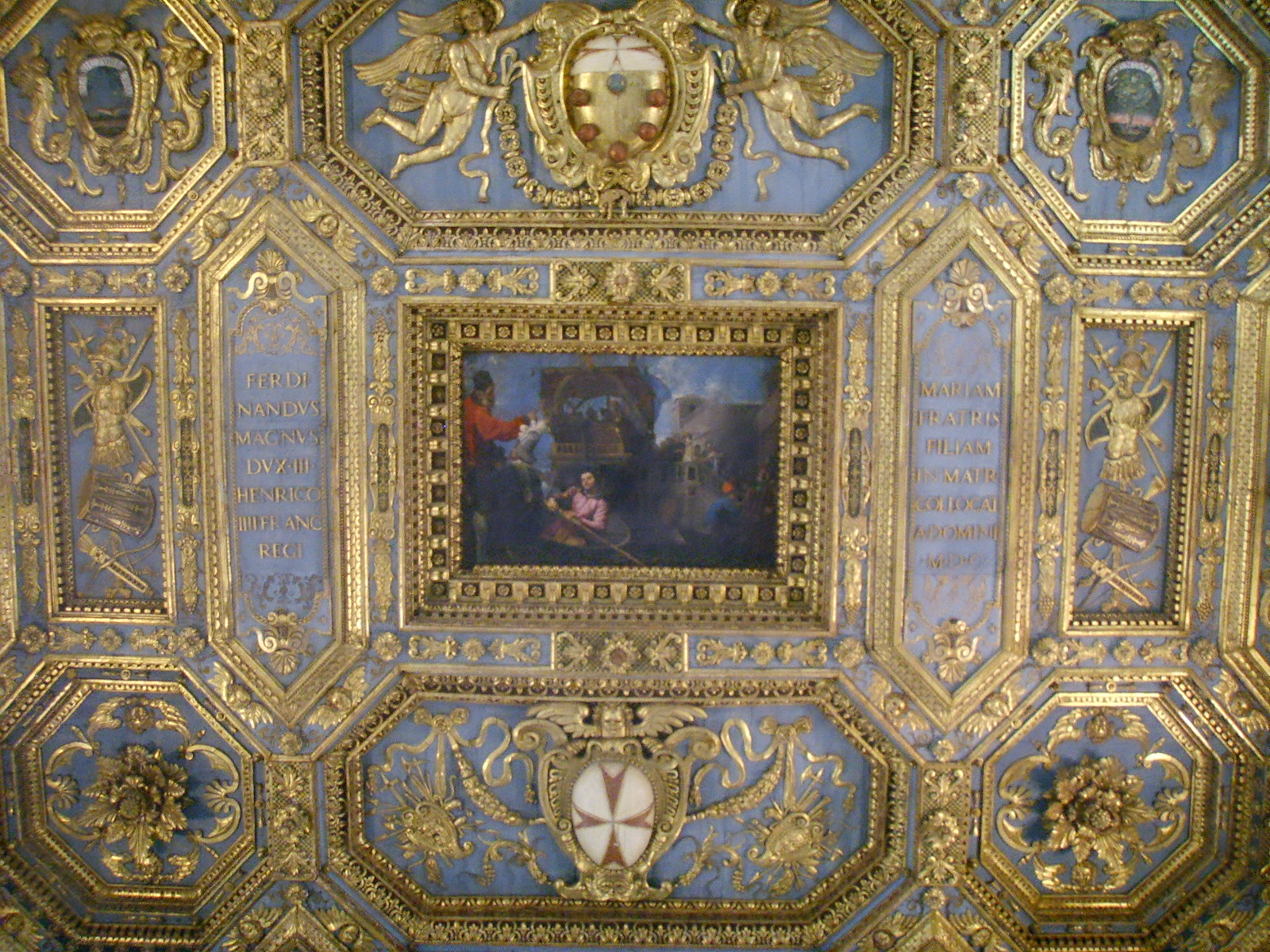
Detail of the wooden ceiling

The polychrome pulpit (1627) was created by Chiarissimo Fancelli. Paintings by Aurelio Lomi include Madonna and Child with Saints Joseph and Stephen (1593) and a depiction of the Order’s palace.

The main altar (1702–1709), designed and sculpted by Giovanni Battista Foggini, features a statue of St Stephen Pope and allegorical figures of Religion and Faith, along with a bronze relief of the Decapitation of St Stephen. To the right is Vasari’s Entombment of St Stephen (1571), and to the left, Bronzino’s Birth of Christ (1564).

The Sacristy contains Foggini’s sculptural group St Stephen and the Allegory of Reason and the Trinity (1683), created for the 1682 translation of the saint’s relics to the church.

The chapel of the Holy Sacrament was completed in 1837 by Florido Galli.

== Organs ==
There are three organs: the first from 1571 by Onofrio Zeffirini, another from 1733 by Azzolino Bernardino della Ciaja, and a 1931 addition by Giovanni Tamburini, which is the only one still functional. Composer Giovanni Bettini was organist here from 1616 to 1624.

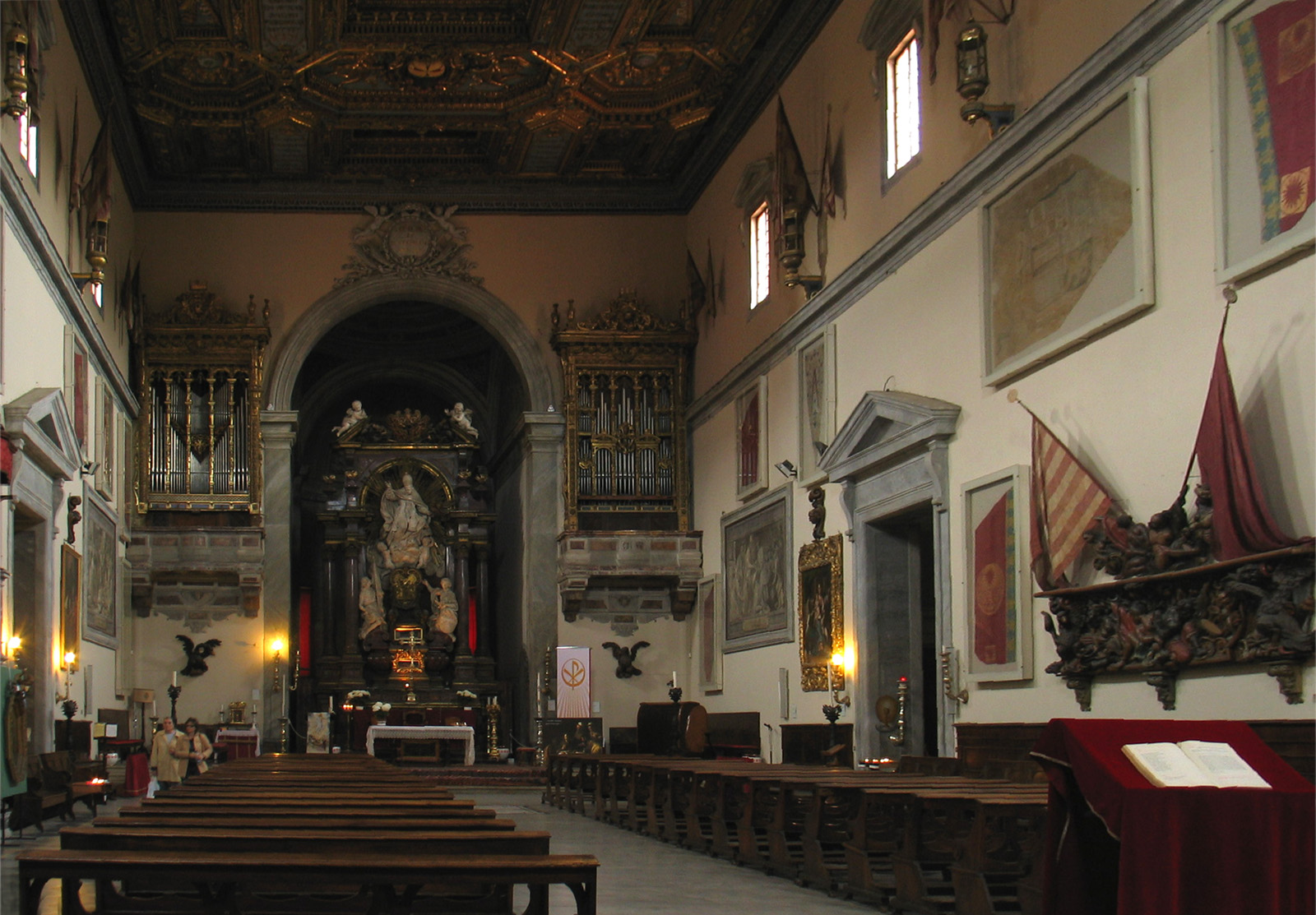
Interior

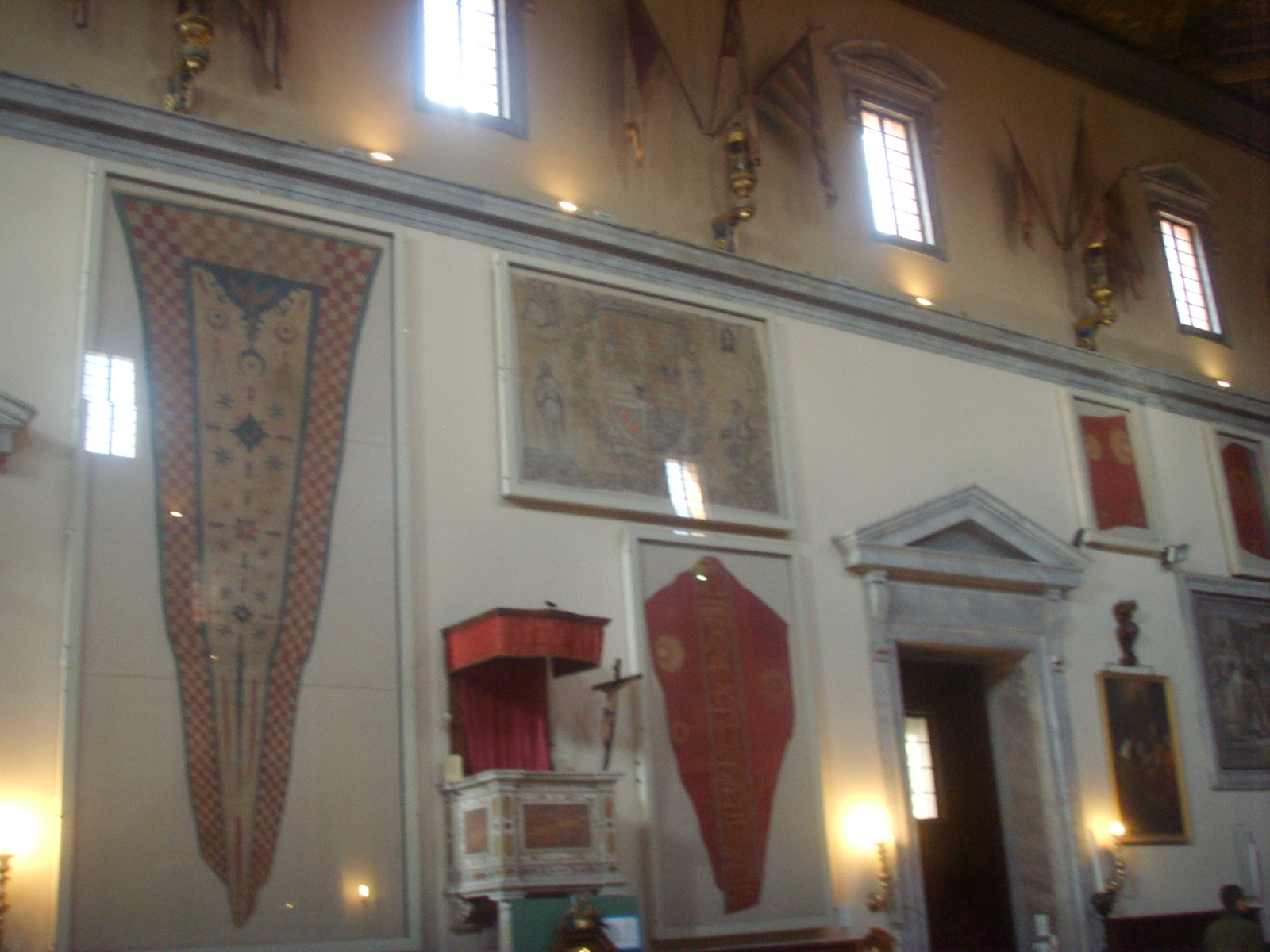
Ottoman and Saracen standards

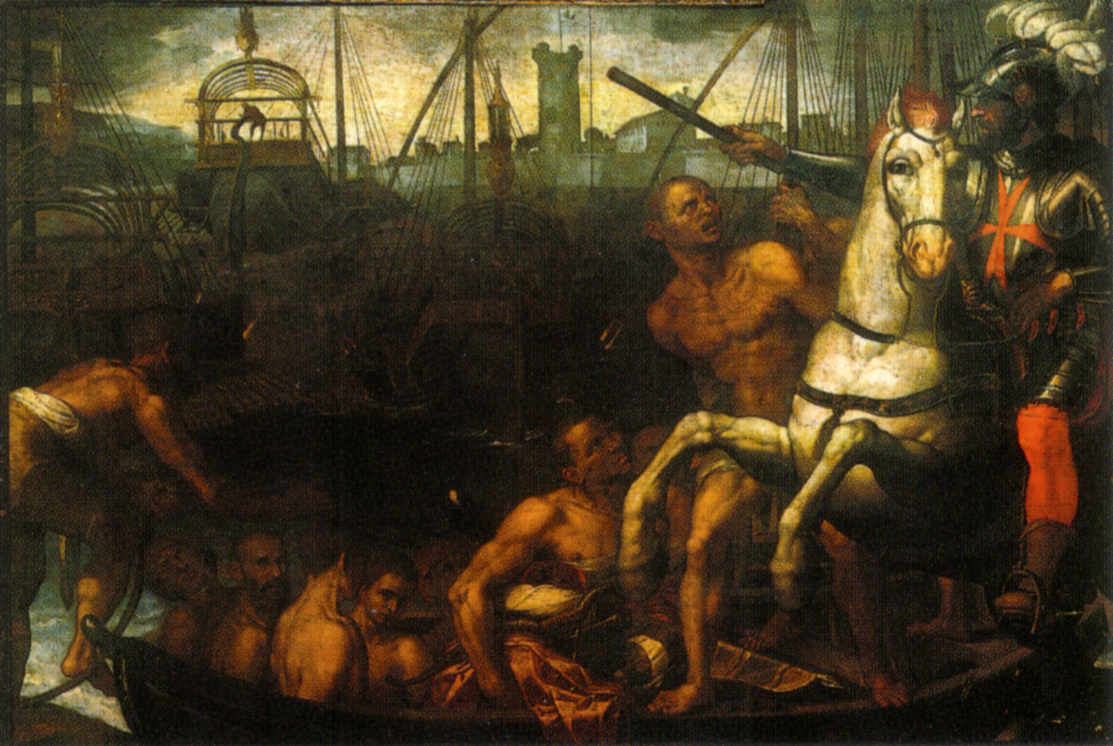
Jacopo Ligozzi, Return of the Knights of St Stephen from Lepanto

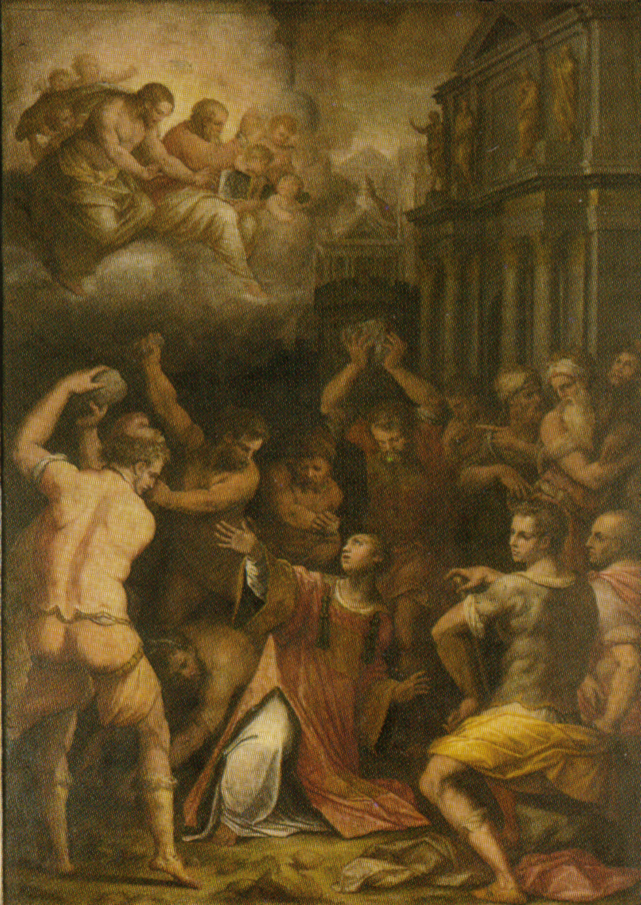
Giorgio Vasari, Entombment of St Stephen
