= Giovanni Battista Fontana (composer) =

Italian composer

- Born: 1589; Brescia, Italy
- Died: 1630 (aged 40–41); Padua, Italy
- Occupations: Composer, violinist
- Era: Early Baroque

Giovanni Battista Fontana (1589–1630) was an early Baroque Italian composer and violinist.

Fontana was born in Brescia, and worked there and in Rome, Venice, and Padua. He died in Padua during the plague of 1629–31.

Nearly all information on Fontana comes from the preface by Fr. Giovanni Battista Reghino to his posthumously published 18 (sometimes incorrectly stated 12) sonatas (Sonate a 1.2.3. per il violino, o cornetto, fagotto, chitarone, violoncino o simile altro istromento, Venice: Bartolomeo Magni, 1641). They are among the earliest sonatas of this form, consisting of six sonatas for solo violin/cornetto with continuo and 12 sonatas for one to three violins and continuo, the latter group often including a demanding concertante part for bassoon or cello.

"An atto di morte dated 7 September 1630 for a 'Zan Batta Fontana' aged 50, is the only one among the Paduan death registers of 1625–30 for a person bearing that name" (Dunn 2014).
