= Gasparo Locatello =

Italian composer and canon

Gasparo Locatello (c. 1550 – 1625) was an Italian composer and canon at Saint Mark's in Venice.
