= Giuseppe Scarani =

Italian composer

Giuseppe Scarani (fl. 1628 - fl. 1642) was an Italian organist, singer and composer.

== Biography ==
A monk of the Carmelite order, he was employed in Mantua as an organist at the Carmelite Church in 1628. He was hired as a singer in the St. Mark Basilica in Venice in January 1629, and was probably also associated with Santa Maria del Carmelo. He returned to Mantua by 1641, at which point he is recorded as organist of the Duke of Modena.

== Compositions and style ==
His compositions include two volumes of two-part madrigals (completed by 1628), a volume of Sonate concertante for two and three instruments (op. 1, 1630), which showcase both the church and chamber styles. The title is a reference to a publication by Castello (Sonate concertante in stil moderno), and the whole of the collection easily shows influences from this and other early baroque masterpieces by Castello and Marini.

His only other extant contributions are a volume of Concerti ecclesiastici (op. 2, 1641), a manuscript motet, Bona Jesu, and another motet published in the Dritter Theil geistlichen Concerten und Harmonien in Leipzig, in 1642.

== Sources ==
- Apel, Willi (1990). Italian Violin Music of the Seventeenth Century. Indiana University Press. pp. 91–97. ISBN 978-0-253-30683-8.
- San Francisco Early Music Society (2015). "1629 Venice—Inspiration and Improvisation".
- Selfridge-Field, Eleanor (1972). "Addenda to Some Baroque Biographies". Journal of the American Musicological Society. 25 (2): 236–240. doi:10.2307/830598. ISSN 0003-0139. JSTOR 830598.
- Selfridge-Field, Eleanor (2001). "Scarani, Giuseppe". Grove Music Online. doi:10.1093/gmo/9781561592630.article.24706. ISBN 978-1-56159-263-0.
