= Giovanni Maria Scorzuto =

Italian composer and organist

Giovanni Maria Scorzuto (fl. 1625 – c. 1636) was an Italian composer and organist. He was maestro di cappella at the M. Comunità of Asola, Trevigiana from at least 1625 through 1636; possibly there before and after. His only known work is the motet O bone Jesu for soprano and continuo. It was published in Leonardo Simonetti's collection Ghirlanda sacra, 1625. Nothing else is known about Scorzuto.
