= Giovanni Antonio Bianchi =

Italian friar (1686–1768)

Brother Giovanni Antonio Bianchi OFM
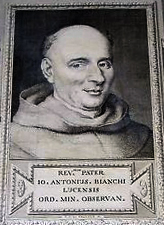

Personal life
- Born: 2 October 1686 Lucca, Republic of Lucca
- Died: 18 January 1768 (aged 81) Rome, Papal States

Religious life
- Religion: Roman Catholic

Giovanni Antonio Bianchi (1686–1768) was an Italian Friar Minor, theologian, and minor Tuscan poet.

== Life ==
Giovanni Antonio Bianchi was born at Lucca on 2 October 1686. At the age of seventeen he entered the Franciscan Order. He was once elected to the office of Provincial of the Roman Province, and for a number of years was professor of philosophy and theology. During these years of professorship, he no doubt acquired much of the extensive acquaintance with ecclesiastical subjects displayed in the productions of his later life. He possessed a memory of such range and tenacity that he was considered a prodigy by the many students and scholars who came to visit him in his convent cell. Bianchi was held in high esteem by the Roman Curia and by Clement XII, whose successor, Benedict XIV, appointed him consultor of the Holy Office. He died at Rome on 18 January 1768, aged eighty-one.

== Works ==
It was perhaps at the instance of Clement XII that Bianchi composed his scholarly and exhaustive defence of the rights and privileges of the Roman Pontiff, which had been attacked by the Neapolitan lawyer, Pietro Giannone, in the latter's Storia civile del regno di Napoli. Bianchi's work which was entitled Della podesta e della polizia della chiesa, trattati due contro le nuove opinioni di Pietro Giannone appeared in Rome in six volumes between the years 1745 and 1751. In the first treatise (2 volumes) Bianchi defends the indirect power of the Roman Pontiff over temporal sovereigns; while he defends the rights of the pope as regards the external laws and government of the Church, in the second treatise, which comprises the remaining four volumes. Amid the storm of controversial literature provoked by the treatise of the Dominican theologian, Daniele Concina, De Spectaculis theatralibus, Bianchi's Sui vizii e sui difetti del moderno teatro e sul modo di corregerli ed emendarli appeared at Rome in 1753. In this he contends with Scipio Maffei against Concina for the lawfulness, within certain limits, of modern theatrical displays.

Notwithstanding these graver preoccupations, Bianchi found time to indulge his predilection for poetry and tragic writing; and, according to the Catholic Encyclopedia, his compositions in this field, though of minor importance, show him to be an accomplished master of his own native Tuscan.

== Sources ==
- D'Alençon, Édouard (1910). "Bianchi, Jean-Antoine". In Vacant, A.; Mangenot, E. (eds.). Dictionnaire de théologie catholique. Vol. 2. Paris: Letouzey et Ané. pp. 812–813.
- Feller, François-Xavier de (1848). "Bianchi (Jean-Antoine)". Biographie universelle. New ed. Paris: J. Leroux, Jouby et C^{e}; Gaume Frères. p. 291.
- Hurter, Hugo von (1879–1881). Nomenclator Literarius Recentioris Theologiae Catholicae. Vol. 2, Part 2. Innsbruck: Libraria Academia Wagneriana. pp. 1454–1456 (1530–1532).
- Lindon, John (2005). "Bianchi, Giovanni Antonio (1686–1758)". In Hainsworth, Peter; Robey, David (eds.). The Oxford Companion to Italian Literature. Oxford UP. Retrieved 14 September 2022.
- Pincherle, Alberto (1930). "Bianchi, Giovanni Antonio". Enciclopedia Italiana. Retrieved 14 September 2022 – via Treccani.it.
- Ricuperati, Giuseppe (1968). "Bianchi, Giovanni Antonio". Dizionario Biografico degli Italiani. Vol. 10. Retrieved 14 September 2022 – via Treccani.it.
- Schulte, Johann Friedrich von (1880). Geschichte der Quellen und Litteratur des Canonischen Rechts. Vol. 3. Stuttgart: Ferdinand Enke. pp. 512–513.
- "Bianchi, Giovanni Antonio". Enciclopedia on line. Retrieved 14 September 2022 – via Treccani.it.
