= Andrea Stella (composer) =

Italian priest and composer

Andrea Stella (fl. 1620s) was an Italian priest and composer.
