= Matteo Zocarini =

Italian composer

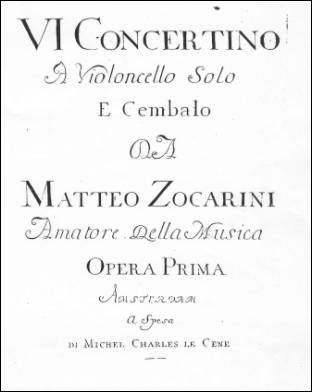
Front page of Zocarini's 6th concertino.

Matteo Zocarini was an 18th-century Italian composer. His biographical details are unknown.

The only pieces of music known from him are 6 concertini for cello and basso continuo, printed around 1740. The sheet music incorrectly states that it was printed by the noted Amsterdam music publisher Michel-Charles Le Cène; the true publisher is unknown. The cover of this sheet music refers to Zocarini as an amatore della musica, or musical amateur.

It is understood that Zocarini was a virtuouso cellist, thus the special attention for this instrument in his composing work. There is a possibility that he played in Paris under the name Zuccharini in 1737.

The character of the music composed by Zocarini is described as comparable with Bach's Italian Concert.
