= Giovanni Bettini =

Italian composer and organist

Giovanni Bettini (fl. 1616 – c. 1624) was an Italian composer and organist of the Baroque period.

== Life and career ==
Bettini's place and date of birth are not known. It is known that he trained as a musician under Antonio Brunelli, most likely in the city of Prato in the 1610s but possibly earlier in San Miniato. When Brunelli was appointed maestro di cappella of the Grand Duke of Tuscany to the Order of Saint Stephen at the Santo Stefano dei Cavalieri Church in Pisa in 1613 he followed his teacher to that city. What little evidence exists indicates he remained in Pisa for probably the rest of his life. In 1618 Bettini was appointed organist at the Santo Stefano dei Cavalieri, most likely by Brunelli. He remained in that post until May 1624. Nothing is known about him after this, including when and where he died.

Bettini's known music was published in volumes of music that were compiled by two other composers from Pisa: Vincenzo Calestani and his teacher Brunelli. These include Brunelli’s 1616 volume Scherzi, arie, canzonette, e madrigali and Calestani’s 1617 volume Madrigali et arie (1617). The Brunelli volume contains two art songs for solo voice and one vocal trio by Bettini. Calestani's volume contains his setting of the text "O primavera, gioventù dell’anno"; a poem earlier set to music by Domenico Visconti. The Prague National Museum has additional music by Bettini not published in those volumes, including five secular duets and trios, a single solo aria, and a lettera amorosa.
