= Franco Margola =

Italian composer

Franco Margola (Orzinuovi, Brescia, 30 October 1908 – Nave, Brescia, 9 March 1992), was a 20th-century Italian composer.

== Compositions ==
=== Operas ===
- Il mito di Caino
- Il Titone (lost)

=== Symphonic works ===
- Sinfonia delle Isole, for string orchestra
- Il campiello delle streghe (1930)
- Trittico for Strings (1936-7)
- Arioso for Strings (1939)
- Notturno e Fuga for String Orchestra (1940)
- Teorema armonico
- Sei Madrigali for Strings
- Antiche Musiche di Virginalisti Inglesi, for Strings
- Sinfonia per orchestra (published by Bongiovanni in 1961)
- Passacaglia per orchestra (published by Bongiovanni in 1962)

=== Concertos ===
- Violoncello Concerto Op. 91 (1949)
- Kinderkonzert No. 1 for Piano and String Orchestra (1954)
- Kinderkonzert No. 2 for Violin and Orchestra (1954)
- Partita for Oboe and Strings
- Little Concerto for Oboe and Strings
- Concerto for Oboe and Strings [Unfinished]
- Concertos for oboe, bassoon, horn, piano, violin, guitar, and a double concerto for violin, piano and strings.

=== Chamber music ===
- One quintet published in 1934.
- 8 String quartets (1935-1950)
- Quintet for Piano and Strings No. 1, dC 17 (1933)
- Quintet for Piano and Strings No. 2, dC 83 (1946)
- Quartet No. 7 for Flute and String Trio, dC 87 (1948)
- Sonatina a sei for Winds and Piano (1961)
- La Longobarda, for Flute, Oboe, and Piano, dC 208 (1976)
- Sonata a tre for Oboe, Clarinet and Bassoon
- Quattro Bagatelle for Winds
- Piccola Suonata for Violin and Piano (1929)
- Cello Sonata in E major (between 1931–45)
- Cello Sonata No. 3 in C major
- Violin Sonata No. 1 in D major (1931)
- Sonata Breve (No. 3) for Violin and Piano (1937)
- Violin Sonata No. 4, Op. 32 No. 1 (1944)
- Violin Sonata No. 5, Op. 32 No. 1 (1959)
- Notturnino for Flute and Piano, dC 80 (1945)
- Duo for Flute and Viola, dC 104 (1953)
- Partita for Flute and Oboe, dC 115 (1956)
- Three Pieces for Flute and Piano, dC 116 (1957)
- Six Duets for Two Flutes, dC 184 (1974)
- Sonata No. 4 for Flute and Guitar, dC 191 (1974-5)
- Sonata for Flute and Piano, dC 230 (1978)'
- Contrasts, for Flute and Contrabass, dC 324 (1983)
- Five Impressions for Flute and Guitar, dC 698 (1985?)
- Three Pieces for Clarinet and Piano
- Three Pieces for Bassoon and Piano
- Three Impressioni for Flute in G and Piano (19??)
- Four sonatas for Flute and Guitar (1974, 75)

=== Piano Solo ===
- Burlesca, dC 1 (1928)
- Danza a Notturno, dC 3
- Il Cieco di Lorolenko, dC 7 (1929)
- Tarantella-Rondò, dC 24 (1938)
- Piccola Rapsodia d'Autunno, dC 28 (1941)
- Valzer, dC 36 (1934)
- Leggenda, dC 39 (1938)
- Preludio in Do, dC 52 (1938)
- Toccata, dC 55 (1938)
- Sonata a Domenico Scarlatti, dC 60 (1944)
- Preludio in La, dC 64 (1940)
- Sonatina per Pianoforte, Op. 26, dC 71 (1942)
- Mosaico, dC 95 (1952)
- Sei Sonatine Facili, dC 108
- Tre Pezzi, dC 111 (1955)
- Quattro Sonatine, dC 112
- Prima Sonata per Pianoforte, dC 113 (1956)
- Seconda Sonata per Pianoforte, dC 117 (1957)
- Terza Sonata per Pianoforte, dC 118 (1957)
- Sonata Quarta per Pianoforte, dC 122 (1958)
- Danza e Notturno, dC 123
- Quindici Pezzi Facili, dC 160 (1970)
- Altri Quindici Pezzi Facili, dC 179 (1973)
- [Senza Titolo], dC 188
- Primavera, dC 189 (1989)
- Bagatella, dC 215 (19??)
- Improvviso, dC 248 (1979)
- Quinta Sonata per Pianoforte, dC 308 (1982)
- Omaggio ad Uno frai i Più Grandi Musicisti 'Italiani d'Italia', dC 329 (1984)
- [Senza Titolo], dC 616
- [Senza Titolo], dC 617
- [Senza Titolo], dC 619
- [Senza Titolo], dC 622
- [Senza Titolo], dC 623
- [Senza Titolo], dC 626
- [Senza Titolo], dC 627
- [Senza Titolo], dC 628
- Allegro con brio, dC 639
- Mazurka, dC 641
- Moderato, dC 642
- Moderato, dC 643
- Saltarello, dC 644

=== Solo Guitar ===
- Sonata prima
- Sonata seconda
- Sonata terza
- Sonata quarta
- Sonata quinta
- Sei Bagatelle
- Trittico
- Meditativo
- Ballata
- Caccia
- Ultimo Canto
- Otto Miniature
- Due Studi
