= Giuseppe Galli (composer) =

Italian Baroque composer

Giuseppe Galli (fl. 1598) was an Italian composer of the Baroque period.

== Scholarship ==
Almost nothing is known about Giuseppe Galli, including the year of his birth and death. It is known that he was from the city of Milan, where his anthology of music Sacri operis musici alternis modulis concinendi liber primus … missam unam vocibus novenis; 8 motecta octonis; 3 item cantiones musicis instrumentis was published in 1598. Only the title page of this work survives. However, Galli's motet for eight voices, Veni in hortum meum, was published in 1600 in an anthology from South Germany. This publication likely took the motet from Galli's 1598 anthology. The motet reveals Galli to be a skilful polychoral composer. No other details of the composer are known, and no other works by Galli are known to have survived.
