= Giuseppe Allevi =

Italian composer

Giuseppe Allevi, sometimes given as Giuseppe Levi, (born 1603 or 1604 – died July 18, 1670) was an Italian composer of the Baroque period. He was most likely born in the city of Piacenza. His ballet Le ninfe del Po premiered in that city for Carnival in 1644. It was given in honor of Francesco I d'Este and Maria Caterina Farnese, the Duke and Duchess of Modena, who were visiting the city. By 1652 he was working as the maestro di cappella at the Piacenza Cathedral; a position he held until his death on July 18, 1670. The New Grove Dictionary of Music and Musicians states that some sources have incorrectly given his year of death as 1668. As a composer he mainly wrote concertato motets.
