= Pietro Baldassare =

Italian composer

Pietro Baldassare or Baldassari was a Baroque composer, possibly born in Rome or Brescia, Italy about 1683.

Baldassari was maestro di cappella at San Filippo Neri in Brescia from 1714 until about 1768. He was also maestro di cappella at San Clemente, Brescia until 1754. He died some time after 1768. Few of the compositions attributed to him survive. Some of these are:

- Componimento per musica, Il giudizio di Paride
- Sonata No. 1 in F for cornett, strings and basso continuo
