= Leandro Gallerano =

Italian composer

Leandro Gallerano (fl. 1615–1632) was an Italian composer.

His works include a Missa Defunctorum for five voices and basso continuo (1615).
