= Giovanni Battista Bianchi (composer, flourished 1675) =

Giovanni Battista Bianchi (fl. 1675) was an Italian Augustinian monk, composer, and organist of the Baroque period.

== Life and career ==
Not much is known about Giovanni Battista Bianchi. He was born in Genoa but the year of his birth is not known. He was an Augustinian monk. He moved to Bologna where he was active as an organist in the year 1675. His only known work is a collection of madrigals published in Bologna in 1675 under the title Madrigali a due e tre voci op. 1. This vocal music collection includes 15 trios and two duets. They are dedicated to a Signora Livia Grilla. Nothing else is known about the composer.

Bianchi should not be confused with the Milanese composer and violinist Giovanni Bianchi (composer, born c. 1660), or with the later composer Giovanni Battista Bianchi (composer, flourished 1780–1782) who was active in London.
