= Giuseppe Olivieri (composer) =

Italian composer

Giuseppe Olivieri (fl. 1617 – c. 1623) was an Italian composer and poet of the Baroque period.

== Scholarship ==
Giuseppe Olivieri's only surviving works are the music anthologies La turca armoniosa, para dos y tres voces y bajo continuo (1617, Rome) and La pastorella Armilla variamente cantata a una, a due, a tre voci con il basso continuo (1620, Rome). These two manuscripts consist of a collection of vocal music duets and trios written in a polyphonic madrigal style and utilizing poetry by Olivieri. The 1617 volume contains five trios and sixteen duets.

Little is known about Olivieri with the first indication of his existence being the 1617 publication. In 1620, he was in service to the Duke of Altemps, and in 1622, he was made maestro di cappella at the Archbasilica of Saint John Lateran. He was still in that post in 1623, but after this there are no more records of the composer. It's speculated that he may have died in Rome in 1623 but there is no evidence to confirm this.
