= Domenico Obizzi =

Italian composer and singer

Domenico Obizzi (fl. 1620s) was an Italian composer and singer. Worked in S Marco, Venice 1627 to 1630.

At age 13, he composed a motet for solo voice and continuo, Jubilate Deo, and in 1627 wrote Madrigali concertati a 2–5 voci con il basso continuo, libro primo and Madrigali et arie a voce sola, libro primo. According to R. Miller, "Obizzis music is well crafted and shows mastery not only in the fusion of affective madrigalian techniques with lilting tunefulness within the same strophic aria, but also in the way short epigrammatic madrigal texts are dramatized through clever repetitions of text and music.". Surviving works include his Madrigali et arie, Op.2.
