= Paolo Longo (composer) =

Italian composer and conductor (born 1967)

Paolo Longo (born October 30, 1967, in Trieste, Italy) is an Italian composer and conductor.

== Life ==
He studied composition, piano and conducting in Trieste, where he graduated in 1990 with highest honors. In 1998 he moved to France, where he lived until 2007.

His works (mainly chamber, vocal and piano music) have been awarded in several International Competitions; he received First Prize in the Edvard Grieg Memorial Competition in Oslo in 2003, the ADNM Competition in Tarragona and the Ivan Spassov competition in Plovdiv in 2004, the Tokyo chamber music competition and the Renée B. Fisher Composer Awards in New Haven in 2005, the Onde Musicali competition in Taranto, the ISCM-Miami competition and the competition of the Académie Internationale de Lutèce in Paris in 2006. He has also earned second prizes and special mentions in Rome (Premio Valentino Bucchi), Piacenza (Egidio Carella Competition), Geneva (Prix Reine Marie José), Urbana-Champaign (Salvatore Martirano Memorial Composition Award), Angoulême, Cuneo, Auckland and many others.

His compositions (based on diverse processes as cellular proliferation and spectral synthesis) have been performed in festivals and in concert seasons in Europe, in the United States, in Japan and in New Zealand; they have been broadcast by radios and TV channels. His first stage work, Le Songe d'un habitant du Mogol (text by Jean de la Fontaine, derived from a story in the Gulistan of Sa'di), commissioned by the Atelier Lyrique de Tourcoing, has been premiered in Lille (“Festival Lille 3000”) in 2007. Most of his works are published by Symétrie (Lyon, France).

As a conductor, he works especially into contemporary music; he premiered works by composers such as Bruno Bettinelli, Aldo Clementi, Azio Corghi, Pascal Dusapin, Michaël Levinas, Giacomo Manzoni, Ennio Morricone, Francesco Pennisi and many others. In 1996 he co-founded (with the composer Stefano Procaccioli) the Taukayensemble, with which he has commissioned numerous works, and has since served as its principal conductor and music director.

== Selected works ==
Stage

- Le Songe d'un habitant du Mogol, "Scènes modulaires sur des fables de Jean de la Fontaine" for speaker, children's chorus, clarinet (+ bass clarinet), soprano saxophone (+ baritone saxophone), viola, cello, harpsichord and percussion

Chamber music

- Albertson-Variations for piccolo (+ alto flute), E♭ clarinet, bassoon, viola and cello
- D'autres discordances for soprano saxophone (+ alto saxophone) and piano
- E già sono deserto – "Quasi un notturno" for viola and 5 instruments (2005)
- Etchings II for violin and piano
- Giants "Quattro incisioni" for 4 saxophones
- Histoires de cendre for 2 pianos and percussion
- Rouge Clair-Obscur for piccolo, E♭ clarinet, bass clarinet, bass trombone, cello and double bass
- Schegge for clarinet, bass clarinet, cello and double bass

Piano

- Monologo Primo, "...d'une sphère sans lumière..."
- Monologo Secondo, "Sphynxs-Vari(A)zioni"
- Jeux et Berceuses
- Etchings IV, "Nove paesaggi facili"

Vocal and choral

- Ammonizione for mezzo-soprano, viola, vibraphone
- ...Astrali nidi..., "Quasi un madrigale" for 3 sopranos, 3 mezzo-sopranos, 3 altos, bass clarinet, viola and piano; text by Giuseppe Ungaretti
- Neiges, "Quasi una scena" for soprano, baritone, bass clarinet, trumpet, trombone, piano and 2 suspended cymbals; text by Jean Cocteau
- Quare fremuerunt gentes for mixed chorus; Biblical text
