= Alfonso dalla Viola =

Italian composer

Alfonso dalla Viola (also della Viola) (c. 1508 – c. 1573) was an Italian composer and instrumentalist of the Renaissance. He was the principal composer at the Este court in Ferrara for about four decades in the middle sixteenth century, and was renowned as a player of several instruments, including the viola d'arco. While much of his incidental music, composed for court entertainments, is lost, several books of his madrigals have survived. His position as court composer in Ferrara paralleled that of Francesco Corteccia in the competing city of Florence.

== Biography ==
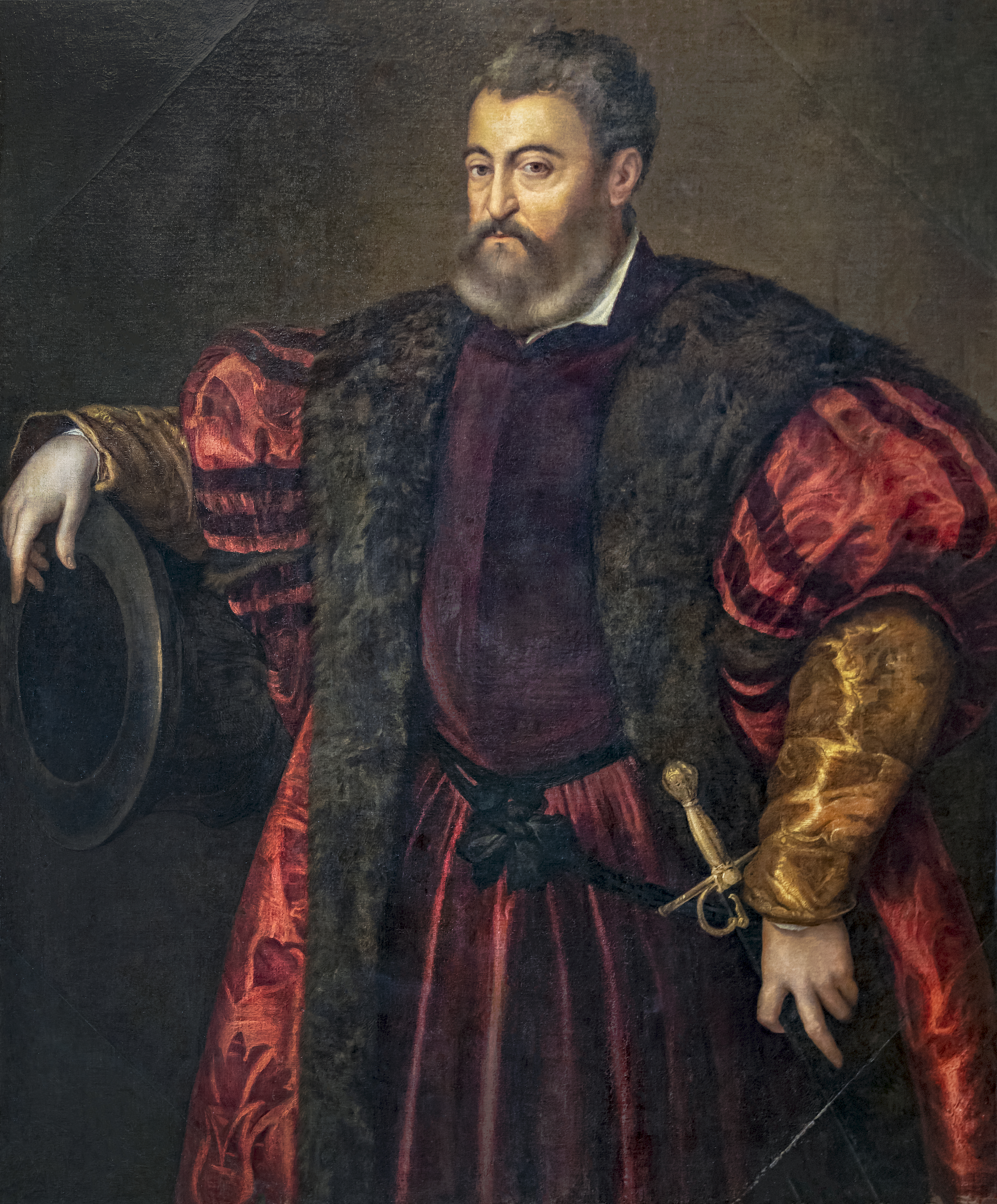
Alfonso d'Este after Titian (attributed to Bastianino): Alfonso leans on a cannon, holding his sword. Duke Alfonso was dalla Viola's first employer.

Alfonso was one of a large family of musicians active at the court of Ferrara, including Andrea and his brother Zampaulo dalla Viola, active from the 1470s to shortly after 1500; Agostino, son of Andrea, a singer and instrumentalist who is documented from around 1497 to 1522; and the younger Alfonso and Francesco, whose exact relationship to the other three has not been firmly established.

Few details have emerged about Alfonso's early life. He was born in Ferrara, and his father may have been Agostino dalla Viola. If true, Alfonso was born out of wedlock. In 1528 he was already leading the Duke of Ferrara's private musical establishment, the musica da camera segreta, presumably both as a performer and composer, and it was in this same year that he wrote music for the wedding festivities surrounding the marriage of Duke Ercole's son and Renata of Lorraine. Dalla Viola was to remain in the employ of the Este family for all of his long life, variously as a composer, performer, and coordinator of music for the plays performed at the court. As principal arranger of incidental music for plays, he served from around 1541 to 1567. While most of the music for these events has been lost, one intriguing fragment remains: a musical invocation by a priest to the god Pan, sung by a solo bass voice, and probably accompanied by chords on an instrument such as the lira da braccio. If so, according to Alfred Einstein, it is the earliest known example of an accompanied recitative in music.

Dalla Viola was the Estense analogue in Ferrara to Francesco Corteccia, the leading musician to the Medici in Florence: both composed music for the sumptuous entertainments at their respective courts; both were early and prolific composers of madrigals; and both were succeeded, and overshadowed, by more famous musicians (Alessandro Striggio in the case of Corteccia, and Cipriano de Rore in the case of dalla Viola).

Dalla Viola died in Ferrara around 1573.

== Music ==
Two volumes of madrigals by Dalla Viola survive, published in Ferrara in 1539 and 1540, containing 43 and 46 compositions, respectively. All madrigals in both volumes are for four voices. In addition to these publications, six of his madrigals appear in anthologies.

Some of his madrigals may have been written as early as the 1520s, although it is not known which of them are earliest, or even if those earliest have survived and been included in the 1539-40 printed editions. If they have, they would be among the earliest madrigals to be written outside of Florence and Rome, establishing Ferrara as another center of early madrigal composition, both of music and verse.

Dalla Viola's madrigal settings conform closely to the form of the texts, most of which are ballate, and the musical texture is usually homophonic, with chordal rather than imitative or solo openings to his madrigals. Some of his music is surprisingly chromatic, predating Rore by more than a decade, and his lines are attentive to text expression, and contain occasional word- or phrase-painting.

While most of Dalla Viola's music for the plays at the Ferrara court, including incidental music for Giraldi Cinzio's Orbecche (1541), Agostino Beccari's Il sacrificio (1554) (excepting one fragment), Alberto Lollio's Aretusa (1563), and Agostino Argenti's Lo sfortunato (1567), has been lost, some characteristics of this lost music have been inferred. Most of the music consisted of interpolated choruses, probably homophonic, within the acts, and the plays also would have included madrigals performed before and after the play, often on moralizing texts related to the action (the plays were tragedies and pastorals – in fact, Il sacrificio was labeled by Einstein as the earliest pastoral known to literature). In that the music consisted of choruses and occasional madrigals, they resembled the work of Corteccia in Florence.
