= Giovanni Priuli =

Venetian composer and organist

Giovanni Priuli (or Prioli, ca. 1575–1626) was a Venetian composer and organist of the late Renaissance and early Baroque periods. A late member of the Venetian School, and a contemporary of Claudio Monteverdi, he was a prominent musician in Venice in the first decade of the 17th century, departing after the death of his associate Giovanni Gabrieli and ending his career at the Habsburg court in Austria. His music straddled the dividing-line between Renaissance and Baroque idioms.

== Life ==
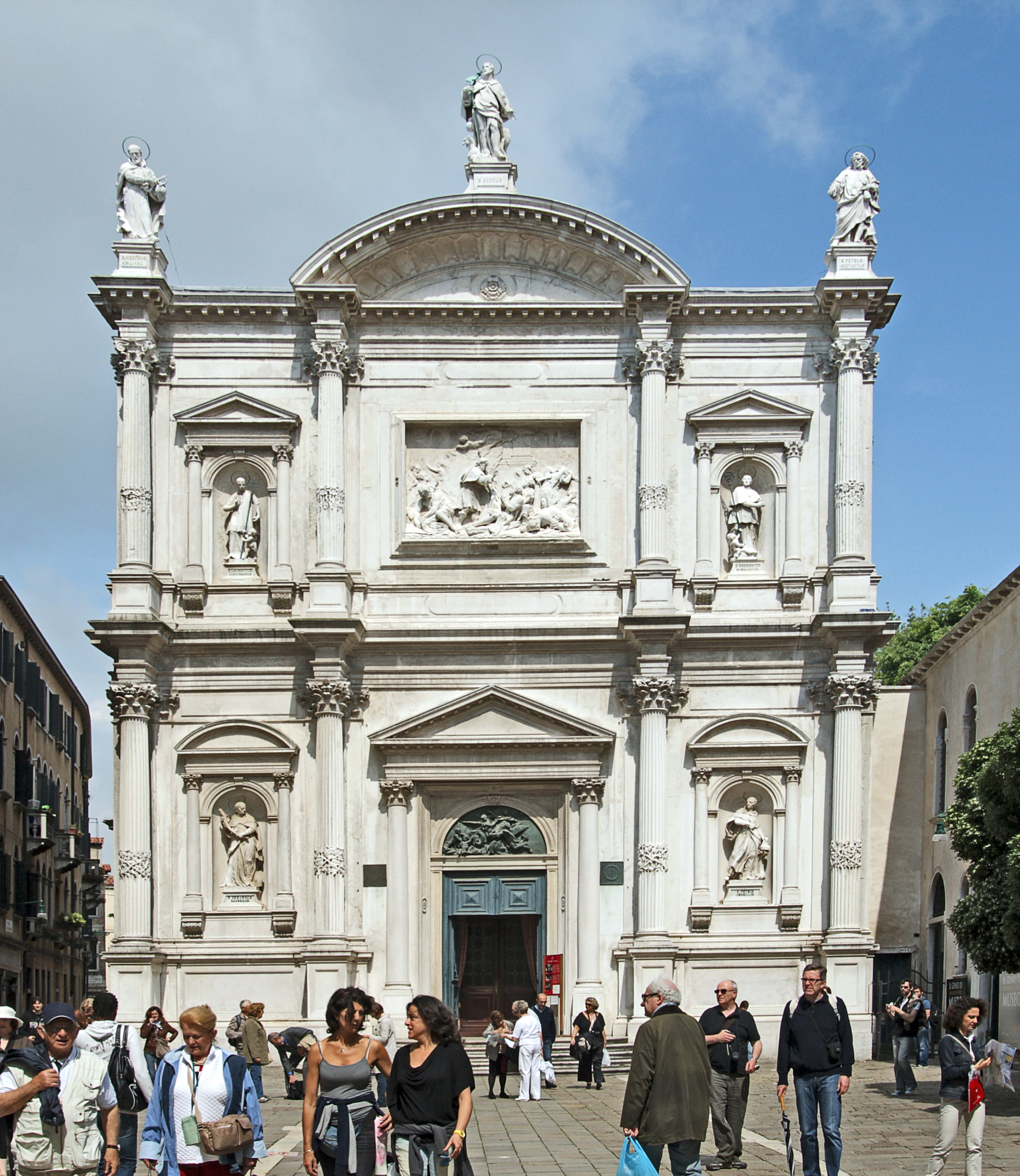
Façade of the Chiesa di San Rocco, in Venice. Priuli worked here and in the adjacent Scuola Grande from 1609 until at least 1612.

Little is known of Priuli's early life except that he was born in Venice around 1575. Information about the first twenty-five years of his life is lacking. Beginning in 1600, he was a close associate of Gabrieli, and it is presumed he may have been his student; the two were associated for the duration of Priuli's Venetian career. When Priuli is first mentioned in the records of St. Mark's, he was already an experienced musician, being hired as assistant organist to Gabrieli on several occasions between 1600 and 1605. In May 1607 he received a more permanent position as deputy organist; prior to that, the payment records indicated that his hires were for single engagements. Since St. Mark's had two regular organists, the deputy filled in for special occasions, and also when one of the two principal organists was either traveling or ill. The first organist through most of the period was Paolo Giusto, while Gabrieli was second organist.

In addition to his duties at St. Mark's, the most prestigious musical establishment in Venice, Priuli worked as an organist at the Scuola Grande di San Rocco, a confraternity whose musical opulence was second only to that of St. Mark's. Dates for his employment at San Rocco commence in 1609, and while it is not known if his employment was continuous for the next several years, he oversaw the musical events surrounding the feast of Saint Roch, the patron saint of the confraternity, which took place on 16 August 1612, only four days after the death of Gabrieli.

Sometime around 1614 or 1615 he left Venice to pursue a career at the Habsburg court in Austria. He became Hofkapellmeister to Archduke Ferdinand (1619); on Ferdinand's accession to the imperial throne he went with him to Vienna to serve as Hofkapellmeister there. He died in Neunkirchen in Lower Austria.

== Music ==
Priuli wrote both sacred and secular music, in both conservative and progressive styles, including the Venetian polychoral style; he was one of the composers who imported it to German-speaking lands. His music includes a cappella vocal music, voices with instruments, and some purely instrumental music. From the publication dates of his collections, he seems to have composed most of his sacred music and instrumental music in the service of the Habsburgs, and likely wrote much of his secular music – particularly the Italian madrigals, as might be expected – while he was in Venice.

His madrigals, which include probably the earliest part of his output, are significant in that they show the change from the Renaissance prima prattica style of balanced a cappella vocal polyphony in the first two books to the Baroque concertato and monodic styles in the third. In this third book, he includes music that can be performed either by voices only, or voices and instruments; and he also includes a basso continuo, which evolves from a mere duplication of the bass line in some of the pieces, to an independent part over which solos, duets, and other ensembles perform, often in an antiphonal style.

Priuli's sacred music includes masses, motets, and sacred monodies. His masses include examples in the already archaic stile antico of the 16th century, akin to the music of Palestrina, as well as others in the developing stile concertato which helped define the beginning of the Baroque era. His motets and monodies are in general more progressive, having features in common with other early Baroque composers influenced by the Venetians.

Priuli's instrumental music, such as the pieces in the two collections entitled Sacrorum concentuum, 1618 and 1619, is akin to the music of Gabrieli. The number of parts ranges from five to twelve; some of the pieces use echo effects reminiscent of the repertory of the composers working in St. Mark's, where that style first developed. All of these works were intended for use in church.

== References and further reading ==
- Jerome Roche/Steven Saunders, "Giovanni Priuli", Grove Music Online, ed. L. Macy (Accessed May 19, 2008), (subscription access)
- Giulio Ongaro/Eleanor Selfridge-Field, "Venice", Grove Music Online, ed. L. Macy (Accessed May 19, 2008), (subscription access)
- James Haar, Anthony Newcomb, Massimo Ossi, Glenn Watkins, Nigel Fortune, Joseph Kerman, Jerome Roche: "Madrigal", Grove Music Online, ed. L. Macy (Accessed May 19, 2008), (subscription access)
- James Haar, Anthony Newcomb, Glenn Watkins, Nigel Fortune, Joseph Kerman, Jerome Roche: "Madrigal", in The New Grove Dictionary of Music and Musicians, ed. Stanley Sadie. 20 vol. London, Macmillan Publishers Ltd., 1980. ISBN 1-56159-174-2
- Allan W. Atlas, Renaissance Music: Music in Western Europe, 1400–1600. New York, W.W. Norton & Co., 1998. ISBN 0-393-97169-4
- Gustave Reese, Music in the Renaissance. New York, W.W. Norton & Co., 1954. ISBN 0-393-09530-4
- Alfred Einstein, The Italian Madrigal. Three volumes. Princeton, New Jersey, Princeton University Press, 1949. ISBN 0-691-09112-9
- Giovanni Priuli, "Instrumentalkanzonen" [2 volumes]. Herausgegeben von Ernst Hilmar. Graz : Akademische Druck- u. Verlagsanstalt, 1970
