= Giovanni Battista Bianchi (composer, flourished 1780–1782) =

Italian composer and conductor

Giovanni Battista Bianchi (fl. 1780 – c. 1782) was an Italian composer and conductor of the Classical period.

== Life and career ==
Nothing is known about his birth or early life in Italy. The first extant record of Bianchi is when he succeeded Ferdinando Bertoni as music director of the King’s Theatre, London in 1780. He remained in that position for two seasons during which, he composed several opera arias utilized within pastiches staged at that theatre from 1780 through 1782. He also co-wrote the music to the opera L’omaggio di paesani al signore de contado, a festa teatrale with Tommaso Giordani and Venanzio Rauzzini. This work was premiered at the King’s Theatre on 5 June 1781 in celebration of George III's birthday with the king in attendance. Nothing is known about Bianchi after he left the King's Theatre at the conclusion of the 1781-1782 season.

Bianchi should not be confused with the earlier Baroque period composer Giovanni Battista Bianchi (composer, flourished 1675), who was active in Italy or with Giovanni Bianchi (composer, born c. 1660). He should also not be confused with Francesco Bianchi; a mistake made in some published scholarship.
