= Giuseppe Caruso (composer) =

Italian Baroque composer and organist

Giuseppe Caruso (fl. 1634) was an Italian composer and organist of the Baroque period.

== Scholarship ==
Little is known about Giuseppe Caruso. In 1634, he was working for Don Antonio Statella e Caruso, a Sicilian Officer of State who held the title of Great Seneschal and was also a member of the Sicilian nobility with the title Marquis of Spaccaforno. He was an organist and composer in the marquis's employ. His only surviving work from which these details come, the six part choral work Sacre lodi del SS.mo sacramento concertate, op.2, was published in Naples in 1634. This manuscript indicates that an earlier anthology of madrigals by Caruso was previously published, but this has not survived. Nothing else is known about this composer.
