= Giovanni Bianchi (composer, born c. 1660) =

Italian composer and violinist

Giovanni Bianchi (born c. 1660 – died after 1720) was an Italian composer and violinist of the Baroque period. He is best known as a composer of sonatas. He should not be confused with the composers Giovanni Battista Bianchi (composer, flourished 1780–1782) or Giovanni Battista Bianchi (composer, flourished 1675).

== Life and career ==
Giovanni Bianchi was born in Ferrara, Italy about 1660. Not much is known about his life. Sometime in his early life, he moved to the city of Milan. His first published composition, Opus 1, was published in Modena in 1697 and consisted of a collection of twelve sonatas. In this work, he was described as a Milanese violinist. Both he and his son, Giuseppe Bianchi, were named as instrumentalists at the Royal Palace of Milan in 1711 and 1720. After this, his activities are not known.

Bianchi's style as a composer has marked similarities to Carlo Antonio Marino and Arcangelo Corelli. His Opus 2 was published in Amsterdam, in 1703 and consisted of six concerti di chiesa and six more sonatas. Other music attributed to him was published by the New York Public Library in Three Centuries of Music in Scores, ii: Concerto I: Italy (c1703–1750) (1988). Twelve additional sonatas attributed to him are held in the Berlin State Library, and two arias attributed to him are in the collection of the Gesellschaft der Musikfreunde in Vienna.
