= Cesarina Ricci de Tingoli =

Italian composer (fl. 1573)

Cesarina Ricci de Tingoli (born 1573 - fl. 1597) was an Italian composer of the Baroque period. She published a book of twenty madrigals in 1597, dedicated to Cardinal Cinzio Aldobrandini, which survives as two partbooks and a manuscript tablature. The book contains two madrigals by Alberto Ghirlinzoni, and has texts by Torquato Tasso, Giovanni Battista Guarini, and Antonio Ongaro.

== Life and career ==
Ricci was born circa 1573 in Cingoli, near Ancona. She was related to the family of Cardinal Giovanni Ricci (1497–1574) by birth, and the noble family of Tingoli by marriage. Ruggiero Giovannelli might have been her teacher, as evidenced by similarities of style in her compositions.

Ricci published Il Primo libro de madrigali a cinque voci, con un dialogo a otto novamente composti & dati in luce in Venice in 1597, which is a composition known as a madrigal. This collection includes 20 madrigals, and is dedicated to Monsignore il Cardinale San Giorgio, the Cardinal Cinzio Aldobrandini. It survives in two partbooks and a manuscript tablature also survives. The cantus and quintus partbooks do not survive. Il primo libro contains 14 five-voice madrigals and an eight-voice dialogue by Ricci, and two madrigals by Alberto Ghirlinzoni, who is only known from this publication. The texts are by Torquato Tasso, Giovanni Battista Guarini, and Antonio Ongaro, all of whom were associated with the academy of Cardinal Cinzio Aldobrandini.

Yale University's Beinecke Rare Book & Manuscript Library acquired a first edition of her work in 2002. A group of Cantabrigian singers called the Ricci Ensemble perform reconstructed versions of madrigals including those composed by Ricci.
