= Giovanni Pietro Berti =

Italian composer and organist

- Born: 1590
- Died: 1638 aged 47/48)
- Occupations: Music Composer; Organist

Giovanni Pietro Berti (c. 1590–1638) was an Italian composer and organist of Saint Mark's, Venice. He was active in the first half of the century. Berti had a tenor part in the musical chapel of the Church of San Marco in Venice, when he entered the contest to fill the vacant spot of second organist - which was vacant because of the death of P. Giusti. He managed to win, beating F. Usper, Picchi G. and GB Locatelli.

His works include Cantate et arie (2 vols., Venice, 1624, 1627)
