= Francesco dalla Viola =

Italian composer

Francesco dalla Viola (died 1568) was a 16th-century choirmaster and composer.

== Biography ==
Francesco was a singer under the direction of Adrian Willaert between the years 1522 and 1526. Francesco was the choirmaster at Modena from about 1530. Around 1558 he became choirmaster and musician to Prince Alfonso d'Este at Ferrera, replacing Cipriano de Rore. While at Ferrera, he travelled with Gioseffo Zarlino and Claudio Merulo to visit Adrian Willaert who was housebound. He died in 1568.

== Compositions ==
Francesco Viola produced a set of his own madrigals in 1550. Later in 1559 Francesco edited some works by Willaert at the behest of d'Este.

Viola's compositional style is closely related to that of Willaert's, particularly in relation to parallel major thirds over positions IV and V, where the juxtaposition of such is generally avoided. However, Viola's compositions are lighter in tone than Willaert's heavier madrigals.
