= La Dafne =

Opera from Marco de Gagliano

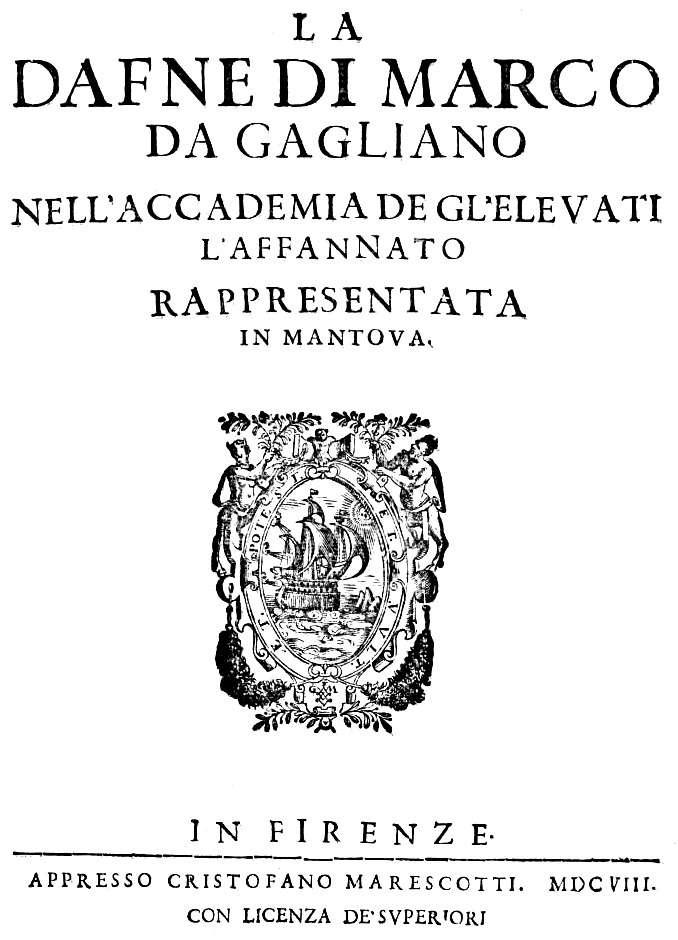
La Dafne, Gagliano's score from 1608

La Dafne (Daphne) is an early Italian opera, written in 1608 by the Italian composer Marco da Gagliano from a libretto by Ottavio Rinuccini. It is described as a favola in musica (fable set to music) composed in one act and a prologue. The opera is based on the myth of Daphne and Apollo as related by Ovid in the first book of the Metamorphoses. An earlier version of the libretto had been set to music in 1597–98 by Jacopo Peri, whose Dafne is generally considered to be the first opera.

== History ==
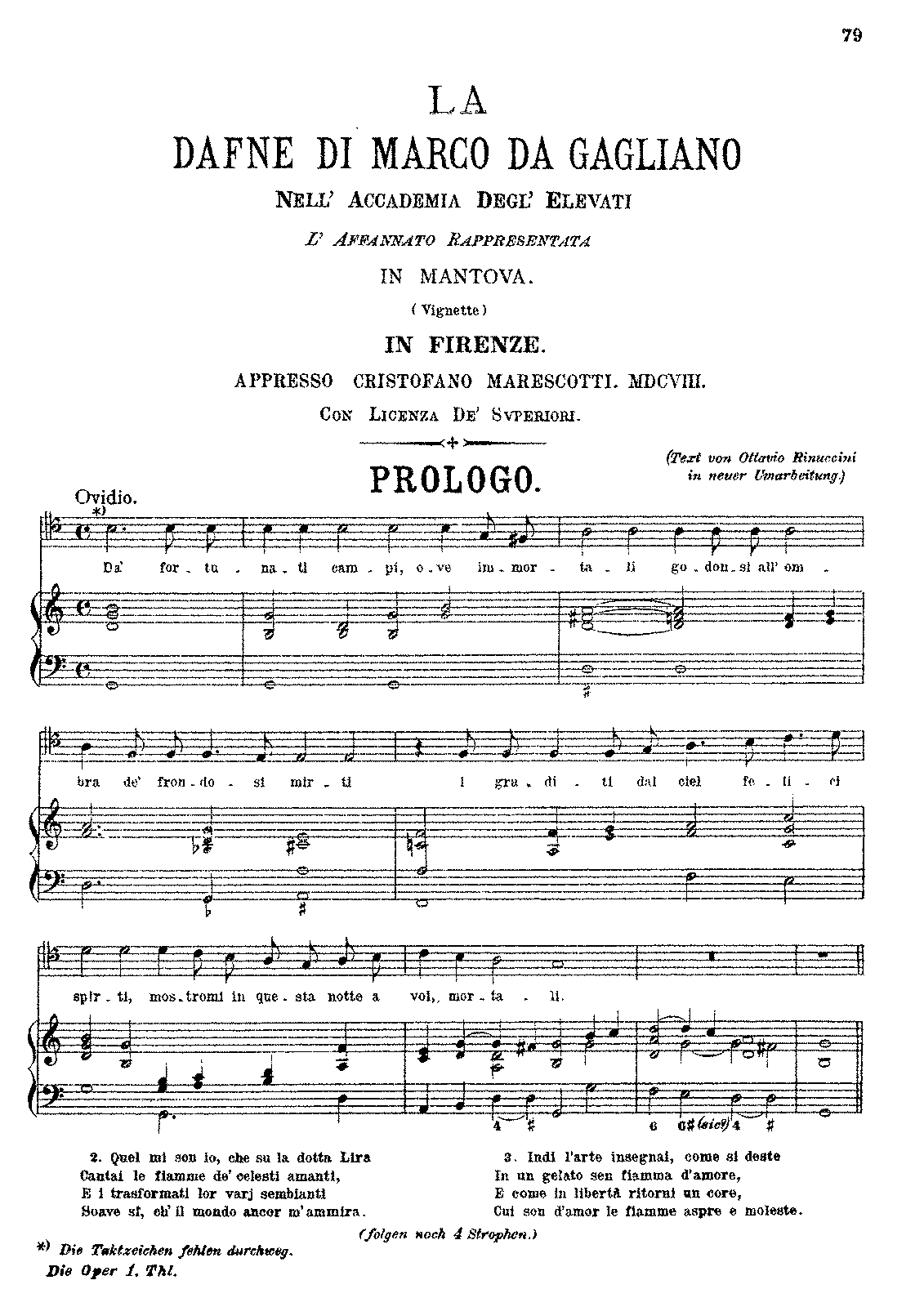
Prologue

Gagliano's opera was first performed at the Ducal Palace, Mantua in late February 1608. It had originally been intended to form part of the wedding celebrations of Prince Francesco Gonzaga of Mantua and Margherita of Savoy, but the arrival of the bride was delayed and the staging was brought forward (Monteverdi's opera L'Arianna was also written for the marriage but not performed until May). A private performance of Dafne was given in Florence at the house of Don Giovanni de' Medici on 9 February 1611. The Medici were the patrons of the Florentine Gagliano and the laurel (into which the heroine of the opera is transformed) was their symbol.

The text of Rinuccini's Dafne was originally set by composer Jacopo Peri during the Carnival of 1597 at the Palazzo Corsi, the home of the wealthy merchant and co-composer Jacopo Corsi. This score, while almost entirely lost save six musical excerpts, is marked as the first piece in the lexicon of what is now known as opera today. Of this composition, Rinuccini is quoted as saying "Dafne, written by me only to show in a simple experiment, una semplice prova, what music could do in our age, was set to music so gracefully by Peri that it pleased incredibly those few who heard it."Dafne was originally set as an experiment that derived out of conversations by a group called the Florentine Camerata. The men of the Florentine Camerata sought to revive the classic Greek dramas under the hypothesis that all text was originally sung. From these experiments, stile recitativo, a style of singing that mimics speech, was created.

The Camerata was headed by Count Giovanni de' Bardi and was composed of humanists, musicians, and intellectuals. Luca Bati, a composer and music teacher was also a member of this group and the teacher of Marco da Gagliano. While it is not officially stated by Gagliano whether or not he was present for the first incarnation of Dafne in 1597 by Jacopo Peri, it is known that he was a rising composition student in Florence at the time with strong connections to the Camerata just years before he completed his own setting of Dafne.

== Composition Techniques ==
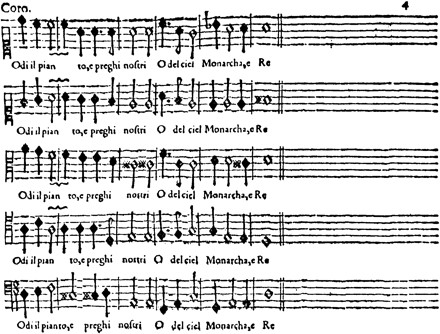
opening scene, five-part chorus

The score of the opera was printed in Florence on 20 October 1608. Gagliano utilizes techniques of both the old intermedi style and of fledgling opera style throughout, including a detailed preface with his personal performance suggestions. It contains detailed instructions on how to perform the work. Among other things, Gagliano recommends clearly separating the soloists from the chorus, positioning the orchestra in front of the stage so the singers can see them properly, and having a second actor to play Apollo in the combat scene with the Python in case the singer should be out of breath for the big aria which follows. Gagliano also indicates that the instruments voiced in the choral sections and ritornellos should play prior to the start of the opera, though no overture is actually written.

The text is 445 lines in total. While short, it offers heightened emotions and dramatic opportunities, including the eight stanza chorus that celebrates the nymph's flight from Apollo's attack called, ‘Bella ninfa fugitive.’ Typical of composition techniques at the birth of Italian opera, Gagliano set Rinuccini's text of Dafne with homophonic choruses intertwined with intermittent choral polyphony. His homophonic choruses, though lacking in a unified textual theme, did provide textual clarity, highlighting the importance of comprehensible singing, especially when setting moral text. This is typified in the opening scene of Dafne through a five-part chorus of the text “Hear our plaint and prayer, O Monarch and King of Heaven.” The chorus is a prominent figure throughout the composition, at times adding to the action of the story and at other times, providing reflective commentary.

== Roles ==
Role	Voice type	Premiere cast
Dafne (Daphne)	soprano	Caterina Martinelli
Apollo	tenor	Francesco Rasi
Venere (Venus)	soprano	
Amore (Cupid)	soprano	Caterina Martinelli
Ovidio (Ovid)	tenor	
Tirsi (Thyrsis)	contralto castrato	Antonio Brandi

== Synopsis ==
The prologue is delivered by the poet Ovid as he sings the text:

"Da' fortunati campi, ove immortali
godonsi all'ombra de' frondosi mirti
i graditi dal ciel felici spirti,
mostromi in questa notte a voi mortali.
Quel mi son io, che su la dotta lira
cantai le fiamme celesti de' celesti amanti
e i trasformati lor vari sembianti
soave sì, ch'il mondo ancor m'ammira."

When the opera proper begins, the god Apollo slays the Python, a monster which has been terrifying the Greek island of Delos. Cupid and Venus are unimpressed by Apollo's boasting and about his conquest and his feelings of being invincible. Because of this, they plot revenge on Apollo.

Cupid shoots two arrows, the first of which makes Apollo fall in love with the nymph Daphne, daughter of the river god. The second arrow causes the object of his desire to flee from him. As Daphne rejects his advances, she calls out to her mother for help and is turned into a laurel tree to avoid his love. Still in love with Daphne, Apollo makes the laurel the emblem of his love forever and a sign of victory and award throughout ancient Greece.

== Recitatives, Arias, and Choruses ==
Prologue and Act 1

1. "Prologo; Da' fortunati campi" (Ovidio)
2. "Scena prima Tra queste ombre segrete" (Pastore I+II/Ninfa I/Tirsi/Coro/Ninfa II)
3. "Ohimè! che veggio" (Coro)
4. "Pur giaque estinto al fine" (Apollo)
5. "Almo Dio, che'l carro ardente" (Coro/Ninfe/Tirsi/Pastori)
6. "Scena seconda Che tu vadia cercando" (Amore/Apollo/Venere)
7. "Nudo, Arcier, che l'arco tendi" (Coro)
8. "Scena terza Per queste piante ombrose" (Dafne/Pastore I/II)
9. "Ogni ninfa in doglie e'n pianti" (Coro)
10. "Deh come lieto in questo piagge torno" (Apollo/Dafne/Pastore IITirsi/Amore/Pastore I)
11. "Una al pianto in abbandono" (Coro)
12. "Scena quarta Qual d'ei mortali o d'ei celesti" (Amore/Venere)
13. "Non si nasconde in selva" (Coro)
14. "Scena quinta Qual nuova meraviglia" (Tirsi/Pastore I/II)
15. "Piangete Ninfe" (Ninfa I)
16. "Sparse più non vedrem di quel fin' oro" (Pastore I/II)
17. "Piangete, Ninfe" (Coro/Pastore I)
18. "Scena sesta Ma, vedete lui stesso" (Tirsi/Apollo)
19. "Ballo Bella Ninfa fuggitiva" (Coro/Amore/Venere/Apollo/Ninfa I+II/Pastore I)

== Recordings ==
- 1975 - Musica Pacifica, conducted by Paul Vorwerk, with Robert White, Mauritia Thornburg, Su Harrison, Mary Rawcliffe, Susan Judy, Anne Turner (sop), Dale Terbeek (ct), Hayden Blanchard, Jonathan Mack (ten), Myron Myers (b); (ABC Command, Quadraphonic)
- 1977 - Monteverdi-Chor Hamburg, Camerata Academica Hamburg, conducted by Jürgen Jürgens, with Norma Lerer, Barbara Schlick, Ine Kollecker, Nigel Rogers, Ian Partridge, David Thomas, Berthold Possemeyer; (Deutsche Grammophon Archiv)
- 1984 - Apollo Ensemble, directed by Roger Glanville-Hicks, with Gerald English, Victoria Watson, Jeannie Marsh. Digitally recorded by 3MBS-FM, Melbourne, Australia
- 1995 - Ensemble Elyma, conducted by Gabriel Garrido, with María Cristina Kiehr, Roberta Invernizzi, Adriana Fernandez, Jordi Ricart, Achim Schulz Anderson, Furio Zanasi. Studio di Musica Antica Antonio Il Verso, Palermo; (K617)
- 2008 - Ensemble Fuoco E Cenere, conducted by Jay Bernfeld, with Chantal Santon, Guillemette Laurens, Daphné Touchais, Mathieu Abelli; (Arion)
