= Vittoria Archilei =

Italian singer, dancer, and lutenist

Vittoria Archilei (La Romanina) (fl. 1582 – 1620) was an Italian soprano, dancer, and lutenist. She became one of the most famous singers of her time, singing at many court entertainments, and was in the service of the Medici for her entire career. Composers including her husband, Sebastian Raval and Luca Marenzio wrote for her.

== Life ==
She was born Vittoria Concarini, but in 1582 married Antonio Archilei, a composer and lutenist. She was probably his pupil. She was in the service of Ferdinando I de' Medici, Grand Duke of Tuscany, along with Emilio de' Cavalieri, who was her mentor. In 1588 she went with her husband and Cavalieri to the Medici court in Florence, where she became "one of the most famous singers of her time" (Grove). She is recorded as singing at many court entertainments and weddings up until 1620, and was in the service of the Medici her whole career. Many composers wrote for her, including Sebastian Raval and Luca Marenzio, as well as, of course, her husband and Cavalieri.

In 1589 Archilei starred in the play La pellegrina which premiered in celebration of the marriage of Christina of Lorraine. She starred in Emilio de' Cavalieri's opera Disperazione di Fileno.

Giulio Caccini and Jacopo Peri claimed that she had sung their music, in order to help their claims to supremacy in composition, as well as to being the best writers in the seconda prattica style. Sigismondo d'India also wrote of her skill in singing. She apparently sang in the new style, including many ornaments and passaggi. She sang with Francesca Caccini and Settimia Caccini in an imitation of the concerto delle donne in Florence for a period. Cohen reports that she sang until 1610, when Adriana Basile began to overshadow her. Hitchcock and Carter report her last known performance appears to be 1620; her date of death is unknown.
