= Virginia Ramponi-Andreini =

Italian opera singer

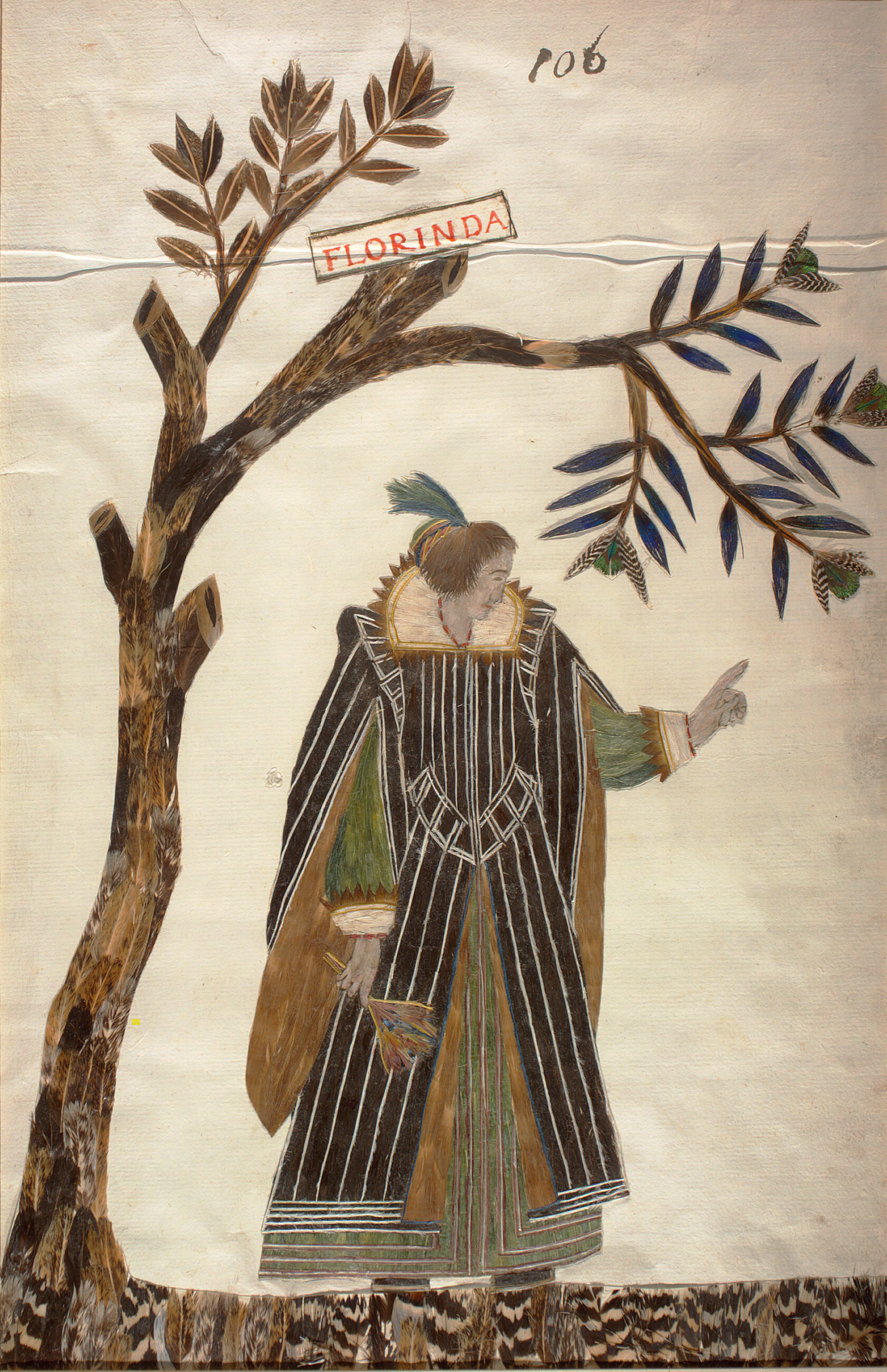
Virginia Ramponi-Andreini depicted in The Feather Book of Dionisio Minaggio, 1618

Virginia Ramponi-Andreini, also known by her stage name "La Florinda" (1 January 1583 – c.1630) was an Italian actress and singer. She was known for her performances in commedia dell'arte plays, many of them written for her by her husband Giambattista Andreini, and for having created the title role in Claudio Monteverdi's lost opera L'Arianna. She was born in Northern Italy in either Milan or Genoa. The exact date and place of her death are unknown.

== Early life: becoming "La Florinda" ==
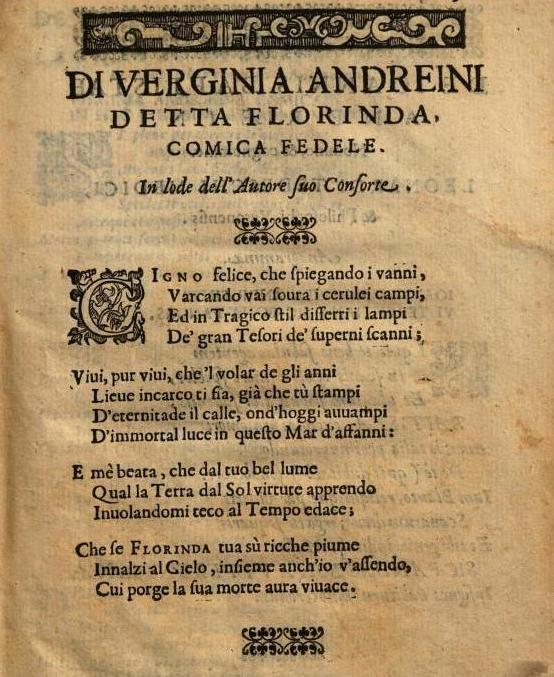
Poem by Virginia Ramponi-Andreini in praise of her husband, published in the 1606 edition of his play La Florinda

Born Virginia Andrea Ramponi, she has been described by her contemporaries in poems and letters as originating from either Milan or Genoa, depending on the source. The first secondary source to record her life in any detail was an entry in Francesco Bartoli's two-volume biographical dictionary of Italian actors, Notizie istoriche de comici italiani, published in 1781. Little is known about her life prior to her marriage in 1601 to the Florentine actor and playwright Giambattista Andreini, the point at which her entry in Bartoli's dictionary begins.

Both Virginia and Giambattista Andreini had been actors in I Gelosi, a commedia dell'arte troupe managed by his parents, Isabella and Francesco Andreini. However, soon after their marriage, Gianmbattista formed his own troupe, I Fedeli (The Faithful), with Virginia performing in the prima donna inamorata roles and helping to manage the troupe. He also began writing his own plays. The first one was a tragedy entitled La Florinda. Virginia played the title role when it was performed in 1603 for the Accademia dei Spensierati (a learned society in Florence). The play received much praise and was published the following year, but there were so many misprints that Giambattista had all 500 copies destroyed. The first surviving copy of La Florinda is the 1606 edition, published in Milan, where the Fedeli performed it for the city's Governor, Pedro Henriquez de Acevedo. It contains several poems written by members of the Spensierati in praise of the play, its author, and its leading lady, as well as a poem by Virginia in praise of her husband. The play became very successful over the years and was performed in both Northern Italian and French cities. In the 1606 edition, she was listed as "Verginia [sic] Andreini, detta Florinda" ("Virginia Andreini, called Florinda"). However, according to musicologist Emily Wilbourne, it is unclear which came first—Virginia's stage name or the play which first brought her to public prominence. Giambattista went on to write several other commedia dell'arte plays in which she performed a character named Florinda, including: Lo Schiavetto (The Slave Boy) 1612, La Turca (The Turkish Woman) 1616, Lelio Bandito (Lelio Banished) 1620, and Amor nello specchio (Love in the Mirror) 1622.

== L'Arianna ==
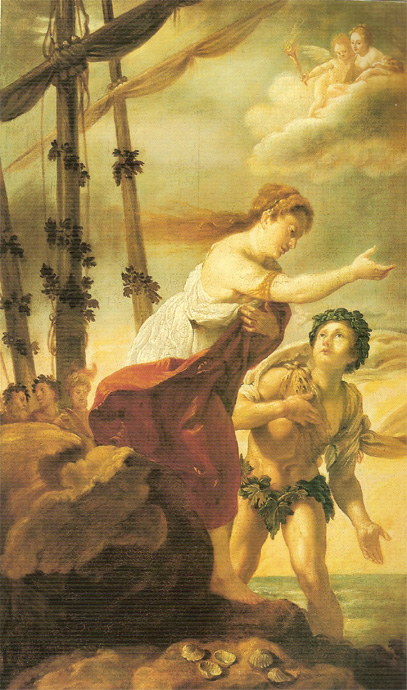
Ariadne and Bacchus on the Isle of Naxos by Domenico Fetti

By 1605 the Andreini's and the Fedeli troupe had become an integral part of the performers, artists, and composers assembled by Vincenzo Gonzaga, Duke of Mantua at his court, an association which was to lead to the performance that brought "La Florinda" lasting fame. Preparations were begun in 1607 for an elaborate set of festivities and performances which were to take place at the Mantua court in May 1608 to celebrate the marriage of Margaret of Savoy to Vincenzo Gonzaga's son and heir Francesco. Virginia Ramponi-Andreini and the Fedeli troupe were engaged to perform the centerpiece of the festivities, Guarini's play L'idropica, which had a prologue and four elaborate intermedi by several composers, including Claudio Monteverdi and Salamone Rossi. Monteverdi was also commissioned to compose an opera for the occasion, L'Arianna, based on the Greek myth of Ariadne's abandonment by Theseus on the island of Naxos and her subsequent marriage to Bacchus.

The young soprano Caterina Martinelli had been engaged to sing the role of Arianna (Ariadne). However, she fell gravely ill with smallpox in late February 1608 and died in early March. In the meantime, searches began to find a replacement. The Florentine singer Margherita Romana and the Neapolitan Ippolita Recupita (a singer in Cardinal Montalto's service) were deemed unsatisfactory. A third singer from Bergamo, whom Monteverdi had suggested, refused to come to Mantua. The role then fell to Ramponi-Andreini, who was already in Mantua and had been praised for her singing of the lament in La Florinda. According to an account by the Mantuan courtier, Antonio Costantini, she learned her role by heart in only six days and at the rehearsal on the night of 14 March "sang it with such grace and manner of affect" that all present were amazed.

L'Arianna premiered on 28 May 1608 to great acclaim both for the composer and Ramponi-Andreini, particularly her singing of "Arianna's Lament", the only piece from the opera whose score has survived. The lament, which musicologist Tim Carter posits was probably added to the opera after she had taken over the role to exploit her talents as a singing-actress, made such an impression that copies of it began to be privately circulated as chamber music. Years later, the poet Giambattista Marino, who had attended the Mantua performance, paid tribute to her performance of it in Canto VII of his epic L'Adone. After comparing her beauty and voice to that of the renowned singer Adriana Basile, he wrote:

Thus, O Mantua, did you hear Florinda
There in the theatres beneath your royal roofs,
Expressing Ariadne's harsh sufferings
And drawing from a thousand hearts a thousand sighs.

In his book on 16th and 17th-century commedia dell'arte actors, Attori mercanti corsari (1993), Siro Ferrone proposed that Domenico Fetti's 1611 painting Ariadne and Bacchus on the Isle of Naxos was also a tribute to the Arianna premiere and that the Ariadne in the painting is a depiction of Ramponi-Andreini herself. Her participation in the wedding festivities in Mantua did not end with Arianna. On 4 June, she also appeared in Monteverdi's Il ballo delle ingrate (The Dance of the Ungrateful Women) singing a lament as the ungrateful women return to the Underworld.

== Later life ==
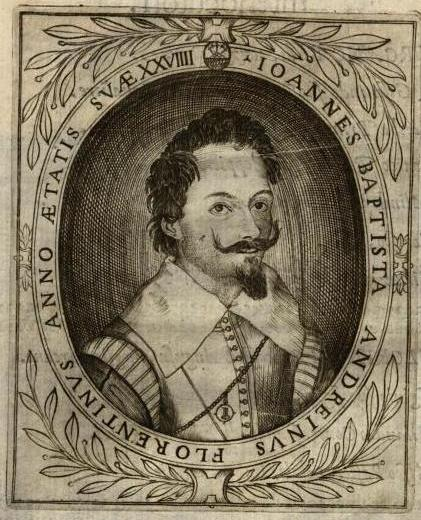
Giambattista Andreini depicted at age 29

After Arianna, the Fedeli remained in the service of Vincenzo Gonzaga and that of his successors for over 20 years, forming a particularly close relationship with Vincenzo's son Ferdinando. Virginia and Giambattista Andreini had been made citizens of the Duchy of Mantua, which allowed them to own property there, and although they used the city as their home base, the troupe often performed in other cities, sometimes independently and other times "on loan" from the Gonzaga court for festivities at other Italian courts. In Milan, Virginia continued to perform for the Governor, Pedro Henriquez de Acevedo, and became a particular favourite of his. Virginia and Giambattista's only child, a son, was born in Milan on 30 June 1609. He was named Pietro Enrico in honour of the Governor who held the child at his baptism on 9 July in the Basilica San Nazaro in Brolo.

In 1613, Virginia, Giambattista, and the Fedeli began what would prove to be the first of several tours outside Italy. On this occasion, they performed in Lyon, Fontainebleau, and Paris at the invitation of Maria de' Medici. They remained in France until 1614 and returned there several more times between 1621 and 1625. It was during the troupe's second visit to France that a scandal broke out when the Andreini's arch-rivals, Pier Maria Cecchini ("Fritellino") and his wife, Orsola ("Flaminia",) publicly revealed that Giambattista had long been having an affair with another actress in the troupe, Virginia Rotari. The ménage à trois was to continue for the remainder of the Andreini's marriage with both women continuing to perform with the Fedeli. The troupe travelled to Prague in 1627 where they had been sent by the Mantua court to perform in the celebrations surrounding the coronation of Ferdinand III as King of Bohemia. (Ferdinand III's step-mother at the time was Eleonora Gonzaga, the youngest daughter of Vincenzo Gonzaga.) They remained in Prague until 1628 and then moved with the Habsburg court to Vienna before returning to Italy in 1629.

The date and circumstances of Ramponi-Andreini's death are not certain. In her husband's existing letters, she is mentioned as still being alive in September 1629. Her death was then mentioned by him (without giving a date) in a letter sent on 17 September 1631 to Charles Gonzaga, Duke of Nevers. In his poem L'Olivastro, written in 1642, he described her as having died from a "long illness". It has been assumed by several historians that she probably died in Italy between 1630 and 1631 when the plague was rampant both in Mantua and in Bologna where Giambattista is known to have been living at the time. Soon after her death, Giambattista married his lover Virginia Rotari.
