= L'Arianna =

Opera by Claudio Monteverdi

- Opera by Claudio Monteverdi
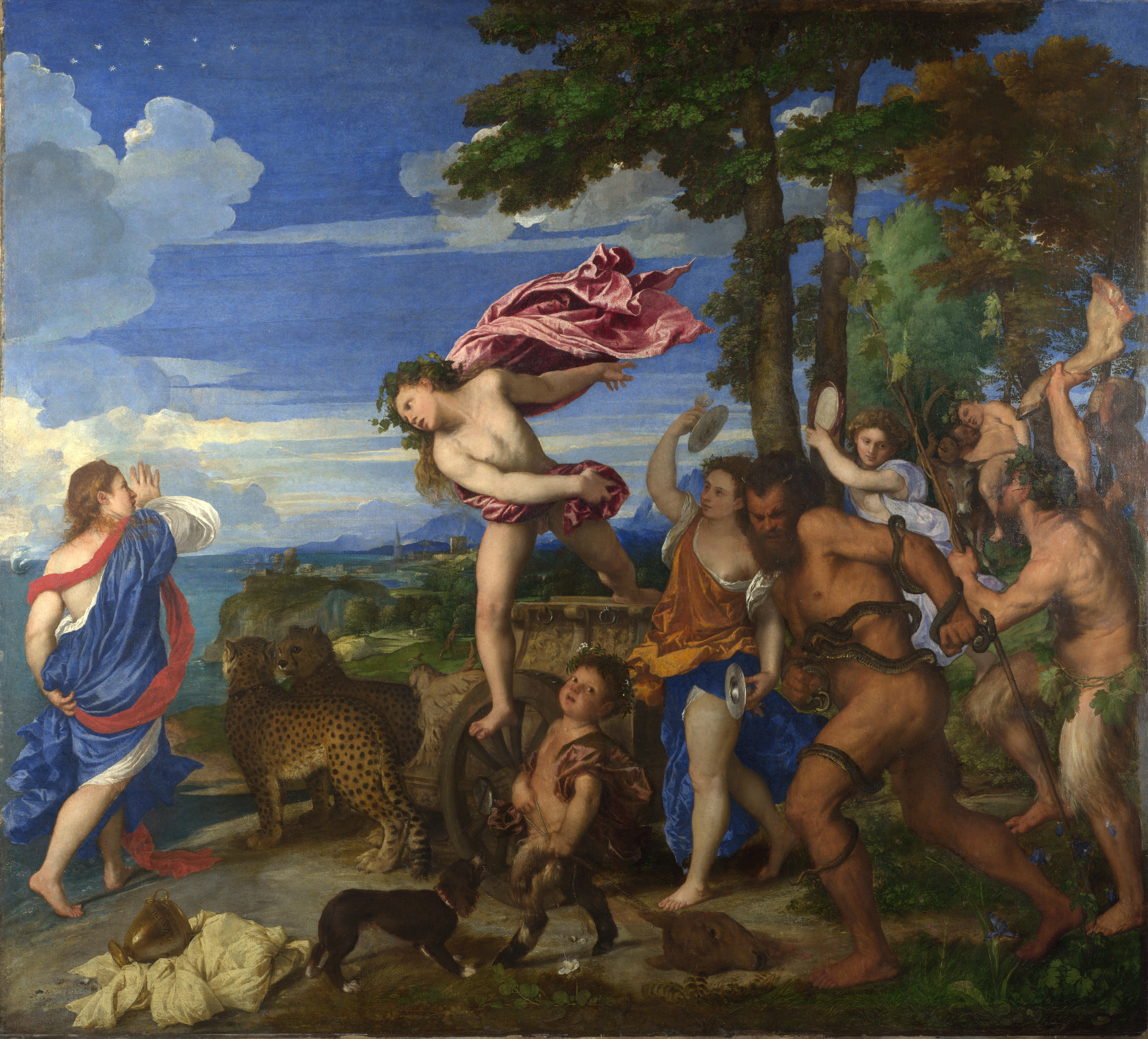
- Titian's depiction, painted 1520–23, of Bacchus's arrival on Naxos. This scene forms the climax of the opera.
- Librettist: Ottavio Rinuccini
- Language: Italian
- Based on: Ariadne's abandonment by Theseus
- Premiere: 28 May 1608; Mantua

L'Arianna (SV 291, Ariadne) is the lost second opera by Italian composer Claudio Monteverdi. One of the earliest operas in general, it was composed in 1607–1608 and first performed on 28 May 1608, as part of the musical festivities for a royal wedding at the court of Duke Vincenzo I Gonzaga in Mantua. All the music is lost apart from the extended recitative known as "Lamento d'Arianna" ("Ariadne's Lament"). The libretto, which survives complete, was written in eight scenes by Ottavio Rinuccini, who used Ovid's Heroides and other classical sources to relate the story of Ariadne's abandonment by Theseus on the island of Naxos and her subsequent elevation as bride to the god Bacchus.

The opera was composed under severe pressure of time; the composer later said that the effort of creating it almost killed him. The initial performance, produced with lavish and innovative special effects, was highly praised, and the work was equally well received in Venice when it was revived under the composer's direction in 1640 as the inaugural work for the Teatro San Moisè.

Rinuccini's libretto is available in a number of editions. The music of the "Lamento" survives because it was published by Monteverdi, in several different versions, independently from the opera. This fragment became a highly influential musical work and was widely imitated; the "expressive lament" became an integral feature of Italian opera for much of the 17th century. In recent years the "Lamento" has become popular as a concert and recital piece and has been frequently recorded.

== Historical context ==
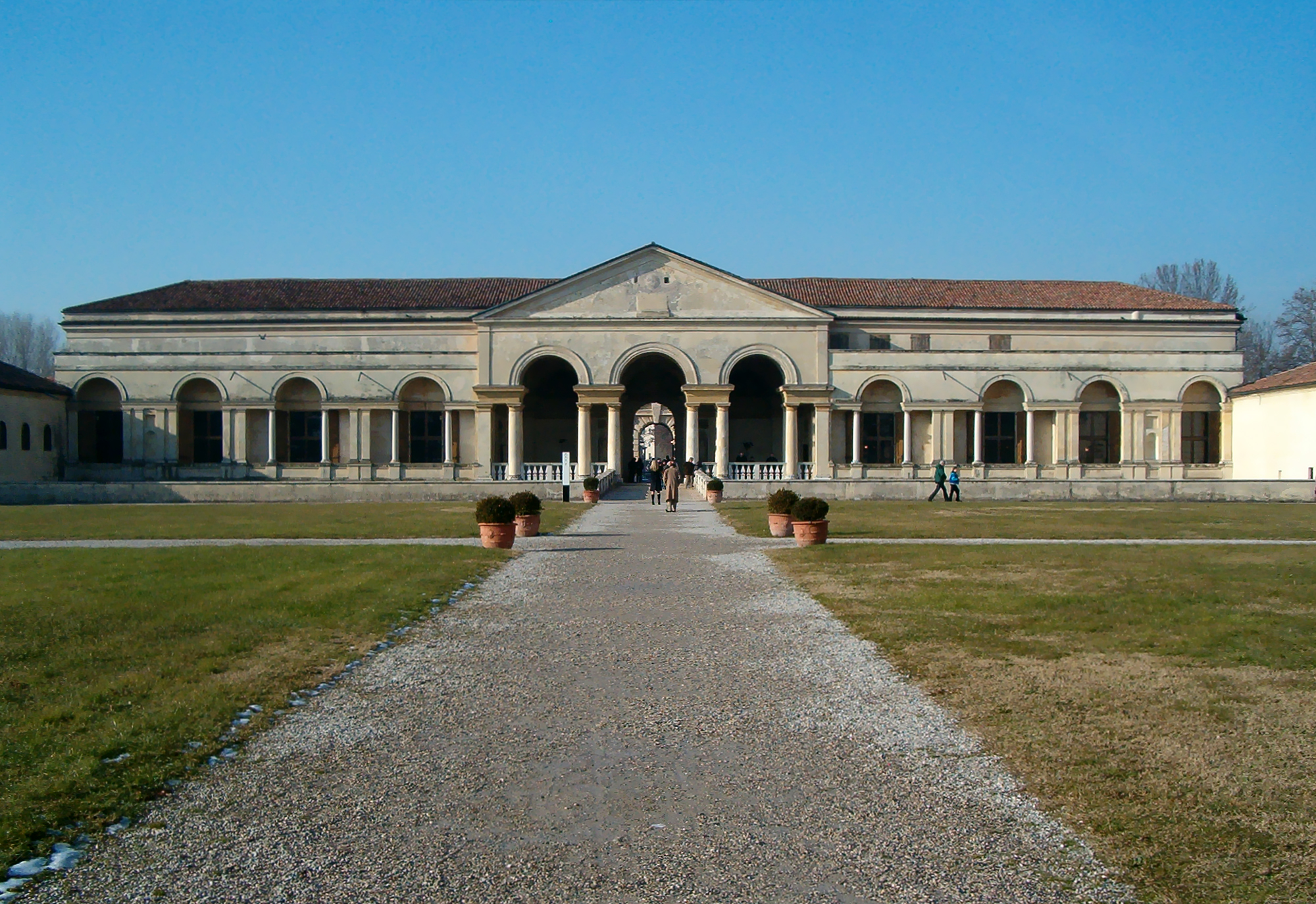
The Palazzo del Te, Mantua, seat of the Gonzaga dynasty which Monteverdi served as a court musician from 1590 to 1612

Claudio Monteverdi (born in Cremona in 1567) began playing viol at the Mantuan court of Duke Vincenzo Gonzaga around 1590. Over the next decade he rose to become the duke's maestro della musica. Meanwhile, musical theatre underwent innovation: Jacopo Peri's Dafne, often cited as the first opera, debuted in Florence in 1598. The duke quickly saw this new musical genre's potential, including the prestige it could bring sponsors.

As part of his duties to the Gonzaga court, Monteverdi was often required to compose or arrange music for staged performances. These works included a fully-fledged opera, L'Orfeo, written to a libretto by Alessandro Striggio the Younger and presented before the court on 24 February 1607. This performance pleased the duke, who ordered a repeat showing for 1 March. A contemporary account records that the piece "could not have been done better ... The music, observing due propriety, serves the poetry so well that nothing more beautiful is to be heard anywhere".

Monteverdi was then required to write several pieces for performance at the wedding of the duke's son and heir Francesco to Margaret of Savoy, planned for early May 1608. These included a musical prologue for Battista Guarini's play L'idropica and a setting of the dramatic ballet Il ballo delle ingrate ("Dance of the Ungrateful Ladies"), with a text by Ottavio Rinuccini. There was also to be an opera, though it was not initially certain that Monteverdi would provide this. Other works under consideration were Peri's Le nozze di Peleo e Tetide ("The marriage of Peleus and Thetis") with a libretto by Francesco Cini, and a new setting of Dafne by Marco da Gagliano. In the event, the former was rejected and the latter designated for performance at the 1607–08 Carnival. The duke decreed that the wedding opera should be based on the myth of Arianna (Ariadne), and that Rinuccini should write the text. Monteverdi was instructed to provide the music.

== Creation ==
=== Libretto ===
At the time of his commission for L'Arianna, Rinuccini was probably the most experienced and distinguished of all librettists. His writing career stretched back to 1579, when he had written verses for the Florentine court entertainment Maschere d'Amazzoni. He had become widely known through his verse contributions to the celebrated intermedi for Girolamo Bargagli's play La Pellegrina (The Pilgrim Woman), performed in May 1589 at the wedding of Ferdinando I de' Medici and Christina of Lorraine. According to Gagliano, Rinuccini was a primary influence in the emergence of opera as a genre; he adapted the conventions of his contemporary lyric poets to produce the librettos for two of the earliest operas, Dafne and Euridice—the latter set to music by both Peri and Giulio Caccini.

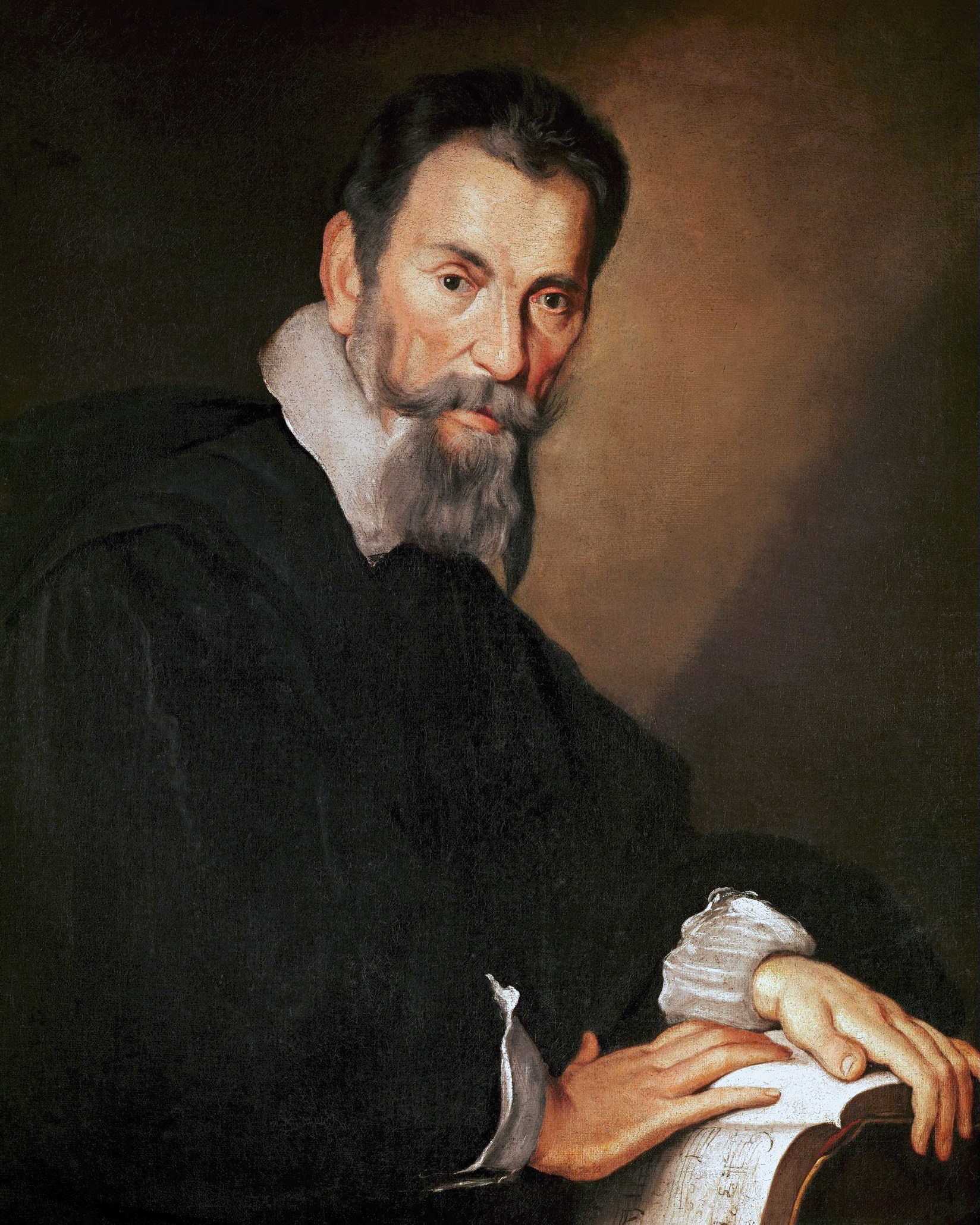
Claudio Monteverdi, c. 1630

For his Arianna libretto Rinuccini drew on a variety of classical sources, notably the tenth book of Ovid's Heroides, parts of the Carmina of Catullus, and the section in Virgil's epic Aeneid dealing with Dido's abandonment by Aeneas. He also used aspects of more recent literary works—Ludovico Ariosto's Orlando Furioso, Torquato Tasso's Gerusalemme liberata, and Giovanni Andrea dell' Anguillara's 1561 translation of Ovid's Metamorphoses. The libretto was extended during the rehearsals when Carlo de' Rossi, a member of the duke's court, reported the Duchess Eleonora's complaint that the piece was "very dry" and needed to be enriched with further action. The libretto published in Venice in 1622 takes the form of a prologue and eight scenes, although other arrangements of the text have been suggested. For example, the musicologist Bojan Bujić has posited an alternative of a prologue and five scenes.

=== Composition ===
Monteverdi probably began composing in late October or early November 1607, since Rinuccini's arrival in Mantua can be dated to 23 October. With rehearsals due to begin in the new year, Monteverdi composed the work in a hurry and under considerable pressure; (Note: In addition to the heavy compositional duties imposed on him by the duke within a short timescale, Monteverdi was coping with the consequences of his wife's death, on 10 September 1607, which left him responsible for two young children.) nearly 20 years later he was still complaining, in a letter to Striggio, of the hardships he had been made to suffer: "It was the shortness of time that brought me almost to death's door in writing L'Arianna".

Monteverdi had apparently completed the score by early January, and rehearsals began. However, his work was not over as he was required to write further music when the work was extended after Rossi's intervention. Among the material added or lengthened were the early scene between Venus and Cupid, and Jupiter's blessing from heaven at the end of the opera. In March 1608, well into the rehearsal period, the opera's scheduled performance was jeopardised by the death, from smallpox, of the leading soprano Caterina Martinelli. Fortunately a replacement was to hand, a renowned actress and singer, Virginia Ramponi-Andreini, known professionally as "La Florinda", who was performing in Mantua. A courtier, Antonio Costantini, later reported that she learned the part of Arianna in six days. The musicologist Tim Carter suggests that Arianna's lament may have been added to the opera at this late stage, to exploit La Florinda's well-known vocal capabilities.

== Roles ==
The casting for the opera's premiere is uncertain. While the participation of singers such as La Florinda and Francesco Rasi can be established, sources have speculated on the involvement of other singers. There are several versions of the published libretto; the list of roles is taken from the publication by Gherardo & Iseppo Imberti, Venice 1622.

Roles, voice types, reference notes
Role	Premiere cast 28 May 1608	Notes
Apollo	Francesco Rasi (tenor)	
Venere (English: Venus)	not known (probably soprano voice)	(Note: According to Carter, the assumption that this role was sung by Settimia Caccini is incorrect, as she was not in Mantua at this time. A letter from a Mantuan courtier, quoted by Fabbri, indicates that the part was given to a singer from Florence who had been sent for as a possible substitute for Martinelli.)
Amore (Cupid)	not known (probably soprano voice)	(Note: It is possible that Andreini may also have sung this role.)
Teseo (Theseus)	possibly Antonio Brandi ("Il Brandino") alto castrato	
Arianna (Ariadne)	Virginia Ramponi-Andreini ("La Florinda") soprano	
Consigliero (Counsellor)	possibly Francesco Campagnolo (tenor)	(Note: Carter indicates that Campagnolo sang in L'Arianna, but does not specify which role(s).)
Messaggero (Tirsi) (A messenger)	possibly Santi Orlandi (tenor)	
Dorilla	possibly Sabina Rossi (soprano)	
Nuntio I (First Envoy)	possibly Francesco Campagnolo (tenor)	
Nuntio II (Second Envoy)	not known	
Giove (Jupiter)	possibly Bassano Casola (tenor)	
Bacco (Bacchus)	Francesco Rasi (tenor)	
Coro di soldati di Teseo; Coro di pescatori; Coro di soldati di Bacco (Chorus of Theseus's soldiers; Chorus of fishermen; Chorus of Bacchus's soldiers)

== Synopsis ==
The action is preceded by a brief prologue, delivered by Apollo. Venus and Cupid are then discovered, in conversation, on a desolate seashore. Venus informs Cupid that Duke Theseus of Athens, together with Ariadne, will soon be arriving on the island of Naxos on their way to Athens. They are fleeing from Crete, where the pair have been complicit in the slaying of Ariadne's monster half-brother, the Minotaur, in the labyrinth below the palace of her father, King Minos. Venus is aware that Theseus intends to abandon Ariadne on Naxos, and to proceed to Athens alone. Cupid offers to rekindle Theseus's passion for Ariadne, but Venus has decided to unite her with the god Bacchus, and asks Cupid to arrange this.

Cupid conceals himself, as Theseus and Ariadne arrive on the island a short distance away. Ariadne muses over her disloyalty to her father, but declares her love for Theseus. She departs to find shelter for the night, after which a fishermen's chorus compares her eyes with the stars of heaven. Theseus, alone with his counsellor, discusses his abandonment of Ariadne, and is advised that this decision is justified, as she will not be acceptable to the people of Athens as their ruler's consort.

A chorus greets the dawn as Ariadne, after a troubled night's sleep, returns to the shore with her companion, Dorilla, to find that Theseus has departed. Dorilla offers her comfort. In despair at the thought that Theseus will not return, Ariadne nevertheless decides to go to the landing area to wait for him. In a pastoral interlude a chorus sings of the joys of rural life, and expresses the hope that Theseus will not forget Ariadne. Primed by an envoy with the news that Ariadne is alone and sorrowing, the chorus again sings in sympathy with her. On the beach, Ariadne sings her lament for her lost love and prepares to kill herself. At this point fanfares are heard heralding an arrival, causing Ariadne to hope that it is Theseus returning. In another interlude the chorus empathises, but a second envoy announces that it is Bacchus who has arrived, having taken pity on Ariadne. A sung ballo celebrates the anticipated betrothal of Bacchus and Ariadne. In the final scene Cupid reappears, and Venus rises from the sea before Jupiter speaks his blessing from the heavens. The union is sealed as Bacchus promises Ariadne immortality in heaven, and a crown of stars.

== Performance history ==
=== Premiere: Mantua, 1608 ===
The date of the Gonzaga wedding was repeatedly postponed, because of diplomatic problems which delayed the bride's arrival in Mantua until 24 May. The wedding festivities began four days later; L'Arianna was performed on 28 May 1608, the first of the several spectacular entertainments. A large temporary theatre had been built for the occasion; according to the court's chronicler Federico Follino this held 6,000 people—a figure which Carter deems unlikely. Whatever its size, the arena could not hold everyone who wished to be present. Follino's account records that although the duke had strictly limited the numbers from his household entitled to be there, many distinguished foreign visitors could not be seated and were obliged to crowd around the doors.

Although contained within a single stage set, the production was lavish, with 300 men employed to manipulate the stage machinery. Follino's report described the set as "a wild rocky place in the midst of the waves, which in the furthest part of the prospect could be seen always in motion". As the action began, Apollo was revealed "sitting on a very beautiful cloud ... which, moving down little by little ... reached in a short space of time the stage and ... disappeared in a moment". Thereafter, all the performers proved excellent in the art of singing; "every part succeeded more than wondrously". Follino's enthusiasm was echoed in other reports made by dignitaries to their own courts. The ambassador for the House of Este, who referred to the work as "a comedy in music", mentioned in particular Andreini's performance which, in her lament, "made many weep", and that of Francesco Rasi, who as Bacchus "sang divinely". Monteverdi's fellow composer Marco da Gagliano wrote that Monteverdi's music had "moved the entire audience to tears". In all, the opera lasted for two and a half hours.

=== Revival: Venice, 1639–40 ===
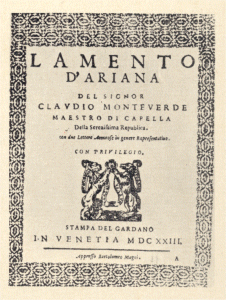
Front page of the 1623 Venice edition of "Lamento d'Ariana" (sic)

Despite the positive reception accorded to L'Arianna at its premiere, the duke did not request a second showing, as he had with L'Orfeo the previous year". The next hint of a performance of L'Arianna is in 1614, when the Medici court in Florence requested a copy of the score, presumably with the intention of staging it. There is, however, no record of any such performance there. Early in 1620 Striggio asked Monteverdi to send him the music for a projected performance in Mantua as part of the celebration for the Duchess Caterina's birthday. Monteverdi went to the trouble and expense of preparing a new manuscript with revisions; had he had more time, he informed Striggio, he would have revised the work more thoroughly. Hearing nothing further from the Mantuan court, Monteverdi wrote to Striggio on 18 April 1620, offering to help with the staging. A month or so later, however, he learned that the duchess's celebrations had been scaled back, and that there had been no performance of L'Arianna.

There is some evidence to suggest a possible performance in Dubrovnik, in or some time after 1620; a Croatian translation of the libretto was published in Ancona in 1633. However, the only known revival of the work came in Venice, in 1640. Public theatre opera had come to the city in March 1637, when the new Teatro San Cassiano opened with a performance of L'Andromeda by Francesco Manelli. The popularity of this and other works led to more theatres converting their facilities for opera; L'Arianna was chosen to inaugurate the Teatro San Moisè as an opera house during the 1639–40 Carnival (the precise date of this performance is not recorded). A revised version of the libretto had been published in 1639, with substantial cuts and revisions from the 1608 version to remove passages too specifically linked to the Mantuan wedding. The composer, who was by then 73 years old, had acquired considerable prestige in Venice, having been director of music at St Mark's Basilica since 1613. The dedication in the revised and republished libretto describes him as "[the] most celebrated Apollo of the century and the highest intelligence of the heavens of humanity". The opera was received with great enthusiasm by a Venetian audience already familiar with the lament, which had been published in the city in 1623. Within a few weeks the theatre replaced L'Arianna with Monteverdi's new opera Il ritorno d'Ulisse in patria, which proved an even greater success.

== Loss ==
After the Venice revival of 1639–40 there are no further records of performances of L'Arianna. Rinuccini's libretto, which was published on several occasions during Monteverdi's lifetime, has survived intact, but the opera's music disappeared some time after 1640, with the exception of Ariadne's scene 6 lament, known as "Lamento d'Arianna". In the loss of its music the opera shares the fate of most of Monteverdi's theatrical works, including six of his other nine operas. Carter's explanation for the high rate of attrition is that "memories were short and large-scale musical works often had limited currency beyond their immediate circumstances"; such music was rarely published and quickly discarded.

== "Lamento d'Arianna" ==
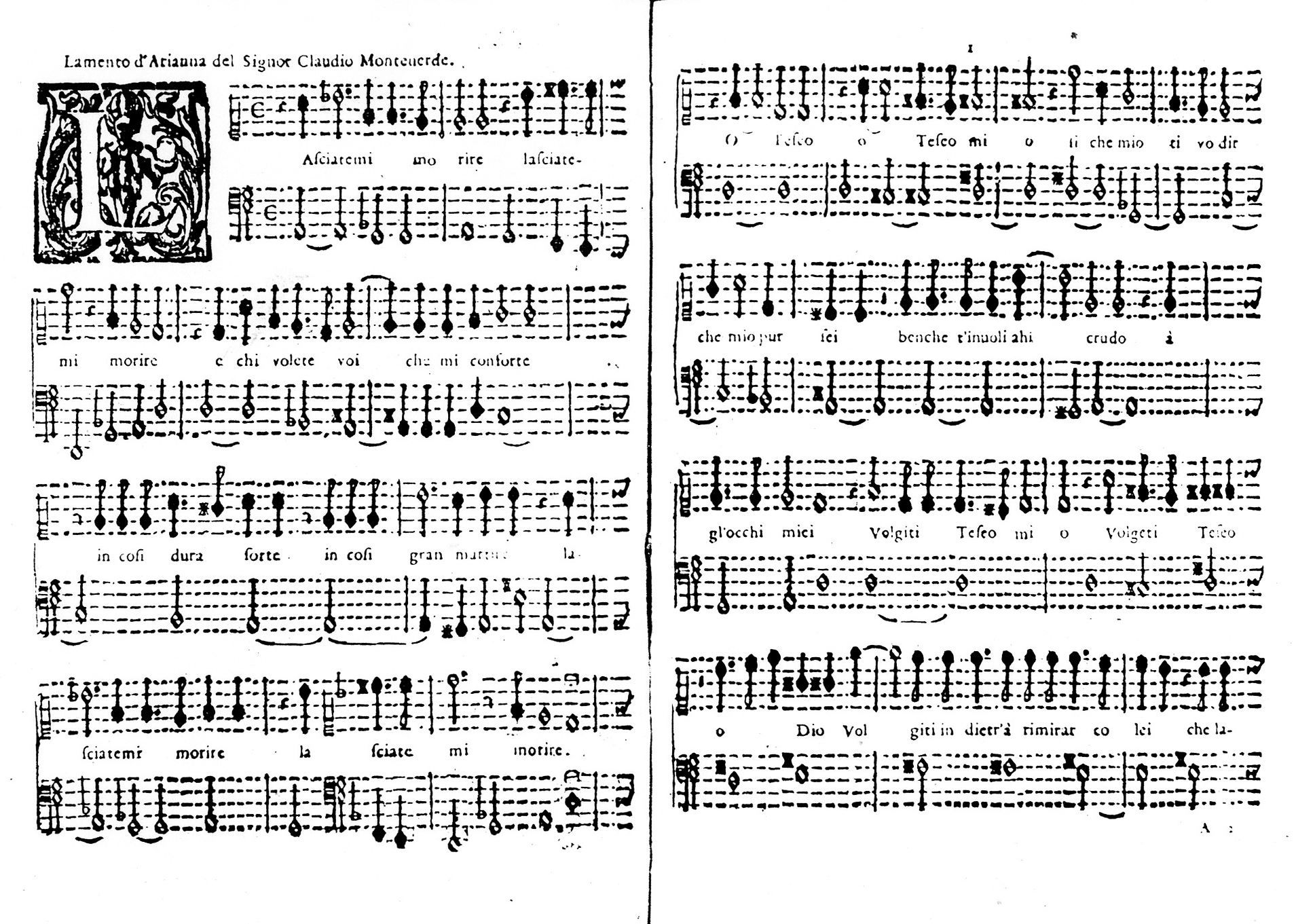
First two pages of the first edition of the "Lamento", published by Gardano in Venice in 1623

The lament was saved from oblivion by Monteverdi's decision to publish it independently from the opera: first in 1614 as a five-voice madrigal, then in 1623 as a monody, and finally in 1641 as a sacred hymn, "Lamento della Madonna". The five-voice adaptation was included in the composer's Sixth Book of Madrigals; there is evidence that this arrangement was made at the suggestion of an unnamed Venetian gentleman who thought that the melody would benefit from counterpoint. In 1868, François-Auguste Gevaert published the lament in Paris, and in 1910 the Italian composer Ottorino Respighi issued an edited, orchestral transcription, P 088.

In her analysis of the lament, the musicologist Suzanne Cusick asserts that "[T]o a large extent Monteverdi's fame and historical status rested for centuries on the universal appreciation of his achievement in the celebrated lament [which] was among the most emulated, and therefore influential, works of the early 17th century". In Cusick's view Monteverdi "creat[ed] the lament as a recognizable genre of vocal chamber music and as a standard scene in opera ... that would become crucial, almost genre-defining, to the full-scale public operas of 17th-century Venice" and she concludes by noting that the women of Mantua would have recognised the transformations enacted in the lament as representative of their own life stories. Monteverdi, she believes, sought to represent in music the eventual triumph of female piety over promiscuity: "Arianna's gradual loss of her passionate self in the lament constitutes a public musical chastening of this incautious woman who dared to choose her own mate". In her study The Recitative Soliloquy, Margaret Murata records that laments of this kind became a staple feature of operas until about 1650, "thereafter more rarely until the total triumph of the aria around 1670". Mark Ringer, in his analysis of Monteverdi's musical drama, suggests that the lament defines Monteverdi's innovative creativity in a manner similar to that in which, two-and-a-half centuries later, the "Prelude" and the "Liebestod" in Tristan und Isolde announced Wagner's discovery of new expressive frontiers.

In its operatic context the lament takes the form of an extended recitative of more than 70 vocal lines, delivered in five sections divided by choral comments. Some of the wording is prefigured in the immediately preceding scene in which the First Envoy describes Arianna's plight to a sympathetic chorus of fishermen. The lament depicts Arianna's various emotional reactions to her abandonment: sorrow, anger, fear, self-pity, desolation and a sense of futility. Cusick draws attention to the manner in which Monteverdi is able to match in music the "rhetorical and syntactical gestures" in Rinuccini's text. The opening repeated words "Lasciatemi morire" (Let me die) are accompanied by a dominant seventh chord which Ringer describes as "an unforgettable chromatic stab of pain"; Monteverdi was one of the first users of this musical device. What follows, says Ringer, has a range and depth "comparable to Shakespeare's most searching soliloquies". The words "Lasciatemi morire" are followed by "O Teseo, O Teseo mio" (O Theseus, my Theseus"); the two phrases represent Arianna's contrasting emotions of despair and longing. Throughout the lament indignation and anger are punctuated by tenderness, until the final iteration of "O Teseo", after which a descending line brings the lament to a quiet conclusion.

Among other composers who adopted the format and style of Arianna's lament were Francesco Cavalli, whose opera Le nozze di Teti e di Peleo contains three such pieces; Francesco Costa, who included a setting of Rinuccini's text in his madrigal collection Pianto d'Arianna; and Sigismondo d'India, who wrote several laments in the 1620s after the monodic version of Arianna's lament was published in 1623. Monteverdi himself used the expressive lament format in each of his two late operas, Il ritorno d'Ulisse in patria and L'incoronazione di Poppea, for the respective characters of Penelope and Ottavia. In 1641 Monteverdi adapted Arianna's lament into a sacred song with a Latin text "Pianto della Madonna" (incipit: "Iam moriar, mi fili"), which he included in Selva morale e spirituale, the last of his works published during his lifetime.

== Recordings, "Lamento d'Arianna" ==
Many recordings are available of both the five-voice madrigal and the solo voice version of the "Lamento". The solo recordings include several versions which use a tenor or baritone voice. Among leading singers who have issued recordings are the sopranos Emma Kirkby and Véronique Gens, and the mezzo-sopranos Janet Baker and Anne Sofie von Otter.

== Editions ==
At least eight versions of the libretto were published between 1608 and 1640. The following is a list of the known editions:

- Aurelio et Ludovico Osanna, Mantua, 1608. Publication of the text included in Federico Follini's report of the 1608 performance;
- Heredi di Francesco Osanna, Mantua, 1608. Possibly the text circulated to the audience at the 1608 performance;
- I. Giunti, Florence, 1608;
- Bernardo Giunti, Giovan Battista Ciotti & Co., Venice, 1608;
- Ghirardo et Iseppo Imberti, Venice, 1622;
- G. F. Gundulić, Ancona, 1633. Croatian translation, prepared for possible performance in Dubrovnik c. 1620. (5 scenes version);
- Angelo Salvadori, Venice, 1639. Revised version prepared for the 1640 revival;
- Antonio Bariletti, Venice, 1640.
