= Cristofano Malvezzi =

Italian composer

Cristofano Malvezzi (baptised June 28, 1547 – January 22, 1599) was an Italian organist and composer of the late Renaissance. He was one of the most famous composers in the city of Florence during a time of transition to the Baroque style.

Malevezzi was born in Lucca. From 1551 he lived in Florence, serving the Medicis from 1562. He held a number of organist posts in the city, and also taught pupils, among them Jacopo Peri, who is often regarded as the inventor of opera. From 1573 he held the double post of maestro di cappella at the cathedral as well as at S Giovanni Battista, which was the highest position for a musician in the city. Among his works are three books of madrigals, a book of ricercars, but only two sacred compositions—a curious omission for a composer so closely connected with the church.

Because of his activity in Florence, the numerous intermedi that he wrote for the Medici and other members of the aristocracy, his dedication of a book of ricercars to Count Giovanni de' Bardi, and the dedication of a book of madrigals to Emilio de' Cavalieri, it is likely that he was a member of the Florentine Camerata, the group of progressive musicians and poets who, in attempting to recreate the music of ancient Greece, created the first monody and ultimately the first opera. This is reinforced by the fact that he composed much of the music for the La Pellegrina intermedi of 1589, which was carefully designed by the Camerata. Whether or not he was part of the intimate group, his music was among the best known in Florence. One of the grandest compositions of the time, a colossal setting of O fortunato giorno which he composed for a sumptuous intermedio intended for an aristocratic marriage, is for thirty separate vocal parts divided into seven spatially separated choirs. Some of his madrigals are written in the monodic style, which implies further a possible connection with the Camerata.

Malvezzi's brother Alberigo (around 1550–1615) was also an organist and composer.

== References and further reading ==
- "Cristofano Malvezzi," in The New Grove Dictionary of Music and Musicians, ed. Stanley Sadie. 20 vol. London, Macmillan Publishers Ltd., 1980. ISBN 1-56159-174-2
