= Dafne =

First modern opera

- Opera by: Jacopo Peri; Jacopo Corsi
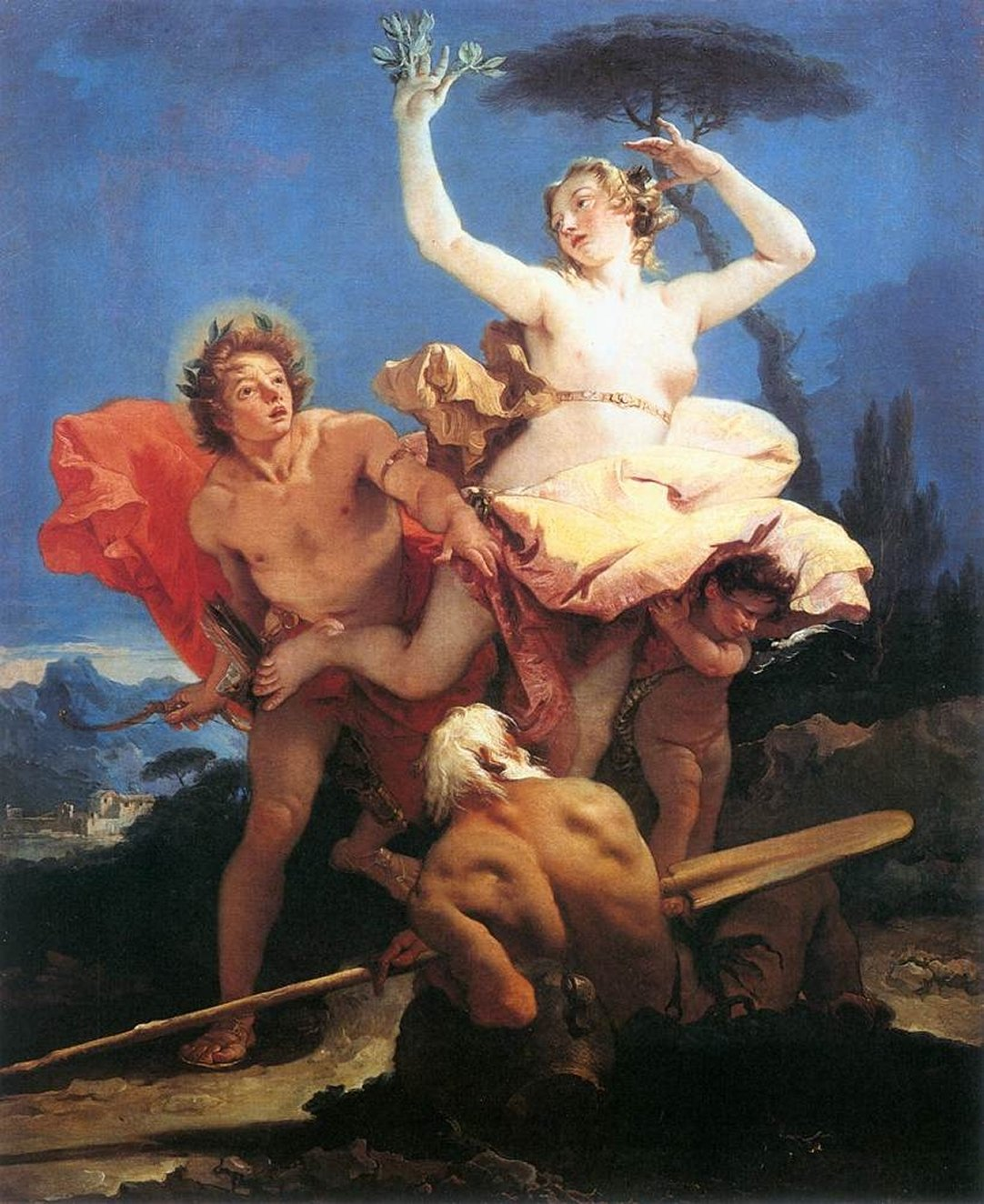
- Daphne Chased by Apollo, by Giovanni Battista Tiepolo, 1744
- Librettist: Ottavio Rinuccini
- Language: Italian
- Based on: Daphne myth
- Premiere: 1598; Palazzo Corsi, Florence

Dafne (Italian pronunciation: [ˈdaf.ne], Italian for "Daphne") is the earliest known work that, by modern standards, could be considered an opera. The libretto by Ottavio Rinuccini, based on an earlier intermedio created in 1589, "Combattimento di Apollo col serpente Pitone" ("the battle between Apollo and Python"), and set to music by Luca Marenzio, survives complete. The opera is considered to be the first "modern music drama."

The mostly lost music was completed by Jacopo Peri, but at least two of the six surviving fragments are by Jacopo Corsi. Dafne was first performed during Carnival of 1598 (1597 old style) at the Palazzo Corsi.

== History ==
Most of Peri's music has been lost, despite its popularity and fame in Europe at the time of its composition, but the 455-line verse libretto was published and survives. Florence's ruling Medici family was sufficiently taken with Dafne to allow Peri's next work, Euridice, to be performed as part of Marie de' Medici and Henry IV's wedding celebrations in 1600.

The opera was written for an elite circle of humanists in Florence, the Florentine Camerata, between 1594 and 1597, with the support, and possibly the collaboration, of the composer and patron Jacopo Corsi. However, the first confirmed, non-public, performance of the work for Don Giovanni de' Medici was held in 1597 thanks to Marco da Gagliano. On Peri's own account, the opera seems to have been performed during three carnival celebrations (1595–1598), with the opera having been composed the year prior. The opera was later performed in 1599 at the Palazzo Pitti and at the Palazzo Guicciardini Corsi Salviati no later than January of the same year, but dates of performances are under scholastic debate.

As an attempt to revive ancient Greek drama, it was a long way off from what the ancient Greeks would have recognized as dramatic art.

== Story ==
The opera's story regarding Apollo falling in love with the eponymous nymph, Daphne, takes its inspiration from Ovid and his series of narrative poems, "Metamorphoses," widely used in the operas in the Florentine, Mantuan, and Roman operatic spheres.

According to Rinunccini's libretto, Apollo saves mankind by shooting Python, and soon pushes Cupid into an archery contest to see who's the better shot. As a way to get back at him, Cupid shoots him and makes him fall in love with Daphne. In order to get away from Apollo, Daphne turns into a laurel tree which Apollo then makes a crown of, this becoming the symbol of poetry, music, and freedom.

== Music ==
Dafne is scored for a much smaller ensemble than Claudio Monteverdi's slightly later operas, namely, a harpsichord, a lute, a viol, a chitarrone, and a triple flute. Drawing on a new development at the time, Peri established recitatives, melodic speech set to music, as a central part of opera.

Peri's musical language was a conglomeration of his contemporaries and the experimentation with the invocation of human speech in music through recitative and musical prosody. For Peri, he strove to replicate the flow and musicality of speech in his writing, while contemporaries Emilio de' Cavalieri and Giulio Caccini sought different but similar compositional goals. As a result, the music written for the opera may have been co-written with help from Caccini but contemporary research does not support this.

== See also ==
- La Dafne (Gagliano), 1608
- Dafne (Opitz–Schütz), 1627
- Dafne in lauro (Fux), 1714
- Daphne (Strauss), 1938
