= Intermedio =

Theatrical performance with music and dance

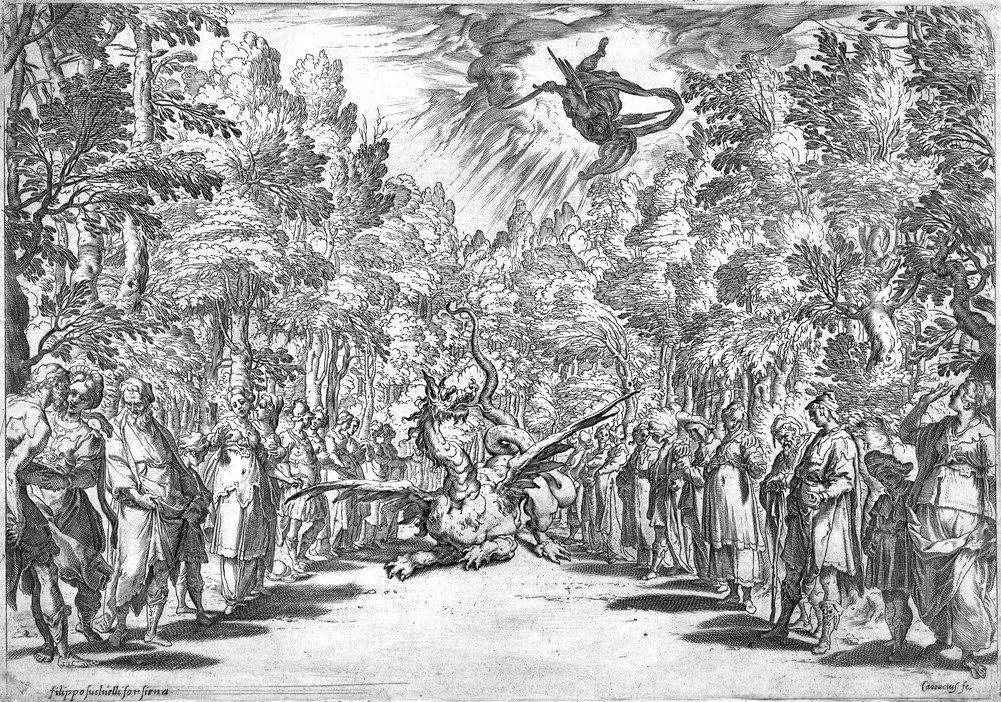
Setting designed by Bernardo Buontalenti for the third intermedio from the 1589 Medici wedding: Apollo defeats the monster terrorizing Delos.

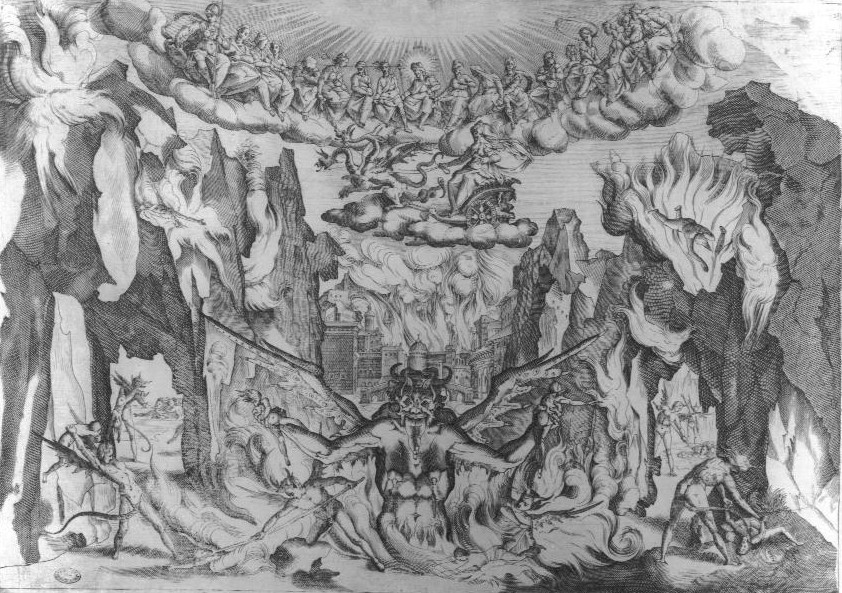
Another of the 1589 intermedi: number 4: the demons lament that with the coming of the Golden Age there will be no more souls to torment.

The intermedio [interˈmɛːdjo] (also intromessa, introdutto, tramessa, tramezzo, intermezzo, intermedii), in the Italian Renaissance, was a theatrical performance or spectacle with music and often dance, which was performed between the acts of a play to celebrate special occasions in Italian courts. It was one of the important precursors to opera, and an influence on other forms like the English court masque. Weddings in ruling families and similar state occasions were the usual occasion for the most lavish intermedi, in cities such as Florence and Ferrara. Some of the best documentation of intermedi comes from weddings of the House of Medici, in particular the 1589 Medici wedding (between Christina of Lorraine and Ferdinando I de' Medici, Grand Duke of Tuscany), which featured what was undoubtedly both the most spectacular set of intermedi, and the best known, thanks to no fewer than 18 contemporary published festival books and sets of prints that were financed by the Grand Duke.

Intermedi were written and performed from the late 15th century through the 17th century, although the peak of development of the genre was in the late 16th century. After 1600 the form merged with opera, for the most part, though intermedi continued to be used in non-musical plays in certain settings (for example in academies), and also continued to be performed between the acts of operas.

== Development ==
The first intermedii were not in Florence but in Ferrara at the end of the 15th century between the five acts of plays by the classical authors Plautus and Terence. Writing of the "intermezzi" at the wedding of Lucrezia Borgia in 1502, Isabella d'Este said that they were more interesting than the boring commedia, "a remark destined to be often repeated". Ferrara intermezzi at this period were short and without a unifying theme; they included choruses, recitations and moresca dances. But by 1513 there was a unifying allegory, explained at the end. It was for Florentine public celebrations that Intermedii came into their own; several were organised by Machiavelli when he was part of the government of the Republic of Florence in the early 16th century, and the returning Medici adopted a policy of keeping the aristocracy occupied by involving them in productions.

As the intermedio developed in the 16th century, it grew more and more elaborate, often becoming a "play within a play"; for example during a five-act play, an intermedio would consist of four parts, which might be presented as a four-part metaphor of time passing in the play. This stage begins with Il commodo, from the Medici wedding in Florence of Cosimo I and Eleanor of Toledo in 1539, where the four parts were morning, noon, afternoon, and night, represented with an elaborate mechanical artificial sun, with singing and dancing appropriate to each time. Some critics of the time noted that the intermedi had become so elaborate that the play had begun to serve as intermedi to the intermedi.

== Mature intermedio ==
Originally intermedi had used the sets already on the stage from the main play, typically fairly simple ones for a comedy, with a few extra pieces, but later they had their own sets, which a mythological subject required to be more elaborate. Vasari's production for yet another Medici wedding in 1565 "embodied stupendous advances in engineering technique" with all the elaborate movements of scenery done without a curtain in full view of the audience. According to Roy Strong: "the designs for the 1589 intermezzi are crucial, for they are the earliest mass-disseminated illustrations of what became a norm throughout Europe for theatrical visual experience for the next three hundred years, the proscenium arch behind which receded ranks of side wings, the vista closed by a back-shutter." Eventually the form acquired a tradition and cohesiveness that allowed it to stand on its own, and it was thus a logical development to combine the existing features with sung, acted parts, and be absorbed into the new artform of opera, which also drew from the traditions of monody and madrigal comedy. Jacopo Peri, the composer of Dafne, the first opera, was one of the composers, and almost certainly performers, in the 1589 Medici intermezzi, and the librettist for both, Ottavio Rinuccini, seems to have recycled in Dafne some of the material from the 1589 Delos scene (illustrated at top).

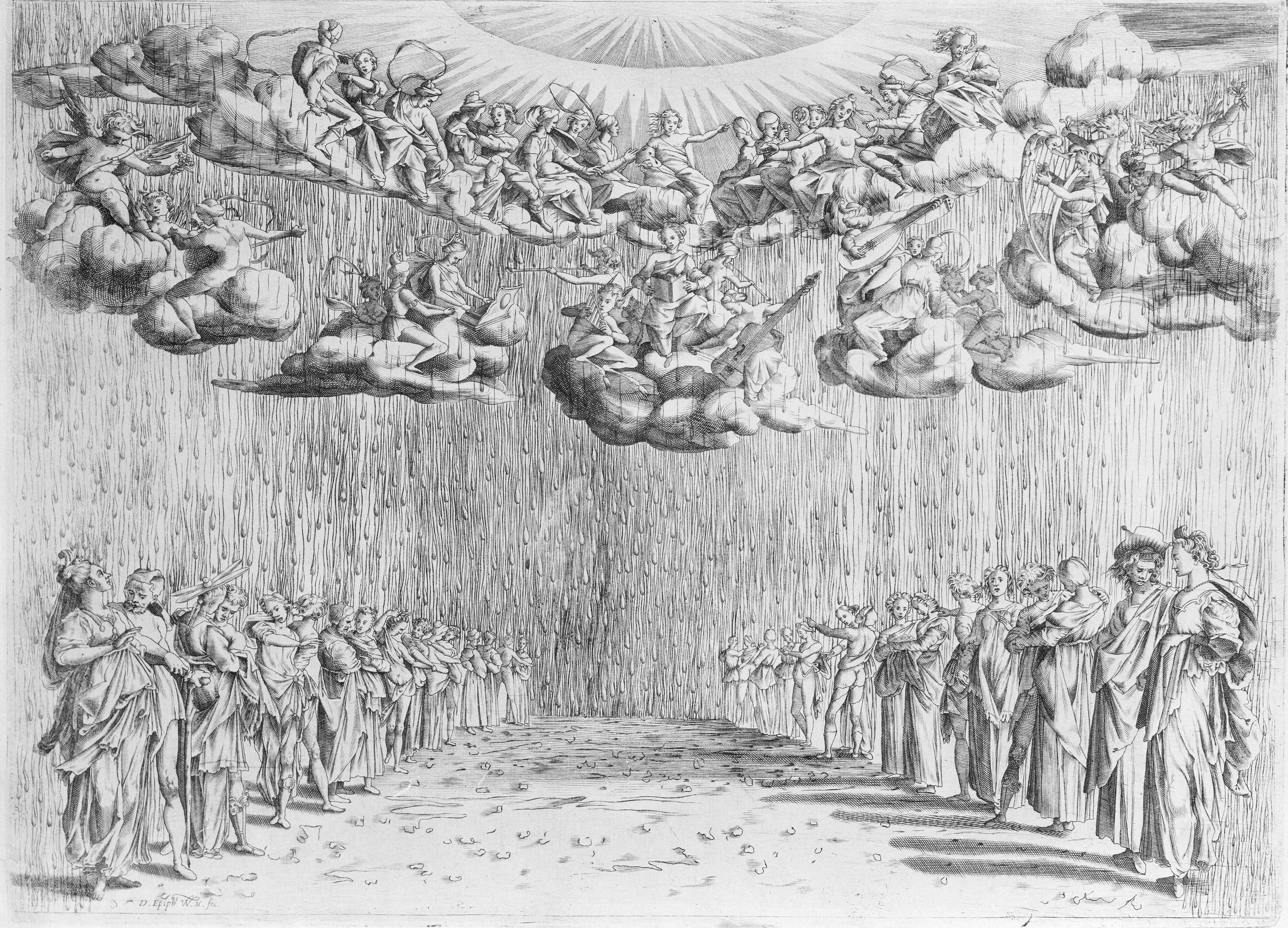
Another of the 1589 intermedi; 6th intermedio: Apollo and Bacchus descend, accompanied by Harmony, Rhythm, the Three Graces, Flora and others.

"Festival books", produced as souvenirs of lavish festivities, contain detailed descriptions of many important intermedi, such as those for the Medici wedding of 1589, for which 286 costumes were made. Although music written specially for this occasion survives (see discography below), this is usually not the case, and music written for other occasions, for example madrigals and instrumental pieces, was often used in intermedi. The subject matter of the intermedio was usually a mythological or pastoral story, which could be told in mime, by costumed singers or actors, or by dance, or any combination of these. There was invariably a political message, even if this was limited to general glorification of the ruling family; at times more specific messages were intended. Some thematic connection with the main play might be made, though intermedii could be repeated with different plays from the one they were written for.

Numerous drawings and engravings of the stage sets survive, as well as texts of the libretti and descriptions of the music and action; the 1589 Medici intermezzi were especially well recorded, and "were to be the fount of Italian baroque scenography as well as influencing the development of the stage north of the Alps, above all the Stuart court masques designed by Inigo Jones". The actual content in terms of staging, music, instrumentation, presence of singers, actors, dancers, or mime was highly variable throughout the period, and sometimes all of these features were present. The 1589 intermedi were performed in the recently completed theatre in the Uffizi Palace before an audience of about three thousand, and three further performances were given some days after the end of the wedding festivities. Further significant sets of Medici intermedi were produced for the weddings in 1600 of Henry IV of France and Marie de' Medici, and then in 1608 of Grand Duke Cosimo II and a Habsburg princess, Maria Magdalena of Austria. However the 1600 celebrations also included a portent of things to come in the form of performances of Jacopo Peri's opera Euridice, the earliest surviving example of the form.

== Music of the Medici intermedi ==
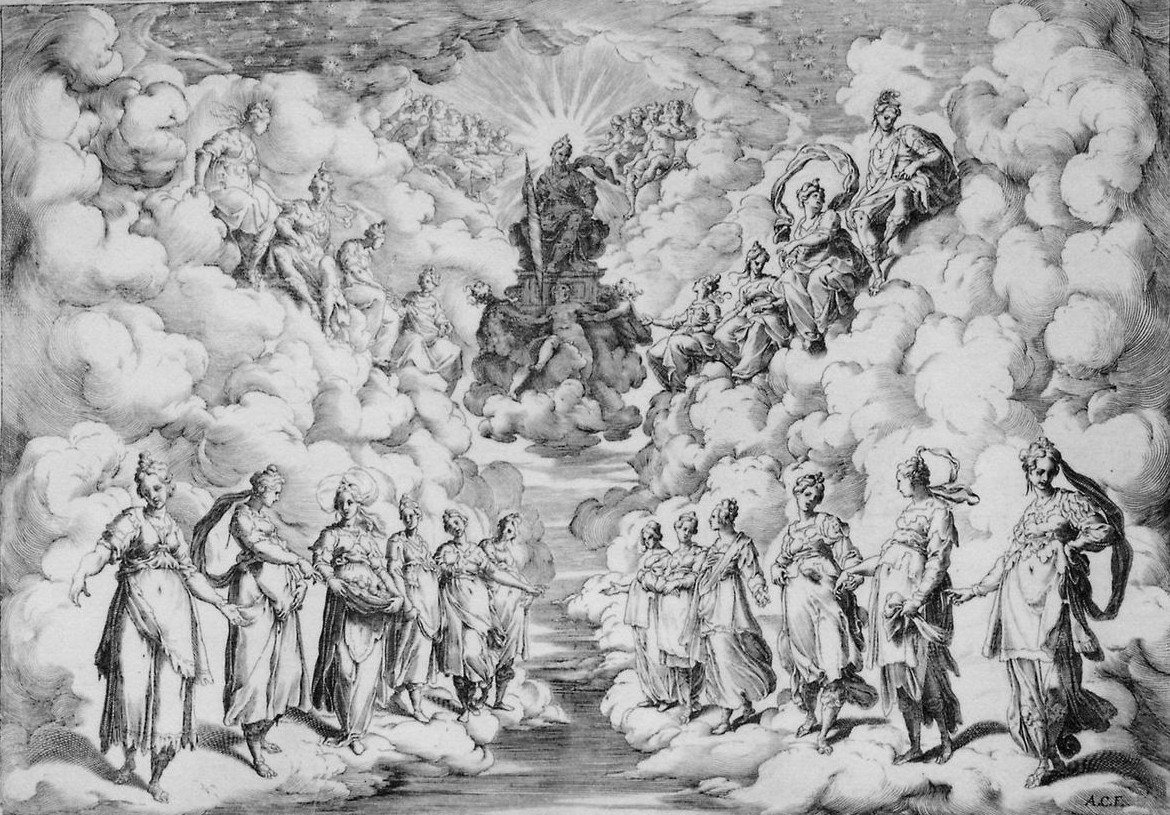
Another of the 1589 intermedi: number 1: Harmony descends to earth

Of the various intermedi that were performed, only the music to some parts of Il commodo (1539) and, through a 1591 printed edition by Cristofano Malvezzi, an almost complete version of La Pellegrina (1589) are known to have survived.

In 1539 most of the pieces are in four and five parts so much of this music is suitable for domestic playing. The 1589 music is very different being largely big set pieces for 6, 12, 18 or even 30 parts; 41 instrumentalists were required in all, some hidden around the stage as there was not room for them all in one place. Smaller scale pieces are often difficult florid monody of the Caccini new music variety.

Of the surviving intermedi only two numbers were a cappella, (not counting the madrigals which were sung at the banquet in 1539 which of course are not intermedi). This means we have surviving descriptions of precise instrumentation.

Classical humanist dramatic theory says a play should have action taking place during one entire day. These intermedi do not follow what were believed to be the classical instructions, having an overture item, Vattene almo riposo, and a night time ending for tenor voice accompanied by four sackbuts and an extra coda the bacchanale, Baccho, Baccho, E U O E.

== Similar forms outside Italy ==
The similar form which developed in France at the same time was called the intermède; it was more reliant on dance than the Italian version. The French court under Catherine de' Medici was also staging court festivities of increasing lavishness – Catherine's granddaughter was the Medici bride in 1589. The masque in England also had many similarities to the intermedio, although it did not originate as a "filler" between acts in a play in the same way. The later 18th century intermezzo in opera showed a reversal of the Renaissance scheme; now a single short comic intermezzo was inserted between the acts of a heroic opera seria.

== References and further reading ==
- Warren Kirkendale, Emilio De' Cavalieri Gentiluomo Romano, (Florence, 2001).
- Howard Mayer Brown, Sixteenth-century instrumentation: the music for the Florentine intermedii, (American Institute of Musicology, 1973).
- J.R. Mulryne, Helen Watanabe-O'Kelly and Margaret Shewring (eds.), "Europa Triumphans": Court and Civic Festivals in Early Modern Europe, (Aldershot and Burlington VT: Ashgate, 2004)
- Alois Nagler, Theatre Festivals of the Medicis 1539-1637, 1964, Yale UP
- Article "Intermedio", in The New Grove Dictionary of Music and Musicians, ed. Stanley Sadie. 20 vol. London, Macmillan Publishers Ltd., 1980. ISBN 1-56159-174-2
- The New Harvard Dictionary of Music, ed. Don Randel. Cambridge, Massachusetts, Harvard University Press, 1986. ISBN 0-674-61525-5
- Reed, Sue Welsh & Wallace, Richard (eds), Italian Etchers of the Renaissance and Baroque, 1989, Museum of Fine Arts, Boston, ISBN 0-87846-306-2 or 304-4 (pb)
- Gustave Reese, Music in the Renaissance. New York, W.W. Norton & Co., 1954. ISBN 0-393-09530-4
- James Saslow, The Medici Wedding of 1589, Yale University Press, 1996
- Shearman, John. Mannerism, 1967, Pelican, London, ISBN 0-14-020808-9
- Roy Strong; Art and Power; Renaissance Festivals 1450-1650, 1984, The Boydell Press;ISBN 0-85115-200-7

=== Editions of the music ===
- Andrew C. Minor and Bonner Mitchell, A Renaissance Entertainment, (Univ. Missouri Press, 1968).
- Martin Grayson, George and Rosemary Bate, Music for a Medici Wedding, (Modern playing edition of 1539 Intermedio), https://web.archive.org/web/20080419100949/http://www.alfredston-music.co.uk/ (1994).
- D. P. Walker, Musique des Intermedes de "La Pellegrina", (CNRS, Paris), (1963, reprinted 1986).
- Edward Lambert, "A Wedding in Florence", complete 1539 music in modern performing edition, with additions (2017)

== Discography ==
- Firenze 1539 - Musiche fatte nelle nozze dello illustrissimo duca di Firenze il signor Cosimo de Medici et della illustrissima consorte sua mad. Leonora da Tolletto, Centro de Musique Ancienne di Genevra / Studio di Musica Rinascimentale di Palermo / Schola "Jacopo da Bologna", conducted by Gabriel Garrido, (TACTUS TC 500301).
- Ein Hochzeitsfest in Florenz 1539, Weser-Renaissance Bremen, conducted by Manfred Cordes, in: Tage alter Musik in Herne 2001: Allianzen - Musik und Politik in Werken vom Mittelalter bis zur Romantik. Westdeutscher Rundfunk Köln / Tage alter Musik Herne, http://www.tage-alter-musik.de (2001). Only the intermedii by Corteccia.
- La Pellegrina - Music for the Wedding of Ferdinando De Medici and Christine de Lorraine, Florence 1589, conducted by Andrew Parrot, (EMI).
- La Pellegrina - Music for the Wedding of Ferdinando De Medici and Christine de Lorraine, Princess of France, Florence 1589, conducted by Paul Van Nevel, singers: Katelijne Van Laethem, Pascal Bertin, et al. (Sony/Columbia - 63362, 1998). 2 CDs.
- La Pellegrina - Intermedii 1589, Capriccio Stravagante Renaissance Orchestra and Collegium Vocale Gent conducted by Skip Sempe, singers: Dorothée Leclair, Soprano / Monika Mauch, Soprano / Pascal Bertin, Alto / Stephan van Dyck, Tenor / Jean-François Novelli, Tenor / Antoni Fajardo, Bass. (2 CDs Paradizo PA0004 - 2007)
