= Caterina Martinelli =

Italian opera singer (died 1608)

Caterina Martinelli (1589 or 1590 – March 7, 1608). was an Italian opera singer, who was employed by Duke Vincenzo I of Mantua from 1603 until her death in 1608. She is best remembered for creating the title role in Marco da Gagliano's La Dafne; one of the earliest surviving operas.

== Life ==
Martinelli was born in Rome in either 1589 or 1590. In 1603, she came to Mantua at the request of Duke Vincenzo, who originally intended for her to be trained in Florence first but later changed his mind. After arriving in Mantua, she lived in Monteverdi's household. It's possible that she was trained as a singer by Monteverdi's wife in addition to receiving instruction from Monteverdi and Francesco Rasi.

While little is known about her life after she arrived in Mantua, it is presumable that she sang regularly at the court and that Monteverdi wrote many pieces of music for her. Until her death, she was the Duke's preferred soprano in the court. In February 1608 she created the title role in Marco da Gagliano's La Dafne; one of the earliest known operas. The title role in Claudio Monteverdi's opera L'Arianna was written for Martinelli, but she died prior to its premier.

Martinelli died of small pox on March 7, 1608. The Duke had a marble tomb built for her and ordered that Carmelite Priests should celebrate Mass and Offices in her memory every year on the anniversary of her death. At the request of the Duke, Monteverdi composed a setting of a sestina written in her memory by Scipione Agnelli, a Mantuan bishop. The resulting work was the madrigal cycle Lagrime d'amante al sepolcro dell'amata.
