= Emilio de' Cavalieri =

Italian composer (c.1550–1602)

- Born: circa 1550; Rome, Papal States
- Died: March 11, 1602 (aged 52); Rome, Papal States
- Resting place: Cappella de' Cavalieri in Santa Maria in Ara Coeli, Rome
- Occupation: Composer
- Employer: Ferdinando I de' Medici
- Father: Tommaso dei Cavalieri

Emilio de' Cavalieri (c. 1550 – 11 March 1602), or Emilio dei Cavalieri (the spellings "del" and "Cavaliere" are contemporary typographical errors), was an Italian composer, producer, organist, diplomat, choreographer and dancer at the end of the Renaissance era. His work, along with that of other composers active in Rome, Florence and Venice, was critical in defining the beginning of the musical Baroque era. A member of the Roman School of composers, he was an influential early composer of monody, and wrote what is usually considered to be the first oratorio.

== Life ==
Cavalieri was born in Rome of an aristocratic and musical family. He was the son of Tommaso dei Cavalieri (c. 1509–1587), a close friend of Michelangelo. He probably received his early training there, and was working as an organist and music director in the period from 1578 to 1584. He spent much of his time in Rome as an organiser of Lenten oratorios. While in Rome he became associated with Cardinal Ferdinando I de' Medici.

In 1587, Ferdinando de' Medici succeeded his brother as Grand Duke of Tuscany, and in 1588 he brought Cavalieri to Florence as an overseer of artists, craftsmen and musicians. Cavalieri was master of ceremonies for the extremely opulent intermedi that the Medici family required for events such as weddings. Count Giovanni de' Bardi, the founder and patron of the Florentine Camerata, also collaborated on these productions. In May 1589, the festivities for the marriage of Grand Duke Ferdinando to Christina of Lorraine included a performance of Girolamo Bargagli's La pellegrina, with six especially elaborate intermedi. The 1st number of the final intermedio (6) was initially a piece by Bardi but was replaced in the actual intermedio by Cavalieri's virtuosic number based on the Aria del Gran Duca which became popular all over Europe and occurs in many arrangements and variations such as that made by Peter Philips in Antwerp. Cavalieri may have gotten some of his ideas for monody directly from Bardi, since Cavalieri was not a member of the Camerata during its period of activity a few years earlier. He may have developed his rivalry with Giulio Caccini, another extremely important and influential early monodist during this period.

In the 1590s, while still in Florence, Cavalieri produced several pastorales (a semi-dramatic predecessor to opera, set in the country, with shepherds and shepherdesses as common characters). In addition to his musical activities, he was employed as a diplomat during this time, assisting in papal politics, including buying the votes of key cardinals for the elections of popes Innocent IX and Clement VIII who were expected to favour the Medici.

During the 1590s he made frequent diplomatic trips to Rome, remaining active in the musical life there, and was connected with the Congregation of the Oratory of St Philip Neri. He premiered his famous Rappresentatione di Anima, et di Corpo... in February 1600; this piece is generally held to be the first oratorio. According to Roman records the piece was produced twice that year at the Oratorio de Filippini adjacent to Santa Maria in Vallicella, and was witnessed by thirty-five cardinals.

In 1600 Cavalieri produced Euridice, one of the first operas, by Jacopo Peri (libretto by Ottavio Rinuccini); this was part of an elaborate set of festivities for the wedding of Henry IV of France and Marie de' Medici. Unfortunately for Cavalieri, he was not given control of the main event, the production of Il rapimento di Cefalo—his rival Giulio Caccini took over from him—and he left Florence in anger, never to return.

Emilio de' Cavalieri died on 11 of March 1602 in Rome. He is buried in Cappella de' Cavalieri in Santa Maria in Ara Coeli. Emilio de' Cavalieri tomb disappeared during renovations in the 18th century. In March 2002 a replacement plaque commemorating his burial was placed in the chapel. The plaque states, in translation:

Emilio de' Cavalieri
Roman gentleman,
innovative and talented composer,
creator of the first operas,
superintendent of all the musicians
and artists at the court of the Medici,
conservator of the Roman senate and people.
Buried here 11 March 1602
On the four hundredth anniversary of his death

== Works ==
Cavalieri claimed to be the inventor of the stile rappresentativo, what is now usually known as monody, and he made the claim with considerable irritation: "everyone knows I am the inventor of [this style]", he said in a letter of 1600, "and I said so myself in print". Caccini seems to have got more of the credit, perhaps deservedly so, because of his early association with Bardi and Vincenzo Galilei in the 1570s in Florence, where the style was first discussed and probably invented. Comparing himself to Caccini, he said of their two styles: "[my] music moves people to pleasure and sadness, while theirs [i.e. Caccini's and Peri's] moves them to boredom and disgust."

Among Cavalieri's secular compositions were madrigals, monodies, and pieces he wrote for intermedi; his sacred compositions included a setting of the Lamentations of Jeremiah, and the Rappresentatione di Anima, et di Corpo. This work, probably the most historically important composition of Cavalieri to survive, consists of alternating speech, strophic songs, recitative-like sections and madrigalian parts; subsequent oratorios often used it as a starting-point. It is the first work to be published with a figured bass. Most importantly, however, it was an attempt to demonstrate, at musically conservative Rome, that the modern monodic style was consistent with the aims of the Counter-Reformation and could be adapted to a religious as opposed to a secular purpose. The quick adoption of the modern musical style by other Roman composers attests to its effectiveness in this regard. Cavalieri was followed by other Roman School composers of the 17th century who included Domenico Mazzocchi, Giacomo Carissimi and Alessandro Scarlatti.

Most of his music is in the most advanced style of the time. His four-part vocal music usually has a highly ornamented and expressive melodic line; the differentiation of the melodic line from the others is one of the defining features of the early Baroque. Some historians believed that Cavalieri was the originator of the trill. Sometimes he experimented with the enharmonic modulation, or enharmonic chromaticism which required equal temperament; apparently he built a special pipe organ in the 1590s for playing this kind of music.
