= Giambattista Andreini =

Italian actor and playwright (1576–1654)

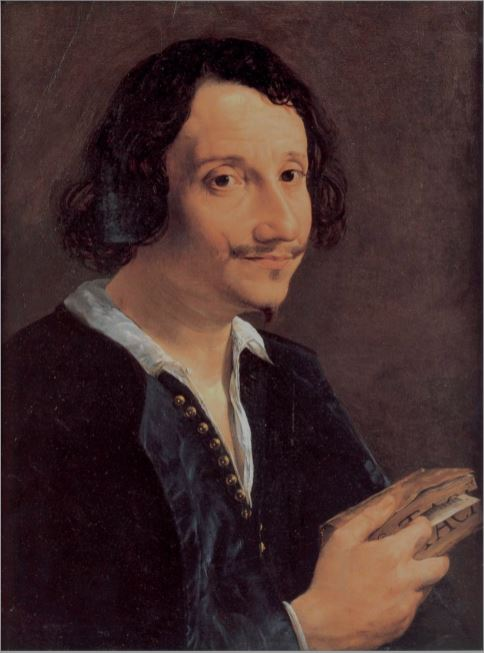
- Portrait of Giambattista Andreini reading a book by Tacitus by Angelo Caroselli
- Born: 9 February 1576; Florence, Grand Duchy of Tuscany
- Died: 7 June 1654 (aged 78); Reggio Emilia, Duchy of Modena and Reggio
- Occupation: Playwright, stage actor, poet, writer

Giambattista Andreini (9 February 1576 – 7 June 1654) was an Italian actor and the most important Italian playwright of the 17th century.

== Life ==
Born in Florence to stage stars Isabella Andreini and Francesco Andreini, he had a great success as a comedian in Paris under the name of Leylio. He was a favourite with Louis XIII, and also with the public, especially as the young lover.

His wife Virginia Ramponi-Andreini, whom he married in 1601, was also a celebrated actress and singer.

== Works ==
He left a number of plays full of extravagant imagination. The best known are L'Adamo (Milan, 1613), The Penitent Magdalene (Mantua, 1617), and The Centaur (Paris, 1622). From the first of these three extremely rare volumes, Italians have often asserted that Milton, travelling at that time in their country, took the idea of Paradise Lost.

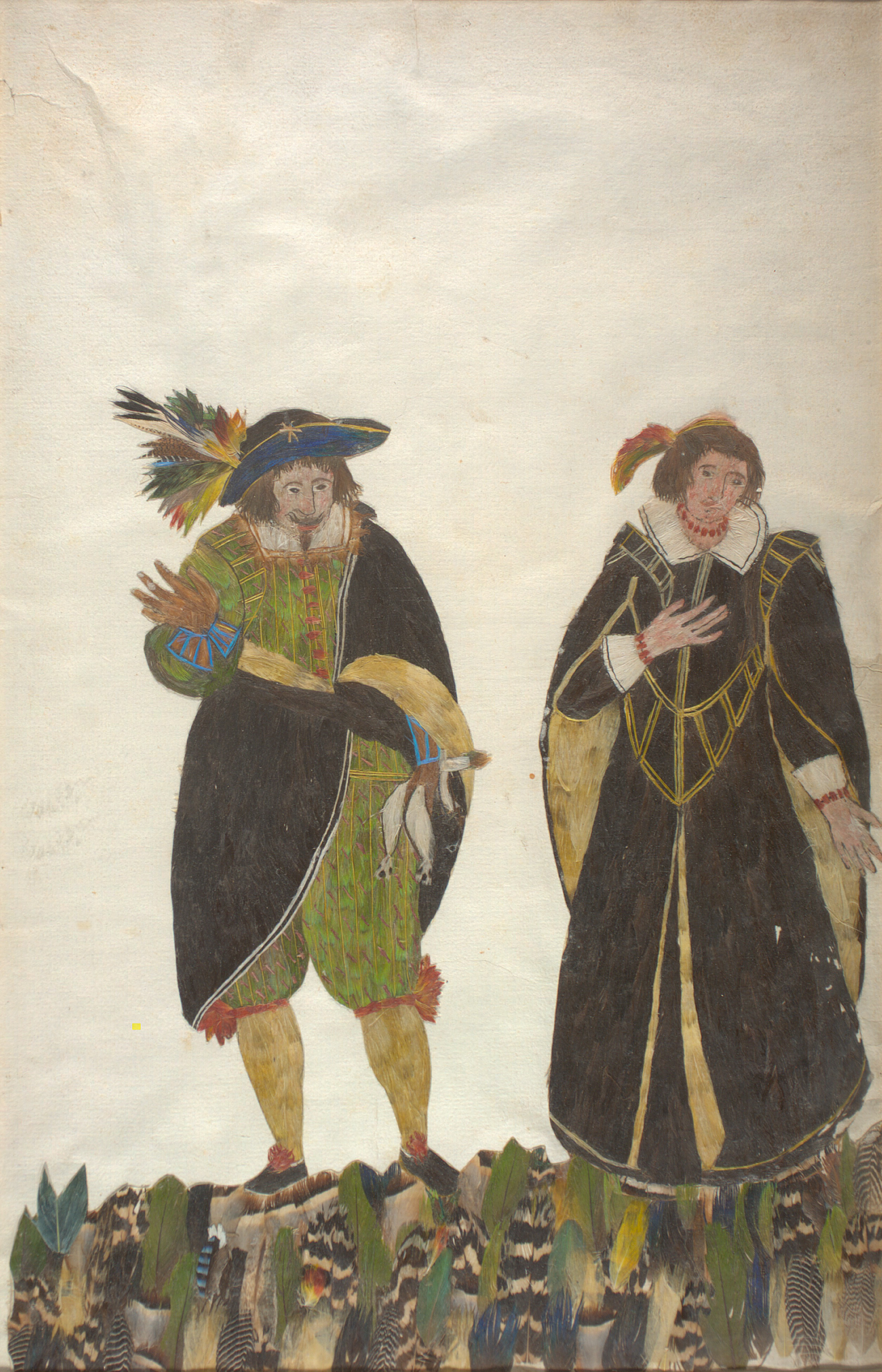
This image of commedia dell'arte actors from The Feather Book of Dionisio Minaggio is thought to depict Andreini as "Lelio" and his wife Virginia Ramponi-Andreini as "Florinda".

== Bibliography ==
- Katritzky, M. A. (2006). The Art of Commedia: A Study in the Commedia Dell'Arte 1560-1620, p. 245. Rodopi. ISBN 9042017988
- Snyder, Jon (2007). "Giovan Battista Andreini", vol. 1, pp. 36–38, in Encyclopedia of Italian Literary Studies, edited by Gaetana Marrone. New York/London: Routledge. ISBN 9781579583903.
