= Euridice (Peri) =

Earliest surviving opera

- Opera by: Jacopo Peri; Giulio Caccini
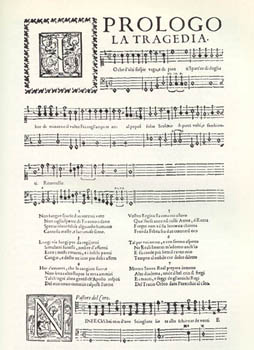
- The Prologue, from the score published in Florence in 1600
- Librettist: Ottavio Rinuccini
- Language: Italian
- Based on: Ovid's Metamorphoses
- Premiere: 6 October 1600; Palazzo Pitti, Florence

Euridice (Italian pronunciation: [euˈriːditʃe, euriˈdiːtʃe]; also Erudice or Eurydice) is an opera by Jacopo Peri, with additional music by Giulio Caccini. It is the earliest surviving opera, Peri's earlier Dafne being lost. (Caccini wrote his own "Euridice" even as he supplied music to Peri's opera, published this version before Peri's was performed, in 1600, and got it staged two years later.) The libretto by Ottavio Rinuccini is based on books X and XI of Ovid's Metamorphoses which recount the story of the legendary musician Orpheus and his wife Euridice.

The opera was first performed in Florence on 6 October 1600 at the Palazzo Pitti with Peri himself singing the role of Orfeo.

== Composition history ==
Euridice was created for the marriage of King Henry IV of France and Maria de Medici. The composition is typically considered to be the second work of modern opera, and the first such musical drama to survive to the present day. (The first, Dafne, was written by the same authors in 1597.)

Since both the libretto and score were dedicated to the new Queen of France, Marie de' Medici, some scholars have recognized a possible parallel between Euridice and Orfeo and the Queen and King of France. While the comparison is readily made, some scholars argue that the traits of King Henry IV are different from Orfeo, especially with respect to Orfeo's most famous deed. Orfeo loved Euridice so much that he journeyed to Hell and back, quite literally, to unite once more with his beloved wife while King Henry IV wouldn't travel as far as Florence to retrieve Medici.

At the premiere, many of the other roles were filled by members of Caccini's entourage, including his daughter Francesca Caccini. Peri composed all of the music for the first production, but owing to the integral involvement of Caccini and his performers, some of Peri's music was finally replaced by that of Caccini. When Caccini discovered that Peri intended to publish the opera with the added Caccini pieces, he rushed to finish his own version of Euridice using the same libretto, and managed to have his published before Peri's. In his preface, Peri notes that all of the music was completed by the date of the first performance earning his efforts the designation Prima Euridice.

In creating the music for Euridice, Peri envisioned a vocal style that is half sung and half spoken. For less dramatic parts he created vocal lines close to the style of spoken language set over a sustained accompaniment. For impassioned scenes he explored stronger and more rapid melodies with steadily changing harmonies. Peri's critics have observed that within the score of Euridice, he created no musically remarkable examples of either. However, he did use ranges and widths of register, as well as frequency and power of cadences, to distinguish different characters and dramatic moods. The voice and accompaniment are carefully paced to emphasize the tension and release in the text. Rhythmic and melodic inflections in the vocal lines closely, almost scientifically, imitate dramatic speech. In addition, impassioned exclamations are set with unprepared dissonances and unexpected movements in the bass.

All qualitative judgments aside, even his greater detractors admit that with Euridice Peri managed to establish sound principles for operatic composition. The work establishes in opera the dual resource of aria and recitative, and it explores the use of solo, ensemble and choral singing.

== Roles ==
Role	Voice type	Premiere cast 6 October 1600
La Tragedia	soprano castrato	"Giovannino del Signor Emilio" (de' Cavalieri), i. e. Giovannino Boccherini
Euridice	soprano	Vittoria Archilei
Orfeo	tenor	Jacopo Peri
Arcetro, a shepherd	contralto castrato	Antonio Brandi
Aminta, a shepherd	tenor	Francesco Rasi
Tirsi, a shepherd	tenor	Francesco Rasi
Caronte	bass	
Dafne, a messenger	boy soprano (en travesti)	Jacopo Giusti
Plutone	bass	Melchior Palantrotti
Proserpina	soprano castrato (en travesti)	Fabio, "castrato del Signor Emilio"
Radamanto	tenor	Piero Mon
Venere	soprano castrato (en travesti)	Fabio, "castrato del Signor Emilio"
Nymphs and shepherds, shades and deities of hell

== Synopsis ==
Peri's Euridice tells the story of the musician Orpheus and Euridice from Greek Mythology. According to myth, Orpheus was a great musician who journeyed to the underworld to plead with the gods to revive his wife Euridice after she had been fatally injured.

=== Act 1 ===
It opens with a simple melody by a singer representing the Tragic Muse, La Tragedia, and a short ritornello. Shepherds nearby and the Tragic Muse sing a conversation in recitatives and choruses, Daphne enters to notify everyone that Euridice has been fatally bitten by a serpent.

Scene 1

All of the nymphs and shepherds gather to celebrate the wedding of Orfeo and Euridice.

Scene 2

Orfeo is content after his wedding but is soon interrupted by Dafne. She brings the terrible news that Euridice has been bitten by a venomous snake and has died. Orfeo then vows to rescue her from the underworld.

Scene 3

Arcetro recounts that while Orfeo lay weeping, Venus, goddess of love, carries him off in her chariot.

=== Act 2 ===
This opens with Orpheus pleading with Venere, Plutone, Prosperina, Caronte, and Radamanto in the underworld for the return of his beloved wife Euridice. Nearly the entire scene is carried in recitative. When the act closes, Orpheus is back with Tirsi and the other shepherds.

Scene 4

Venus and Orfeo arrive at the gates of the underworld. Venus suggests that through his legendary voice he might persuade Pluto to return Euridice to life. Orfeo succeeds and is allowed to leave with his bride.

Scene 5

Orfeo and Euridice return from the underworld and rejoice.

== Musical numbers ==
Parts	Scenes	Individual works	Characters
Prologue	Scene 1	Prologo – Io, che d'alti sospir vaga e di pianti	La Tragedia
Act 1	Scene 1		
Act 1	Scene 1	Ninfe, ch'i bei crin d'oro	Pastore del coro, Ninfa del coro
Act 1	Scene 1	Vaghe ninfe amorose	Arcetro, Pastore del coro, Ninfa del coro
Act 1	Scene 1	Donne, ch'a' miei diletti	Euridice, Ninfa del coro
Act 1	Scene 1	Credi, ninfa gentile	Aminta, Pastore del coro
Act 1	Scene 1	In mille guise e mille	Euridice, Coro
Act 1	Scene 1	Al canto, al ballo, all'ombra, al prato adorno	Coro, Pastore del coro, Ninfa del coro, Altre Ninfe del coro
Act 1	Scene 2		
Act 1	Scene 2	Antri, ch'a' miei lamenti	Orfeo
Act 1	Scene 2	Sia pur lodato il ciel, lodato Amore	Arcetro, Orfeo
Act 1	Scene 2	Tirsi viene in scena sonando la presente Zinfonia	Orfeo, Tirsi
Act 1	Scene 2	Deh come ogni bifolco, ogni pastore	Arcetro, Orfeo
Act 1	Scene 2	Lassa! Che di spavento e di pietate	Dafne, Arcetro, Orfeo
Act 1	Scene 2	Per quel vago boschetto	Dafne, Arcetro
Act 1	Scene 2	Non piango e non sospiro	Orfeo
Act 1	Scene 2	Ahi! Mort' invid' e ria	Arcetro, Dafne, Ninfa del coro
Act 1	Scene 2	Sconsolati desir, gioie fugaci	Aminta, Ninfa del coro
Act 1	Scene 2	Cruda morte, ahi pur potesti	Coro, Ninfa del coro, Due Ninfa e un Pastore del coro
Act 1	Scene 3		
Act 1	Scene 3	Se fato invido e rio	Arcetro, Coro
Act 1	Scene 3	Con frettoloso passo	Arcetro, Dafne, Coro
Act 1	Scene 3	Io che pensato havea di starmi ascoso	Arcetro, Pastore del coro
Act 1	Scene 3	Se de' boschi i verdi onori	Coro
Act 1	Scene 3	Poi che dal bel sereno	Pastore del coro, Coro
Act 2
Act 2	Scene 4	Scorto da immortal guida	Venere, Orfeo
Act 2	Scene 4	L'oscuro varc'onde siam giunti a queste	Venere
Act 2	Scene 4	Funeste piagge, ombrosi orridi campi	Orfeo
Act 2	Scene 4	Ond'e cotanto ardire	Plutone
Act 2	Scene 4	Deh, se la bella Diva	Orfeo
Act 2	Scene 4	Dentro l'infernal porte	Plutone, Orfeo
Act 2	Scene 4	O Re, nel cui sembiante	Prosperpina
Act 2	Scene 4	A si soavi preghi	Orfeo, Plutone
Act 2	Scene 4	Sovra l'eccelse stelle	Caronte, Plutone, Orfeo
Act 2	Scene 4	Trionfi oggi pietà ne' campi inferni	Plutone, Orfeo,
Act 2	Scene 4	Poi che gl'eterni imperi	Deita D'Inferno primo coro, Secondo coro, Radamanto
Act 2	Scene 5	Già del bel carro ardente	Arcetro, Coro
Act 2	Scene 5	Voi, che sì ratt'il volo	Aminta, Coro, Arcetro
Act 2	Scene 5	Quand'al tempio n'andaste, io mi pensai	Aminta, Pastore del coro
Act 2	Scene 5	Chi può del cielo annoverar le stelle	Aminta, Arcetro
Act 2	Scene 5	Gioite al canto mio selve frondose	Orfeo, Ninfa del coro
Act 2	Scene 5	Quella, quella son io, per cui piangeste	Euridice, Ninfa del coro, Dafne, Arcetro, Orfeo, Aminta
Act 2	Scene 5	Modi or soavi or mesti	Orfeo
Act 2	Scene 5	Felice semideo, ben degna prole	Aminta
Act 2	Scene 5	Ritornello strumentale	Tutto il coro
Act 2	Scene 5	Biond' arcier, che d'alto monte	(ritornello instrumentale)

Various chorus names are as they appear in the original Italian score. Pastore, Ninfa/Ninfe, and Deita D'Inferno refer to choruses of shepherds, nymphs and Deities of Hell respectively.

== See also ==
- List of Orphean operas
