= Bonner Mitchell =

American literary historian

Marion Bonner Mitchell (28 November 1926 – 3 October 2014) was an American literary scholar specializing in French and Italian literature of the Renaissance period.

Mitchell was born in Livingston, Texas, on 28 November 1926 to parents Jewel Clarence and Verna Bonner Mitchell. He completed bachelor's and master's degrees at the University of Texas at Austin before obtaining a doctorate at Ohio State University. During his studies, Mitchell received the Fulbright Scholarship in Paris. He returned to the city for military service as a railway station interpreter during the Korean War. Mitchell joined the University of Missouri faculty in 1958, was later elected a fellow of the Royal Society of Arts and upon retirement, was granted emeritus status. He died on 3 October 2014.

== Selected publications ==
- Minor, Andrew C.; Mitchell, Bonner, eds. (1968). Renaissance Entertainment: Festivities for the Marriage of Cosimo I, Duke of Florence in 1539. University of Missouri Press. ISBN 9780826285225.
- Mitchell, Bonner (1973). Rome in the High Renaissance: The Age of Leo X. University of Oklahoma Press. ISBN 9780806110523.
- Mitchell, Bonner (1986). The Majesty Of The State: Triumphal Progresses Of Foreign Sovereigns In Renaissance Italy, 1494 1600. Olschki. ISBN 9788822234278.
- Mitchell, Bonner (1990). 1598: A Year of Pageantry in Late Renaissance Ferrara. Medieval & Renaissance Texts & Studies. ISBN 9780866980807.
