= Ottavio Rinuccini =

Ottavio Rinuccini (20 January 1563 – 28 March 1621) was an Italian poet, courtier, and opera librettist at the end of the Renaissance and beginning of the Baroque eras. In collaborating with Jacopo Peri to produce the first opera, Dafne, in 1597, he became the first opera librettist.

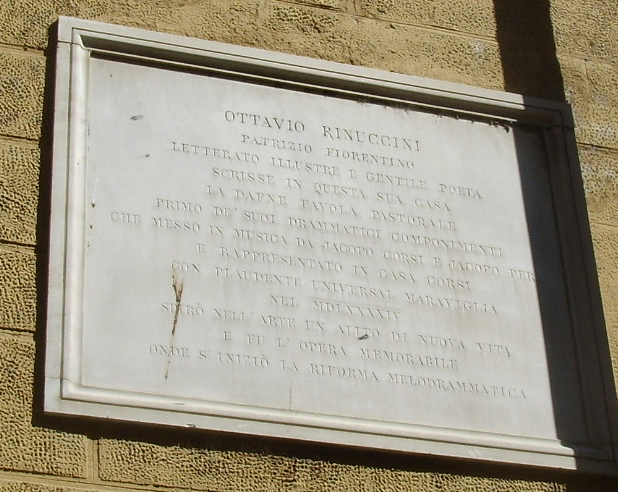
Commemorative plaque for Ottavio Rinuccini on the Via de' Rustici, Florence

He was born and died in Florence.

== Works ==
Rinuccini wrote texts for some of the intermedi at the performance of La pellegrina at the wedding of Ferdinand I de' Medici and Christine de Lorraine in May 1589.

Other works include:

- Libretto for Jacopo Peri's opera Dafne, first performed early in 1598.
- The pastorale, Euridice, used as the libretto for Peri's opera, Euridice, and Giulio Caccini's opera of the same name.
- Libretto for Claudio Monteverdi's L'Arianna, first performed in 1608.
- Libretto for Claudio Monteverdi's Il ballo delle ingrate, first performed in 1608.
- Libretto for Claudio Monteverdi's Zefiro torna e di soavi accenti.
- Filippo Bonaffino set some of his poetry to music in book of madrigals in 1623.
