= Settimia Caccini =

Italian composer

Settimia Caccini (6 October 1591 – c. 1638, Italy) was a well-known Italian soprano and composer during the 1600s, being one of the first women to have a successful career in music. Caccini was highly regarded for her artistic and technical work with music. She came from a family of well-known composers and singers, with her father being Giulio Caccini and her sister Francesca Caccini. Settimia Caccini was less well known as a composer because she never published her own collection of works. Instead, nine works are attributed to her in two manuscripts of secular songs. Settimia was known much more for her talent as a singer, and she performed for nobility with the Caccini family consort and as a soloist. Coming from a musical family, she was able to lead herself to her own fame and success.

== Life ==
Settimia Caccini was born on 6 October 1591, in Florence, Italy. Her father was a famous and popular composer and a pioneer in monodic music. At a young age her father taught her about music and composition. Her mother, Lucia Gagnolanti, was a singer as well, but died when Caccini was young. Caccini was the youngest child of three. Her sister Francesca also became quite a renowned composer, and she had an older brother, Pompeo Caccini, who was a singer. Growing up in a household of musicians led her to learn and master music at such a young age that it later led to her fame and her own success (it was common among families to pass an entire career to each member of the family).

Her father Giulio was employed by the Medici family, who ruled over much of Florence. Giulio passed down much of his career in to his family; he involved them in his music and even formed a singing family band. While working there Giulio was introduced to the concerto delle donne, a group of professional female singers hired by the court of Ferrara. It is presumed that Giulio persuaded the concerto delle donne to train his daughters to sing in the same manner as they did. Instead of singing solo which was widely popular at the time, Giulio insisted they were trained to sing as a group, called Il Concerto Caccini. Both Caccini and Francesca sang soprano. In 1600, the sisters sang in their father's opera Il rapimento di Cefalo for the wedding of Maria de' Medici and Henry IV of France.

Both Caccini and her sister grew up living very similar lives, performing together and learning how to sing and compose music together at the Medici theater. The family soon went their separate ways, each fulfilling their own music career. Caccini became famous as a solo artist in 1608 when she went to Mantua, where she sang the role of Venus, soprano, in Monteverdi's opera L'Arianna. During all of her success Caccini was offered many marriage proposals and employment offers, one being from the court of Mantua and from Enzo Bentivoglio in Rome, which she declined Instead, in 1609 Caccini married Lucca-born singer and composer Alessandro Ghivazzani (1572-c. 1632) and in the same year they both became employed by the Medici. In 1611 they left the Medici court and in 1612 they moved to Mantua to serve the Gonzaga court. Ghivazzani was employed in Mantua starting in 1622 and likely until his death in 1632.

After Ghivazzani's death Caccini returned to Florence where she rejoined the Medici court starting in 1636. She remained in the court until her death sometime around 1638 to 1640. Her date of death is uncertain; there are court documents that have her name on it until 1660, but that is generally assumed to refer to her daughter.

Caccini and Ghivazzani usually were always employed by the same employer and their work led them to many locations across Italy. Caccini lived in this manner until her husband died (somewhere between 1630 and 1636).

== Career and works ==
Caccini is mostly known for performing other composers' arias and starring in operas. She was a very well-known singer and highly regarded by her contemporaries. She was an active composer but none of her work was published by herself or while she was alive. She wrote quite a few pieces but most of them are lost to historians. She started composing music at a young age. In 1611 she composed her own piece for the Mascherate delle Ninfe della Senna carnival, which was one of the many masked carnivals in Venice. For the most part her career was performing for high nobility and royalty. She sang for Henry IV, the king of France, with her sister when she was younger.

When she was older she was employed at the court of Duke Ferdinando Gonzaga at Mantua with her husband in 1613. The Gonzaga family were a powerful family in Mantua at the time, and there are records indicating that she was valued highly because of the high pay she received. Next the couple found service in Parma under the service of Cardinal Farnese in 1622. In 1628 Caccini was sought after by Monteverdi in Parma. Caccini performed as Dido in one of Monteverdi's intermedi and as Aurora in "Mercurio e Marte." Monteverdi stated Caccini sang the arias with "superhuman grace and angelic voice".

Eight of Caccini's compositions survived, all of which are accompanied Italian monody. These pieces of music have expressive melodies and are usually performed by single singers with basso continuo accompaniment, perfect for her to sing for herself. These were a very popular style of Italian monody. Some of her arias are now published as piano arias, such as this book 4 Arias. Her most famous piece that was published was a 3-line aria called Gia sperai non spero hor piu. It was published in a 17th-century collection of historic music.

A few of Caccini's other works for soprano and basso continuo include "Core di questo core," "Cantan gl'augelli," and "Due luce ridenti."

== Bibliography ==
- Jackson, B. (1991). "Musical women of the seventeenth and eighteenth centuries". Collected Work: Women and music: A history. Bloomington, Indiana: Indiana University Press. ISBN 978-0-253-34321-5.
- Stras, Laurie (5 July 2017). "Musical portraits of female musicians at the northern Italian courts in the 1570s". In McIver, Katherine A. (ed.). Art and Music in the Early Modern Period: Essays in Honor of Franca Trinchieri Camiz. Taylor & Francis. pp. 145–172. ISBN 9781351575683.
- Schleifer, Martha Furman; Glickman, Sylvia, eds. (1996). Women Composers music through the ages. Vol. 1: Composers born before 1599. New York: G. K. Hall/Simon & Schuster Macmillan. ISBN 0816109265.
- Bennett, Judith M. (1989). Sisters and Workers in the Middle Ages. University of Chicago Press. ISBN 9780226042473.
- Caccini, Francesca (18 June 2004). Francesca Caccini's Il primo libro delle musiche of 1618: A Modern Critical Edition of the Secular Monodies. Indiana University Press. ISBN 9780253110091.
- Ferraro, Joanne M. (27 September 2001). Marriage Wars in Late Renaissance Venice. Oxford University Press. ISBN 9780198033110.
