= Francesco Rasi =

Italian opera singer

Francesco Rasi (14 May 1574 – 30 November 1621) was a Tuscan composer, singer (tenor), chitarrone player and poet.

Rasi was born in Arezzo. He studied at the University of Pisa and in 1594 he was studying with Giulio Caccini. He may have been in Carlo Gesualdo's retinue when he went to Ferrara for his wedding in 1594. In 1598 he joined the court of Duke Vincent I in Mantua, and probably served the Gonzaga family the rest of his life, with whom he travelled all over Italy and as far afield as Poland. He sang in the first performances of Jacopo Peri's Euridice and Caccini's Il rapimento di Cefalo in 1600. In 1607 he created the title role in Claudio Monteverdi's Orfeo, and in 1608 sang in the first performances of Marco da Gagliano's La Dafne.

In 1610 in Tuscany Rasi and his accomplices were sentenced to be hanged, drawn, and quartered for the murder of his stepmother's servant and the attempted murder of his stepmother; however because of the protection of the Gonzaga family he escaped, and his sentence was eventually annulled with the agreement that he never return to Arezzo, his birthplace.

He wrote an opera, Cibele, ed Ati, which seems not to have been performed and whose music does not survive, and another libretto, Elvidia rapita. He published poetry, including in the anthology La cetra di sette corde, and a good deal of monody which survives in the anthologies Vaghezze di musica (1608) and Madrigali (1610). Almost all of these are written for tenor voice, suggesting that they were written to display Rasi's own skill as a singer, and they follow in the style of Caccini's compositions.

Rasi was a well-respected singer, whose skill in ornamentation and diminution, beautiful voice, and ability to sing with grace and feeling, led to him being involved in the first performances of many of the first operas.

== Sources ==
- William V. Porter. "Francesco Rasi", Grove Music Online, ed. L. Macy (accessed July 10, 2007), grovemusic.com (subscription access).
- Susan Parisi. "Francesco Rasi (opera)", Grove Music Online, ed. L. Macy (accessed July 10, 2007), grovemusic.com (subscription access).
