= Il ballo delle ingrate =

- Ballet by Claudio Monteverdi
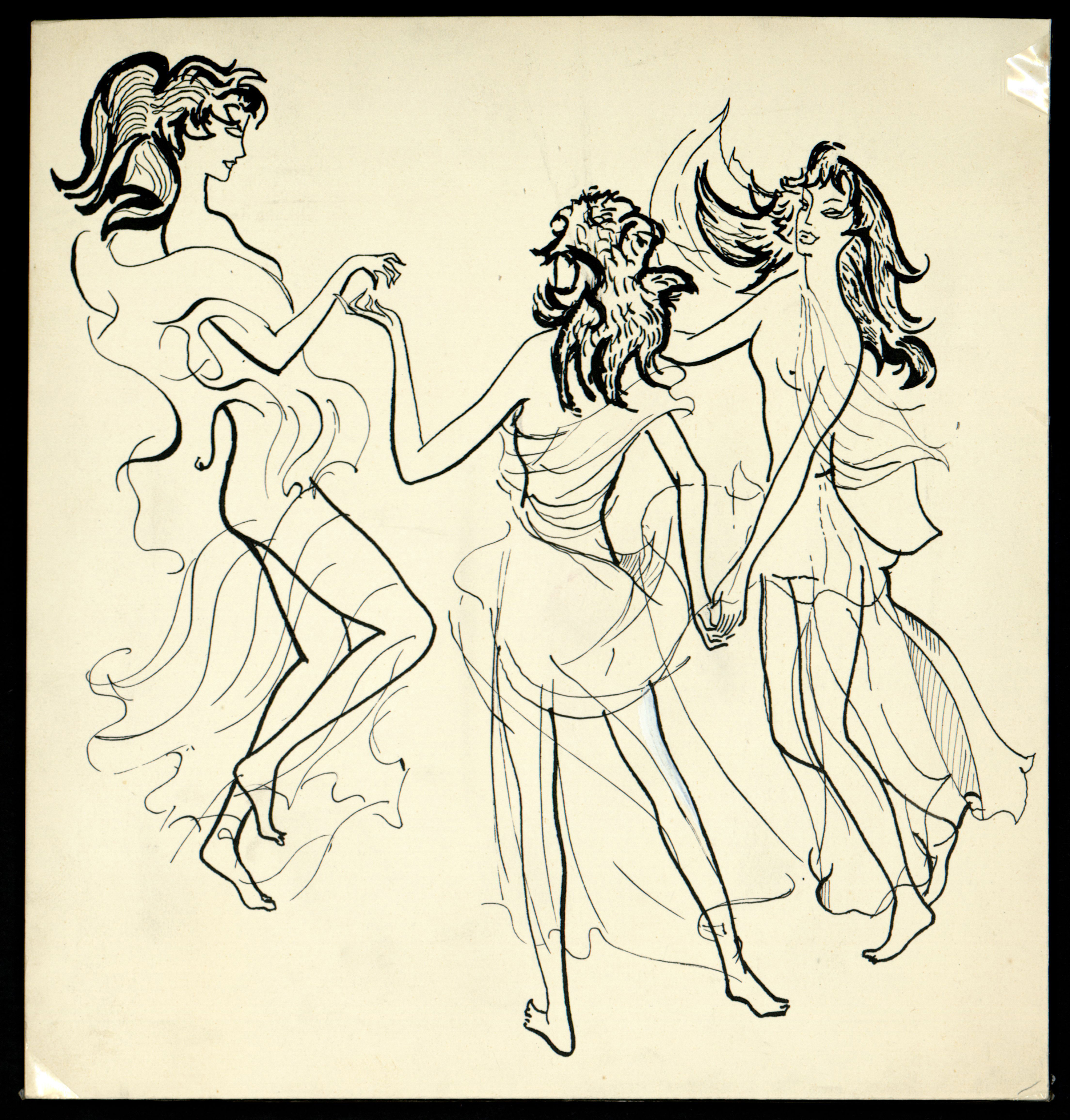
- Drawing for Il ballo delle ingrate by Peter Hoffer (1924-2000; undated).
- Occasion: Ducal wedding in Mantua
- Text: by Ottavio Rinuccini
- Language: Italian
- Performed: 4 June 1608
- Published: 1638

Il ballo delle ingrate (The Ballet of the Female Ingrates) is a semi-dramatic ballet by the Italian composer Claudio Monteverdi set to a libretto by Ottavio Rinuccini. It was first performed in Mantua on Wednesday, 4 June 1608 as part of the wedding celebrations for Francesco Gonzaga (the son of Monteverdi's patron Duke Vincenzo of Mantua) and Margaret of Savoy. Both Vincenzo and Francesco Gonzaga took part in the dancing. Monteverdi also composed the opera L'Arianna (to another libretto by Rinuccini) and the music for the prologue to Guarini's play L'idropica for the occasion.

Il ballo delle ingrate was published as part of Monteverdi's Eighth Book of Madrigals (Madrigali guerrieri, et amorosi) in 1638. This printed version probably contains revisions Monteverdi made for a revival in Vienna. The virtuosic bass writing for Plutone is closer in style to Monteverdi's late operas than to that of his Orfeo (1607). The musicologist Paolo Fabbri believes that the revisions were made for a performance to celebrate the coronation of Ferdinand III, Holy Roman Emperor in 1636. The sudden death of the previous emperor meant Monteverdi had to produce music at short notice, so he reworked Il ballo delle ingrate, removing the references to the Mantuan wedding.

== Roles ==
Cast	Voice type	Premiere, 4 June 1608
Venere (Venus)	soprano	
Amore (Cupid)	soprano	
Plutone (Pluto)	bass	
Una ingrata (A female ingrate)	soprano	

== Synopsis ==
The stage shows the mouth of the Underworld. Venus and Cupid visit Pluto, King of the Underworld, and complain that the arrows from Cupid's bow are no longer effective on the women of Mantua, who are scorning their lovers. Cupid asks Pluto to bring the spirits of women who rejected love up from the Underworld to show what fate awaits them in the afterlife. Pluto agrees and the spirits of the "female ingrates" enter and dance "two by two...with grave steps" as Pluto sings a warning to the women in the audience. As said ingrates return to the underworld, one of them sings a lament regretting she must leave the "pure and serene air."

== Recordings ==
- Il ballo delle ingrate (with Sestina) Les Arts Florissants, conducted by William Christie (Harmonia Mundi, 1982)
- Il ballo delle ingrate (with Il combattimento di Tancredi e Clorinda) Red Byrd, Parley of Instruments (Hyperion, 1992)
- Il ballo delle ingrate (with Il combattimento di Tancredi e Clorinda, Tirsi e Clori and Tempro la cetra) Ensemble Tragicomedia, conducted by Stephen Stubbs (Teldec, 1993)
- Il ballo delle ingrate (with Tirsi e Clori and music from L'Orfeo) Monteverdi Choir, English Baroque Soloists, conducted by John Eliot Gardiner (Erato, 1993)
- Il ballo delle ingrate (with Il combattimento di Tancredi e Clorinda and Tirsi e Clori) New London Consort, conducted by Philip Pickett (Decca L'Oiseau-Lyre, 1995)
- Il ballo delle ingrate (with Il combattimento di Tancredi e Clorinda) Capella Musicale di S. Petronio di Bologna, conducted by Serge Vartolo (Naxos, 1997)
- Il ballo delle ingrate (with Il combattimento di Tancredi e Clorinda), Concerto Italiano, conducted by Rinaldo Alessandrini (Opus 111, 1998)
- Il ballo delle ingrate (as part of a complete recording of Madrigali guerrieri ed amorosi - Monteverdi's Eighth Book of Madrigals) Concerto Vocale, conducted by René Jacobs (Harmonia Mundi, 2002)
- Il ballo delle ingrate (as part of a complete recording of Monteverdi's Eighth Book of Madrigals), La Venexiana, conducted by Claudio Cavina (Glossa, 2005)
- Il ballo delle ingrate, I Fagiolini and Barokksolistene conducted by Robert Hollingworth (Chandos, 2009)
- Il ballo delle ingrate (as part of a complete recording of Madrigali guerrieri ed amorosi - Monteverdi's Eighth Book of Madrigals), Delitiae Musicae, conducted by Marco Longhini (Naxos, 2017)

== Sources ==
- The Viking Opera Guide edited by Amanda Holden (Viking, 1993) p. 679
- Notes by Peter Holman to the Hyperion recording listed above (1992)
- Paolo Fabbri Monteverdi, translated by Tim Carter (Cambridge University Press, 1994)
