= The Pilgrim Woman =

Stage play

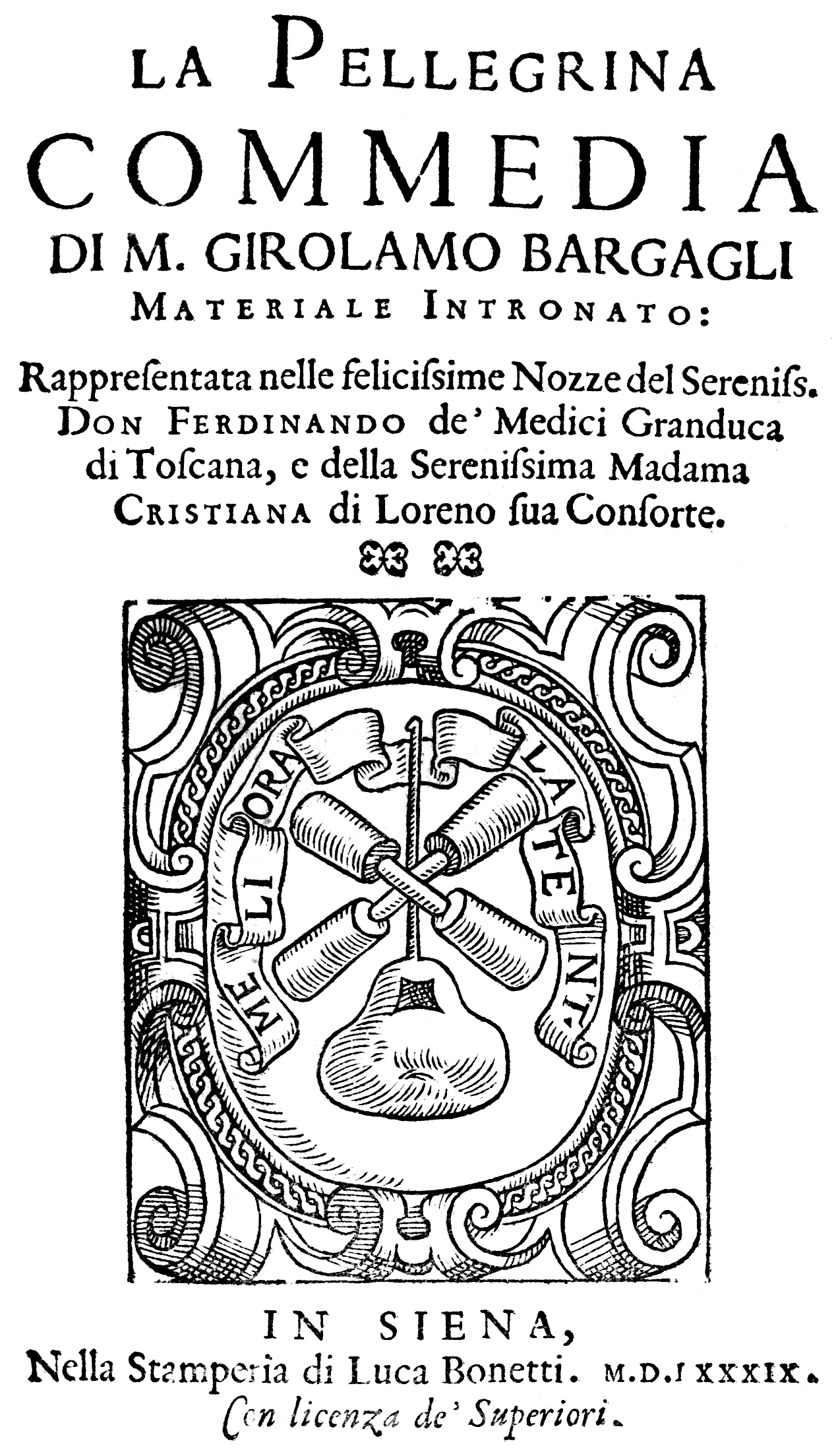
- First Edition 1589
- Original title: La pellegrina
- Written by: Girolamo Bargagli

Premiere
- Date: May 2, 1589
- Place: Florence

The Pilgrim Woman (La pellegrina) is a 1579 play written by Girolamo Bargagli of Siena that had been performed for the first time on 2 May 1589 in Florence, after the author's death in 1586, on the occasion of the marriage of Ferdinand I de' Medici, Grand-Duke of Tuscany, with Christina of Lorraine, granddaughter of the former queen-mother of France, Catherine de' Medici. This was enhanced with six musical interludes, the intermedi for La pellegrina, with designs by Bernardo Buontalenti, known as the master of Florentine spectacle. Six then-famous composers from Florence contributed music, including some of the most virtuosic vocal writing of the period, early examples of monody. The opening aria, Dalle piu alte sfere, is believed to be by Emilio de' Cavalieri (Palisca, Norton Anthology of Music/ Heller, Music in the Baroque, p 23), although it is sometimes attributed to Antonio Archilei, whose wife Vittoria had sung it in the role of Armonia in the 1589 production.

The intermedi have been played by the Huelgas Ensemble, in 1998; by the Hollands Vocaal Ensemble, in 2003; by the Capriccio Stravagante Renaissance Orchestra, in 2007; and, in selections, by Consort Astræa, in 2009. A staged version was mounted in 1989 in Minneapolis by the Ex Machina Baroque Opera Ensemble. In 2014 the Texas Early Music Project, in Austin, gave the first U.S. performance of the 21st century.
