= Jacopo Peri =

Italian composer and singer (1561–1633)

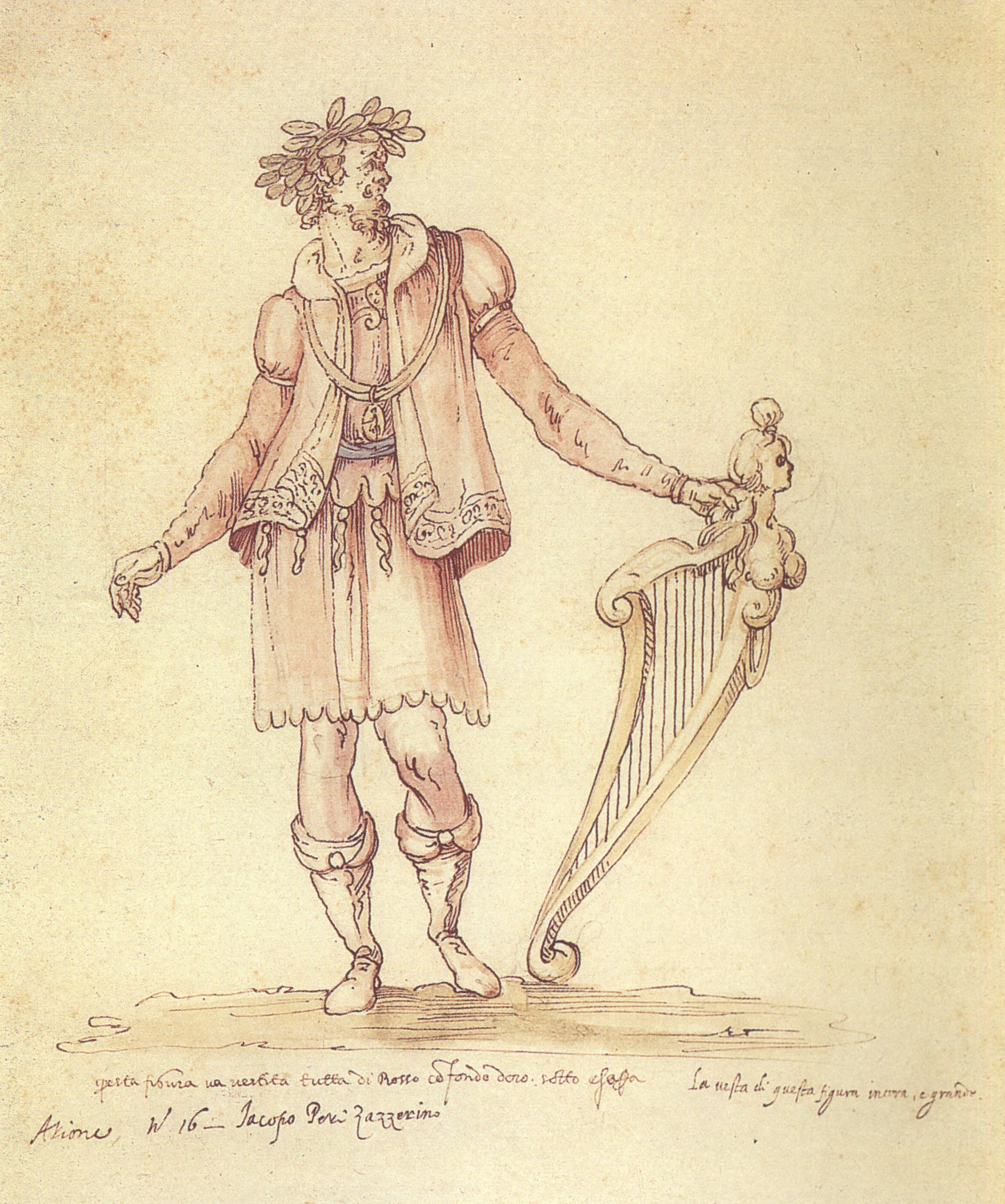
- Jacopo Peri
- Born: 20 August 1561; Rome or Florence
- Died: 12 August 1633 (aged 71); Florence, Grand Duchy of Tuscany
- Occupations: Composer; singer; instrumentalist

Jacopo Peri (Italian: [ˈjaːkopo ˈpɛːri]; 20 August 1561 – 12 August 1633) was an Italian composer, singer, and instrumentalist of the late Renaissance and early Baroque periods. He wrote what is considered the first opera, the mostly lost Dafne (c. 1597), and also the earliest extant opera, Euridice (1600).

He is sometimes known by the byname ll Zazzerino (lit. 'the blond one').

== Life and career ==
Jacopo di Antoni di Franceso Peri was born in either Rome or Florence to a middle-class family. Peri himself claimed to be from Rome, but considering the pro-Roman sentiments of the reigning Fernando de'Medici, grand duke of Tuscany, it was considered a disadvantage to be known as a Florentine. This may have motivated Peri to lie about his true birthplace. Nonetheless, he was employed to sing at the Servite monastery of Santissima Annunziata in the city of Florence. He likely received an education from the monastery school as well. Due to its size and favour with the Medici court, which attended mass there each week, Santissima Annunziata was seen as pipeline for musical students to develop their careers and acquire patronage. Because of his talent and education, Peri was able to study in Florence with Cristofano Malvezzi, and went on to work in a number of churches there, both as an organist and as a singer. He subsequently began to work in the Medici court around September 1588, first as a tenor singer and keyboard player, and later as a composer. His earliest works were incidental music for plays, intermedi, and madrigals.

In the 1590s, Peri became associated with Jacopo Corsi, the leading patron of music in Florence. They believed contemporary art was inferior to that of classical Greece and Rome, and decided to attempt to recreate Greek tragedy as they understood it. Their work added to that of the Florentine Camerata of the previous decade, which produced the first experiments in monody, the solo song style over continuo bass which eventually developed into recitative and aria. Peri and Corsi brought in the poet Ottavio Rinuccini to write a text, and the result, Dafne, is seen as the first work in a new form, opera.

Rinuccini and Peri next collaborated on Euridice. This was first performed on 6 October 1600 at the Palazzo Pitti for the wedding of Princess Marie de' Medici and Henry IV. Unlike Dafne, it has survived to the present day (though it is hardly ever staged, and then only as a historical curio). The work made use of recitatives, a new development which went between the arias and choruses and served to move the action along.

Peri produced a number of other operas, often in collaboration with other composers such as La Flora with Marco da Gagliano. Peri also wrote a number of other pieces for various court entertainments. Few of his pieces are still performed today, and even by the time of his death, his operatic style was considered old-fashioned compared to the work of relatively younger reformist composers such as Claudio Monteverdi. Peri's influence on those later composers, however, was considerable.

== Works ==
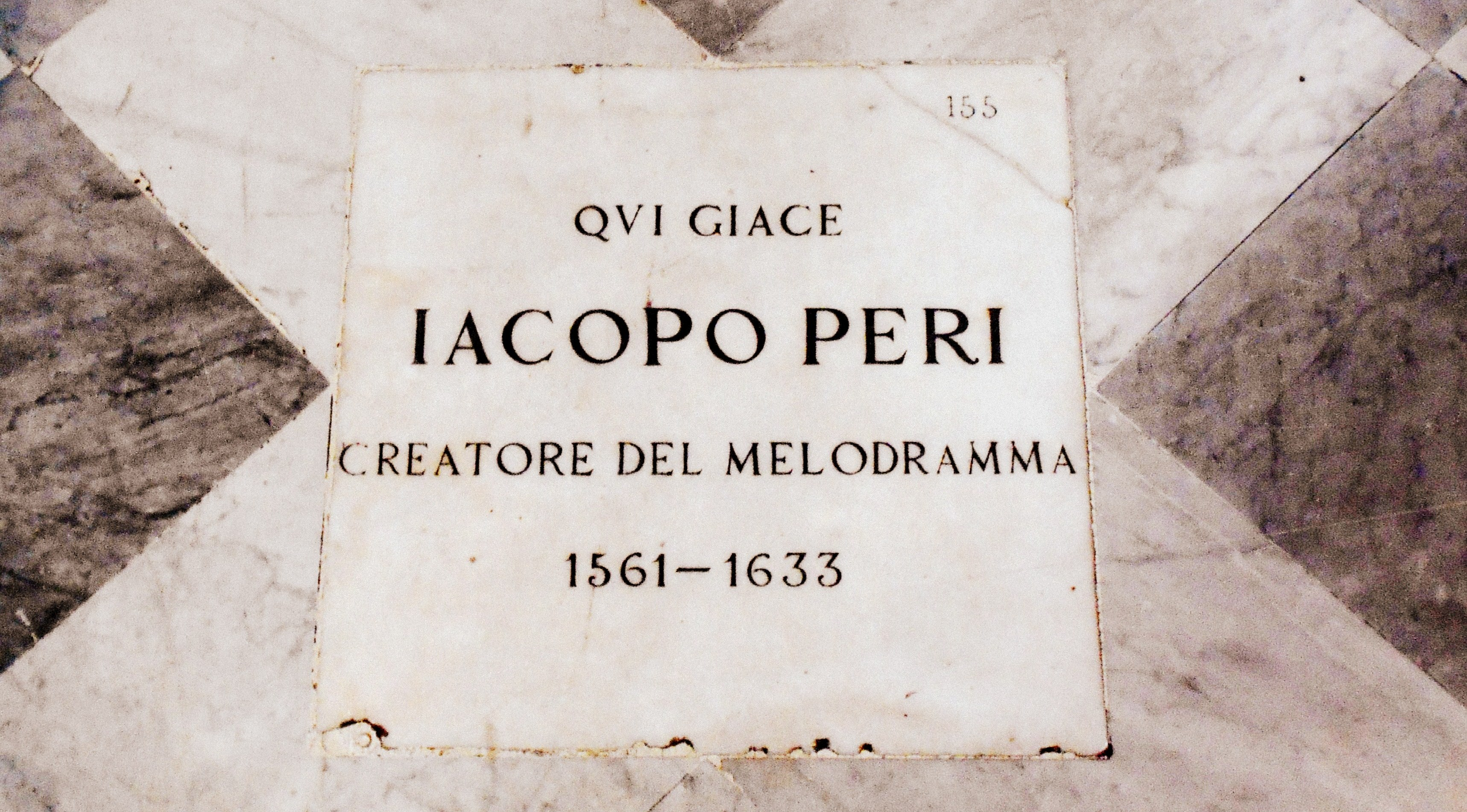
Gravestone in Santa Maria Novella

- Jacopo Peri: Ai Lettori. Introduzione a 'Le Musiche sopra l'Euridice', revisione e note di Valter Carignano
- Jacopo Peri: Le Musiche sopra l'Euridice. Revisione e Note di Valter Carignano, L'Opera Rinata, Torino
