= La Flora =

Opera by Marco da Gagliano and Jacopo Peri

La Flora, o vero Il natal de' fiori
- Opera by: Marco da Gagliano; Jacopo Peri
- Frontispiece by Alfonso Parigi for the libretto, published in 1628
- Translation: Flora, or The Birth of Flowers
- Librettist: Andrea Salvadori
- Language: Italian
- Premiere: 14 October 1628; Teatro Mediceo, Florence

La Flora, o vero Il natal de' fiori (Flora, or The Birth of Flowers) is an opera in a prologue and five acts composed by Marco da Gagliano and Jacopo Peri to a libretto by Andrea Salvadori. It was first performed on 14 October 1628 at the Teatro Mediceo in Florence to celebrate the marriage of Margherita de' Medici and Odoardo Farnese, Duke of Parma. Based on the story of Chloris and Zephyrus in Book V of Ovid's Fasti, Salvadori's libretto contains many allegorical references to the transfer of political power, the beauty of Tuscany, and the strength of the Medici dynasty. The score of La Flora is one of only two still in existence out of Gagliano's 14 published stage works. Several of its arias are still performed as concert pieces.

== Background ==
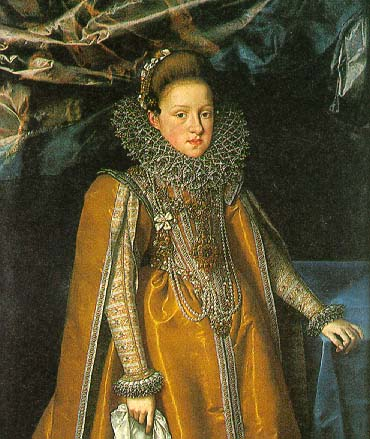
Grand Duchess Maria Maddalena

The path to the wedding of Margherita de' Medici and Odoardo Farnese, and to the opera which was to be a key part of the celebrations, was not a smooth one. Their marriage had been contracted in 1620 when they were both children and was intended to strengthen the alliance between Florence and Parma. There were two failed attempts by the Medici family to break the contract along the way, first in 1624 by Margherita's mother Grand Duchess Maria Maddalena who had preferred her nephew Prince Wladyslaw of Poland and later by Margherita's brother, Ferdinando II, who had favoured Gaston, Duke of Orléans. However, Parma held firm, and although an official date for Margherita and Odoardo's wedding had still not been set by mid-1627, preparations went ahead for the festivities, including an opera to be performed in the Teatro Mediceo (once part of the Uffizi Palace).

The libretto for La Flora was written by Andrea Salvadori, who had been employed by the Medici as their court poet since 1616 and had provided the texts and libretti for numerous musical spectacles there, both sacred and secular. The opera he had originally planned for the wedding celebrations was Iole ed Ercole (Iole and Hercules) for which Jacopo Peri had already composed the music by the end of 1627. However, during that time Salvadori was engaged in a feud with the singer and composer, Francesca Caccini. According to contemporary accounts, Caccini took her revenge by convincing Maria Magdalena and her daughter that the subject of the opera might be interpreted as reflecting Margherita's desire to control her new husband. Salvadori had to write a new libretto, this time basing it on the tale of the field nymph Chloris and the wind god Zephyrus as recounted in Book V of Ovid's Fasti. (Ovid's version attributed the origin of the goddess Flora to the marriage of Zephyrus and Chloris which transformed the nymph into a goddess.) Marco da Gagliano, who had previously collaborated with Salvadori on several works, composed all the music for La Flora apart from that sung by Clori (Chloris), which was composed by Jacopo Peri.

Maria Maddalena took an active role in the planning of the production. She secured the services of the musicians and singers, attended the rehearsals, and according to the musicologist Kelley Harness, may well have contributed to the development of the plot which contains many allegorical references to the transfer of political power, the beauty of Tuscany, and the strength of the Medici dynasty.

== Performance history ==
La Flora was performed on 14 October 1628, three days after the wedding of Margherita de' Medici and Odoardo Farnese, and was the last major spectacle to be staged in the Teatro Mediceo. The lavish production was designed by Alfonso Parigi, who also produced engravings of the major scenes from the opera to illustrate the libretto which was published in the same year as a festival book. Marin Mersenne writing in L'Harmonie universelle (1637) described the reactions of those who attended:

The spectatators declared that they had never heard nor seen anything like it, either for the beauty of the recitative that each actor gave in reciting and singing on the stage, or for the majesty of the poetry, or for the richness, and the machines that represented the thunders and lightenings, and other storms with such perfection that the spectators remained astounded and ravished.

In early 17th century Italy, works specifically composed to be performed privately in court theatres for royal occasions (especially those involving lavish spectacle) were rarely repeated. La Flora was no exception. However, it did receive at least one staging in modern times when it was performed in 2002 at the Teatro Comunale in Fontanellato by I Madrigalisti Farnesiani and Collegium Farnesianum conducted by Marco Faelli. Two reduced forms of the libretto, under the title Natale de' Fiori and intended for performance as a comic play without music, were published in Milan in 1667 (by the actors Pietro Ricciolini and Ambrogio Broglia) and in Venice in 1669 (by the actress Domenica Costantini). Several theatre scholars have suggested that the libretto, along with Parigi's stage designs, may also have been a key source for Ben Jonson's 1631 masque, Chloridia.

Of Gagliano's 14 published operas, only La Dafne (1608) and La Flora have extant scores. Several arias from La Flora have since been published separately and are still performed as concert pieces including "Lamento di Clori" (Clori's Lament, composed by Peri); Corilla's aria "Io era pargoletta" (I was a little child); and Mercury's lullaby "Dormi, Amore" (Sleep, Amor). Ezio Pinza, who performed "Dormi, Amore" in several concerts and on The Bell Telephone Hour, recorded it for Columbia Records in 1945.

== Roles ==
La Flora also included five extended dances (balli), one in each act. The names of the dancers, singers and musicians who took part in the opera's first performance are largely unknown, apart from the castrato singer Loreto Vittori (1600–70) and the musician Andrea Falconieri, who like Vittori had been imported from Rome.

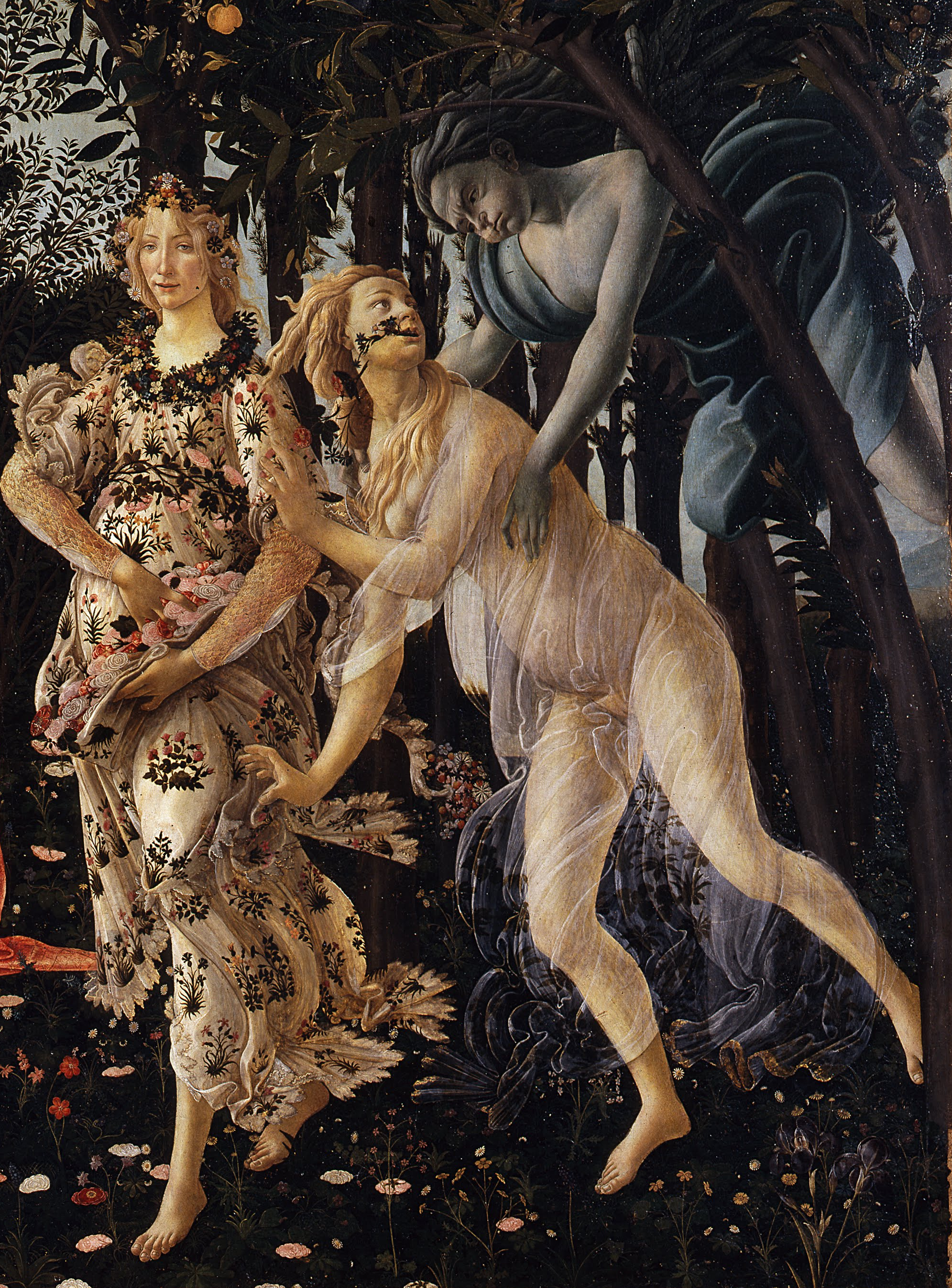
Chloris and Zephyrus depicted in Botticelli's 1482 painting Primavera

Role	Voice type
Imeneo (Hymen), god of marriage ceremonies	tenor
Mercurio (Mercury), messenger of the gods	contralto
Berecinzia (Cybele), Earth goddess	soprano
Zeffiro (Zephyrus), god of the west wind	soprano
Venere (Venus), goddess of love and beauty	soprano
Amore (Amor), god of desire and erotic love	soprano
Clori (Chloris), a nymph, later called "Flora"	soprano
Corilla, a nymph and Clori's companion	soprano
Pane (Pan), god of the shepherds	tenor
Lirindo, a shepherd in love with Corilla	tenor
Tritone (Triton), a sea god	tenor
Pasitea, Aglaia and Talìa (Pasithea, Aglaea, and Thalia), the Three Graces	sopranos
Plutone (Pluto), god of the underworld	bass
Eaco, Radamanto, and Minosse (Aeacus, Rhadamanthus, and Minos), judges in Hades	tenors
Gelosia, Jealousy	contralto
Austro (Auster), god of the south wind	tenor
Borea (Boreas), god of the north wind	tenor
Satiro, a satyr	tenor
Nettuno (Neptune), god of the sea	tenor
Giove (Jove), king of the gods	tenor
Apollo (Apollo), god of light and the sun	tenor
Napaeae, Sylvans, Tritons, Nereids, Satyrs, Cupids, Aurae, Tempestates, and infernal deities

== Synopsis ==
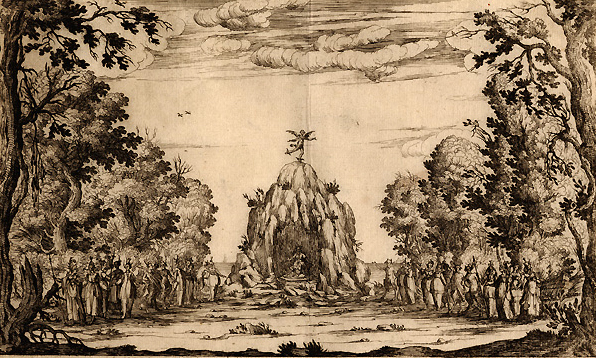
Alfonso Parigi's stage design for the opening of Act 1 with Cybele's grotto in the distance

Setting: The Tuscan countryside in ancient times

Prologue

Hymen (Imeneo) sings the praises of the newly wed Margherita de' Medici and Odoardo Farnese and their respective states, Tuscany and Parma. He augurs a long, happy and fertile marriage for them and offers for their delight the love story of Chloris (Clori) and Zephyrus (Zeffiro).

Act 1

Mercury (Mercurio) summons the Earth goddess Cybele (Berecinzia). A mountain slowly opens and she appears in her grotto. Mercury announces Jove's decree that Earth shall have flowers, just as the heavens have stars, and that these flowers will be born of the union of Chloris, a nymph of the Tuscan fields, and Zephyrus, god of the spring wind. Zephyrus tells Venus (Venere) of his love for Chloris. She in turn tells him that she will ensure that his pursuit of the nymph will be successful. Amor (Amore) expresses his displeasure at this and vows to thwart Zephyrus. Venus sends him away. Pan (Pane) pursues Corilla, a nymph and Chloris's friend. Corilla rejects him because of his ugliness and proclaims her love for the shepherd, Lirindo. Pan is furious and blames Amor. Tritons and Nereids remonstrate with Pan and sing the praises of Amor, Venus, and the Sun as they perform a dance.

Act 2

Zephyrus woos Chloris, "Giovinetta, che si dolce" (Young girl, who so sweetly), but she tells him that she has renounced love and wishes to emulate the chaste goddess Diana. Amor complains bitterly to Mercury about Venus usurping his power to determine who falls in love. Mercury summons the Three Graces and together they sing a lullaby to him, "Dormi, Amore" (Sleep, Amor). As soon as he falls asleep, Mercury makes off with his bows and arrows and his torch. The satyrs come upon Amor and dance around him as they ridicule him for allowing his weapons to be stolen.

Act 3

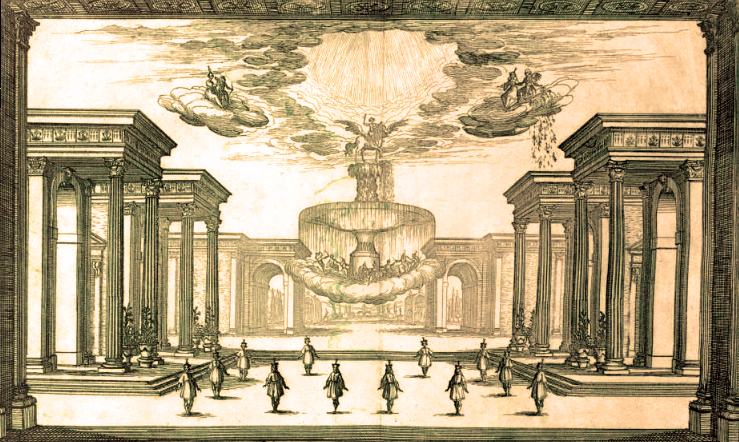
Parigi's stage design for the finale of Act 5 showing the Dance of the Breezes. In the background, Apollo on Pegasus above the Muses' fountain. To the right, Amor's tears fall to earth as flowers

Corilla sings of her love for Lirindo, "Io era pargoletta" (I was a little child). Lirindo joins her and likewise sings of his love for her. She then tells Lirindo that Chloris is now deeply in love with Zephyrus and wonders what has brought about her friend's change of heart. Lirindo explains that Mercury had brought Amor's stolen weapons to Venus, who used his golden bow and arrow to make Chloris fall in love with Zephyrus. On hearing this from Chloris herself, Amor confronts Venus demanding his weapons back, but she tells him that she has given the golden bow to Jove, thrown his leaden bow into the sea, and kept his torch for herself. In a fury, Amor descends to Hades and brings Jealousy (Gelosia) back to Earth with him. Pan once again complains to Triton about the perfidy and hatefulness of women, who again remonstrates with him. A chorus of cupids arrive to taunt Pan as they sing and dance around him.

Act 4

At Amor's instigation, Pan (falsely) tells Chloris that Zephyrus has been unfaithful to her. Heartbroken, she drives Zephyrus away, leaving the Tuscan lands in the grip of Auster (Austro) and Boreas (Borea), the gods of the north wind and south winds. The sky darkens and they bring down enormous storms with thunder, lightning, and hail. The Napaeae and Nereids lament the ruination of the fields and forests and flee. The act ends with a violent Dance of the Storms.

Act 5

The gods intervene to restore order. Jove returns Amor's golden bow and Neptune (Nettuno) brings back the leaden one which Venus had thrown into the sea. Chloris laments her fate, contrasting it to Corilla and Lirindo's happiness and expresses her desire for death, "Fortunata Corilla" (Fortunate Corilla). At Venus and Mercury's urging, Amor realizes the error of his ways and tells the truth to Chloris. The love of Chloris and Zephyrus now restored, spring returns. Amor weeps and where his tears fall to Earth flowers appear. Zephyrus gives Chloris a new name, Flora, and transforms her into the goddess of springtime and flowers. She then sings of the future grandeur of Florence. Apollo appears riding Pegasus as the Muses bring the Hippocrene Fountain to water the flowers. Apollo praises the lily, a symbol of both Florence and the House of Farnese. The opera ends with the Dance of the Breezes.

== Recordings ==
La Flora - Clarissa Reali, Valeria La Grotta, Mauro Borgioni, Marta Fumagalli, Arianna Stornello, Allabastrina, Elena Sartori. 2CD Glossa 2023
