= Loreto Vittori =

Italian composer

Loreto Vittori (5 September 1600 (baptized) – 23 April 1670) was an Italian castrato and composer. From 1622 until his death, he was a mezzo-soprano singer in the papal chapel in Rome.

== Life ==
Vittori was born in Spoleto and educated in Rome. He then worked as a singer in Loreto and Spoleto. In 1618 Vittori was placed under the protection of the Medici family. He moved to Rome in 1621, first in the service of Cardinal Ludovico Ludovisi, nephew of Pope Gregory XV, and in 1632 in the service of Cardinal Antonio Barberini, nephew of the future Urban VIII. He died in Rome, aged 69.

Vittori sang at the premiere of Lo Sposalizio di Medoro et Angelica by Jacopo Peri and Marco da Gagliano in 1619, possibly as Angelica. He was Saint Ursula in La Regina Sant'Orsola by Marco da Gagliano in 1624. Back in Rome, the man was Falsirena in La Catena d'Adone by Domenico Mazzocchi in 1626. In 1628, Vittori took an unknown role in La Flora, ovvero Il natal de' fiori (Flora, or The Birth of Flowers), an opera composed by Marco da Gagliano and Jacopo Peri to a libretto by Andrea Salvadori. He also performed at the wedding festivities of Margherita de' Medici to Odoardo Farnese in Parma, probably as Galatea in the intermezzo Mercurio e Marte by Claudio Monteverdi.

In 1637, Vittori sang in Chi Soffre, Speri by Marco Marazzoli and Virgilio Mazzocchi, possibly as Virtu and Alvida. His final stage appearance was as Angelica in Il palazzo incantato by Luigi Rossi with libretto by Cardinal Rospigliosi, the future Clement IX.

Bernardo Pasquini was among his pupils.

== Works ==
- In 1639 he wrote a spectacular opera entitled La Galatea, rediscovered and revived in 2005. La Galatea is peopled with multi-dimensional characters and contains moments of great dramatic intensity, the reason, perhaps, for the unusually warm praise it received from music historians in the early part of the twentieth century.
- He composed the sacred drama Sant'Ignazio di Loyola, which is lost; two sacred dramas entitled Santa Irene (1644) and La Pellegrina Costante (1647);
- the play La Fiera di Palestrina; a comedy Le Zittelle Cantarini, a collection of monodies and Dialoghi Sacri e Morali.
- A mock-heroic poem, La Troja Rapita, (1662). an autobiographical poem that contains important information on the environment of the Roman Barberini in the days of Pope Eugenius IV.
