= Angelica and Medoro =

Subjects of romantic painters, composers and writers

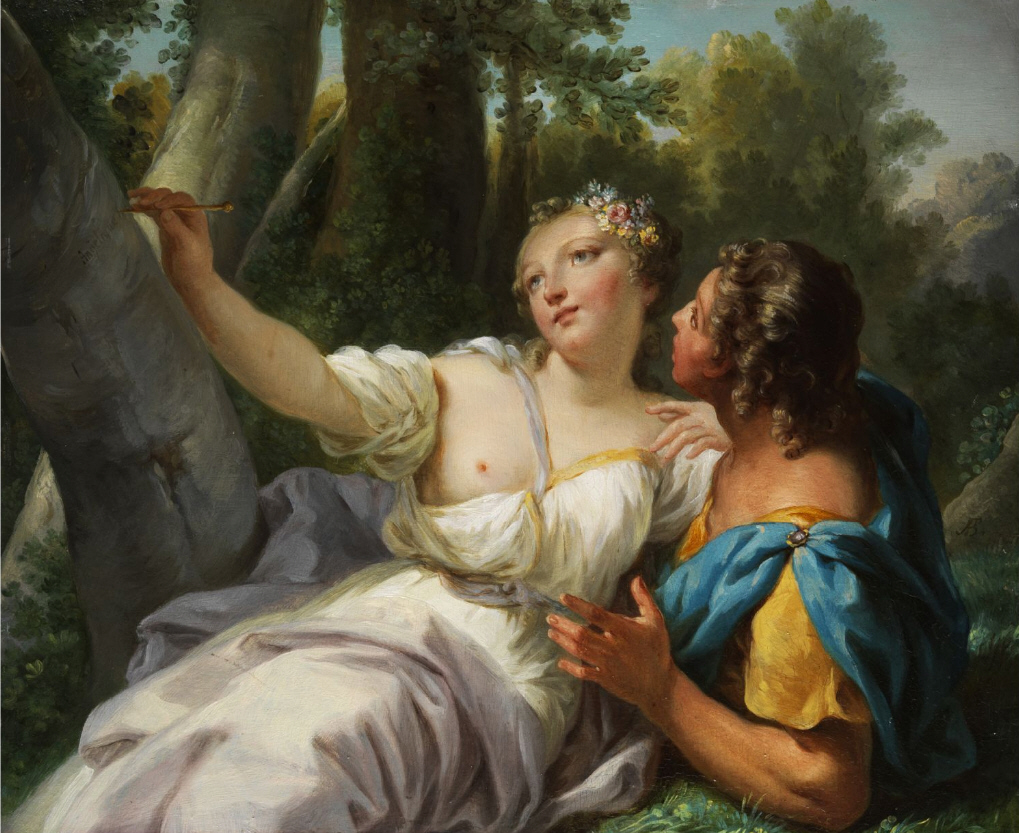
Jean-Baptiste Bénard, Angelica carves Medoro's name, before 1789

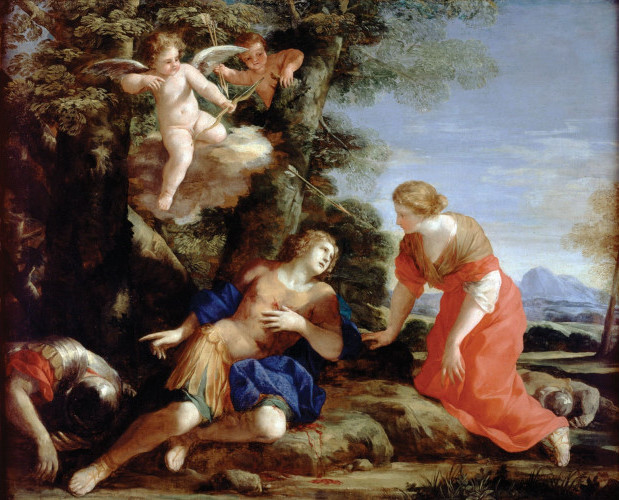
Angelica encountering the wounded Medoro, Giovanni Francesco Romanelli, 1646-48

Angelica and Medoro was a popular subject for Romantic painters, composers and writers from the 16th until the 19th century. Angelica and Medoro are two characters from the 16th-century Italian epic Orlando Furioso by Ludovico Ariosto; itself a continuation of the story told in the earlier epic poem Orlando Innamorato by Matteo Maria Boiardo. Both Boiardo and Ariosto's poems were inspired by the French medieval literature known as the Matter of France. The character of Angelica was a fictional creation by Boiardo, whose story was continued by Ariosto. The character of Medoro was invented by Ariosto, and was not found in Boiardo's poem.

Angelica was an Asian princess at the court of Charlemagne who fell in love with the Saracen knight Medoro, and eloped with him to China. While in the original work Orlando was the main character, many adaptations focused purely or mainly on the love between Angelica and Medoro, with the favourite scenes in paintings being Angelica nursing Medoro, and Angelica carving their names into a tree, a scene which was the theme of at least 25 paintings between 1577 and 1825.

According to Grove Music Online, more than 50 operas featuring the characters Angelica and Medoro were created during the 17th, 18th and 19th centuries. Common titles of opera libretti with these characters that were set by more than one composer include: Angelica e Medoro, Orlando furioso, Orlando, Roland, Orlando paladino and Le pazzie di Orlando. The faithfulness of the various opera adaptations to the original epic poems by Boiardo and Ariosto varied.

== Story overview ==
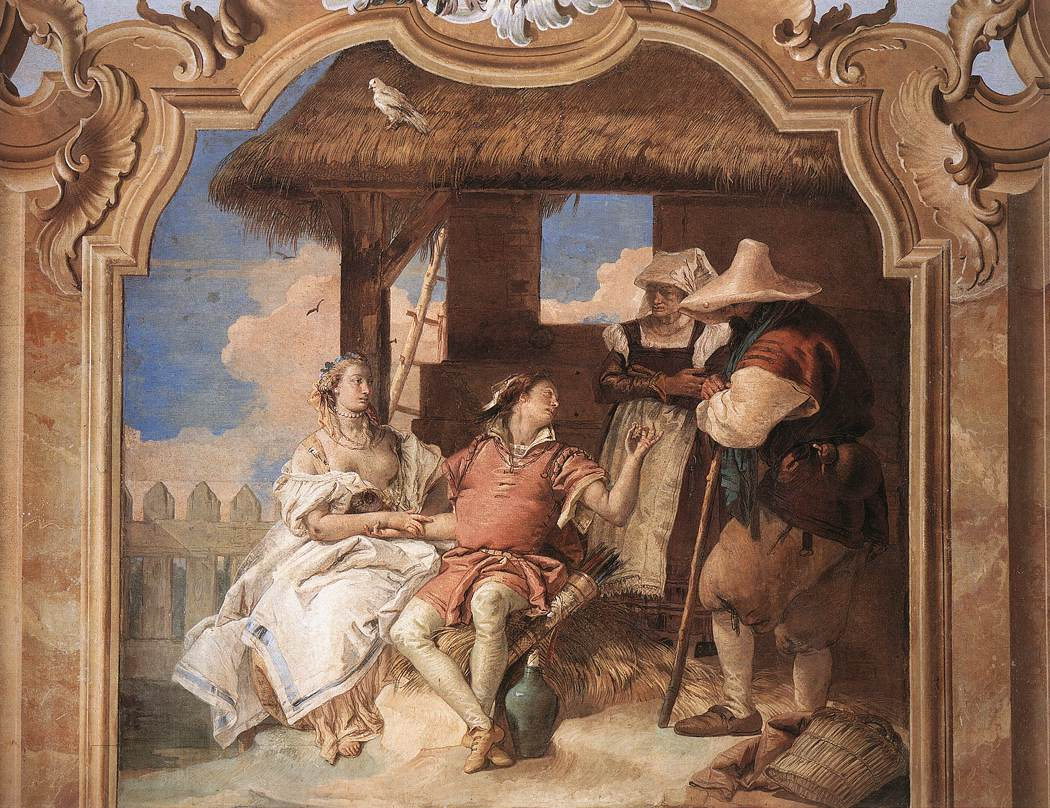
Giovanni Battista Tiepolo, Angelica and Medoro with the Shepherds, 1757

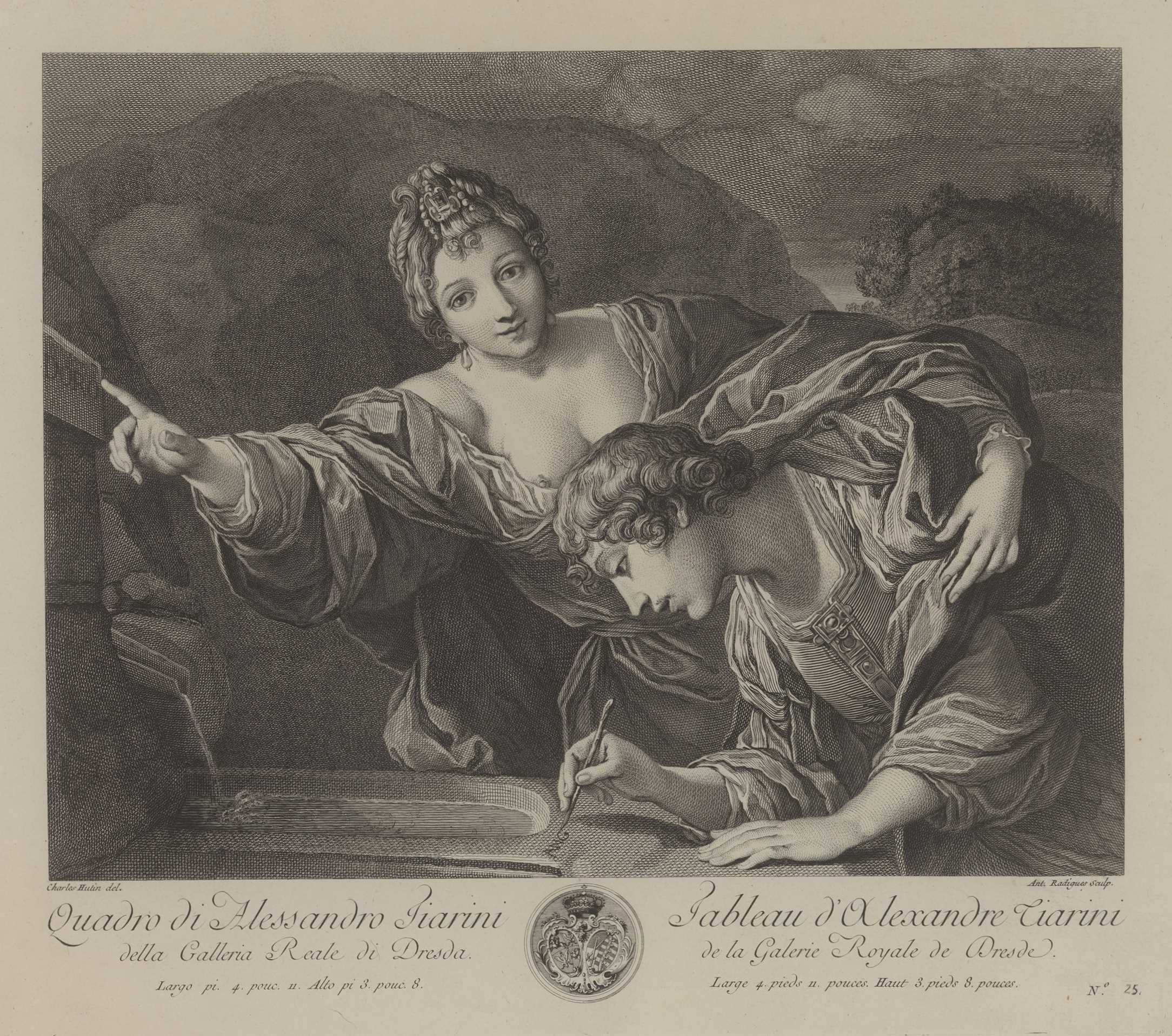
Angelica and Medoro, engraving by Antoine Radigues, after Alessandro Tiarini, c.1750

Stage adaptations of Angelica and Medoro's story have used both Boiardo’s and Ariosto ’s poems as inspiration; including works written in Italian, French, and English among other languages. The story is set mainly in Europe (primarily France) at the time of King Charlemagne. Central to the story is the real Frankish military leader Roland who was Charlemagne's nephew; known in these fictional accounts as the character Orlando.

=== Boiardo’s Orlando Innamorato ===
In Boiardo’s tale Angelica is the pagan daughter of the Great Khan of Cathay (generally interpreted to mean the daughter of the Emperor of China, but sometimes interpreted as the daughter of the leader of India). She arrives with her brother, the pagan warrior Argalia, in the court of Charlemagne where she quickly gains many admirers among the French knights, including cousins Orlando and Rinaldo (Renaud). A tournament between the paladins and pagans is organized with Angelica offering herself as the prize to the man who can defeat her brother. After Argalia is killed by the French knight Ferraù, Angelica flees with Orlando and Rinaldo in pursuit.

While trying to escape her pursuers in the Ardenne forest, Angelica drinks from the magical Stream of Love which makes her infatuated with Rinaldo. Rinaldo conversely comes upon the Fount of Hate in the forrest, and after drinking from it, develops a loathing for Angelica causing him to run from her. Angelica seeks help in capturing Rinaldo from the magician Malagigi, and he spells Rinaldo onto an enchanted island. Ultimately Angelica returns home to Cathay where she is pursued by another unwanted admirer, King Agrican, who keeps her captive in the fortress of Albracca. Orlando comes to the fortress, kills Agrican, and rescues her.

Meanwhile, the Saracen king Agramante has invaded France with a large army to avenge the murder of his father, Troiano, who was killed by Orlando. Rinaldo escapes from the enchanted island, finds Orlando, and tries to convince him to return home to France. Jealous over Angelica's love for Rinaldo, Orlando fights his cousin. Rinaldo leaves to return to France to aid Charlemagne. Still besotted from her drink from the River of Love, Angelica follows closely behind him with Orlando in hot pursuit. While traveling back through the Ardenne forest, Angelica drinks from the Fount of Hate and Rinaldo from the River of Love, reversing their situation.

When they all arrive at the French court, Rinaldo and Orlando get in a fight again over Angelica, and Charlemagne decides to get rid of her to restore the peace by placing her in the charge of Duke Namo of Bavaria. He further offers her as the prize for the Christian knight who fights the best in the war with Saracen king. The story ends abruptly after the Saracen paladin Ruggiero and Rinaldo's sister, Bradamante, fall in love.

=== Ariosto's Orlando Furioso ===
The following synopsis focuses on Angelica and Medoro's characters, and leaves out many plot details from the wider poem that do not involve them.

Ariosto picks up the story where Boiardo ended. Charlemagne and his army of Christian knights are besieged in Paris by the army of the Saracen king Agramante, now in alliance with King Marsilio of Spain and the brash warrior Rodomonte. Angelica escapes from the castle of the Bavarian Duke Namo, and she is pursued by both Orlando, who is madly in love with her, and Saracen knight Ferraù. Not wishing to be caught by either man, she manages to escape when they get into a brawl. Angelica is accosted by the lustful pagan Sacripante, but is rescued by the Christian female knight Bradamante who trounces him. The two women happily travel together.

Angelica is pursued by Rinaldo who is still under the spell of the Stream of Love, and she in turn loathes him under the enchantment of the Fount of Hate. Sacripante also follows her, and he and Rinaldo get into a fight when they both come upon Angelica at the same time, allowing her to escape. Angelica is lusted after by an Old Magician / Hermit, who uses his sprite to deceive Rinaldo and Sacripante into thinking that Angelica has been escorted back to Paris by Orlando. Upon returning to Charlemagne, Rinaldo is sent to Scotland to get reinforcements to fight back the invading pagan army. Meanwhile, Angelica is caught by magic on a deserted beach by the Old Hermit who gives her a sleeping potion in plans to rape her. His impotence prevents him from succeeding.

Vulnerable in her enchanted sleep, Angelica is kidnapped by the men of the northern island of Ebuda who plan to sacrifice her to an orca as part of the fulfillment of the appeasement of a curse. She is rescued by the pagan knight Ruggiero who uses a magic ring and shield in the deed. They escape on the back of a hippogriff to Brittany. When they land Ruggiero is overcome with lust for Angelica and accosts her. She escapes by slipping on the magic ring she takes from Ruggiero which causes her to vanish. Meanwhile, Orlando is searching for Angelica at the island of Eduba and rescues another girl, Olimpia, from being sacrificed. He continues his search and ends up trapped by sorceress Atlante in her castle with the knight Ruggiero as his fellow captor. They are rescued by Angelica with the aid of the magic ring, but she chooses to leave them after their freedom has been secured.

The Scottish and English forces brought to France by Rinaldo help turn the tide of the war leading Charlemagne to victory. The Saracen Prince Dardinello is killed, and two soldiers in his service, Medoro and Cloridano, sneak into the French encampment to retrieve his corpse in order to give it a proper burial. Cloridano runs off when Medoro is caught by Scottish troops led by Zerbino. Medoro pleads to be allowed to bury Dardinello, but is rebuffed and left for dead after being seriously wounded in the chest. Cloridano attempts to rescue Medoro and is killed. Angela comes across Medoro, and takes pity on him. She carries him to a shepherd's cottage where she nurses him back to health. In the poem Ariosto describes how Cupid, annoyed with Angelica's disdain for love, waits beside Medoro for Angelica with an arrow fitted in his bow.

Angelica falls in love with Medoro as she cares for him. When he is fully recovered they marry and mark the event by carving their names into a tree. They honeymoon for one month in the shepherd's cottage before departing for Spain. As a parting gift to the Shepherd and his wife who have been their hosts, Angelica gives them the bracelet she was gifted by Orlando as a token of his love. Orlando arrives at the Shepherd's cottage and is incensed upon discovering their names carved into a tree and finding the bracelet he gave Angelica in the possession of the shepherd. He becomes enraged, wrecking havoc and destruction upon the land and its inhabitants. Orlando tracks Angelica and Medoro down in Spain, kill's Medoro's horse and pursues Angelica who uses her magic ring to escape. Orlando continues his path of destructive wrath as he travels the strait of Gibraltar to Africa.

Tales of Orlando's madness travel and it is concluded that it is God's punishment for loving a pagan woman. St John the Evangelist and Prince Astolfo of England fly to the moon to obtain a phial hidden there that will restore Orlando's sanity. When Orlando arrives at Astolfo's camp he is restrained by the Christians and forcibly made to drink the phial. The phial works and he gives up his pursuit of Angelica to return to defending Christian Europe from pagan invaders. The fate of Angelica and Medoro is unclear, although the poem states they sail for Carthay (meaning either India or China) where Medoro will become king.

=== Scenes often depicted by artists ===
Cupid's waiting by Medoro with an arrow intended for Angelica is a common theme in arti. The Villa Valmarana Tiepolo cycle (1757) shows two scenes between Angelica and Medoro. The most popular scene in art is of the lovers carving their names into a tree in a sylvan setting; most often Angelica is shown doing the carving. It is when the hero Orlando, who is in love with Angelica, finds the names that he becomes furioso or mad.

== Incomplete list of artists depicting Angelica and Medoro ==
- Andrea Casali Angelica and Medoro, c. 1750
- Nicolas-Sébastien Adam, Angélique et Médor, 1753
- François Boucher, Angelica and Medoro, 1763
- Ludovico Carracci, Angelica and Medoro, two heads
- Eugène Delacroix, Angelica and the wounded Medoro, c. 1860
- Angelica Kauffman, The Loves of Angelica and Medoro
- Laurent de La Hyre, Angelica and Medoro, 1641
- Teodoro Matteini, after a design by Raphael Sanzio Morghen
- Marcantonio Raimondi, Angelica e Medoro, after Giulio Romano
- Joshua Reynolds, Angelica and Medoro
- Bonifazio Veronese, Angelica e Medoro
- Benjamin West, Angelica and Medoro, 1763–1764
- John Wootton, Landscape with Angela and Medoro, in the Royal Albert Memorial Museum in Exeter
- Michael Stroy, Angelika und Medor (1833), a scene from the epic Orlando Furioso

=== Gallery ===
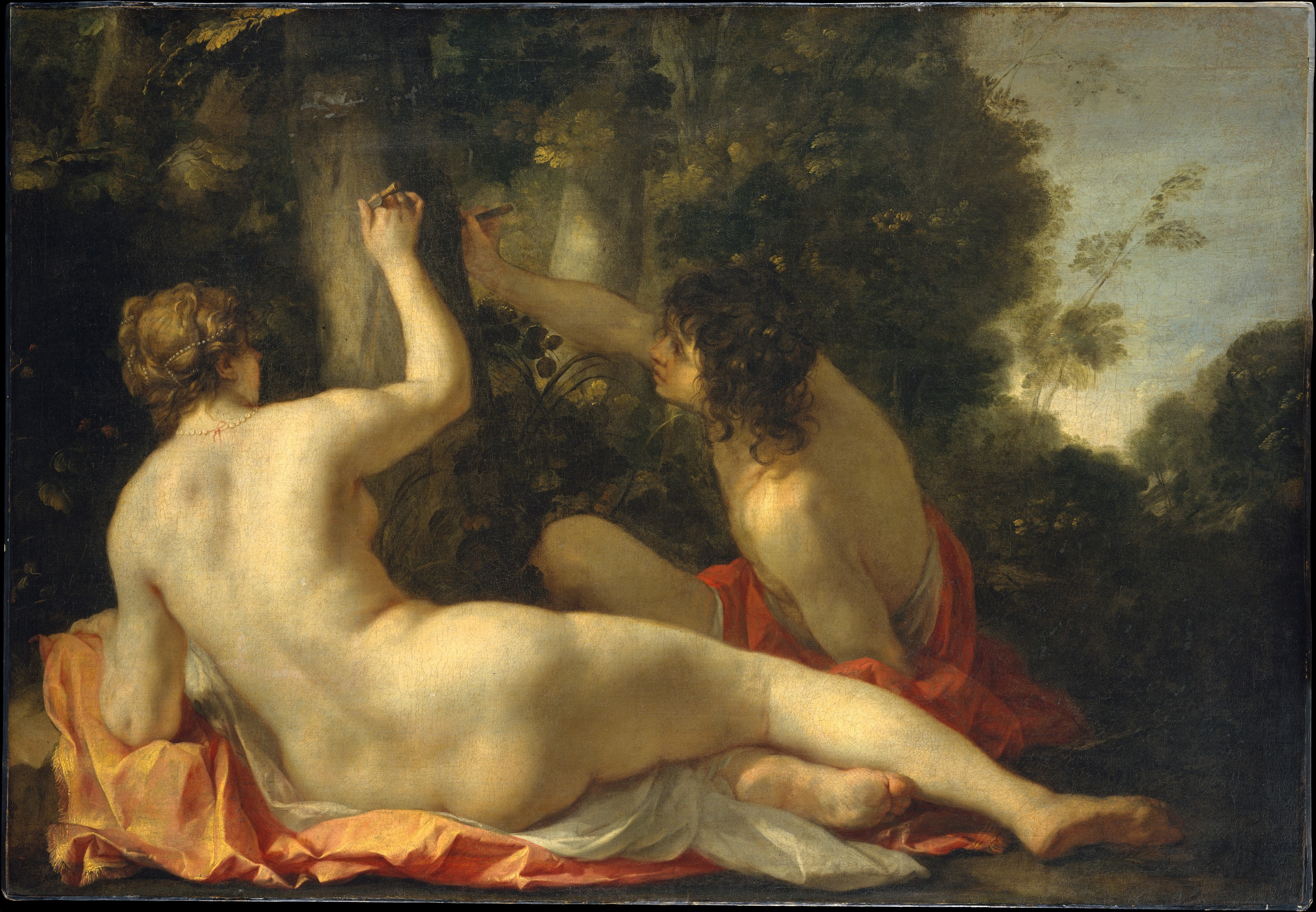
Jacques Blanchard, Angelica and Medoro, 1630

Sebastiano Ricci, Medoro and Angelica, c. 1720

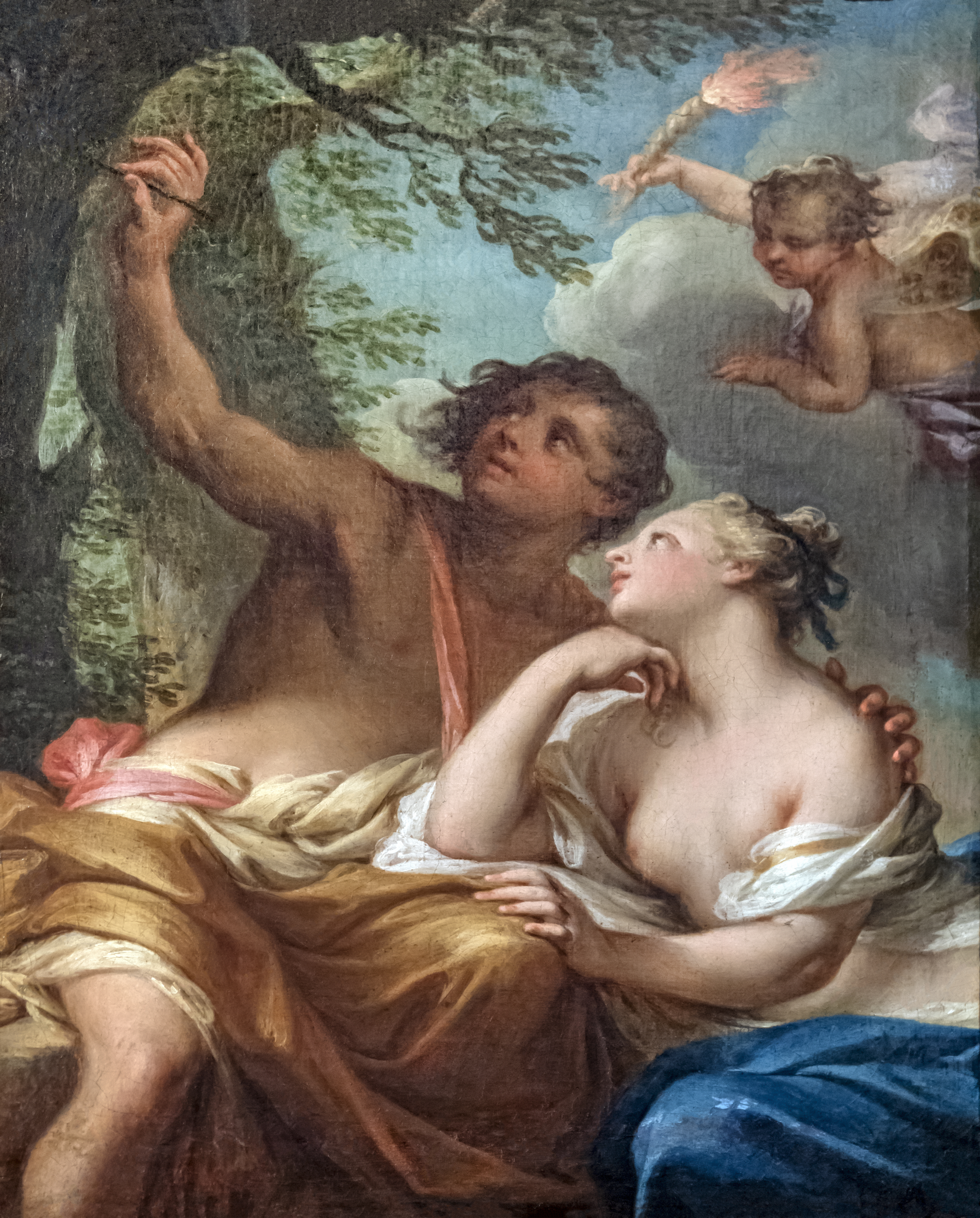
Andrea Casali, c. 1750 Angelica and Medoro

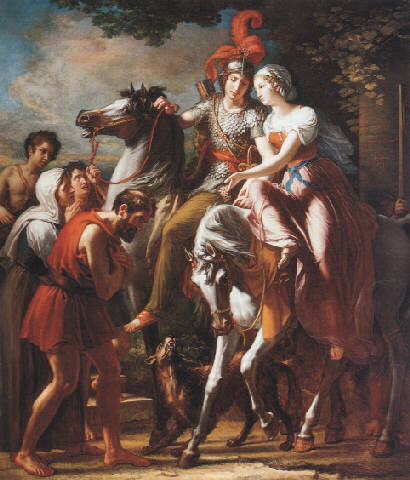
René Théodore Berthon, Departure of Angelica and Medoro, c. 1810

==== Angelica nurses the wounded Medoro ====
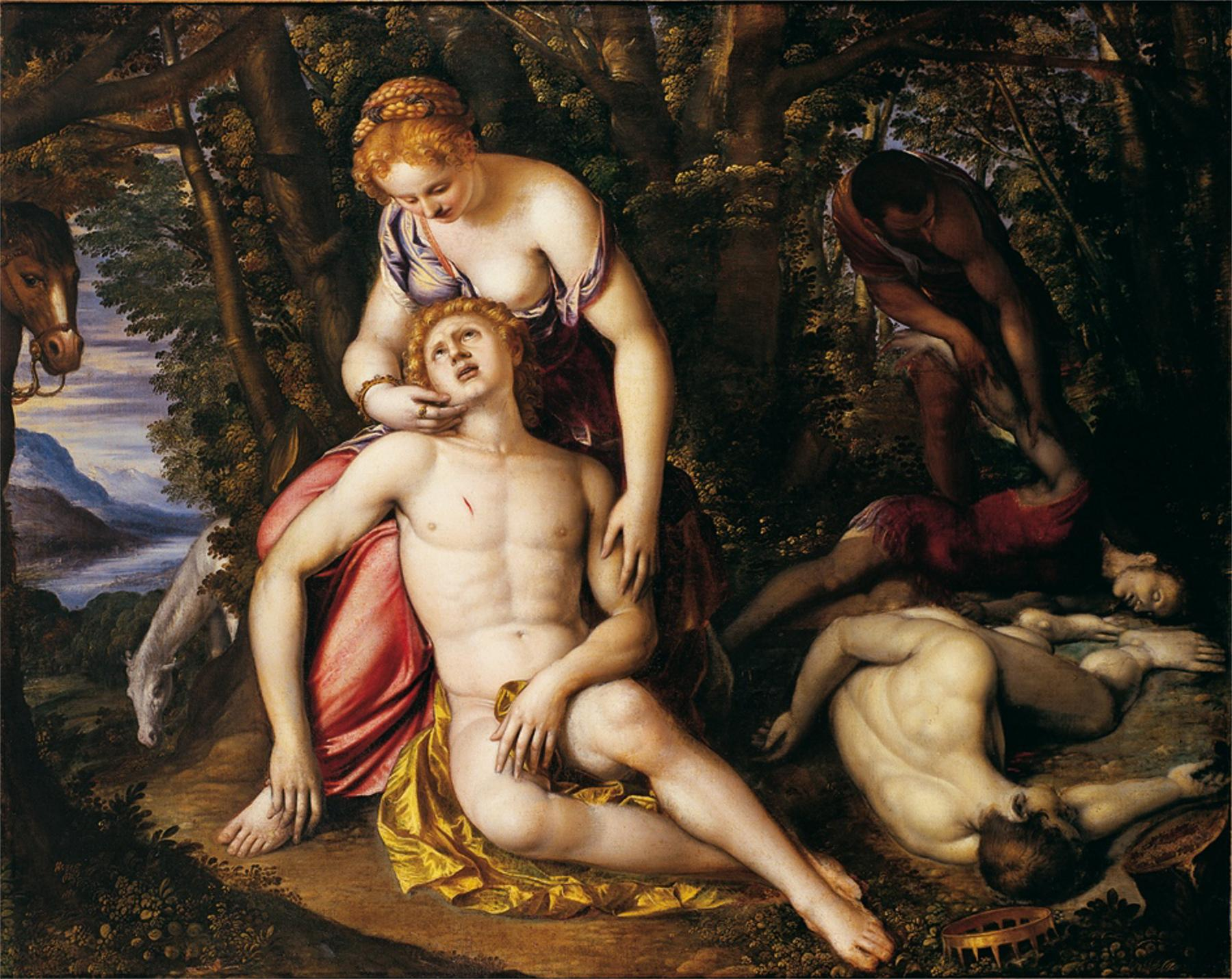
Simone Peterzano, Angelica and Medoro, before 1596

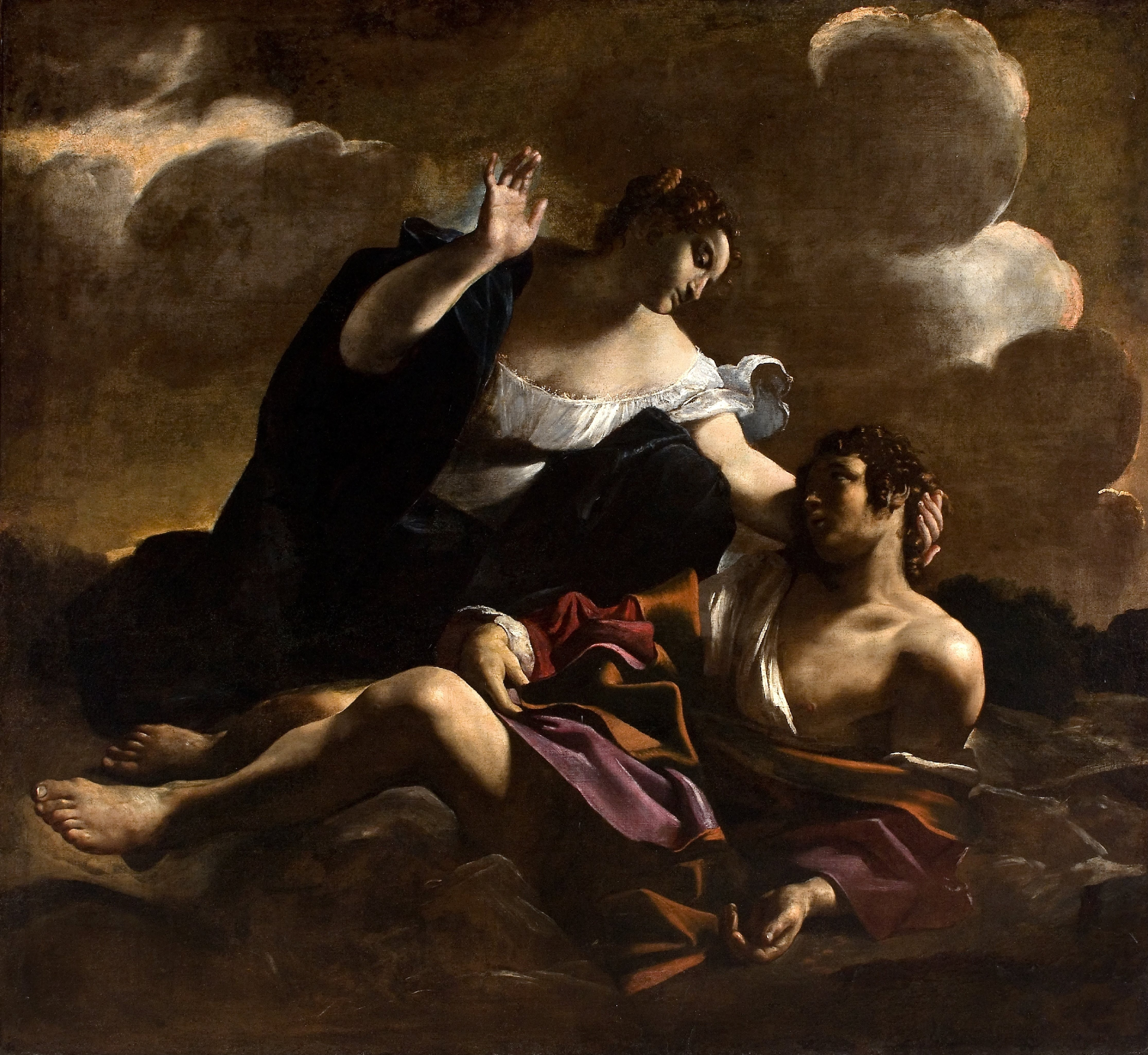
Lanfranco, Angelica and Medoro, 1633–1634

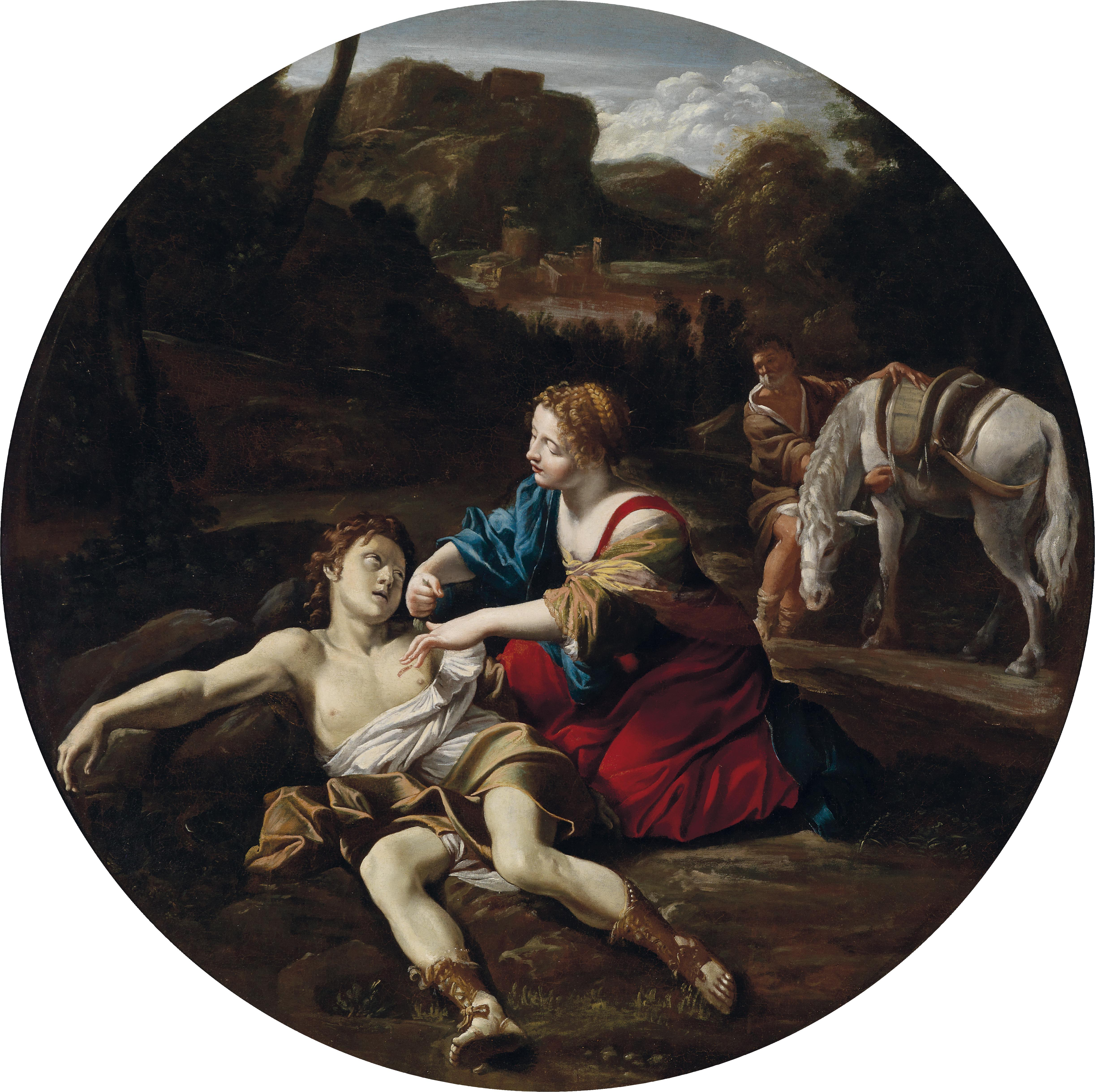
Giovanni Lanfranco, Angelica nurses Medoro, before 1647

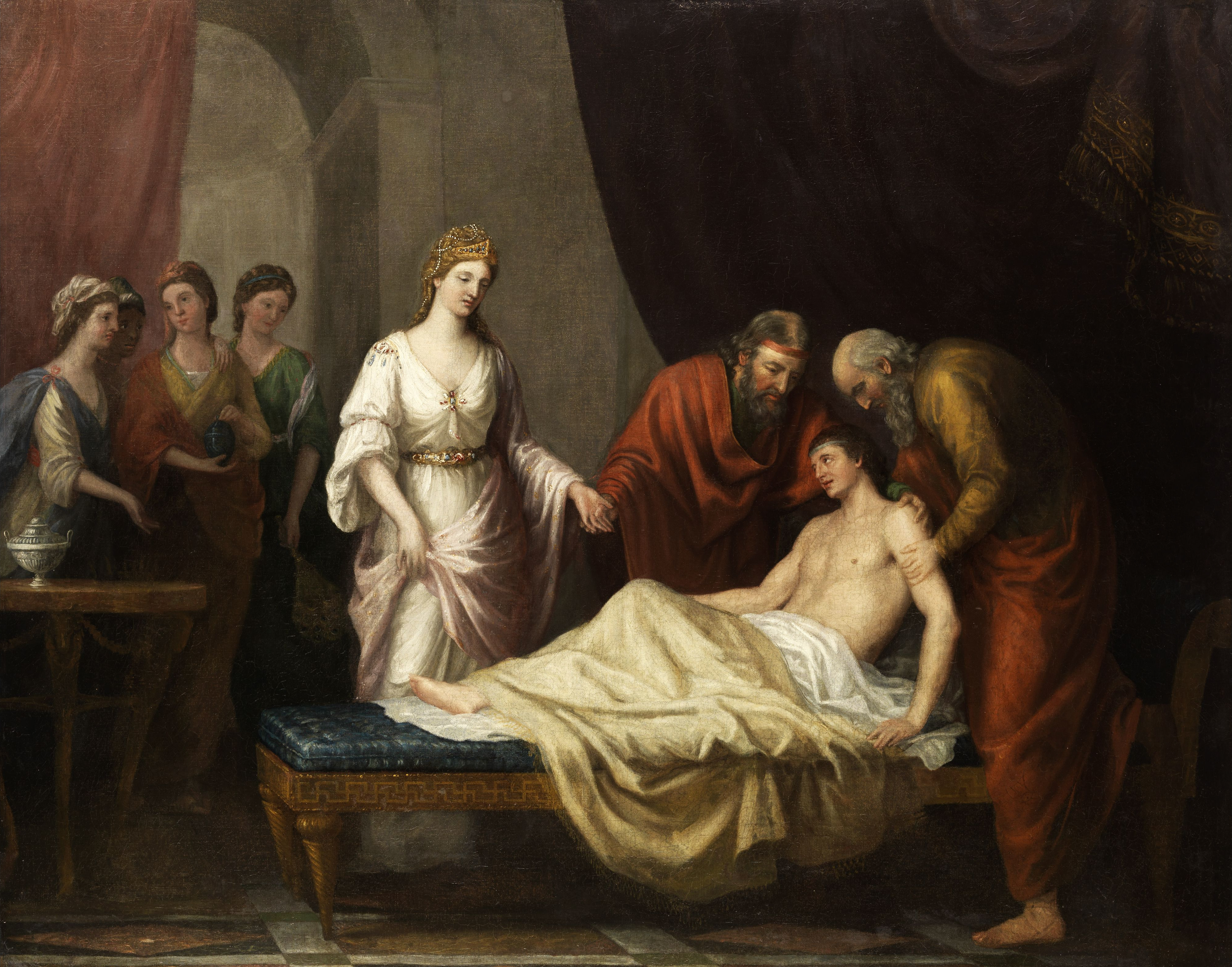
Angelica and Medoro, 18th century (artist unknown)

== List of authors writing about Angelica and Medoro ==
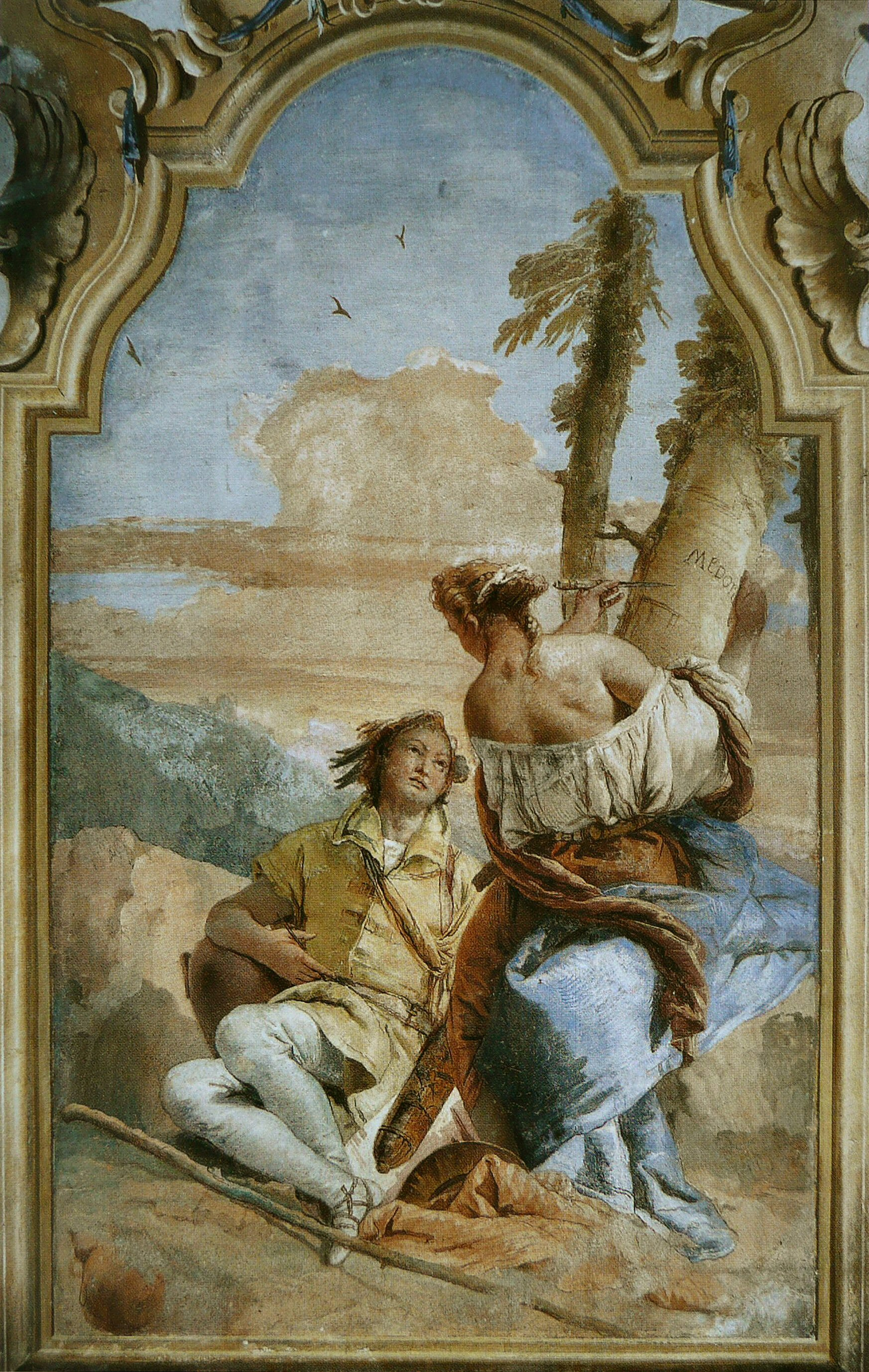
Giovanni Battista Tiepolo, Angelica Carving Medoro's Name on a Tree, 1757.

- Francisco de Aldana (1537–1578), Medoror y Angélica, describing their adventures after the end of the Orlando Furioso
- Luis Barahona de Soto, Primera parte de la Angélica (1586), also describing the adventures after the ending of the Furioso
- Lope de Vega, La hermosura de Angélica (1602)
- Luis de Góngora, En un pastoral albergue, 1602, depicting the honeymoon of Angelica and Medoro
- José de Cañizares, Angélica y Medoro, 1722

== Partial list of opera libretti about Angelica and Medoro ==
=== Lo sposalizio di Medoro e Angelica (1619) by Andrea Salvadori ===
The earliest known libretto of the Angelica and Medoro story, Lo sposalizio di Medoro e Angelica, was written by Andrea Salvadori. It was set to music by composers Jacopo Peri and Marco da Gagliano; an opera which premiered in 1619. The libretto for this opera chose to focus on Sacripante as the scorned lover figure in the love triangle with Angelica and Medoro rather than utilize the Orlando character.

=== Roland (1685) by Philippe Quinault ===
The libretto Roland by Philippe Quinault was set to music by Jean-Baptiste Lully in 1685. It is a closer rendering of the original tale of Orlando, Angelica and Medoro but still has its own unique divergences including the intervention of ghostly fallen hero characters named La Gloire [Glory], La Renommée [Fame] and La Terreur [Terror]. This libretto emphasizes the unworthiness of Orlando's love for a pagan woman.

=== L'Orlando, overo La gelosa pazzia (1711) by Carlo Sigismondo Capece ===
The libretto L'Orlando, overo La gelosa pazzia by Carlo Sigismondo Capece was set to music by Domenico Scarlatti and premiered in Rome in 1711. Scarlatti's opera is now lost, but better known and still surviving is Orlando by George Frideric Handel. This second opera used a libretto adapted by an unknown writer from Capece's libretto. Handel's opera premiered at the King's Theatre in London in 1733. This opera uses the tale of Angelica, Medoro, and Orlando as its central plot, but incorporates the historical figure of Zoroaster (in the opera Zoroastro) who is portrayed as a magician. The shepherd of Ariosto's story is replaced by the shepherdess Dorinda who complicates the story by falling in love with Medoro.

The character of Orlando also features in Handel's operas Alcina and Ariodante, but these operas do not contain Angelica and Medoro in their plots.

=== Anglelica e Medoro (1720) by Metastasio ===
Metastasio's libretto Anglelica e Medoro, described as a serenata, was first set in 1720 by Nicola Antonio Porpora. Unlike Salvadori's libretto it chose a more straightforward adaptation based around the love triangle of Orlando, Angelica, and Medoro. However, it introduced a secondary love match between two new characters, Tirsi and Licori. The original 1720 production of Porpora's opera marked the debut of Farinelli. The libretto was later set by Giovanni Battista Mele in 1747.

=== Orlando furioso (1727) by Grazio Braccioli ===
Grazio Braccioli's libretto Orlando furioso was set to music by Antonio Vivaldi in 1727. It takes many liberties with the story of the original epic poem, pulling in other characters such as the wicked sorceress Alcina and the knight Ruggiero and having them interact with the characters Angelica and Medoro in ways not found in the original source material. In this tale Alcina, Ruggiero, and the lady knight Bradamante form a secondary love triangle. Alcina rescues a dying Medoro from a shipwreck, and becomes Angelica's co-conspirator in trapping Orlando inside a mountain. Orlando destroys the mountain along with Alcina's power prior to coming to a place of forgiveness and acceptance of Angelica and Medoro's union; ultimately giving his blessing.

=== Orlando paladino (1782) by Nunziato Porta ===
Nunziato Porta based his libretto Orlando paladino on another lesser known libretto, Le pazzie d'Orlando, by Carlo Francesco Badini. Baldini's libretto was set to music by Pietro Alessandro Guglielmi in 1771. Orlando paladino was set to music by Joseph Haydn in 1782. As with other adaptations, Orlando's wrathful search for the lovers Angelica and Medoro is a primary plot point. In this version of the story Alcina is more of a good witch rather than a bad one. She only temporarily turns Orlando into a rock as a punishment for his behavior.

=== Angelica e Medoro by Leopoldo de Villati ===
- Carl Heinrich Graun, Angelica e Medoro (3 acts, 1749)

=== Angelica e Medoro by Carlo Vedova ===
- Giovanni Battista Lampugnani, Angelica e Medoro, 1738
- Giovanni Battista Pescetti, Angelica e Medoro, 1739

=== Angelica e Medoro by Gaetano Sertor ===
- Gaetano Andreozzi, Angelica e Medoro, 1791

=== Other ===
Lorenzo Da Ponte's libretto for Wolfgang Amadeus Mozart's Così fan tutte has no explicit literary source, and is considered Da Ponte's most original libretto. The aria "Rivolgete a lui lo sguardo", written for the character Guglielmo, contains reference to the Orlando, Medoro, and Angelica love triangle in which Guglielmo describes how his passion for Fiordiligi surpasses that of Orlando and Medoro's for Angelica. This aria was cut by Mozart from the opera, but has remained a popular concert aria.

- Vito Giuseppe Milicco and Domenico Cimarosa, Angelica e Medoro, 1783, a cantate
