= Giulio Parigi =

Italian painter, engraver and architect

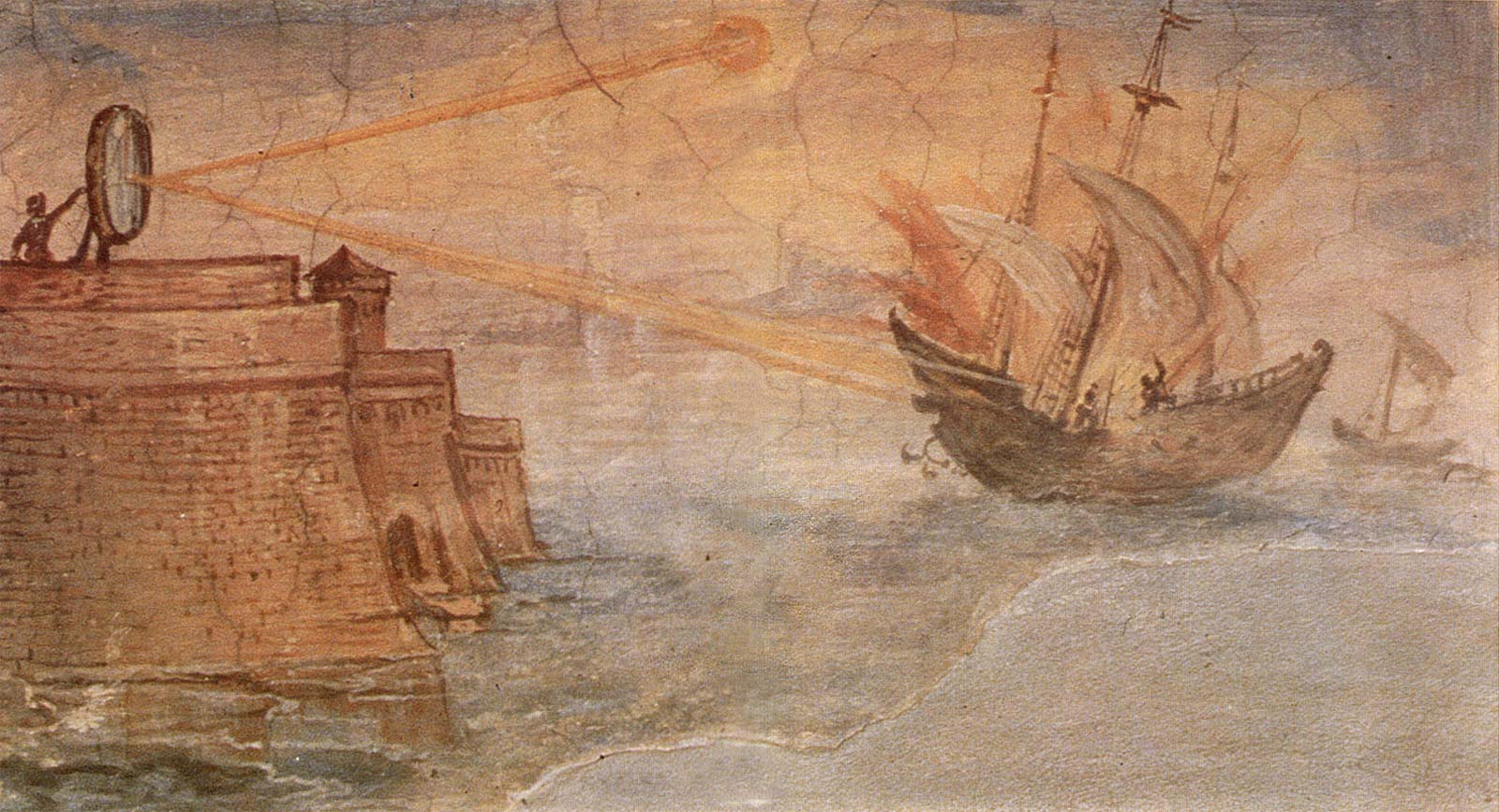
- Painting by Giulio Parigi in Florence, Italy, showing Archimedes' mirror used to burn Roman ships
- Born: 1571; Florence, Italy
- Died: 1635 (aged 63–64)
- Education: Academy of Design, Florence (1594); Grand Ducal Court (1597)
- Known for: architect, stage designer, civil engineer, landscape architect, painter

Giulio Parigi (6 April 1571 – 13 July 1635) was an Italian architect and designer.

He was the main member of a family of architects and designers working for the Grand Ducal court of the Medici. His father, Alfonso Parigi the Elder, was an architect and designer working in Florence for the Grand Duke of Tuscany. He became noted as one of the most innovative stage designers of the 17th-century and was also the first architect to use the loggia style in public buildings.

== Early life and education ==
Giulio Parigi was born in Florence on 6 April 1571, the son of Alfonso di Santi Parigi and his wife, Alessandra di Berto Fiammeri. His father was an architect and set designer who was in service to the Grand Duke of Tuscany. Giulio grew up in Medici Florence, amongst the craftsmen who worked for his father. In 1594 he was enrolled at the Academy of Design as a painter and in 1597 he was enrolled at the Grand Ducal Court He was apprenticed to his father, Alfonso, Bartolomeo di Antonio Ammannati (1511–1592) and also to the theatre engineer, Bernardo Buontalenti (1535–1608).

== Career ==
Through his father's collaborations under the court architect Bernardo Buontalenti, Giulio Parigi was trained in the practice of architecture. Following Buontalenti's death (1608) he designed and oversaw the creation of the elaborate ephemeral decorations for court festivities, in which he was an influence on Inigo Jones, who was providing similar services in the same years for the court of James I of England. He also was an important early scenic designer for operas at the birth of that artform. He staged operas at the Medici court and in Florence's opera houses; creating innovative new machinery for sets for work's like Ottavio Rinuccini’s Festa dell’Agnolo Gabriello (1620) and Marco da Gagliano’s La regina Sant’Orsola (1624). His son, Alfonso Parigi, was also an innovative scenic designer for operas.

In 1610 Parigi built the Convent of the Peace of the Friars of St. Bernard, outside of the Roman Gate (now destroyed).

From 1613 onwards Giulio worked intensively as a civil engineer commissioned by the Grand Duke. Giulio worked on the Boboli Gardens, constructing the Grotto of Vulcan (Grotticina di Vulcano, 1617) and laying out the second axis of the Boboli Gardens, at right angles to the first, with the bosquets on either side.

Giulio constructed the Loggia del Grano in 1619, a Tuscan style loggia, and was thus amongst the first architects to employ the loggia in public buildings such as markets. The loggias established a pattern of market trading using mobile stalls under covered arcades which filtered out of the Italian peninsula and across Europe during the 16th and 17th centuries. Earlier exponents of this style included Giovanni Battista del Tasso with the Mercato Nuovo in 1547 and Giorgio Vasari with the Mercato Vecchio in Florence in 1567.

Giulio rebuilt the Villa di Poggio Imperiale (1620–1622), and constructed the Ospedale dei Medicanti (1621), the church of San Felice in Piazza (1634–1635) and worked on projects for the Palazzo della Crocetta for Maria Maddalena de' Medici. His is also the grand stairs of Palazzo Gianni-Lucchesini-Vegni (1624).

In the 16th and 17th century, theatre was for the very wealthy. Parigi constructed many sets for the Medici Court. Although none of these sets have survived, descriptions of them have been passed down. Parigi's set designs were notable for the instructions of machines that could emulate natural phenomena. These designs earned him a reputation as one of the most innovative stage designers of the 17th century.

Parigi's worked straddled many various media and disciplines. He was an artist who worked in oil, drawing and frescoes; he was an engraver, cabinet-maker, jeweller, landscape designer, architect and engineer. His work as a set designer required skills in engineering and mechanics in which he was noted for his innovations. He was also the Master of an academy where he studied Euclid, taught mechanics, perspective, civilian and military architecture.

== Later life and family ==
Giulio's son, Alfonso's grandson, Alfonso Parigi the Younger was also an architect and engraver. Alfonso worked with his father and under his supervision, completed some of the major projects. Parigi died in Florence on 13 July 1635.

== Influence ==
According to the Dictionary of Biography, "The centrality of the role played by Giulio Parigi in the artistic culture of his time emerges with great clarity in the Privilege that on February 14, 1623 it was granted to him by Grand Duke Ferdinand II ... recalling how during the grandfathers of Ferdinand I and of Cosimo II there was no "factory or work famous" that had not been invented, manned and "perfected" by Parigi."

== Gallery ==
Parigi's Work: Architecture

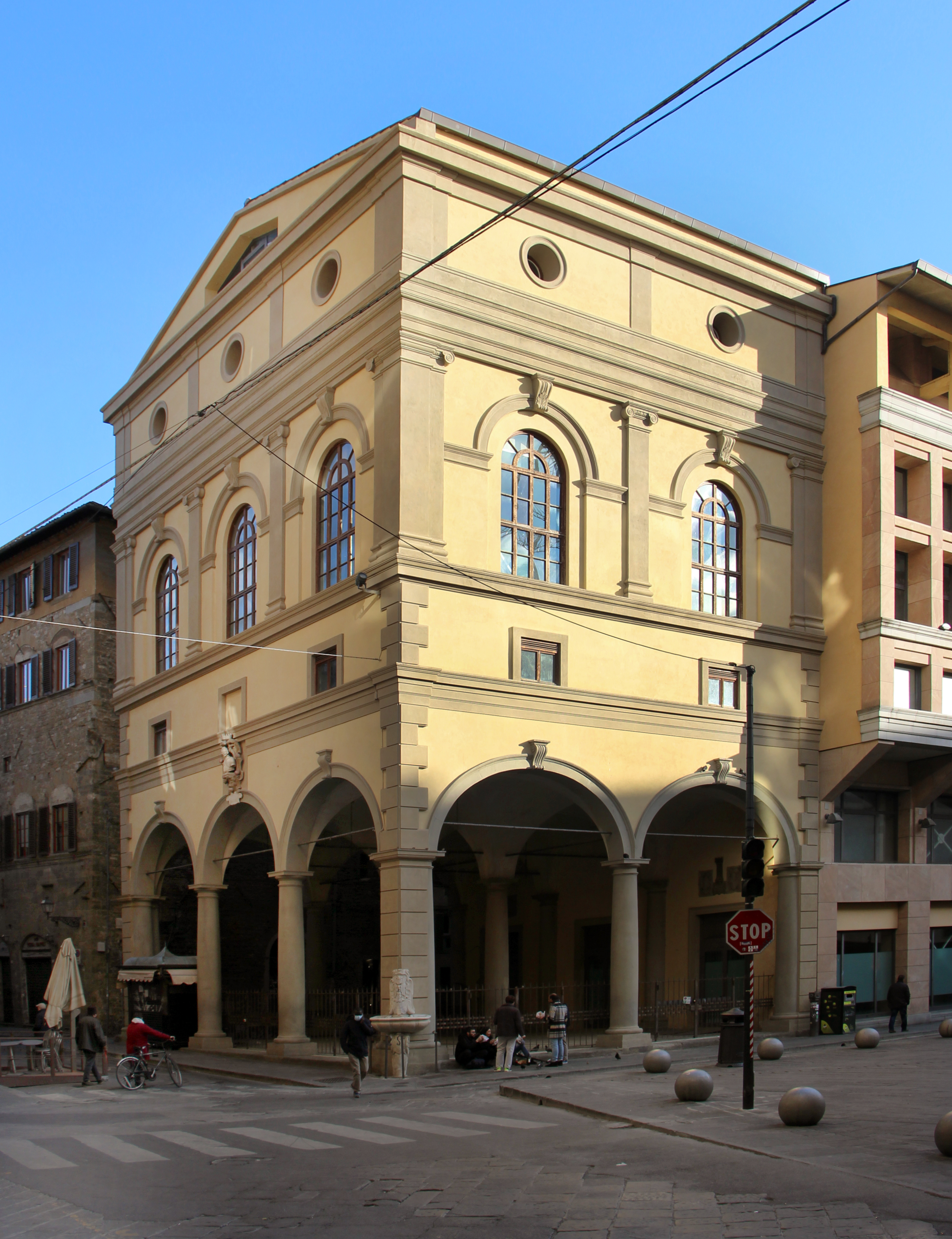
Loggia del grano, Florence, Italy, 1619

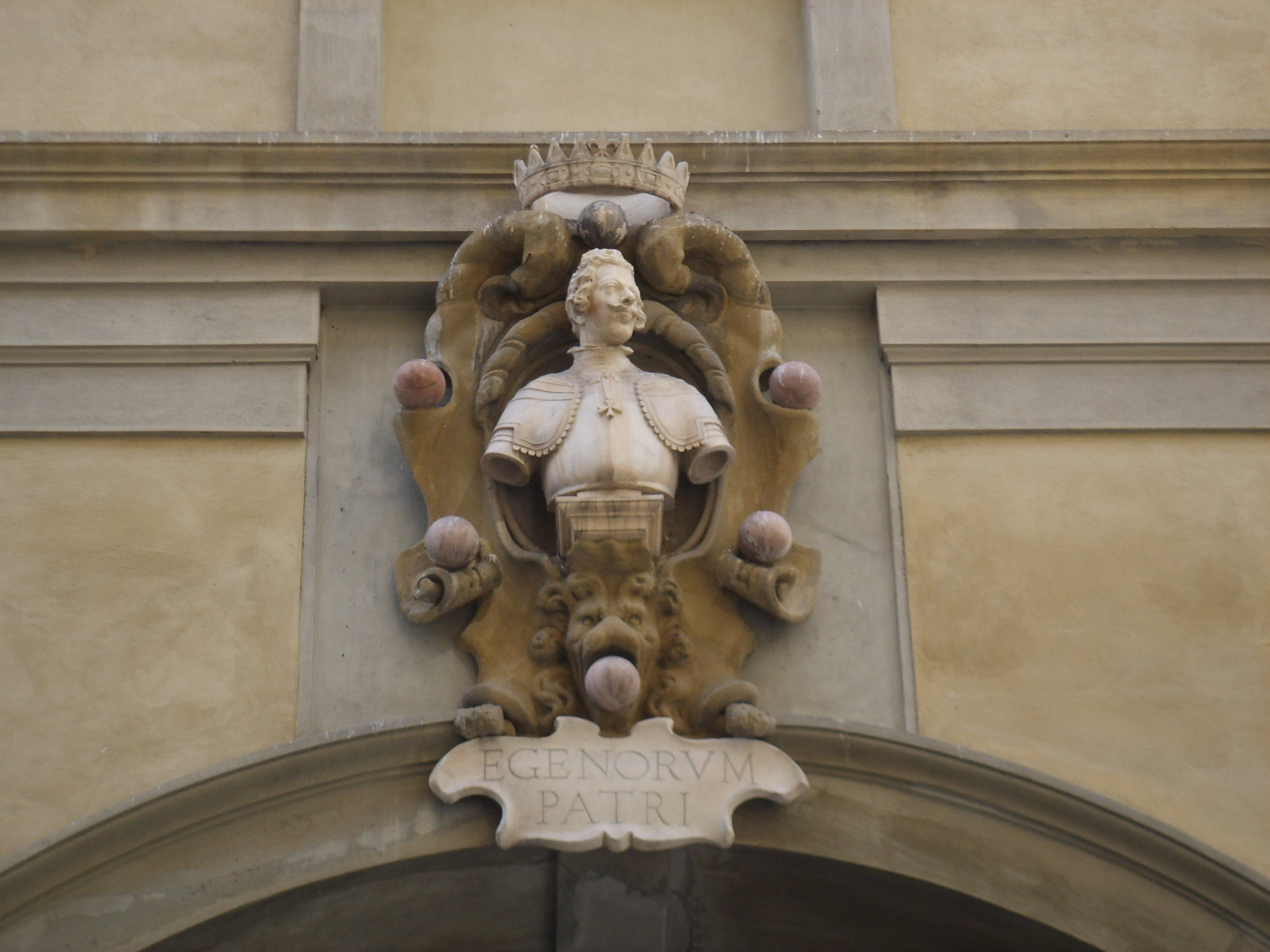
Loggia del Grano, Florence (detail of facade)

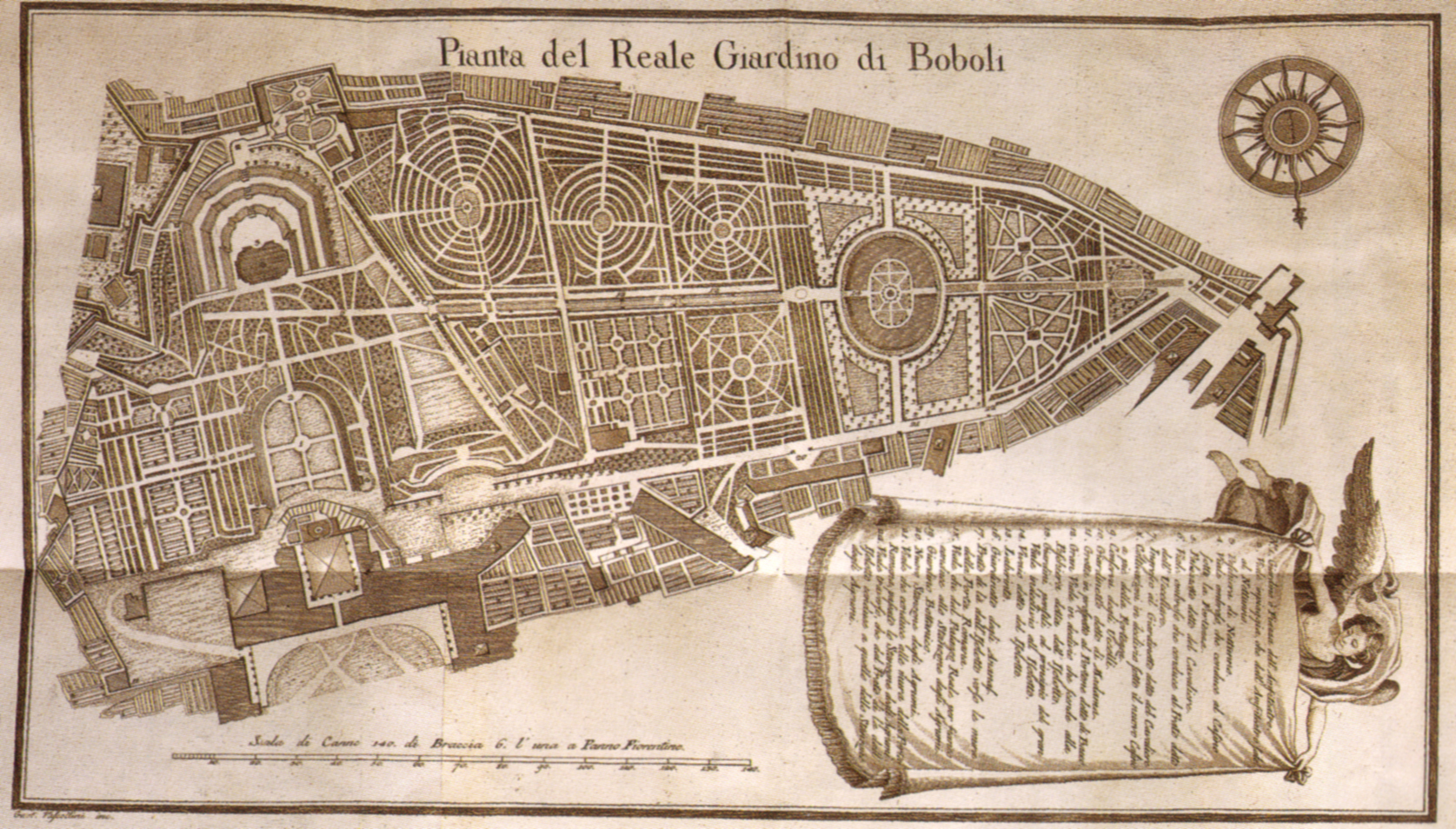
Plan of Boboli Gardens, 1617

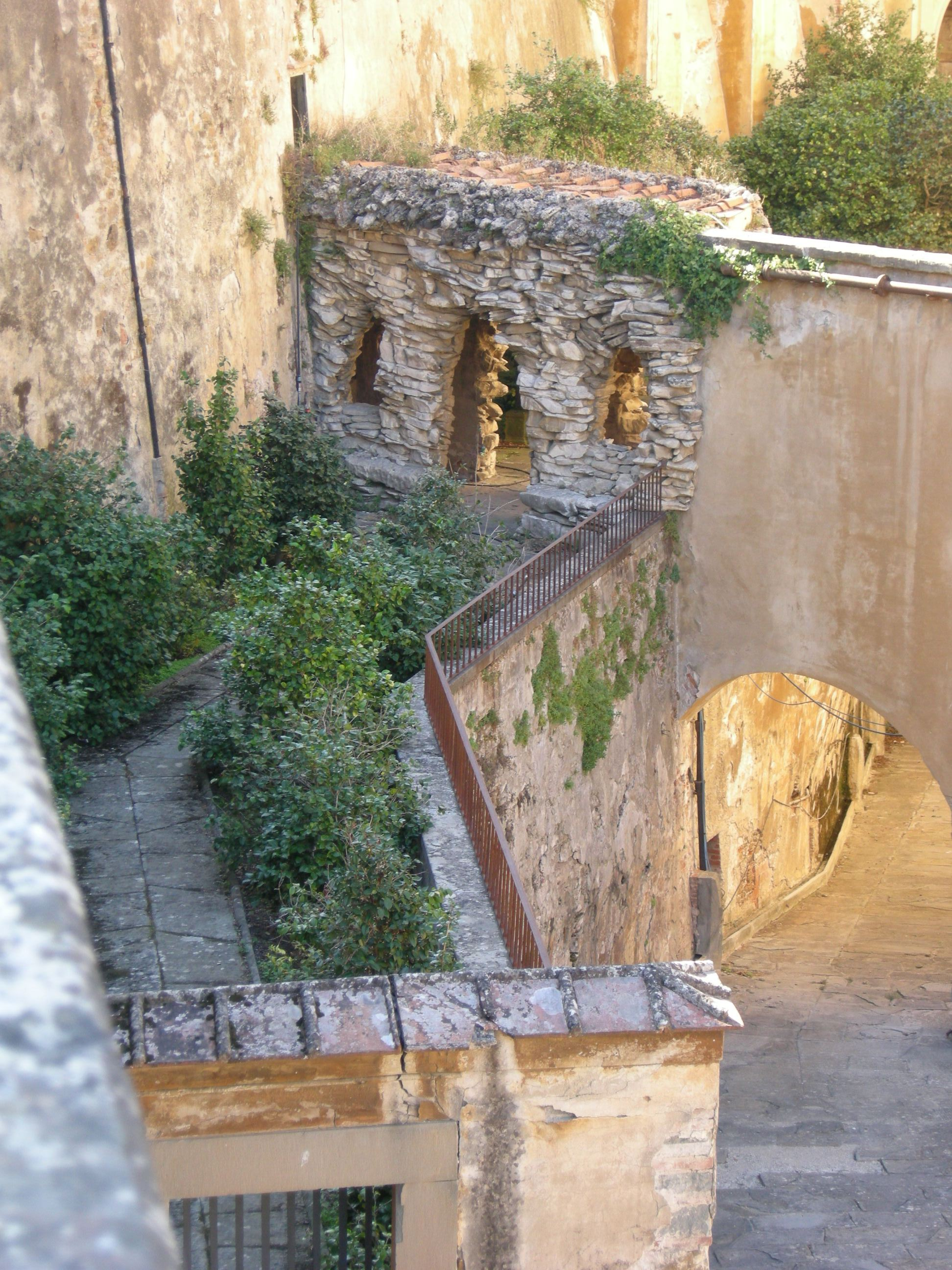
Grotticina, Boboli Gardens

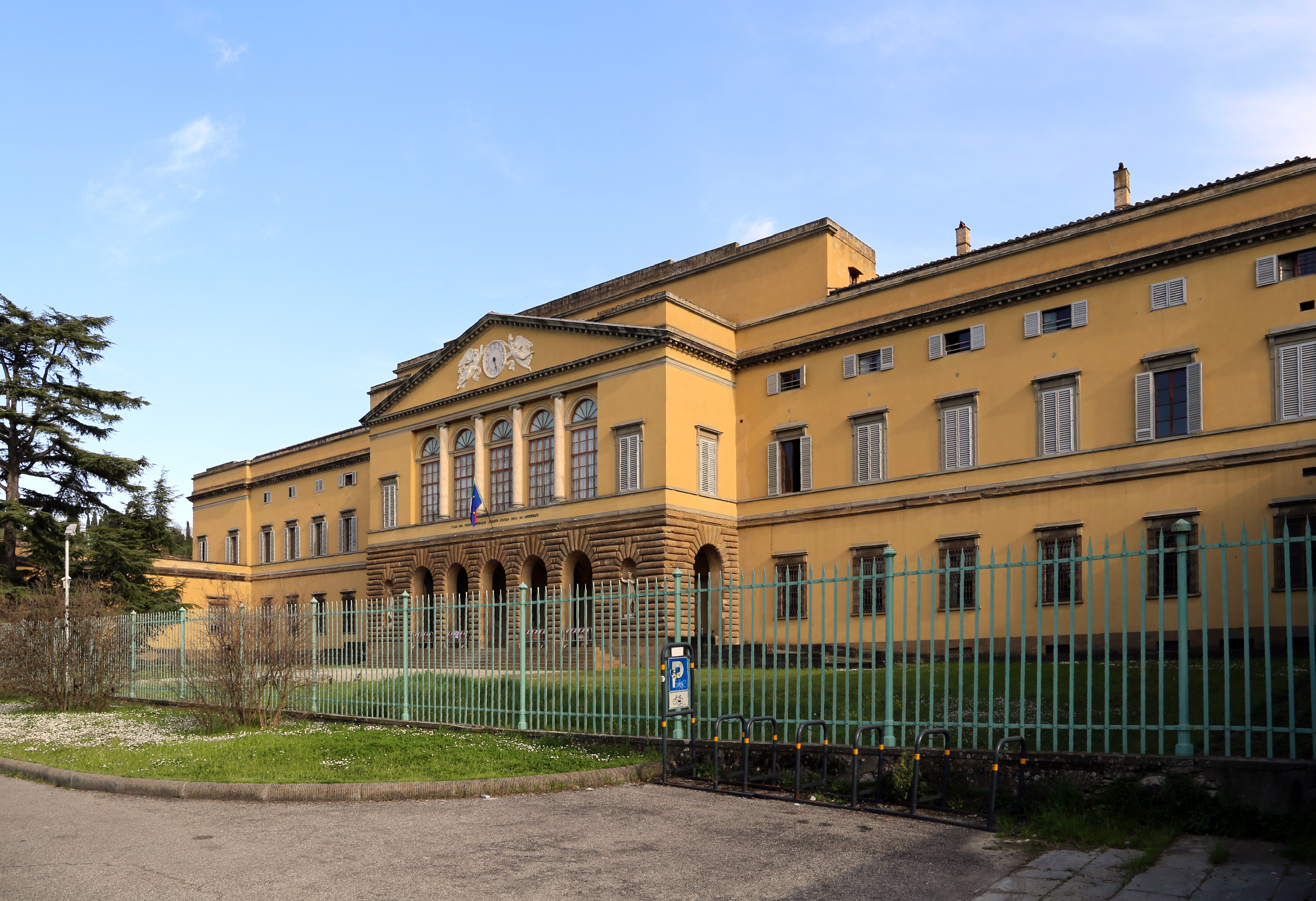
Villa di Poggio Imperiale, 1620–22

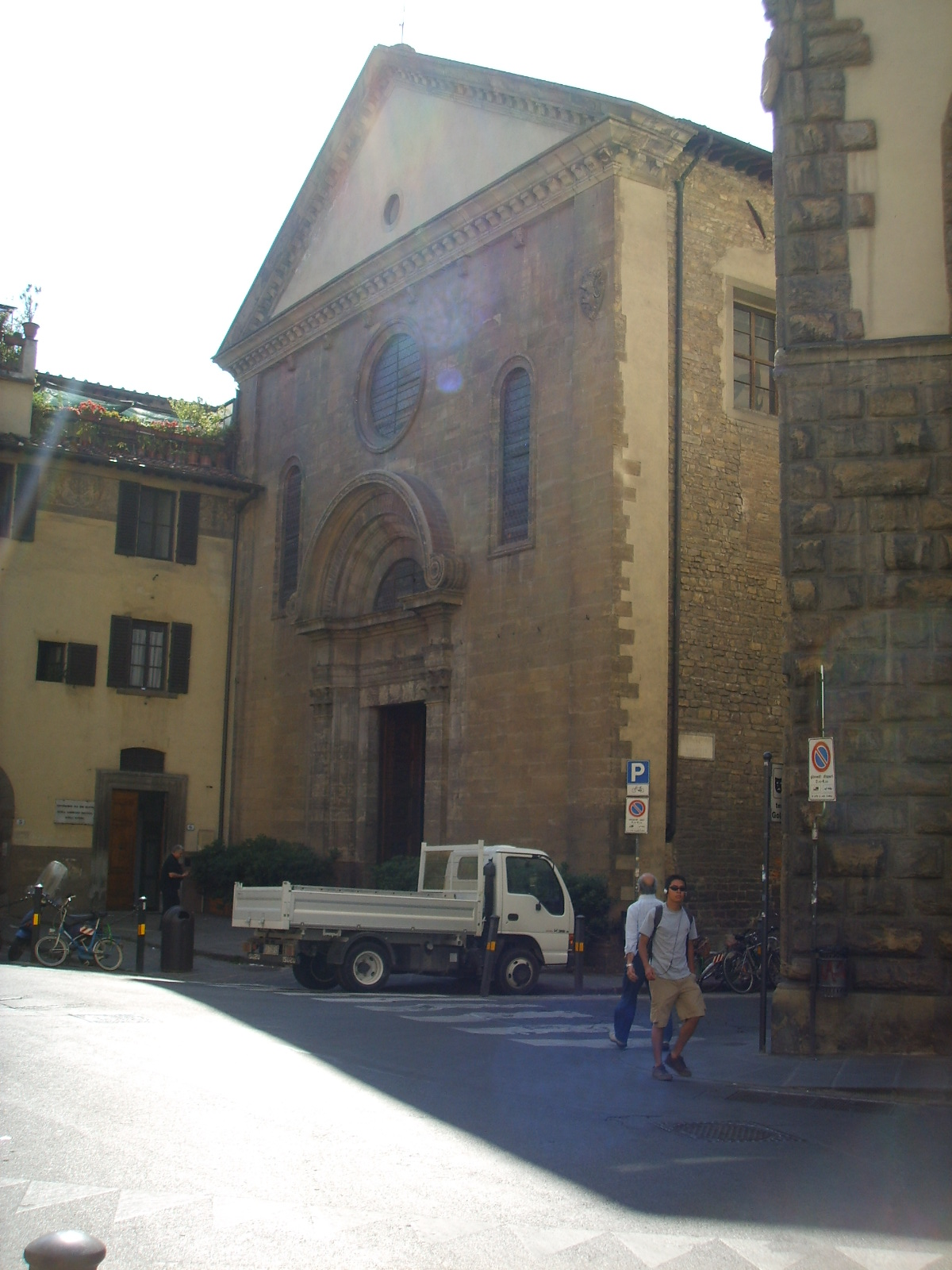
San Felice, Piazza, 1634–1635

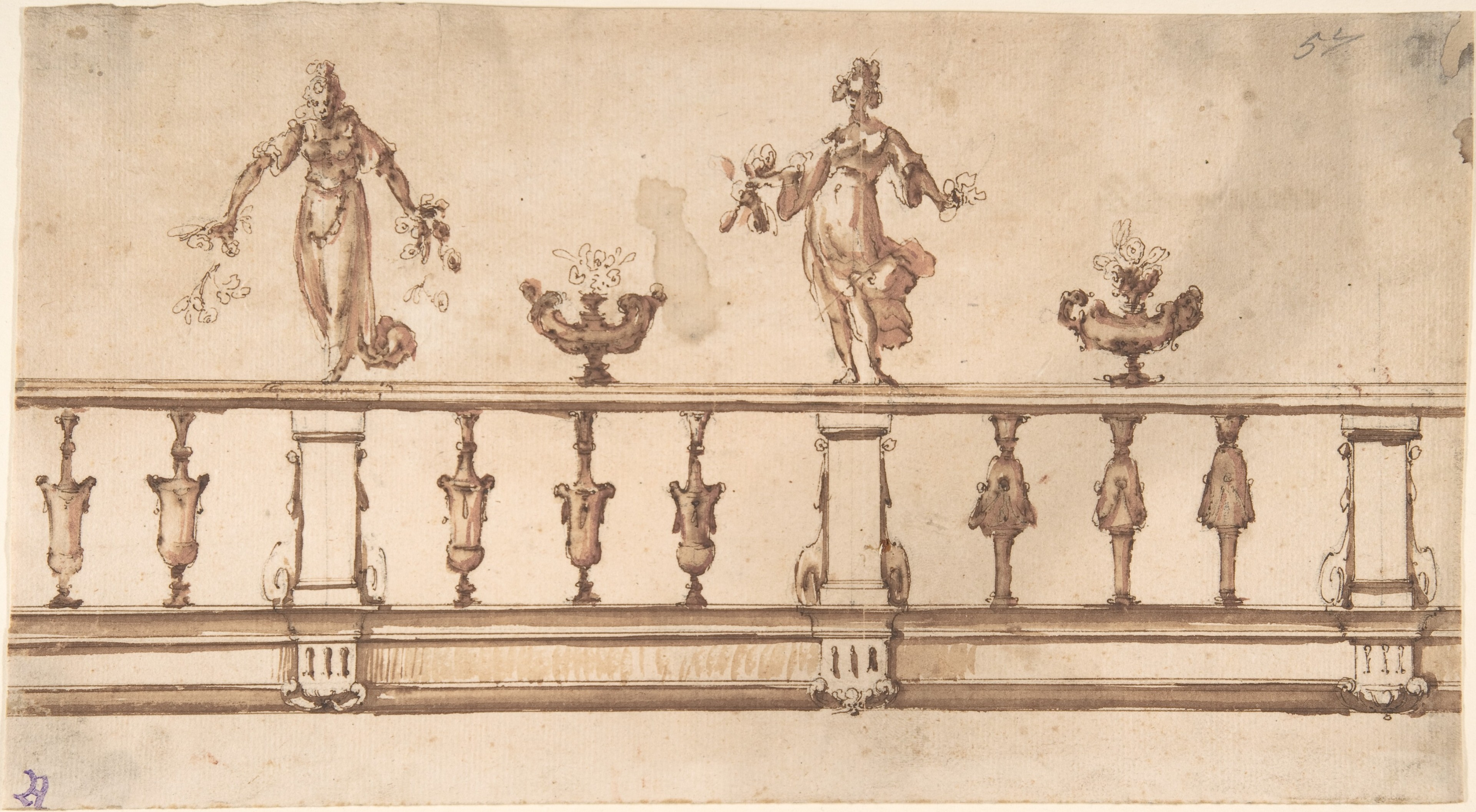
Design for a Balustrade with Female Figures and Urns

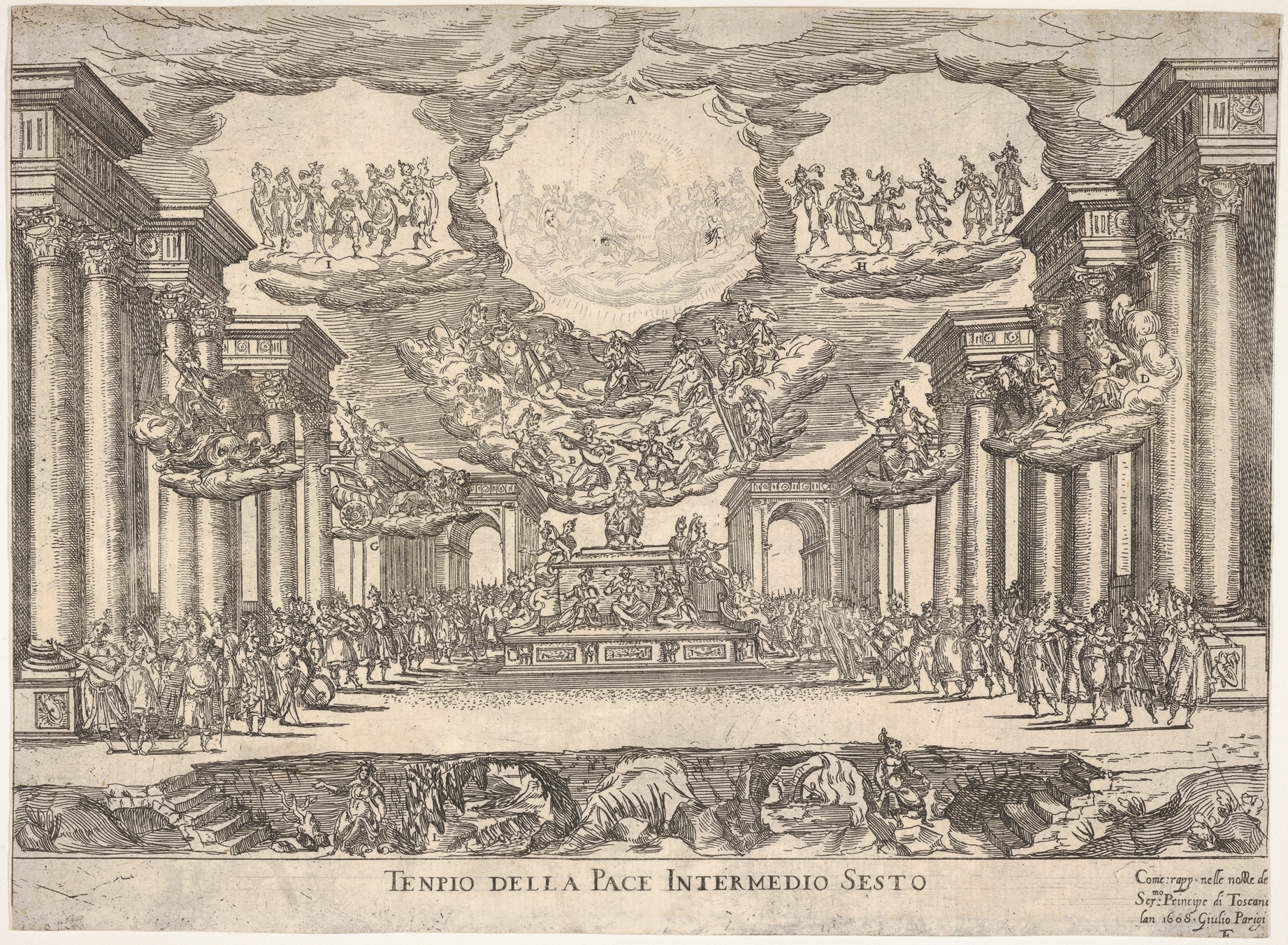
Sixth interlude- temple of peace (Intermedio sesto- tempio della pace), set design from the series 'Seven Interludes' for the wedding celebration of Cosimo de' Medici in Florence, 1608
