= Andrea Salvadori =

Italian writer (1591–1634)

Andrea Salvadori (1591 – buried 25 August 1634) was an Italian poet and librettist. He was born in Florence and educated at the Collegio Romano in Rome. From 1616 until his death in Florence at the age of 43, he was the principal court poet to the Medici family. In addition to numerous theatrical entertainments and poems, he wrote the libretti for five operas, four of which have survived, although only La Flora composed by Marco da Gagliano and Jacopo Peri has an extant score. He was married twice, first to Emilia Rigogli by whom he had three sons and then to the painter Alessandra Furini. A collection of Salvadori's principal works curated by his son Francesco was published in 1668.

== Life and career ==
Frontispiece of Salvadori's libretto for La Flora

Salvadori was born in Florence in 1591. Like his fellow poet Gabriello Chiabrera, he was educated by the Jesuits at the Collegio Romano in Rome with financial support from Cosimo II de' Medici. Described by the 19th century Italian philologist Francesco Trucchi as "gifted in the sciences, very erudite and well-versed in Latin and Greek", Salvadori was a member of both the Accademia Fiorentina and the Accademia della Crusca by 1608. He began working for the Medici family in 1613 when he collaborated with four other poets to write verses for a mock battle performed in honour of the visiting Duke of Urbino. In 1616 he was given a permanent position as the principal court poet. In that capacity he provided the texts and libretti for numerous musical spectacles and court entertainments both sacred and secular, many of them marking royal occasions.

One of the distinguishing features of Salvadori's opera libretti was his extensive use of the chorus not only to conclude each act but also to link scenes within an act or to frame the singers' solo pieces. He was a pioneer in the sacred opera genre (azione sacra) for which he wrote La regina Sant'Orsola (The Queen Saint Ursula) in 1624 and Istoria di Iudit (The story of Judith) in 1626. According to musicologist Kelley Harness, La istoria di Iudit was the basis for Martin Opitz's libretto for Judith (1635) and may well have influenced Giulio Rospigliosi's later libretti on religious subjects. Rospogliosi had attended the performance of La istoria di Iudit marking Cardinal Francesco Barberini's visit to the Medici court. A notable example of Salvadori's secular operas was La Flora which was performed as part of the celebrations for the marriage of Margherita de' Medici and Odoardo Farnese, Duke of Parma in 1628.

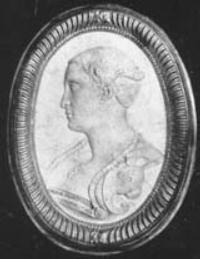
Francesca Caccini, whose lengthy feud with Salvadori began in 1620

The composers of La Flora, Marco da Gagliano and Jacopo Peri, had previously worked with him on other operas as had the singer and composer Francesca Caccini. According to the Florentine chronicler Andrea Cavalcanti, Salvadori and Caccini fell out when she began publicly ridiculing him for casting whatever female singer he was pursuing at the time. In reply, he wrote the misogynistic poem "Donne musiche parlano dall'Inferno" (Women musicians speak from Hell) which was probably performed at the court's Epiphany celebrations in 1621. Their feud continued over the casting of the 1625 revival of La regina Sant'Orsola and culminated in 1627 during the preparations for the wedding of Margherita de' Medici and Odoardo Farnese. The opera Salvadori had originally planned for the festivities was his Iole ed Ercole (Iole and Hercules) for which Jacopo Peri had composed the music. Caccini took her revenge by convincing Margherita and her mother, Grand Duchess Maria Maddalena, that the subject of the opera might be interpreted as reflecting Margherita's desire to control her new husband. Salvadori thus had to write a new libretto at relatively short notice—La Flora, based on the tale of Chloris and Zephyrus. Shortly thereafter, Caccini left the Medici court.

Although the overwhelming majority of Salvadori's theatrical works were performed in Florence for the Medici, at least two of them were performed elsewhere. His set of intermedi, Olimpia abbandonata da Bireno (Olimpia abandoned by Bireno), was performed in Parma in 1622 for the Farnese court, and his equestrian ballet La selva d'Armida (Armida's forest) was performed in Vienna in 1631 to celebrate the marriage of Maria Anna of Spain and Ferdinand III of Austria. Salvadori also had connections with the Gonzaga court in Mantua. As early as 1608 he had spent some time there and had written an ode to Francesco Gonzaga, Duke of Mantua during his stay. The Duke's sister, Eleonora had asked for a copy of his opera Lo sposalizio di Medoro e Angelica (The marriage of Medoro and Angelica) which had been performed in Florence in 1619, with a view to having it performed at Mantua. Her marriage to the Holy Roman emperor intervened and before she could receive a copy. However, Salvadori and his composer, Marco da Gagliano, sent a revised version of the work to Ferdinando Gonzaga in 1622. In the end, it was not performed, but the libretto was published in 1623 with the support of Ferdinando and was dedicated to him. According to Kirkendale, Salvadori received another invitation to the court in 1623 after Ferdinando and his wife Caterina de' Medici were sent copies of his sacred poetry.

In 1628 Salvadori married Emilia Rigogli, who belonged to a prominent Florentine family. (Her brother was the poet Benedetto Rigogli). The marriage produced three sons, Francesco (1630), Jacopo (1631), and Emilio (1633). Francesco became a priest and served as Cardinal Girolamo Farnese's copyist. He was also a poet and writer in his own right and published several works, including a collection of poetry and a treatise on Seneca, Il filosofo cortigiano. Four months after Emilia's death in December 1633, Salvadori married the painter Alessandra Furini, a sister of Francesco Furini. Andrea Salvadori died in August 1634 at the age of 43 and was buried in the Chiesa dei Santi Simone e Giuda in Florence where a marble plaque with his portrait was erected by his sons.

== Works ==
Scene from Act 1 of La regina Sant'Orsola in which Saint Ursula is surrounded by demons

Le Poesie del Sig. Andrea Salvadori, curated by Salvadori's son Francesco and published in 1668, included all the works published during his lifetime, as well as several previously unpublished poems. It has a dedication and preface by Francesco Salvadori with quoted descriptions of his father's character and poetic style by Gian Vittorio Rossi and Cardinal Sforza Pallavicino. The following is a list of Salvadori's principal works.

Opera libretti

- Lo sposalizio di Medoro e Angelica (The wedding of Medoro and Angelica), in a prologue and three acts, music by Marco da Gagliano and Jacopo Peri, performed 1619, revised version published 1623 as Medoro, (score lost). The libretto was performed as a comic play without music in 1626.
- La regina Sant'Orsola (The Queen Saint Ursula), in a prologue and five acts, music by Marco da Gagliano and Francesca Caccini, performed 1624, revived 1625 (score lost)
- Istoria di Iudit (The story of Judith), in a prologue and three acts plus two intermedi, music by Marco da Gagliano, performed 1626 (score lost)
- Iole ed Ercole (Iole and Hercules), music by Jacopo Peri, written 1627 (unperformed, libretto and score lost)
- La Flora, in a prologue and five acts, music by Marco da Gagliano and Jacopo Peri, performed 1628

Other theatrical works

The Medici court at the time of Salvadori was marked by the quantity and variety of its theatrical entertainments. The grandest of these were the feste (festivals) to celebrate great court occasions which incorporated instrumental music, solo and choral singing, dancing, and drama. Invariably involving lavish spectacle, they were often accompanied by public pageants and masquerades. The festa di ballo was centered on a ballet, the festa d'armi on mock battles, and the festa a cavallo on displays of horsemanship, including elaborately choreographed equestrian ballets. Smaller scale stage works included intermedi, cantatas, and sung narrative poems to accompany tournaments. These were often performed as part of a veglia (late evening entertainment). Unless otherwise indicated all of the performances below took place in Florence.

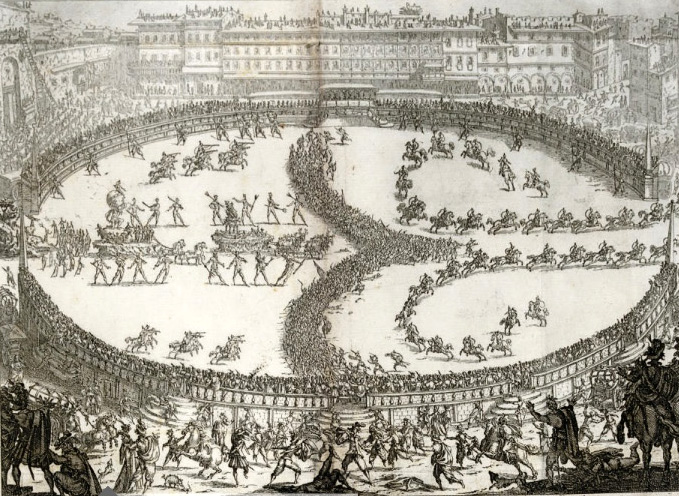
Equestrian ballet from Guerra di bellezza performed in the Piazza Santa Croce, 1616

- Comparsa d'Araspe, re de persiani (The appearance of Araspe, king of the Persians), festa performed February 1613
- Guerra d'amore (Battle of love), festa for Cosimo II de' Medici (with Cosimo II and his brother Lorenzo taking the roles of the rival kings Indamoro and Gradameto), performed during Carnival, February 1616
- Guerra di bellezza (Battle of beauty), festa a cavallo to mark the visit of Prince Federico Ubaldo of Urbino and his betrothal to Claudia de' Medici, performed October 1616
- La liberazione di Tirreno e d'Arnea, autori del sangue toscano (The liberation of Tyrrhenus and Arnea, founders of the Tuscan race), intermedi, music by Marco da Gagliano, performed at a royal veglia to mark the marriage of Ferdinando Gonzaga, Duke of Mantua and Caterina de' Medici, February 1617 (score lost)
- Canzonette in lode della Befana (Little songs in praise of the Befana) sung by Francesca Caccini during the Epiphany celebrations at the Medici court, 6 January 1620
- Olimpia abbandonata da Bireno (Olimpia abandoned by Bireno), intermedi based on an episode in Orlando Furioso, performed in Parma 1622
- Le fonti d'Ardenna (The springs of Ardennes), festa d'arme and festa di ballo to mark the visit of Henri, Prince of Condé, music by Marco da Gagliano and performed by members of the Accademia dei Rugginosi during Carnival 1623 (score lost)
- Canto d'Amore e di'Imeneo (Song of Cupid and Hymen), performed for the marriage of Count Francesco Bonsi and Cristina di Riario, 1624
- La precedenza delle dame (The precedence of the ladies), music by Jacopo Peri, performed during a tournament in honour of Sigismund III of Poland, 1625 (score lost)
- Il monte Atlante (Mount Atlas), Il contrasto de' venti (The dispute of the winds), L'isola degli Eroi (The island of the Heroes), La nave d'Argo (The ship of Argo), intermedi in praise of the House of Habsburg to mark the visit of Leopold V, Archduke of Austria, performed January 1626
- Il serraglio degl'amori (The cupids' seraglio), Epithalamium and ballet for the wedding Jacopo Salviati, Duke of San Giuliano and Veronica Cibo, performed 1628
- La disfida d'Ismeno (The challenge of Ismeno), festa performed for the marriage of Margherita de' Medici and Odoardo Farnese, Duke of Parma, 1628
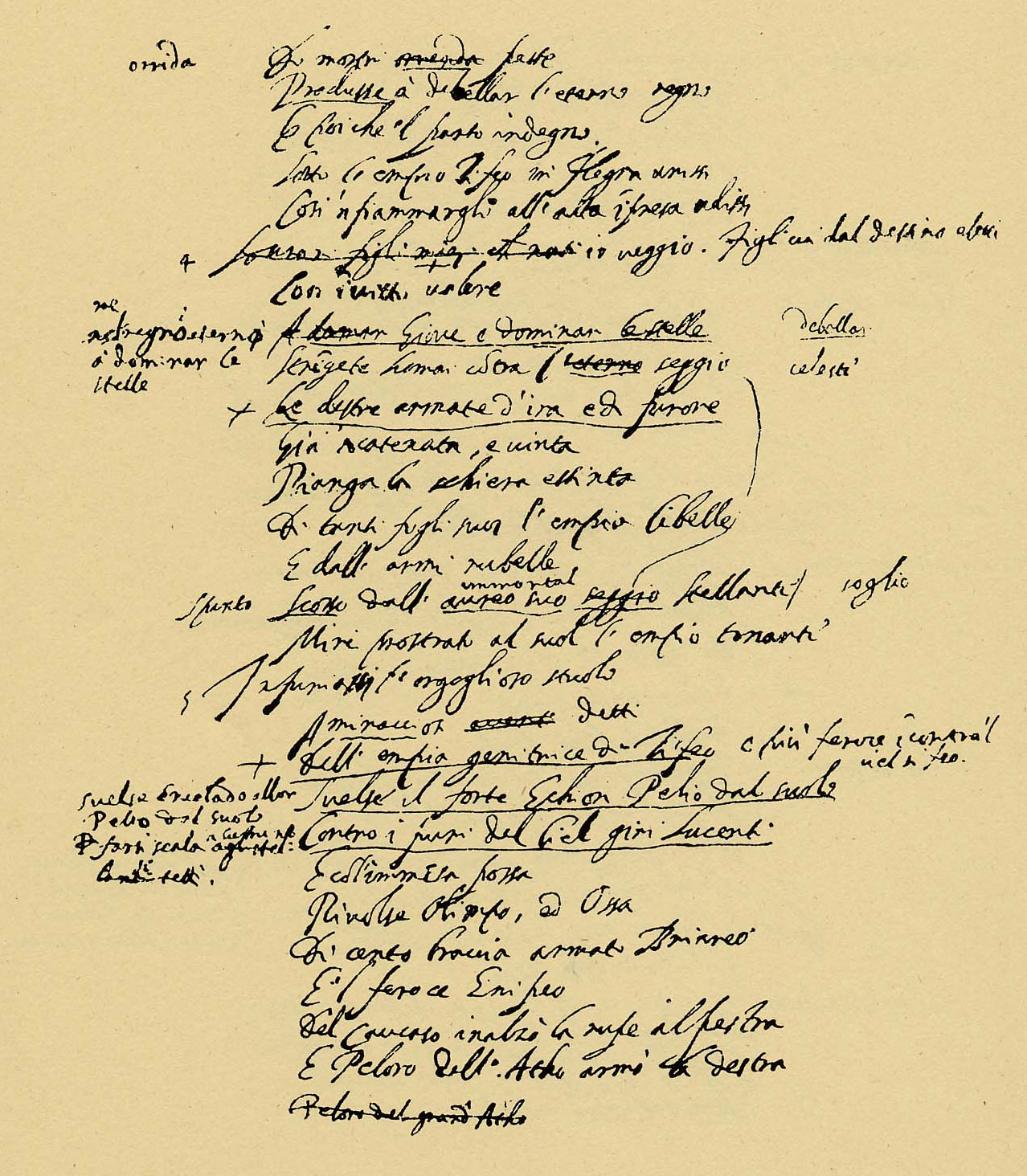
  Page from Galileo's copy of Salvadori's poem "Per le Stelle Medicee temerariamente oppugnate". The copy is made in Galileo's own hand with his corrections
- I caramogi (The dwarves), comic masquerade, performed August 1629
- Applausi del Sole, e d'Anfitrite (Applause from the Sun and Amphitrite), pastoral to mark the visit of Maria Anna of Spain, 1630
- La selva d'Armida (Armida's forest), equestrian ballet to celebrate the marriage of Maria Anna of Spain and Ferdinand III of Austria, performed in Vienna, 1631

Poems

- "Per le Stelle Medicee temerariamente oppugnate" (For the Medicean Stars rashly repudiated), written circa 1613. The poem is a defense of Galileo's discovery of Jupiter's moons (at the time called the Medicean Stars), the existence of which had been questioned by the Florentine astronomer Giovanni Magini. It was published posthumously in Le Poesie del Sig. Andrea Salvadori. The 20 volume complete works of Galileo edited by Antonio Favaro contains a facsimile of Galileo's own copy of the poem written in Galileo's hand with his corrections.
- "Il Danubio" (The Danube), panegyric on the accession of Ferdinand II as Holy Roman Emperor, September 1619
- "Il pianto di Toscana" (The tears of Tuscany), panegyric on the first anniversary of the death of Cosimo II de' Medici, recited by Salvadori in the Council Room of the Palazzo Vecchio on 28 February 1622
- "La Natura al Presepe" (Nature at the Nativity scene), sacred panegyric for Christmas Day, published 1623
- Fiori del Calvario (Flowers of Calvary), sonnets on the passion of Christ, published 1623. This collection of sonnets, like "La Natura al Presepe", was dedicated to Princess Maria Maddalena de' Medici who had entered a convent.
- Sonetti in lode del campo imperiale e in morte del re di Svezia (Sonnets praising the imperial battle field and the death of the King of Sweden), published 1633. The title refers to the 1632 Battle of Lützen in which Gustavus Adolphus, the Protestant King of Sweden, was killed by the forces of the Holy Roman Empire.
- "I corsali vinti" (The corsairs defeated), panegyric on the victory of the ships of Saint Stephen over the Turks, date unknown, published posthumously in Le Poesie del Sig. Andrea Salvadori 1668
