= Maddalena Aceiaiuoli =

Tuscan noblewoman and poet (1557–1610)

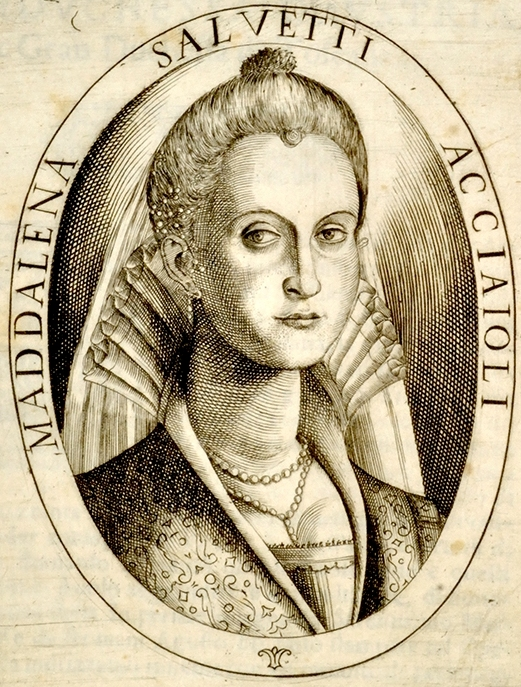
- Born: 25 March 1557 Florence, Grand Duchy of Tuscany
- Died: 4 March 1610 (aged 52) Florence, Grand Duchy of Tuscany
- Occupation: Noblewoman and poet
- Notable works: Rime Toscane (1590); Il David perseguitato o vero fuggitivo (1611)
- Spouse: General Zanobi Acciaiuoli (m. 1582)
- Children: 1

Maddalena Salvetti Aceiaiuoli (25 March 1557 – 4 March 1610) was a 16th-century noblewoman and poet from the Grand Duchy of Tuscany.

== Family ==
Coat of arms of the Acciaioli family

Aceiaiuoli was born to Lucrezia and Salvetto Niccolini on 25 March 1557 in Florence, Grand Duchy of Tuscany. She became a member of the noble Acciaioli family by her 1582 marriage to General Zanobi Aceiaiuoli, an official of the Grand Duchy and Knight of St. Stephen. They had one son, Mario Aceiaiuoli, who was born on 25 August 1583.

== Writing ==
In 1590, Aceiaiuoli published Rime Toscane (Tuscan Rhymes) in honour of the marriage between Ferdinando I de' Medici and Christina of Lorraine. She used sixteen different rhyme schemes.

Aceiaiuoli also wrote the heroic poem Il David perseguitato o vero fuggitivo (David persecuted) on the theme of the biblical King David, which was dedicated to the Tuscan princess Maria Maddalena de’ Medici. The unfinished epic was published posthumously in 1611, after she had died in 1610.

Cornelio Lanci dedicated his comedy La Niccolosa (1591) to Aceiaiuoli. A biography of the nun Birgitta of Sweden was translated into Italian vernacular for Aceiaiuoli by Lodovico Domenichi as a gift. The translation was not printed or circulated.
