= Francesca Caccini =

Italian composer

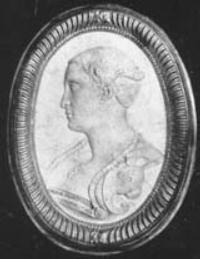
Francesca Caccini.

Francesca Caccini (Italian: [franˈtʃeska katˈtʃiːni]; 18 September 1587 – most likely between 1641 and 1645) was an Italian composer, singer, lutenist, poet, and music teacher of the early Baroque era. She was also known by the nickname La Cecchina [la tʃekˈkiːna], given to her by the Florentines and probably a diminutive of Francesca. She was the daughter of Giulio Caccini. Her only surviving stage work, La liberazione di Ruggiero, is widely considered the oldest opera by a woman composer. As a female composer she helped to solidify the agency and the cultural and political programs of her female patron.

== Personal life ==
=== Early life ===
Caccini was born in Florence on September 18, 1587. She received a humanistic education (Latin, some Greek, as well as modern languages and literature, mathematics) in addition to early musical training with her father. According to Liliana Panella, the first well-founded testimony of Francesca's singer's activity, together with her sister Settimia, at the Medici court, is 1602: in his diary Cesare Tinghi notes that on 3 April 1602 St. Nicholas church in Pisa, where the court moved every year during Lent, polychoral music was directed by "Giulio Romano, having the wife (the second wife, Margherita) and the two daughters singing well".

In her early life, Caccini performed with her parents, her half-brother Pompeo, her sister Settimia, and possibly other unnamed Caccini pupils in an ensemble contemporaries referred to as le donne di Giulio Romano. She most likely would sing in the 1600 production of L’Euridice, an opera which had sections by her father, sung by his students (most of the music was composed by Jacopo Peri). In the same year she also sang in her father's Il rapimento di Cefalo (“The Abduction of Cephalus”), composed to a libretto by Gabriello Chiabrera. She then was hired by the court where she continued to perform with the family ensemble until Settimia's marriage and resulting move to Mantua caused its breakup. Caccini served the Medici court as a teacher, chamber singer, rehearsal coach and composer of both chamber and stage music until early 1627. By 1614 she was the court's most highly paid musician, in no small part because her musical virtuosity so well exemplified an idea of female excellence projected by Tuscany's de facto Regent, Grand-Duchess Christina of Lorraine. By 1623 she earned 240 scudi. The Italian scuda/scudi were pre-unification coins that were in circulation in different Italian areas—money made of silver or gold which was very precious and represented the power and the wealth of the region long before the modern Italy accepted coins of only one national currency.

=== Later life ===
After Caccini's first husband (Giovanni Battista Signorini, with whom she had one daughter, Margherita, in 1622) died in December 1626, she quickly arranged to marry again in October 1627, this time to a music-loving nobleman in Lucca, Tommaso Raffaelli. Although her legal name remained Francesca de Giulio Caccini, it was only the discovery of documents using Francesca Raffaelli that makes it possible to find evidence of her life from 1627 to 1634. She lived in Raffaelli's Lucchese homes, apparently bearing a son (also Tommaso, in 1628), and having some musical relationship to the Buonvisi family in Lucca, until his death in 1630. Although as the wife of a nobleman she had declined at least one request to perform (in Parma, in 1628), once she was widowed Caccini immediately tried to return to serve the Medici court. Her return delayed by the plagues of 1630–33, by 1634 Caccini was back in Florence with her two children, serving as music teacher not only to her daughter Margherita but also to the Medici princesses who lived at or frequently visited the convent of La Crocetta, and composing and performing chamber music and minor entertainments for the women's court. Caccini stopped serving the Medicis on 8 May 1641, and disappeared from the public record.

== Professional career ==
Caccini is believed to have been a quick and prolific composer, equal in productivity to her court colleagues Jacopo Peri and Marco da Gagliano. Very little of her music survives. Most of her stage music was composed for performance in comedies by poet Michelangelo Buonarroti the Younger (grand-nephew of the artist) such as La Tancia (1613), Il passatempo (1614) and La fiera (1619). In 1618 she published a collection of thirty-six solo songs and soprano/bass duets (Il primo libro delle musiche) Il primo libro delle musiche is undoubtedly the primary document that underscored Francesca Caccini's importance as a composer of the new Florentine style, and her skill. These compositions are organized into two parts based on the table of contents. The first part entitled "spirituali" or spiritual is dedicated to the sacred text and the two sonnets, four madrigals, an aria, one ottave remanesca, one ottave sopra la romanesca, three cheerful arias, five motets, and two hymns are amongst the most significant compositions. The title of the second part is "temporali" or temporal that consists of secular text and softer melodies, such as canzonette, motetti, and hinni. Giulio Caccini also arranged his Le nuove musiche in a similar way: The front part of the book is composed for madrigals (the dramatic sections almost like an recitativo "cantante") and the back section, for aria (the lighter and strophic forms). As canzonette, motetti, and hinni. The book's content very much resembled the style of the contemporary composer Caccini, as he was also reconsidering his Le nuove musiche in a way that the front part of the book consisted of madrigals (the more dramatic sections were almost linking to recitativo "cantante"), and the back section, for aria (the lighter and strophic forms) that were represented. that is a compendium of contemporary styles, ranging from intensely moving, harmonically adventurous laments to joyful sacred songs in Italian and Latin, to witty strophic songs about the joys and perils of romantic love.

In winter 1625 Caccini composed all the music for a 75-minute "comedy-ballet" entitled La liberazione di Ruggiero dall'isola d'Alcina which was performed for the visiting crown prince of Poland, Ladislaus Sigismondo (later Władysław IV). Combining witty parodies of early opera's stock scenes and self-important characters with moments of surprising emotional intensity, the score shows that Caccini had mastered the full range of musico-theatrical devices in her time and that she had had a strong sense of large-scale musical design. La liberazione so pleased the prince that he had it performed in Warsaw in 1628. This is also widely regarded as the first opera written by a woman. There is no evidence to suggest that Caccini composed any of the accompanying poetry, however, which is instead by her contemporaries Michelangelo Buonarroti, Andrea Salvadori and Francesco Gualterotti.

=== Compositional style ===
Caccini's musical and compositional style has been likened to that of Monteverdi and Jacopo Peri, and she started composing music after the closing of the Renaissance period, playing a key part in developing the Baroque style of music. She composed within a very innovative musical context. For many of her songs, she was the author of the accompanying poetry, which also tended to be comedic.

Although the musical pieces did not denote a specific instrument for playing the accompaniment, a theorbo could be used.

== Works ==
Francesca Caccini wrote some or all of the music for at least six staged works. All but La liberazione di Ruggiero and some excerpts from La Tancia and Il passatempo published in the 1618 collection are believed lost. Her surviving scores reveal Caccini to have taken extraordinary care over the notation of her music, focusing special attention on the rhythmic placement of syllables and words, and on the precise notation of often very long, melodically fluid vocal melismas. Although her music is not especially notable for the expressive dissonances made fashionable by her contemporary Monteverdi, Caccini was a master of dramatic harmonic surprise: in her music it is harmony, more than counterpoint, that most powerfully communicates affect.

Opera and stage works:

- La Stiava (performed 1607) (lost)
- La mascherata, delle ninfe di Senna, balletto, Palazzo Pitti, Florence, 1611
- La tancia, incidental music, Palazzo Pitti, Florence, 1611
- Il passatempo, incidental music to balletto, Pallazo Pitti, Florence, 1614
- Il ballo delle Zingane, balletto, Palazzo Pitti, Florence, music lost, 1615
- Il Primo libro delle musiche a 1–2 voci e basso continuo (1618)
- La fiera, incidental music, Palazzo Pitti, Florence, 1619
- Il martirio de S. Agata, Florence, 1622
- La liberazione di Ruggiero dall'isola d'Alcina, musical comedy, Villa Poggio Imperiale, Florence (1625)
- Rinaldo inamorato, commissioned by Prince Wladislaw of Poland, 1626.

== See also ==
- Settima Caccini
- Women in Music
- List of classical music composers by era
