= Alfonso Parigi =

Italian architect and scenographer

Alfonso Parigi the Younger (1606–1656) was an Italian architect and scenographer, the son of Giulio Parigi, and grandson of Alfonso Parigi the Elder.

He worked mainly in Florence, beginning at a very early age as his father's assistant. After the latter's death in 1635, he became court architect of the Grand Dukes of Tuscany at Palazzo Pitti, where he led the completion of the Giardini di Boboli, building the Isolotto and the steps of the amphitheatre.

He also worked in the church of San Giovannino degli Scolopi, the basilica of Santo Spirito, and the Medici villas at Poggio a Caiano and Careggi.

== Sources ==
- Opere di Filippo Baldinucci: Notizie de'professori del disegno da Cimabue in qua By Filippo Baldinucci, Domenico Maria Manni, page 439.
- Bryan's dictionary of painters and engravers, Volume 4 By Michael Bryan, George Charles Williamson, page 68.
- Media related to Alfonso Parigi jr at Wikimedia Commons
