= Alfonso Parigi the Elder =

Alfonso Parigi (died 1590) was an Italian architect and designer working in Florence for the Grand Duke of Tuscany.

His major commission was the completion of Giorgio Vasari's Palazzo degli Uffizi. His main works are all in Florence, and include:

- The palazzo of the Archiconfraternità di Misericordia, an ancient charitable foundation devoted to helping the wounded and sick, rebuilt 1575–78, partly remodelled ito designs by Stefano Diletti, 1781.
- At Santa Trinita he rebuilt the convent cloister, working to designs of Buontalenti, beginning in 1584.

His son Giulio worked also as architect for the House of Medici.
