= Maria Maddalena de' Medici =

Tuscan Royal

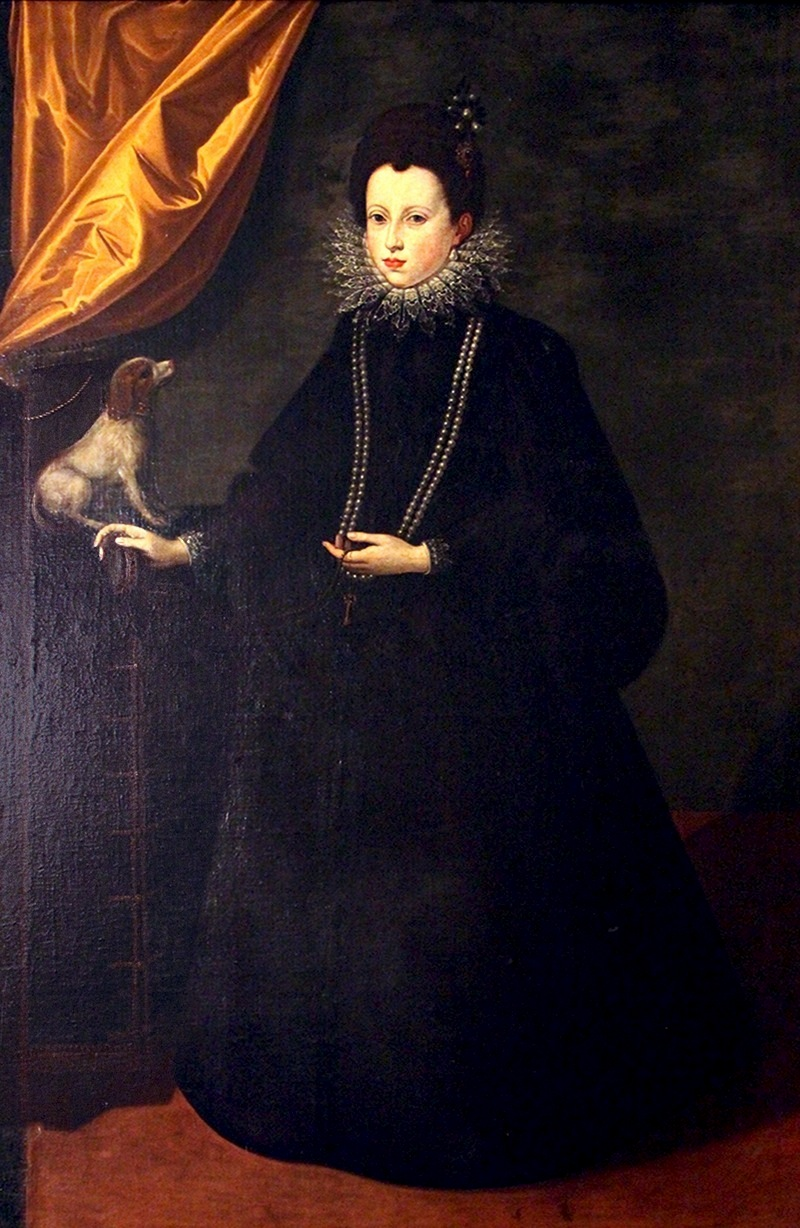
- Portrait painted around 1615
- Born: 29 June 1600; Pitti Palace, Florence
- Died: 28 December 1633 (aged 33); Florence
- House: Medici
- Father: Ferdinando I de' Medici, Grand Duke of Tuscany
- Mother: Christina of Lorraine

Maria Maddalena de' Medici (29 June 1600 – 28 December 1633) was a Tuscan princess, the eighth child and third daughter of Ferdinando I and Christina of Lorraine, making her the sister of Cosimo II.

== Life ==
Born disabled, she was christened at the age of nine. On 24 May 1621, she entered the Palazzo della Crocetta, attached to the Convento della Crocetta (Convent of the Little Cross, now the National Archaeological Museum), though she never took the monastic vows. When she died, she was buried there.

== Aboveground passages ==
Maria Maddalena had difficulties climbing stairs. The rooms built for her at the monastery by the architect Giulio Parigi were connected by a series of raised passages above street level across which she could move without use of stairs and, as an added bonus, there was no need to cross the uneven and crowded street. Today four arches of one of these passages remain. They resemble covered bridges (ponti) or skybridges between upper floors of buildings:

- one opposite the Ospedale degli Innocenti,
- one above via della Pergola,
- one above via Laura (to reach another monastery), and
- one into the Basilica della Santissima Annunziata (where, sitting in a small chamber at the end of the passage, she could watch the mass through a grate in the left wall of the nave).

In the Palazzo della Crocetta was a similar, long elevated corridor, called the corridoio mediceo, which Maddalena used to move among the remaining first floor rooms. This corridor was reminiscent of the Vasariano.

== Sources ==
- Biagioli, Beatrice; Stumpo, Elisabetta, eds. (2015). Lettere alla figlia Caterina de' Medici Gonzaga duchessa di Mantova (1617-1629) (in Italian). Firenze University Press. ISBN 9788866557319.
- Cusick, Suzanne G. (2015). Francesca Caccini at the Medici Court: Music and the Circulation of Power. University of Chicago Press. ISBN 9780226338101.

== See also ==
- Passetto di Borgo, Rome
- Vasari Corridor, also in Florence
- Maria Cristina de' Medici, niece of Maria Maddalena, also born with a disability
- Maddalena Aceiaiuoli, Tuscan poet who dedicated a work to Maria Maddalena
