= Marco da Gagliano =

Italian composer (1582–1643)

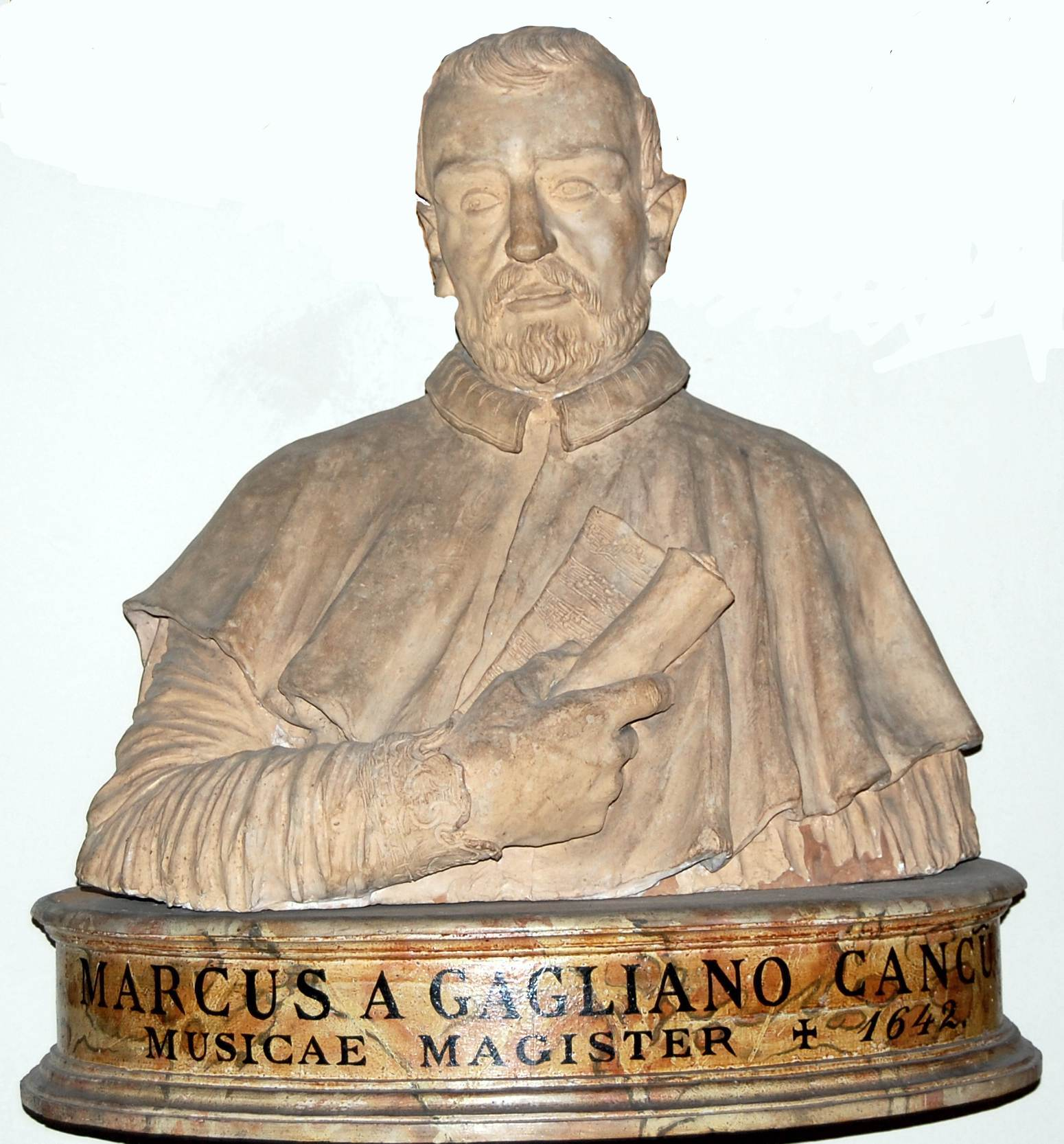
Marco da Gagliano

Marco da Gagliano (1 May 1582 – 25 February 1643) was an Italian composer of the early Baroque era. He was important in the early history of opera and the development of the solo and concerted madrigal.

== Life ==
Gagliano was born on 1 May 1582 in Florence and lived most of his life there. After study with a religious confraternity and Luca Bati, he was employed for six years from 1602 by the church of San Lorenzo as a singing instructor. In 1607, he went to Mantua, where he wrote music for the Gonzaga family, including his impressive operatic setting of La Dafne.

In 1609, he returned to Florence to become maestro di cappella at the Compagnia dell'Arcangelo Raffaello, the organisation from which he had received his boyhood musical training. Later that same year, the Medici made him maestro di cappella of their court, a position he held for 35 years. He died on 25 February 1643.

== Music and influence ==
Gagliano wrote an enormous quantity of music, both sacred and secular, for the Medici; in addition, he was a singer and instrumentalist who entertained them privately. His works include fourteen published operas, of which two survive, La Flora (1628) set to a libretto by Andrea Salvadori and La Dafne (1608). La Dafne was praised as the best setting of the libretto by Rinuccini—even by Jacopo Peri, the first to write an opera on the text. Meanwhile, Gagliano or somebody else revised Rinuccini's poetry for the libretto so extensively that in some places it is impossible to find traces of the original. Peri indicated that Gagliano's way of setting text to music came closer to actual speech than any other, therefore accomplishing the aim of the Florentine Camerata of decades before, who sought to recapture that (supposed) aspect of ancient Greek music.

Other music by Gagliano includes secular monodies and numerous madrigals. While the monody was a Baroque stylistic innovation, most of the madrigals are a cappella, and written in a style reminiscent of the late Renaissance (in the first decades of the 17th century, the continuo madrigal was becoming predominant; for example, in the works of Monteverdi). This mix of progressive and conservative trends can be seen throughout his music: some of his sacred music is a cappella, again in the prima prattica style of the previous century, while other pieces show influence of the Venetian School.

Gagliano was extremely influential in his time, as could be expected of the Medicis' head of all musical activities at their court; however, his popularity waned after his death, and his music has since been overshadowed by contemporaries such as Monteverdi.
