= Cappella Artemisia =

Italian all-female vocal group

Cappella Artemisia is an Italian all-female vocal group specializing in the music of the convents of 17th-century Italy. The group was founded by the American, but resident in Italy, singer and musicologist Candace Smith. Smith is also co-publisher, with her husband cornettist Bruce Dickey of editions of this music through Artemisia Editions. The main repertoire of the group focuses on nun composers themselves - including Raphaella Aleotti, the first nun to publish as a composer, Maria Xaveria Perucona and Isabella Leonarda (both Ursulines), Chiara Margarita Cozzolani and Rosa Giacinta Badalla (both from the Milan convent of Santa Radegonda), Sulpitia Cesis (from the Augustinian convent of S. Geminiano in Modena), Alba Tressina, Lucrezia Orsina Vizzana and Caterina Assandra. The ensemble also performs works of the male composers - some monks, some secular - who dedicated works to the convents.

== Discography ==
- Rosa Mistica – musiche delle monache lombarde del‘600. Smith (TC.600003)
- Raphaella Aleotti a.k.a. Vittoria Aleotti – Le monache di San Vito. The Nuns of San Vito. Works by nun composers and by Ercole Pasquini, Lorenzo Agnelli, Giovanni Battista Chinelli, Giovanni Battista Mazzaferrata. Smith (TC.570101)
- Chiara Margarita Cozzolani – I vespri natalizi. Christmas Vespers (1650). Smith (TC.600301)
- Canti Nel Chiostro – Musica nei monasteri femminili di Bologna. Smith (TC.600001)
- Cesis Sulpitia Mottetti Spirituali (1619). Smith (TC.572801)
- Soror mea, sponsa mea – Canticum Canticorum nei Conventi. Works by nun composers and Giovanni Paolo Cima, Adriano Banchieri, Sisto Reina, Benedetto Re, Agostino Soderini, Francesco Martini. Smith (TC.560002)
- Scintillate, amicae stellae: Christmas in the Convents of 16th- and 17th-century Italy. Works by nun composers and by Francesco Rognoni Taeggio, Andrea Rota, Tiburzio Massaino, Sisto Reina, Daniel Speer, Domenico Massenzio. Tactus 280003 2011
- Weep and Rejoice: Music for Holy Week from the Convents of 17th-Century Italy. Works by nun composers and by Adriano Banchieri, Alessandro Della Ciaia, Giovanni Legrenzi, Maurizio Cazzati, Lorenzo Agnelli, Giovanni Antonio Grossi, Agostino Soderini, Tiburzio Massaino, Giulio Cesare Arresti, Giovanni Battista Strati, Domenico Massaino. Brilliant Classics 946.38 2014

The ensemble is also accompanied by an instrumental consort. For their 2011 release of Christmas music the line-up for the ensemble was singers: Elena Biscuola, Pamela Lucciarini, Anna Simboli, Candace Smith, Patrizia Vaccari, Silvia Vajente, Barbara Zanichelli, Francesca Bagli, Federica Di Leonardo. Plus Davide Monti, Elisa Bestetti (violins), Sofia Ruffino, Bettina Hoffmann, Sofia Gonzato (viola da gamba), Silvia Moroni (flute), Maria Christina Cleary (baroque harp), Stefano Rocco (theorbo, baroque guitar) and Miranda Aureli (organ, harpsichord).
