= Tremolo =

Trembling sound effect

Tremolo notation (denoting rapid repetition) Play (repetition) Play (variation in volume)

In music, tremolo (Italian pronunciation: [ˈtrɛːmolo]), or tremolando ([tremoˈlando]), is a trembling effect. There are multiple types of tremolo. It is either the rapid repetition of a note, alternation between two different notes, or variation in volume.

Tremolos may be either measured, in which the exact rate of repetition or oscillation is specified, or unmeasured, in which it is not (the understanding being in that case that it should be performed as rapidly as possible).

== Types of tremolo ==
=== Rapid reiteration or oscillation ===
The rapid reiteration of a single note is a characteristic effect of bowed string instruments, obtained by rapidly moving the bow back and forth. However, the technique may be performed on any instrument on which it is practicable. (Indeed, a slow measured tremolo is simply a shorthand notation for an ordinary repetition of notes; thus, tremolo notation may appear in written music for any instrument.)

The notation for this effect consists of one or more strokes drawn through the stem of a note (or, if the note lacks a stem, through the position that a hypothetical stem would occupy); the strokes correspond to the beams that would connect the individual repeated notes if they were to be written out, thereby representing the rate of repetition (the speed of the tremolo).

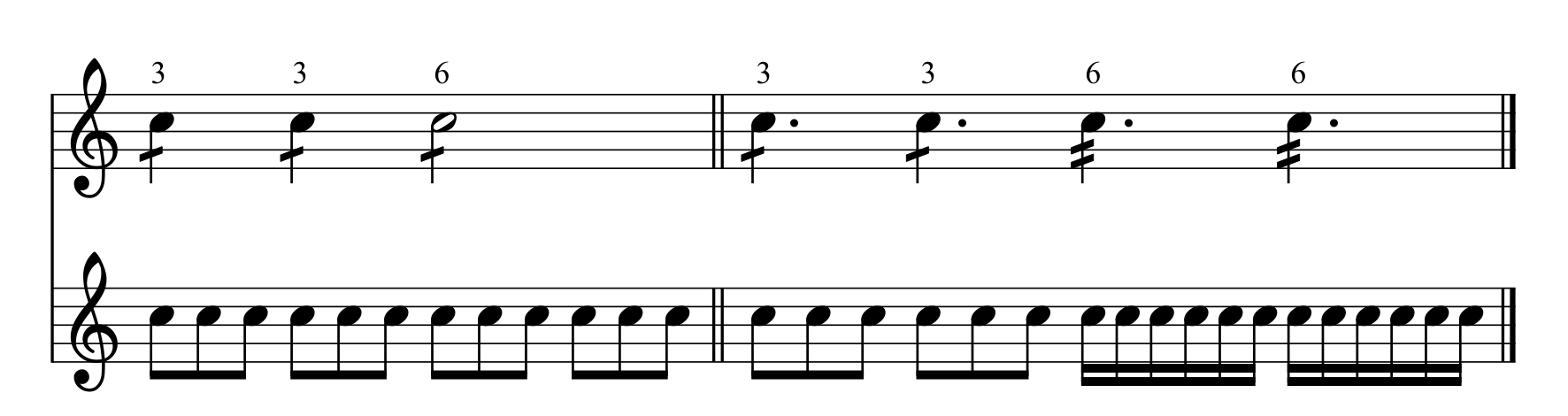
Tremolo examples (repeated notes)

Some special cases are worth noting:

- On plucked strings such as on a harp, the word bisbigliando (Italian pronunciation: [bizbiʎˈʎando]) or "whispering" is used. Tremolo picking, on traditionally plucked string instruments including guitar and mandolin, is the rapid articulation of single notes or a group of notes with a plectrum (pick) or with fingers. Tremolo playing sustains notes that would otherwise rapidly decay (fade to silence).
- The technique of flutter-tonguing on wind instruments is analogous to an unmeasured tremolo on strings, and notated similarly.
- The roll on percussion instruments is one of the most familiar examples. On unpitched instruments, as well as timpani, it may be notated as either a tremolo or a trill — a fact suggestive of the close relationship between tremolos and trills (see below).

A rapid alternation between two different pitches is another type of tremolo. On bowed string instruments, this is referred to as a fingered tremolo to distinguish it from the bowed tremolo discussed above; but once again it may be performed on any instrument. It is notated by writing the pitches to be alternated as a melodic interval, with both notes receiving the rhythmic value of the total duration of the tremolo (e.g. two half-notes for a tremolo lasting a half-note), and then either connecting them with beams, or else interpolating strokes, with the number of beams or strokes corresponding to the speed of the tremolo (e.g. a tremolo in thirty-second notes lasting a half-note would be written either as two open noteheads connected by three beams, or as two half-notes with three strokes interpolated).

Tremolo examples (alternating notes)

This type of tremolo includes the trill as a special case: a trill is simply an unmeasured tremolo between two notes separated by the interval of a major or minor second (whole- or half step). Thus, a tremolo in this sense is a generalization of a trill to any interval, and to include measured durations.

=== Amplitude variation ===
Video of a tremolo effect pedal, producing a cycling variation of volume, played with an electric guitar

A separate type of tremolo is a variation in amplitude:

- As produced on organs by tremulants
- Using electronic effects in guitar amplifiers and effects pedals which rapidly turn the volume of a signal up and down, creating a "shuddering" effect
- An imitation of the same by strings in which pulsations are taken in the same bow direction
- A vocal technique involving a wide or slow vibrato, not to be confused with the trillo or "Monteverdi trill"

Tremolo is sometimes used interchangeably with vibrato. However, a tremolo is a variation of volume (or amplitude); as contrasted with vibrato, which is a variation of pitch (or frequency).

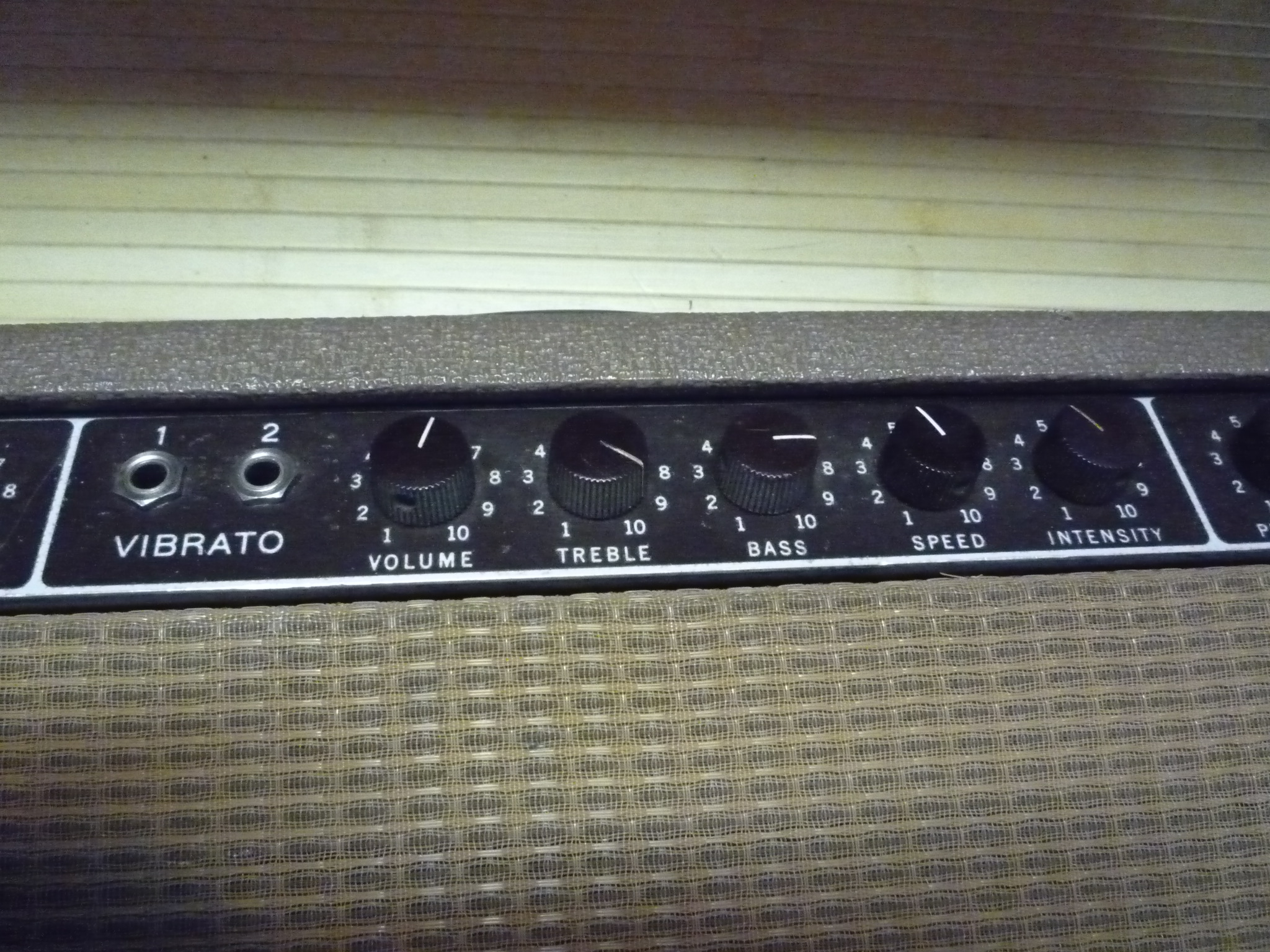
"Vibrato" channel on a 1960s Fender Pro Amp Brownface electric guitar amp. The effect produced is actually a tremolo.

Some electric guitars (in particular the Fender Stratocaster) use a lever branded a "tremolo arm" or "whammy bar" that allows a performer to lower or (usually, to some extent) raise the pitch of a note or chord, an effect properly termed vibrato or "pitch bend". This non-standard misuse of the term "tremolo" refers to pitch rather than amplitude. However, the term "trem" or "tremolo" is still misused to refer to a bridge system built for a whammy bar, or the bar itself. True tremolo for an electric guitar, electronic organ, or any electronic signal would normally be produced by a simple amplitude modulation electronic circuit, or in terms of analog synthesis, a VCA under control of an LFO. Electronic tremolo effects were available on many early guitar amplifiers. Fender labeled them Vibrato, adding to the confusion between the two terms. Tremolo effects pedals are also widely used to achieve this effect.

Most settings on a tremolo effects pedal include depth of the tremolo (sometimes called intensity) and speed of the tremolo. Some models allow to choose the shape of the waveform (sine wave, triangle wave, square wave).

== History ==
Although it had already been employed as early as 1617 by Biagio Marini and again in 1621 by Giovanni Battista Riccio, the bowed tremolo was invented in 1624 by the early 17th-century composer Claudio Monteverdi, and, written as repeated semiquavers (sixteenth notes), used for the stile concitato effects in Il combattimento di Tancredi e Clorinda. The measured tremolo, presumably played with rhythmic regularity, was invented to add dramatic intensity to string accompaniment and contrast with regular tenuto strokes. However, it was not till the time of Gluck that the real tremolo became an accepted method of tone production. Four other types of historical tremolos include the obsolete undulating tremolo, the bowed tremolo, the fingered tremolo (or slurred tremolo), and the bowed-and-fingered tremolo.

The undulating tremolo was produced through the fingers of the right hand alternately exerting and relaxing pressure upon the bow to create a "very uncertain–undulating effect ... But it must be said that, unless violinists have wholly lost the art of this particular stroke, the result is disappointing and futile in the extreme," though it has been suggested that rather than as a legato stroke it was done as a series of jetés.

There is some speculation that tremolo was employed in medieval Welsh harp music, as indicated in the transcription by Robert ap Huw.

== Notation ==
In musical notation, unmeasured tremolo is usually notated as regular repeated notes (measured tremolo) of very short duration: so short as to preclude confusion with an actual measured tremolo. Commonly, for example, the duration used will be demisemiquavers (thirty-second notes). In this case, there will be three strokes through the stems of the notes, except on notes which already have beams or flags: quavers (eighth notes) then take two slashes, and semiquavers (sixteenth notes) take one.

In the case of semibreves (whole notes), which lack stems, the strokes or slashes are drawn above or below the note, where the stem would be if there were one.

In slower tempos (and/or meters with larger denominators), notes of shorter duration (corresponding to additional strokes) would be used. To eliminate ambiguity as to whether an unmeasured tremolo or regular repeated demisemiquavers (thirty-second notes) should be played, the word tremolo or the abbreviation trem., is sometimes added.

If the tremolo is between two or more notes, both notes are given the full value of the passage and the bars are drawn between them:

As shown above, a minim (half note)-based tremolo is sometimes drawn with beams connecting the two notes together rather than interpolated bars (strokes).

=== Bowed string instruments ===
Violin fingered tremolo; notice the joining of strokes and stems is different for different time values, and that some notes shorter than eighth notes are written out, such as the last thirty-second notes on the last beat of measure three:

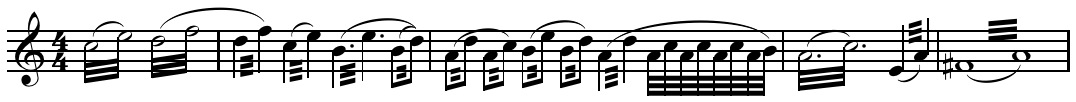
Fingered tremolo notation

Violin bowed-and-fingered tremolo, notated the same as fingered tremolo but without slurs and with staccato above the staff:

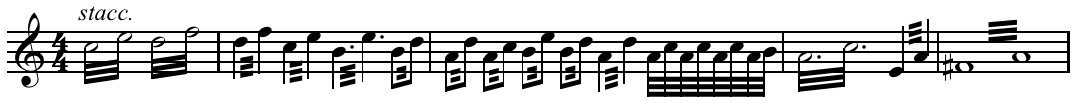
Bowed-and-fingered tremolo notation

== See also ==
- Arpeggio, a chord played one note after the other
- Flexatone
- Leslie speaker, a rotating speaker horn producing a tremolo and vibrato effect
- Drum rolls are the percussive equivalent of tremolo
