= Crotti =

Crotti is an Italian surname. Notable people with the surname include:

- Ambrogio Crotti, Italian musician
- Archangelo Crotti, (fl. 1608), composer
- Carlo Crotti (1900–19??), Italian footballer
- Jean Crotti (1878–1958), French painter
