= Stile antico =

Manner of musical composition

Stile antico (literally "ancient style", Italian pronunciation: [ˈstiːle anˈtiːko]), is a term describing a manner of musical composition from the sixteenth century onwards that was historically conscious, as opposed to stile moderno, which adhered to more modern trends. Prima pratica (Italian, 'first practice') refers to early Baroque music which looks more to the style of Palestrina, or the style codified by Gioseffo Zarlino, than to more "modern" styles. It is contrasted with seconda pratica music. These terms are synonymous to stile antico and stile moderno, respectively.

== History ==
Stile antico has been associated with composers of the high Baroque and early Classical periods of music, in which composers used controlled dissonance and modal effects and avoided overtly instrumental textures and lavish ornamentation, to imitate the compositional style of the late Renaissance. Stile antico was deemed appropriate in the conservative confines of church music, or as a compositional exercise as in J. J. Fux's Gradus Ad Parnassum (1725), the classic textbook on strict counterpoint. Much of the music associated with this style looks to the music of Palestrina as a model.

The term prima pratica was first used during the conflict between Giovanni Artusi and Claudio Monteverdi about the new musical style. For 18th-century composers such as Johann Sebastian Bach, stile antico can refer to music composed as late as the early years of that century (e.g. by Antonio Lotti, Pietro Torri), a style Bach would imitate more frequently in his later compositions (starting in the 1730s, up to his death in 1750).

=== Monteverdi's era ===
In the early Baroque Claudio Monteverdi and his brother coined the term prima pratica to refer to the older style of Palestrina, and seconda pratica to refer to Monteverdi's music. The terms were used to distinguish contrasting approaches to musical composition and the treatment of text and harmony during the period.

At first, prima pratica referred only to the style of approaching and leaving dissonances. In his Seconda parte dell'Artusi (1603), Giovanni Artusi writes about the new style of dissonances, referring specifically to the practice of not properly preparing dissonances (see Counterpoint), and rising after a flattened note or descending after a sharpened note. In another book, his L'Artusi, overo Delle imperfettioni della moderna musica (1600) ("The Artusi, or imperfections of modern music") Artusi had also attacked Monteverdi specifically, using examples from his madrigal "Cruda Amarilli" to discredit the new style.

Monteverdi responded in a preface to his fifth book of madrigals, and his brother Giulio Cesare Monteverdi responded in Scherzi Musicali (1607) to Artusi's attacks on Monteverdi's music, advancing the view that the old music subordinated text to music, whereas in the new music the text dominated the music. Old rules of counterpoint could be broken in service of the text. According to Giulio Cesare, these concepts were a harkening back to ancient Greek musical practice.

=== 18th–19th century ===
The great composers of the late Baroque all wrote compositions in the stile antico, especially Bach. His Mass in B minor has sections written in stile antico which contrast with up-to-date Baroque idioms. Later composers such as Haydn and Mozart also used stile antico. Beethoven's Missa Solemnis, written after the composer's study of Palestrina, is a late flowering of the style; Beethoven integrates stile antico in various sections of his mass, through the employment of devices such as cantus firmus, church modes and plagal cadences, with the music constantly flowing in imitative polyphony.

==== Late Baroque ====
For 18th-century composers such as Bach, stile antico can refer to music composed as late as the early years of that century, for example by Antonio Lotti and Pietro Torri. Bach's interest in this style grew in the 1730s, and in the last two decades of his life (1730s–1740s) he would write in this style more frequently, leading to an outspoken style shift in this composer's work around 1740.

== Sources ==
- Stephen R. Miller. "Stile antico", Grove Music Online, ed. L. Macy (accessed March 19, 2006), grovemusic.com (subscription access).
- Claude V. Palisca. "Prima pratica", Grove Music Online, ed. L. Macy (accessed March 19, 2006), grovemusic.com (subscription access).
- Grout, Donald J. A History of Western Music (6th ed.), W.W. Norton and Company, New York, 2001. ISBN 0-393-97527-4
- Wolff, Christoph (1968). Stile antico in der Musik Johann Sebastian Bachs: Studien zu Bachs Spätwerk [Stile antico in the music of Johann Sebastian Bach: Studies on Bach's late work]. Beihefte zum Archiv für Musikwissenschaft (in German). Vol. VI. Wiesbaden: Steiner. OCLC 651793960.
