= Cesis (disambiguation) =

Cesis may refer to:

- Cēsis, a town in Latvia
- Cēsis municipality, Latvia
- Cēsis Castle, Latvia
- Cēsis district, Latvia
- SK Cēsis, a women's basketball club, Latvia
- Sulpitia Cesis, Italian renaissance composer
- CESIS, (Executive Committee for Intelligence and Security Services) an Italian government committee
