= Giovanni Artusi =

Italian composer

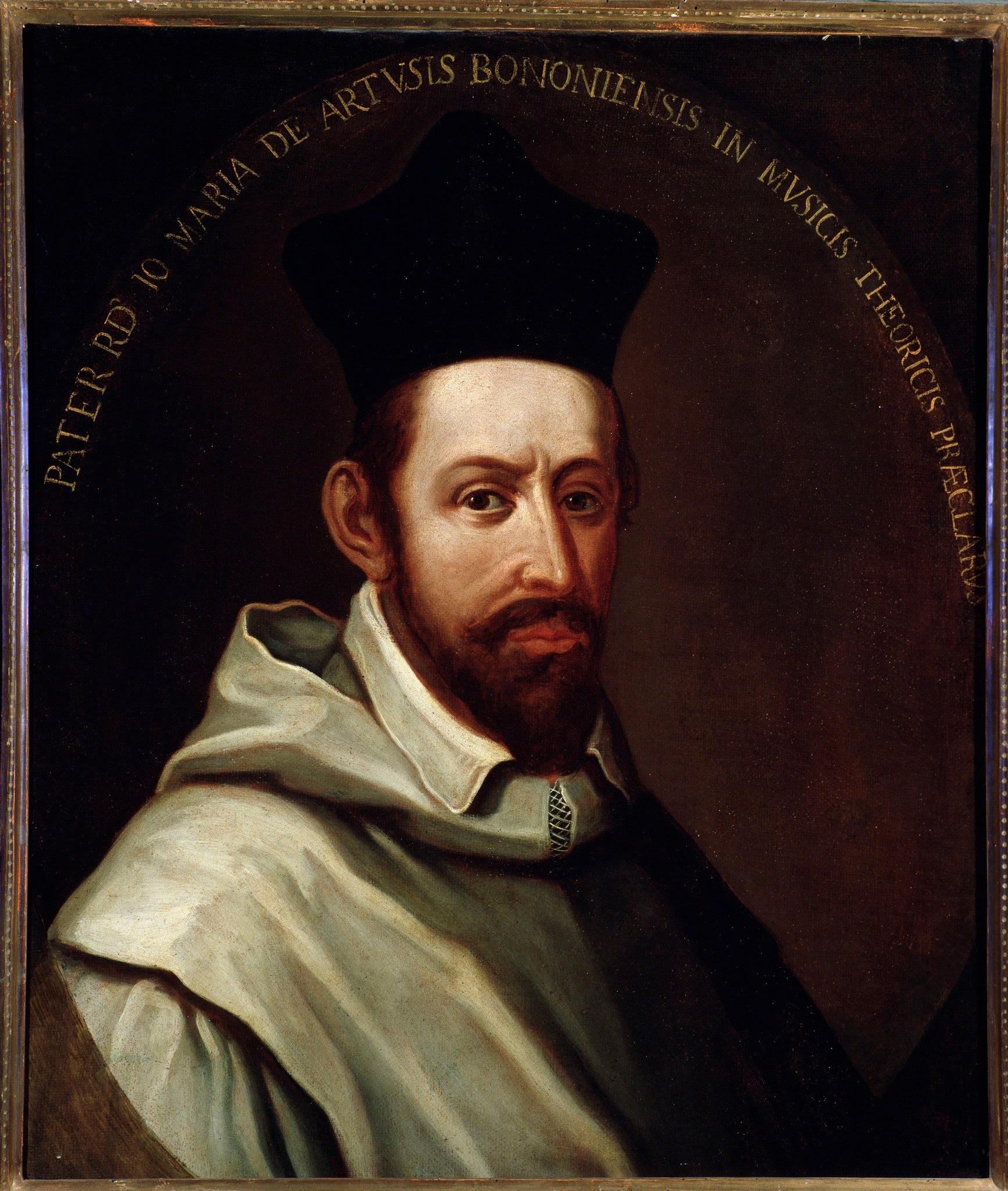
- Born: c. 1540
- Died: 18 August 1613

Giovanni Maria Artusi (c. 1540 – 18 August 1613) was an Italian music theorist, composer, and writer.

Artusi fiercely condemned the new musical innovations that defined the early Baroque style developing around 1600 in his treatise L'Artusi, overo Delle imperfettioni della moderna musica [Artusi, or On the Imperfections of Modern Music]. He was also a scholar and cleric at the Congregation Santissimo Salvatore, Bologna, and remained throughout his life devoted to his teacher Gioseffo Zarlino (the principal music theorist of the late sixteenth century). When Vincenzo Galilei first attacked Zarlino in the Dialogo of 1581, it provoked Artusi to defend his teacher and the style he represented.

In 1600 and 1603, Artusi attacked the "crudities" and "license" shown in the works of a composer he initially refused to name (it was Claudio Monteverdi). Monteverdi replied in the introduction to his fifth book of madrigals (1605) with his discussion of the division of musical practice into two streams: what he called prima pratica, and seconda pratica: prima pratica being the previous polyphonic ideal of the sixteenth century, with flowing counterpoint, prepared dissonance, and equality of voices; and seconda pratica being the new style of monody and accompanied recitative, which emphasized soprano and bass voices, and in addition showed the beginnings of conscious functional tonality.

Artusi's major contribution to the literature of music theory was his book on dissonance in counterpoint, L'Arte del contraponto (1598) He recognized that there could be more dissonance than consonance in a developed piece of counterpoint, and he attempted to enumerate the reasons and uses for the dissonances, for example as settings of words expressing sorrow, pain, longing, terror. Ironically, the usage of Monteverdi in the seconda pratica largely agreed with his book, at least conceptually; the differences between Monteverdi's music and Artusi's theory were in the importance of the different voices, and the exact intervals used in shaping the melodic line.

Artusi's compositions were few, and in a conservative style: one book of canzonette for four voices (published in Venice in 1598) and Cantate Domino for eight voices (1599).

In 1993, Suzanne Cusick presented a feminist analysis of the Artusi controversy in which she asserted that Artusi's attack on Monteverdi represented "an attempt to discredit modern music as unnatural, feminine and feminizing of both its practitioners and its listeners". Claudio Monteverdi's and his brother's replies, she claims, "can be understood as a defense of the composer's masculinity that acknowledges and reaffirms the femininity of the music itself". Other academics, such as Ilias Chrissochoidis and Charles S. Brauner, have challenged Cusick's analysis as selective and incomplete: "[A]nyone can project anything to the past for the purpose of legitimising one's own set of values or even fixations".
