= Lucrezia Orsina Vizzana =

Italian composer

Lucrezia Orsina Vizzana (also "Lucretia") (3 July 1590 – 7 May 1662) was an Italian singer, organist, and composer. She entered the Camaldolese convent of Santa Christina in Bologna in 1598. She was taught by her aunt, Camilla Bombacci, who was the convent organist, and by Ottavio Vernizzi, who was the unofficial music master. Vizzana's works are influenced by stile moderno (seconda prattica) music, especially the works of Claudio Monteverdi.

== Biography and works ==
Lucrezia Orsina Vizzana was born on July 3, 1590 in Bologna, Italy to Ludovico Vizzana and Isabetta Bombacci. She entered the Camaldolese convent of Santa Christina in 1598 following her mother's death and adopted the religious name Donna Lucrezia Orsina (or Ursula), where it is believed she learned music from her aunt, Camilla Bombacci, the convent organist, and Ottavio Vernizzi, unofficial music director of the convent.

Vizzana's motets were published in Componimenti musicali de motetti concertati a l e più voci in 1623, the only collection of music ever published by a Bolognese nun. There are ten solo motets, eight duets, one trio, and one quartet all with continuo. The works feature other characteristics of the stile moderno. Furthermore, many convents used motets for double choir as a way of exploiting the musical gifts of the nuns in reaction to the decree from the Council of Trent that nuns must be confined within a convent, although Vizzana’s publications did not include works for double choir. Vizzana's O invictissima Christi martir, along with Sonet vox tua in auribus cordis mei; Usquequo oblivisceris me in finem; O magnum mysterium; Ornaverunt faciem templi; Domine Dominus noster, quam admirabile; and Protector noster can all be found in Martha Furman Schleifer and Sylvia Glickman's Women Composers: Music through the Ages. However, Vizzana's music also reflects a much older practice of female spirituality stretching back to the later Middle Ages as opposed to the new post-Tridentine religious traditions for women. Most of her motets were created for feast days, reflecting many liturgical, artistic, and devotional moments in convent life. However, other motets allude to the inner strife in the convent and its decline from 1620 onward.

In 1622, an anonymous letter was sent to the Cardinal Archbishop Ludovico Ludovisi in Rome reporting many scandals and issues in the convent, especially the issue of conflict within the convent. These allegations were followed by a long investigation of the convent that caused much inner strife amongst the nuns. It was revealed that much of the inquietude and rivalries amongst the nuns resulted from the musical life of the convent. It is often believed that the stress of the turmoil led to Vizzana's early retirement from music and mental instability.

== Notes ==
1.Also spelled Vizana
