= Concerto Palatino =

Wind ensemble in Bologna, Italy

The Concerto Palatino was a wind ensemble and important civic institution in Bologna associated with San Petronio. The band performed morning and evening concerts in the city.

== History ==
The Concerto Palatino began in the 13th century as a group of eight trumpeters. In the late 15th century trombones were added to the band. The form of the Concerto Palatino was then fixed from 1537 to 1779 as eight trumpets, four pifari or shawms or later cornets, four trombones, two viols, and drums. The members also served as teachers at the Liceo.

=== Early music group ===
The name Concerto Palatino was resurrected in 1986 by cornettist Bruce Dickey and trombonist Charles Toet, as one of the first historically informed performance ensembles performing the repertoire of the original alta capella ensembles.
