= Seconda pratica =

Renaissance/Baroque style of musical composition

Seconda pratica, Italian for "second practice", is the counterpart to prima pratica (or stile antico) and is sometimes referred to as stile moderno. The term seconda pratica first appeared in 1603 in Giovanni Artusi's book Seconda Parte dell'Artusi, overo Delle imperfettioni della moderna musica (The Second Part of The Artusi, or, Imperfections of Modern Music), where it is attributed to a certain L'Ottuso Accademico.

== Overview ==
In the first part of The Artusi (1600), Artusi had severely criticized several unpublished madrigals of Claudio Monteverdi. In the second part of this work, L'Ottuso Accademico, whose identity is unknown, defends Monteverdi and others "who have embraced this new second practice". Monteverdi adopted the term to distance some of his music from that of e.g. Giovanni Pierluigi da Palestrina and Gioseffo Zarlino and to describe early music of the Baroque period which encouraged more freedom from the rigorous limitations of dissonances and counterpoint characteristic of the prima pratica.

Stile moderno was coined as an expression by Giulio Caccini in his 1602 work Le nuove musiche which contained numerous monodies. New for Caccini's songs were that the accompaniment was completely submissive in contrast to the lyric; hence, more precisely, Caccini's stile moderno-monodies have ornamentations spelled out in the score, which earlier had been up to the performer to supply. Also this marks the starting point of basso continuo which also was a feature in Caccini's work.

In the preface of his fifth Book of Madrigals (1605) Monteverdi announced a book of his own: Seconda pratica, overo perfettione della moderna musica (Second Practice, or, Perfection of Modern Music). Such a book is not extant. But the preface of his eighth Book of Madrigals (1638) seems to be virtually a fragment of it. Therein Monteverdi claims to have invented a new “agitated” style (genere concitato, later called stile concitato) to make the music "complete/perfect" ("perfetto").
