= Azzolino Bernardino della Ciaja =

Italian composer

To be distinguished from an earlier Sienese composer Alessandro Della Ciaia (c. 1605 - c. 1670)

Azzolino Bernardino della Ciaja (21 May 1671 – 15 January 1755) was an Italian organist, harpsichordist, composer and organ builder.

== Life ==
Born in Siena, into a rich family, he was a member of the Pisan Cavalieri di S Stefano order. He lived in Pisa from 1703 and 1713, but kept strong connections with Florence. In 1713, he moved to Rome, where he stayed till 1730. He then moved back to Pisa, where he died.

An expert in organ building, he worked on the organ of Santo Stefano dei Cavalieri, a large 5- manual and more than 60 stop organ.

Very important are the Six Sonatas for Harpsichord published in Rome in 1727.

== Works ==
=== Vocal works ===
- Cantate da camera, op. 2 (Lucca, 1701)
- Cantate da camera op. 3 (Bologna, 1702), lost
- De suoi tormenti in seno (Pisa, 1704)
- Chi non sa morire (cantata)
- Bella imago (cantata)
- Lungi dal caro bene (cantata), Pisa, 1709

=== Sacred works ===
- Salmi concertati, op. 1 (Bologna, 1700)
- Mass (Ky, Gl, Cr), 4 voices, 1696
- Mass, 4–5vv, 1739
- Mass (Ky, Gl, Cr), 4vv, nd
- I trionfi di Giosuè (pasticcio), Florence 1703, lost

=== Instrumental works ===
- Sonate per cembalo con alcuni saggi ed altri contrapunti di largo e grave stile ecclesiastico per grandi organi, op. 4 (Rome, 1727?)

== Sources ==
- Italian Wikipedia page
- Carolyn Gianturco's article in New Grove Dictionary of Music

== Discography ==
Opera omnia for keyboard. Harpsichordist: Mara Fanelli - Organist: Olimpio Medori, Romani-Agati-Tronci organ with three keyboards and double pedals from Gavinana (Pistoia) - Tenore: Paolo Fanciullacci (3 CD, Tactus, 2016)
