= Sisto Reina =

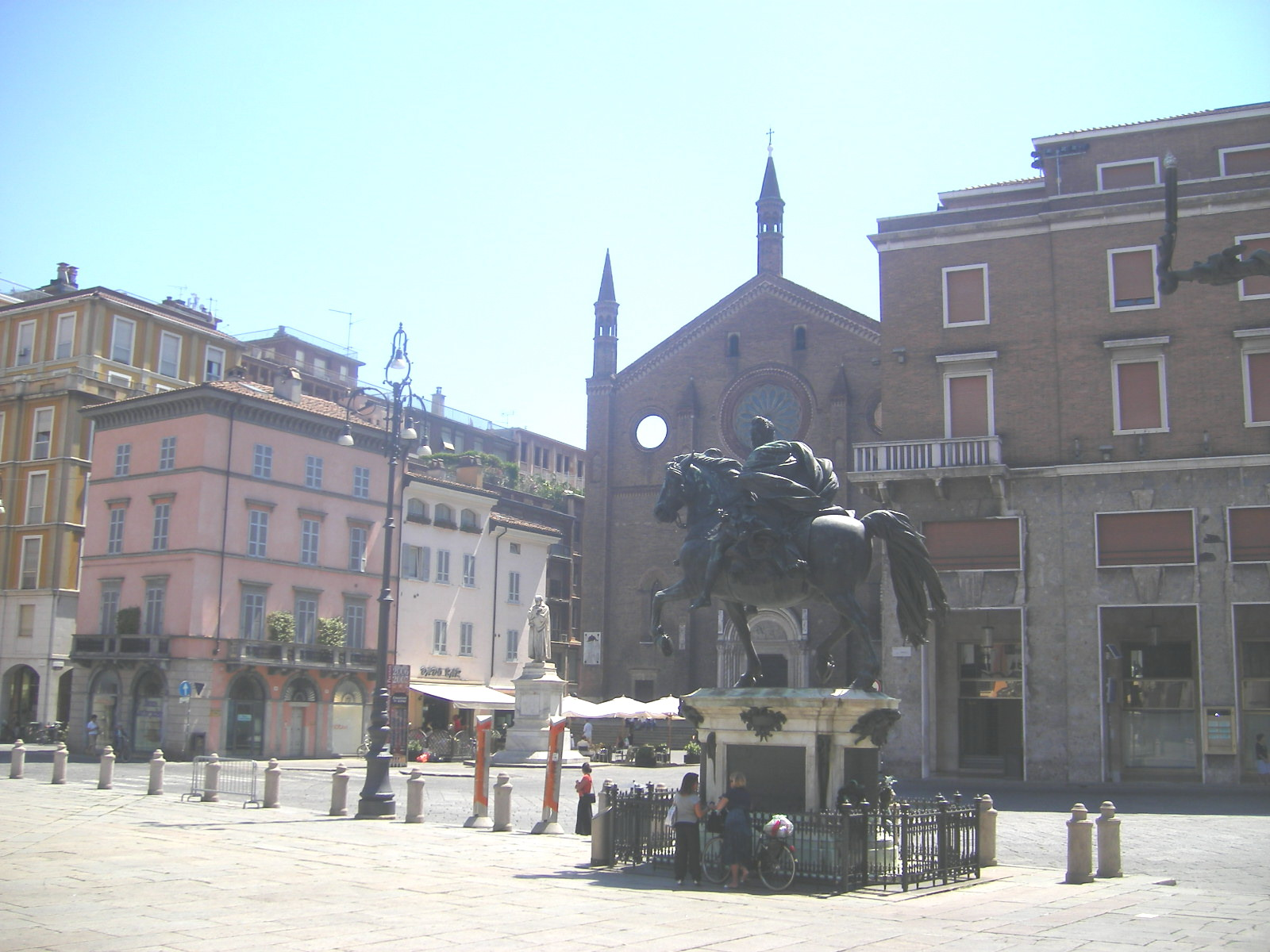
Basilica of San Francesco in the Piazza Cavalli, Piacenza

Sisto Reina (Saronno 1623? — Modena after 1664) was an Italian composer, minorite monk, and organist. His musical publications were made while he was maestro di cappella in the church of S. Francesco in Piacenza.

== Works, editions and recordings ==
- «Novelli fiori ecclesiastici, Mottetti e Messe a 8, op. prima, Milano 1648».

Recordings

- Dialogo di Lazzaro - on Canti nel Chiostro, Cappella Artemisia dir. Candace Smith (musicologist). Tactus
- Surge filiae Sion - on Soror mea, Sponsa mea: Canticum Canticorum nei Conventi Capella Artemisia dir. Candace Smith. Tactus 2005
- De profundis clamavi - on Schätze aus Uppsala Les Cornets Noirs, Raumklang 2011
- Armonia Ecclesiastica op.5 Concentus Vocum Tactus 2016
