= Il combattimento di Tancredi e Clorinda =

1624 operatic scena by Monteverdi

- Operatic scena by Claudio Monteverdi
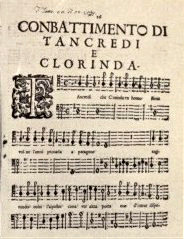
- Printed part
- Catalogue: SV 153
- Language: Italian
- Based on: La Gerusalemme Liberata by Torquato Tasso
- Performed: 1624
- Published: 1638
- Scoring: three voices; divided strings; continuo

Il combattimento di Tancredi e Clorinda (The Combat of Tancredi and Clorinda), SV 153, is an operatic scena for three voices by Claudio Monteverdi. The libretto is drawn from Torquato Tasso's La Gerusalemme Liberata. It was first performed in Venice in 1624, and printed in 1638 in Monteverdi's eighth book of madrigals. Monteverdi used musical features here for the first time to enhance the dramatic depiction of a battle in stile concitato, such as pizzicato and tremolo.

== History ==
The libretto is drawn from Torquato Tasso's La Gerusalemme Liberata (Jerusalem Delivered)., Canto XII, 52–62, 64–68), a chivalric romance set against the backdrop of the First Crusade, when Godfrey of Bouillon and his allies conquered Jerusalem. Monteverdi composed it for the 1624 Carnival of Venice when it was first performed in the palace of Girolamo Mocenigo.

The plot is about a Christian knight, Tancredi, and a Saracen girl, Clorinda, who are lovers, but meet in battle not recognizing each other because their faces are covered by armour. Tancredi hits Clorinda mortally, and realizes only after removing her helmet who she is. He baptizes her before she dies, and she sees Heaven opening. A narrator (testo – 'text') tells about most of the action, but the combatants should also act.

Il combattimento was printed in 1638, with several other pieces in Monteverdi's eighth book of madrigals which were written over a period of many years.

=== Music ===
Excerpt from the Combattimento (battle music)
Live recording

In Il combattimento, the voices and instruments form two separate entities. The strings are divided into four parts instead of the then usual five – an innovation that was not generally adopted by European composers until much later. The music begins with madrigals. Monteverdi tried to create the "agitated" style (concitato) which Plato described in his Rhetoric: "Take that harmony that would fittingly imitate the utterances of a brave man who is engaged in warfare". Different sounds convey the battle, such as the trotting of a horse, trumpet fanfares, the combatants circling each other, and the movement of their swords. For the last of these, the music has the first written-out pizzicato, in which the players are instructed to set down their bows and use two fingers of their right hand to pluck the strings. To illustrate excitement, he arrived at the earliest use of string tremolo, in which a note is played in fast repetition. Monteverdi had difficulties getting the players to perform it correctly.
