= Bruce Dickey =

American cornett player

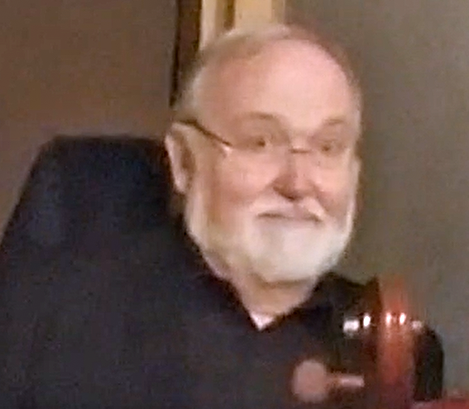
Bruce Dickey photographed in Montréal, Québec, Canada at the Bon-Pasteur Historic Chapel.

Bruce Dickey is an American cornett player. He is regarded as the doyen of the modern generation of cornett players, many of whom were his students at the Schola Cantorum Basiliensis and Early Music Institute at Indiana University, or students of his students. In 1987 he founded the ensemble Concerto Palatino with the Dutch baroque trombonist Charles Toet, following the name of the original eight-man Concerto Palatino della Signoria di Bologna of San Petronio which was famed from 1530 to 1800. He is married to the American singer and conductor Candace Smith, with whom he founded Artemisia Editions, which specializes in publishing editions of 17th-century Italian sacred music.

He attended Indiana University School of Music.
