= Alessandro Della Ciaia =

Italian composer

- Born: c. 1605
- Died: c. 1670
- Notable work: Madrigali Op. 1 Venice; Lamentatione sagre Op. 2; Sacri modulatus Op. 3 inc. Lamentatio virginis
- Style: Baroque

To be distinguished from a later composer Azzolino Bernardino della Ciaia (1671-1755)

Alessandro Della Ciaia (c. 1605-c. 1670) was an Italian nobleman and amateur composer.

He obtained texts to his madrigals through membership of literary academies in Siena.

== Works ==
- Madrigali Op. 1 Venice (1636)
- Lamentatione sagre Op. 2 (1650)
- Sacri modulatus. Op. 3 inc. Lamentatio virginis, (1666)

== Selected discography ==
- Lamentatio virginis, 1666 on Love and Lament Netherlands Bach Society Jos van Veldhoven, Channel Classics CCS 17098
- Lamentationi Sagre op.2, 1650, Roberta Invernizzi & Laboratorio '600, Glossa Music, GCD 922903
