= Vittoria Aleotti =

Italian composer

Vittoria Aleotti (c. 1575 – after 1620), believed by some scholars to be the same as Raffaella Aleotti (c. 1570 – after 1646), was an Italian Augustinian nun, a composer and organist of the late Renaissance and early Baroque periods. She is recognized as one of the earliest known female composers to have works published, contributing to the development of sacred and secular vocal music.

Aleotti was a nun at the Convent of San Vito in Ferrara, where she composed and performed music. Her published works include madrigals and sacred motets, notably appearing in the 1593 collection Il giardino de’ musici di Donne. Some scholars believe she may also have been the composer known as Raffaella Aleotti, who published a collection of sacred motets in 1593.

Her contributions to music were significant in an era when female composers were rare, and her works remain a subject of interest in studies of women in Renaissance music.

== Early life ==
She was born in Ferrara to the prominent architect Giovanni Battista Aleotti, and was mentioned in his will, written in 1631. According to her father, Vittoria became interested in music after listening to her older sister being taught music. Within a year, Vittoria had mastered instruments, mainly the harpsichord, and voice so well that she was sent to train with Alessandro Milleville and Ercole Pasquini. At the age of 6 or 7, after working with Pasquini, it was suggested that Vittoria be sent to Ferrara's San Vito, a convent famous for fostering musical talents. By the age of 14, Vittoria chose to enter the convent and dedicate her life to service.

== Identity controversy ==
Giovanni Battista Aleotti is said to have had five daughters. Although there is no record of a daughter named Raffaella, it has been assumed that Vittoria changed her name once she dedicated herself to service. There are many accounts that suggest that Vittoria and Raffaella are two different sisters while others that assert that the two are the same woman.

This confusion of identity arises from Giovanni, who wrote the dedication for Vittoria in her only published book of music. In it he suggests that while his oldest daughter was being prepared to become a nun and trained in music, his younger daughter, Vittoria, overheard and took a liking to music. With this knowledge, some suggest that Vittoria and Raffaella are two different women. To support this assertion, many have written that it was highly unlikely that the same woman would publish two books of different music under two different names. In addition, Vittoria entrusted the dedication of her works to her father, while Raffaella took full responsibility of writing her own dedication, suggesting the actions two different personalities.

After 1593, Vittoria disappears from the historical record, while Raffaella gained tremendous fame for her musical abilities to perform and to lead.

== Works ==
In 1591, Vittoria published a single madrigal (Di pallide viole), in a musical anthology: Il giardino de musici ferraresi. Two years later, she set music to eight poems by Giovanni Battista Guarini, which her father later sent to Count del Zaffo, who had them printed in Venice by Giacomo Vincenti. This book of madrigals was entitled Ghirlanda de madrigali a quatro voci. Aleotti was the first of at least 19 composers to set the text "T'amo mia vita" to music.

In the same year as Vittoria published her book of madrigals, Raffaella published a book of motets. Printed by Amadino in 1593, Sacrae cantiones quinque, septem, octo, & decem vocibus decantande, was the first book of sacred music by a woman to appear in print, and contains eighteen motets; thirteen quintets, two septets, two octets, and one motet for ten voices. Aleotti wrote and arranged the motets in Latin.

== Style ==
Raffaella was renowned for her skills at the organ and also well known in playing other instruments such as the harpsichord, the trombone, and other wind instruments. She was relentlessly praised by Ercole Bottrigari as having the talent and the skills to lead an ensemble of twenty-three nuns; she was also the Maestra at the convent until her death. Raffaella enjoyed complex music and would often use harmony and dissonance to heighten the text. However, she was at times criticized because some thought that as the music became more complex by utilizing more voices, the holiness of the music disappeared and gave way to pleasure.

== Extant works ==
- Motet: Angelus ad pastores ait (text of Luke 2:10-11)
- Motet: Ego flos campi (a 7 vv), R. Aleotti
- Il giardino de musici ferraresi (1591)
- Sacrae cantiones quinque, septem, octo, & decem vocibus decantande (1593) Book of Motets for five, seven, eight, and ten voices.
- Ghirlanda de madrigali a quatro voci (1593). Book of Madrigals for four voices
  - Renditions of her songs are available on many CDs including O Dulcis Amor.
