= Archangelo Crotti =

Italian composer

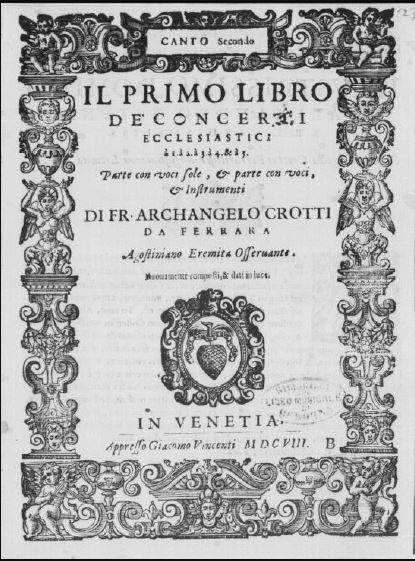
Archangelo Crotti - Primo libro de' concerti ecclesiastici (Venice, 1608) - title page

Archangelo Crotti, (first name sometimes spelled Arcangelo) was a composer and monk, who was active in 1608 at Ferrara in Italy.

In 1608, he published, in Venice, his Primo libro de' concerti ecclesiastici (First book of church concerts) including music in 1, 2, 3, 4, and 5 parts, with instrumental accompaniments. The instruments specified include cornetts, trombones and violins. The "Sancta Maria" from this collection anticipates the texture of the "Sonata sopra Sancta Maria" of Claudio Monteverdi's Vespro della Beata Vergine of 1610.
