= Ercole Pasquini =

Italian composer

Ercole Pasquini (ca. 1560 – between 1608 and 1619) was an Italian composer and organist.

== Biography ==
Pasquini was born at Ferrara, and studied with Alessandro Milleville (1521?-1589). He was described by Agostino Superbi (1620) as a most clever and excellent musician and organist. "He had a very nimble hand; and sometimes played so splendidly that he enraptured the people and truly amazed them." In the 1580s, Pasquini took over the musical instruction of the daughters of Giovan Battista Aleotti, court architect of Ferrara, from Milleville.

On 1 May 1592, Pasquini became the organist of the ridotti of Mario Bevilacqua and of the Olivetian church, Santa Maria in Organo, in Verona. While he held these positions, he wrote and published a favola boscareccia entitled I fidi amanti (Verona, 1593) in anticipation of the wedding of Don Carlo Gesualdo and Eleonora d'Este which took place in Ferrara the following year (1594). Upon the death of Bevilacqua, Pasquini apparently returned to Ferrara, where he succeeded Luzzasco Luzzaschi as organist of the Accademia della Morte. He was succeeded in this position by Girolamo Frescobaldi.

On 6 October 1597, Pasquini was elected organist to the Capella Giulia at St. Peter's Basilica in Rome. During the summer and fall of 1604, he assumed the same position at the Santo Spirito in Sassia, continuing his duties at St. Peter's. Beginning in 1603, there appears some irregularity in his signing for his payment, from the Capella Giulia. Nicolo Pasquini, possibly a son, signed from time to time from September 1603 over the next two years. During the summer of 1605, his payments were signed by the maestro di capella, Francesco Soriano, and in November and December, the attendant of the hospital, where Pasquini was being treated, signed. On 19 May 1608, Pasquini was dismissed from his post for "just causes." In an account by Agostino Faustini in 1646, Pasquini died insane in Rome.

== Published works ==
About thirty pieces for the keyboard have been preserved in manuscript copies. No autographs have survived and none were published during his lifetime. Among the items which have come down to us are 6 toccatas, 2 durezze, 9 or 10 canzonas, 5 sets of variations, 3 dances, and an intabulation of Cipriano de Rore's madrigal Ancor che co'l partire. These works show Pasquini to be a highly original composer, in many respects foreshadowing the keyboard works of his younger compatriot, Girolamo Frescobaldi. His Durezze are the earliest known of their type.

Of his vocal works, only five were published during his lifetime or shortly afterward. The madrigal Mentre che la bell'Isse of 1591, appears as a contrafact motet Sanctus Sebastianus in a Passau collection. Two motets, including the impressive ten-voice Quem viditis pastores?, were included in a publication by his student, Raffaella Aleotti in 1593. A spiritual madrigal M'empio gli occhi di pianto, to a text by Angelo Grillo, appeared in 1604, and the final work, published after his death, is Jesu decus angelicum for four voices and organ.

== Bibliography ==
- Ercole Paquini, Collected Keyboard Works, ed. by W. Richard Shindle; Corpus of Keyboard Music 12 (American Institute of Musicology, 1966)
- W. Richard Shindle: "The Vocal Works of Ercole Pasquini", Frescobaldi Studies, ed. Alexander Silbiger. (Durham, NC, Duke University Press, 1987).
- James L. Ladewig: "The Origins of Frescobaldi's Variation Canzonas Reappraised", ed. Alexander Silbiger. (Durham, NC, Duke University Press, 1987).
- Anthony Newcomb: "Frescobaldi's Toccatas and Their Stylistic Ancestry", Proceedings of the Royal Musical Association, cxi (1984–85), pp. 28–44.
- W. Richard Shindle: "Pasquini, Ercole", The New Grove Dictionary of Music and Musicians, 2nd, ed., vol. 19 (Macmillan Publishers, 2001)
- C. Ann Clement, Massimo Ossi, Thomas W, Bridges: "Introduction" to Raffaella Aleotti: Sacre Cantiones, Quinque, Septem. Octo, & Decem Vocibus Decantandae, Music at the Courts of Italy 2, (New York & Williamstown, The Broude Trust, 2006)
