= Claudio Monteverdi =

Italian composer (1567–1643)

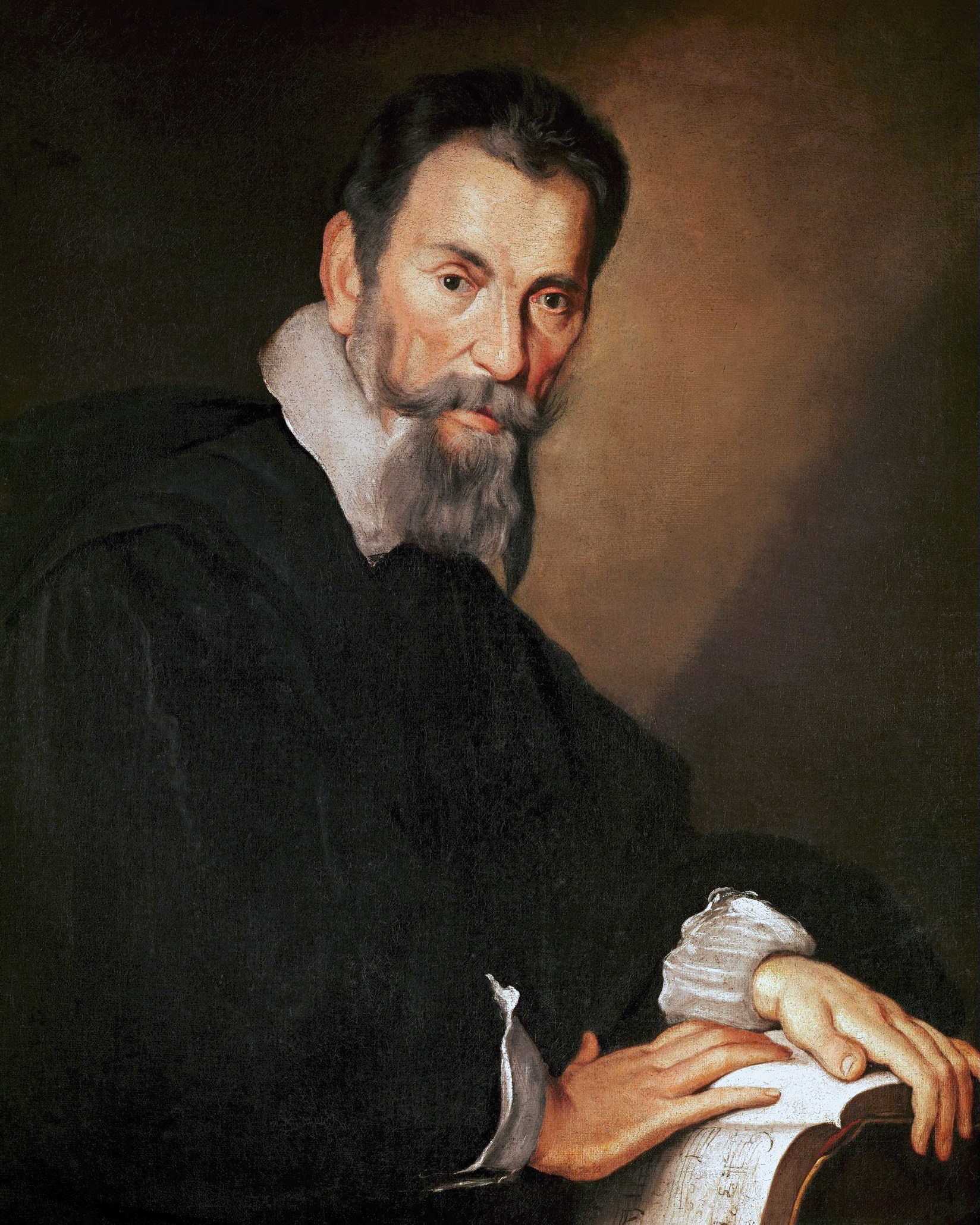
- Monteverdi in c. 1630
- Born: Cremona
- Baptized: 15 May 1567
- Died: 29 November 1643 (aged 76); Venice
- Occupations: Composer; Choirmaster; String player
- Works: List of compositions

Signature
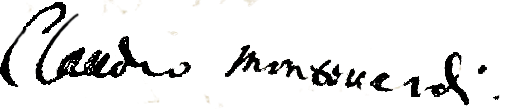

Claudio Giovanni Antonio Monteverdi (Note: Pronunciation: /ˌmɒntɪˈvɛərdi/ MON-tih-VAIR-dee, US also /-ˈvɜːrd-/ -VURD-; Italian: [ˈklaudjo monteˈverdi]. The spelling Monteuerde was also used during his lifetime.) (baptized 15 May 1567 – 29 November 1643) was an Italian composer, choirmaster and string player. A composer of both secular and sacred music, and a pioneer in the development of opera, he is considered a crucial transitional figure between the Renaissance and Baroque periods of music history.

Born in Cremona, where he undertook his first musical studies and compositions, Monteverdi developed his career first at the court of Mantua (c. 1590–1613) and then until his death in the Republic of Venice where he was maestro di cappella at the basilica of San Marco. His surviving letters give insight into the life of a professional musician in Italy of the period, including problems of income, patronage and politics.

Much of Monteverdi's output, including many stage works, has been lost. His surviving music includes nine books of madrigals, large-scale religious works, such as his Vespro della Beata Vergine (Vespers for the Blessed Virgin) of 1610, and three complete operas. His opera L'Orfeo (1607) is the earliest of the genre still widely performed; towards the end of his life he wrote works for Venice, including Il ritorno d'Ulisse in patria and L'incoronazione di Poppea.

While he worked extensively in the tradition of earlier Renaissance polyphony, as evidenced in his madrigals, he undertook great developments in form and melody, and began to employ the basso continuo technique, distinctive of the Baroque. No stranger to controversy, he defended his sometimes novel techniques as elements of a seconda pratica, contrasting with the more orthodox earlier style which he termed the prima pratica. Largely forgotten during the eighteenth and much of the nineteenth centuries, his works enjoyed a rediscovery around the beginning of the twentieth century. He is now established both as a significant influence in European musical history and as a composer whose works are regularly performed and recorded.

== Life ==
=== Cremona: 1567–1591 ===
Monteverdi was baptised in the church of SS Nazaro e Celso, Cremona, on 15 May 1567. The register records his name as "Claudio Zuan Antonio" the son of "Messer Baldasar Mondeverdo". He was the first child of the apothecary Baldassare Monteverdi and his first wife Maddalena (née Zignani); they had married early the previous year. Claudio's brother Giulio Cesare Monteverdi was also to become a musician; there were two other brothers and two sisters from Baldassare's marriage to Maddalena and his subsequent marriage in 1576 or 1577. Cremona was close to the border of the Republic of Venice, and not far from the lands controlled by the Duchy of Mantua, in both of which states Monteverdi was later to establish his career.

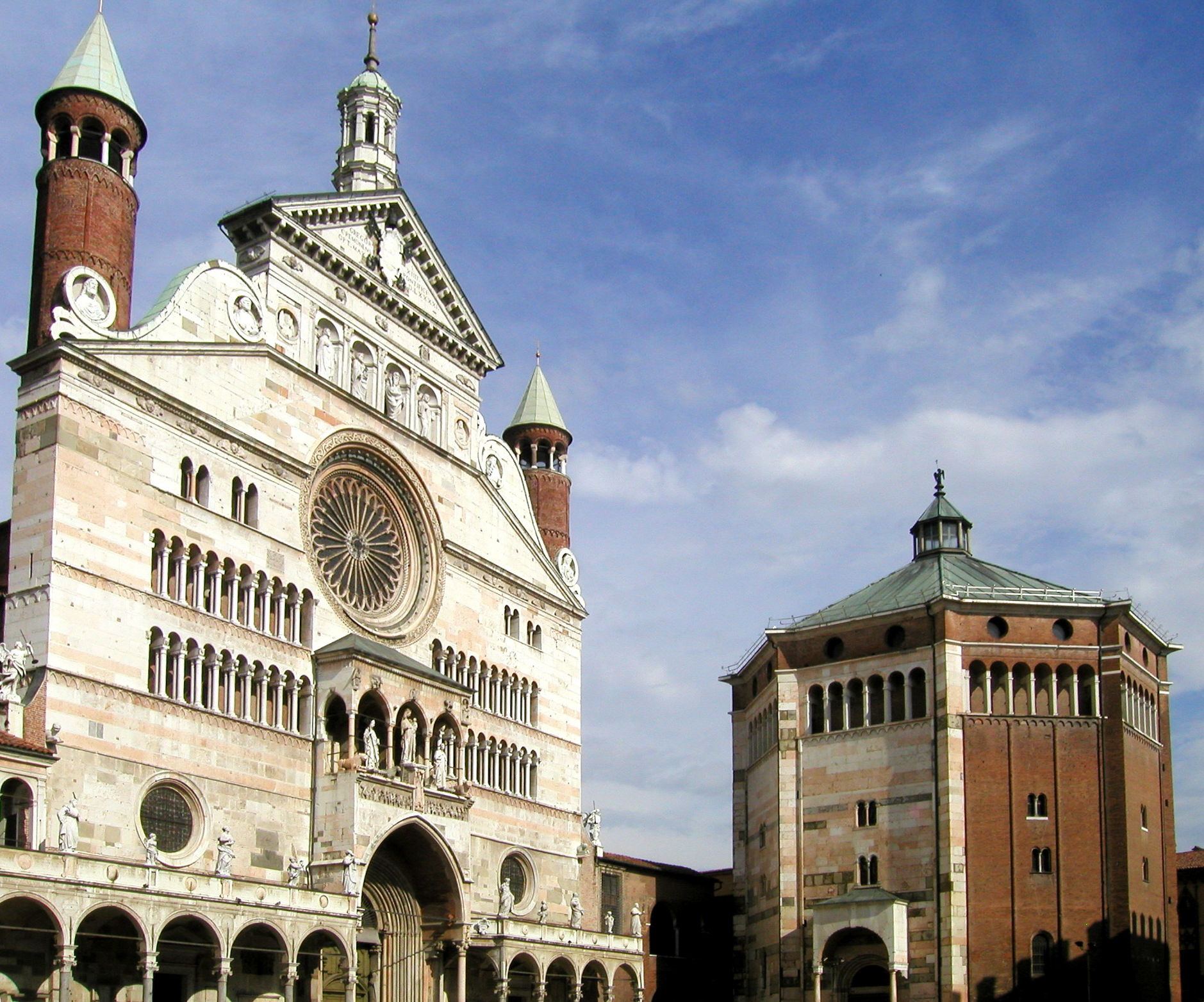
Cremona Cathedral, where Monteverdi's teacher Ingegneri was maestro di capella

There is no clear record of Monteverdi's early musical training, or evidence that (as is sometimes claimed) he was a member of the Cathedral choir or studied at Cremona University. Monteverdi's first published work, a set of motets, Sacrae cantiunculae (Sacred Little Songs) for three voices, was issued in Venice in 1582, when he was only fifteen years old. In this, and his other initial publications, he describes himself as the pupil of Marc'Antonio Ingegneri, who was from 1581 (and possibly from 1576) to 1592 the maestro di cappella at Cremona Cathedral. The musicologist Tim Carter deduces that Ingegneri "gave him a solid grounding in counterpoint and composition", and that Monteverdi would also have studied playing instruments of the viol family and singing.

Monteverdi's first publications also give evidence of his connections beyond Cremona, even in his early years. His second published work, Madrigali spirituali (Spiritual Madrigals, 1583), was printed at Brescia. His next works (his first published secular compositions) were sets of five-part madrigals, according to his biographer Paolo Fabbri: "the inevitable proving ground for any composer of the second half of the sixteenth century ... the secular genre par excellence". The first book of madrigals (1587) was dedicated to Count Marco Verità of Verona; the second book of madrigals (1590) was dedicated to the President of the Senate of Milan, Giacomo Ricardi, for whom he had played the viola da braccio in 1587.

=== Mantua: 1591–1613 ===
==== Court musician ====
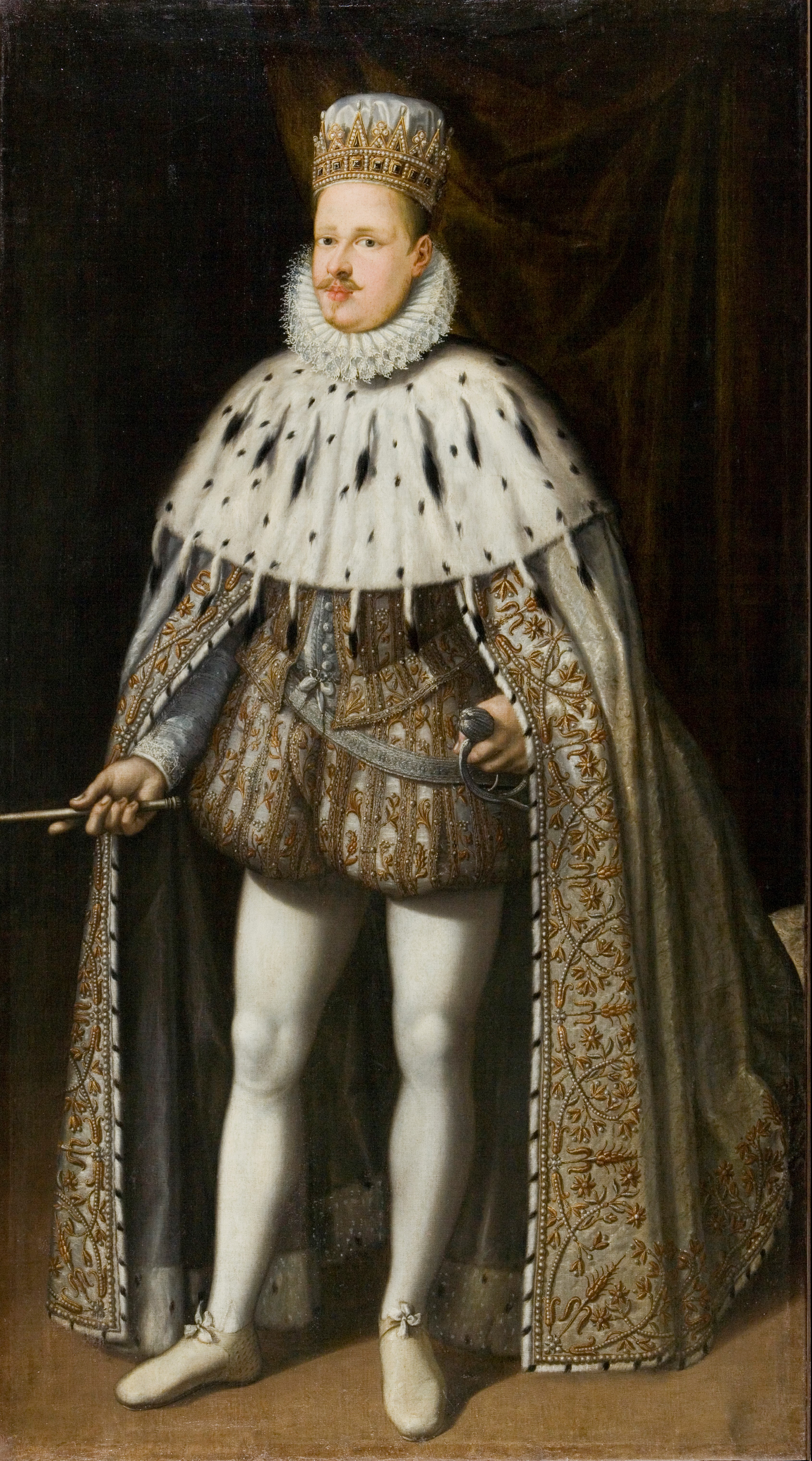
Duke Vincenzo I Gonzaga in his coronation robes (1587, by Jeannin Bahuet)

In the dedication of his second book of madrigals, Monteverdi had described himself as a player of the vivuola (which could mean either viola da gamba or viola da braccio). (Note: The viola da gamba (literally 'violin on the leg'), was held upright between the knees; the viola da braccio ('violin on the arm'), like the modern violin, was held beneath the chin.) In 1590 or 1591 he entered the service of Duke Vincenzo I Gonzaga of Mantua; he recalled in his dedication to the Duke of his third book of madrigals (Venice, 1592) that "the most noble exercise of the vivuola opened to me the fortunate way into your service." In the same dedication he compares his instrumental playing to "flowers" and his compositions as "fruit" which as it matures "can more worthily and more perfectly serve you", indicating his intentions to establish himself as a composer.

Duke Vincenzo was keen to establish his court as a musical centre, and sought to recruit leading musicians. When Monteverdi arrived in Mantua, the maestro di capella at the court was the Flemish musician Giaches de Wert. Other notable musicians at the court during this period included the composer and violinist Salomone Rossi, Rossi's sister, the singer Madama Europa, and Francesco Rasi. Monteverdi married the court singer Claudia de Cattaneis in 1599; they were to have three children, two sons (Francesco, b. 1601 and Massimiliano, b. 1604), and a daughter who died soon after birth in 1603. Monteverdi's brother Giulio Cesare joined the court musicians in 1602.

When Wert died in 1596, his post was given to Benedetto Pallavicino, but Monteverdi was clearly highly regarded by Vincenzo and accompanied him on his military campaigns in Hungary (1595) and also on a visit to Flanders in 1599. Here at the town of Spa he is reported by his brother Giulio Cesare as encountering, and bringing back to Italy, the canto alla francese. (The meaning of this, literally "song in the French style", is debatable, but may refer to the French-influenced poetry of Gabriello Chiabrera, some of which was set by Monteverdi in his Scherzi musicali, and which departs from the traditional Italian style of lines of 9 or 11 syllables). Monteverdi may possibly have been a member of Vincenzo's entourage at Florence in 1600 for the marriage of Maria de' Medici and Henry IV of France, at which celebrations Jacopo Peri's opera Euridice (the earliest surviving opera) was premiered. On the death of Pallavicino in 1601, Monteverdi was confirmed as the new maestro di capella.

==== Artusi controversy and seconda pratica ====
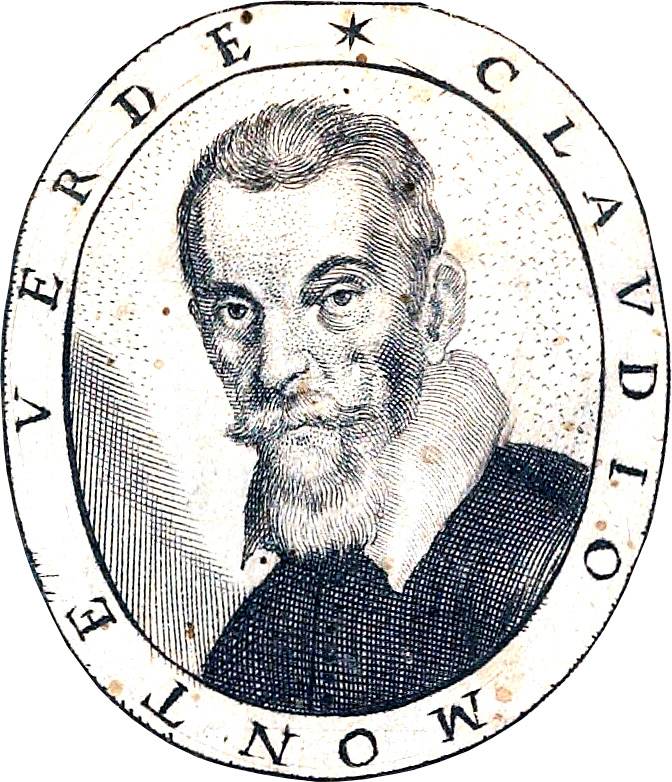
The only certain portrait of Claudio Monteverdi, from the title page of Fiori poetici, a 1644 book of commemorative poems for his funeral

At the turn of the 17th century, Monteverdi found himself the target of musical controversy. The influential Bolognese theorist Giovanni Maria Artusi attacked Monteverdi's music (without naming the composer) in his work L'Artusi, overo Delle imperfettioni della moderna musica (Artusi, or On the imperfections of modern music) of 1600, followed by a sequel in 1603. Artusi cited extracts from Monteverdi's works not yet published (they later formed parts of his fourth and fifth books of madrigals of 1603 and 1605), condemning their use of harmony and their innovations in use of musical modes, compared to orthodox polyphonic practice of the sixteenth century. Artusi attempted to correspond with Monteverdi on these issues; the composer refused to respond, but found a champion in a pseudonymous supporter, "L'Ottuso Academico" ("The Obtuse Academic"). Eventually Monteverdi replied in the preface to the fifth book of madrigals that his duties at court prevented him from a detailed reply; but in a note to "the studious reader", he claimed that he would shortly publish a response, Seconda Pratica, overo Perfettione della Moderna Musica (The Second Style, or Perfection of Modern Music). This work never appeared, but a later publication by Claudio's brother Giulio Cesare made it clear that the seconda pratica which Monteverdi defended was not seen by him as a radical change or his own invention, but was an evolution from previous styles (prima pratica) which was complementary to them.

This debate seems in any case to have raised the composer's profile, leading to reprints of his earlier books of madrigals. Some of his madrigals were published in Copenhagen in 1605 and 1606, and the poet Tommaso Stigliani (1573–1651) published a eulogy of him in his 1605 poem "O sirene de' fiumi". The composer of madrigal comedies and theorist Adriano Banchieri wrote in 1609: "I must not neglect to mention the most noble of composers, Monteverdi ... his expressive qualities are truly deserving of the highest commendation, and we find in them countless examples of matchless declamation ... enhanced by comparable harmonies." The modern music historian Massimo Ossi has placed the Artusi issue in the context of Monteverdi's artistic development: "If the controversy seems to define Monteverdi's historical position, it also seems to have been about stylistic developments that by 1600 Monteverdi had already outgrown".

The non-appearance of Monteverdi's promised explanatory treatise may have been a deliberate ploy, since by 1608, by Monteverdi's reckoning, Artusi had become fully reconciled to modern trends in music, and the seconda pratica was by then well established; Monteverdi had no need to revisit the issue. On the other hand, letters to Giovanni Battista Doni of 1632 show that Monteverdi was still preparing a defence of the seconda pratica, in a treatise entitled Melodia; he may still have been working on this at the time of his death ten years later.

==== Opera, conflict and departure ====
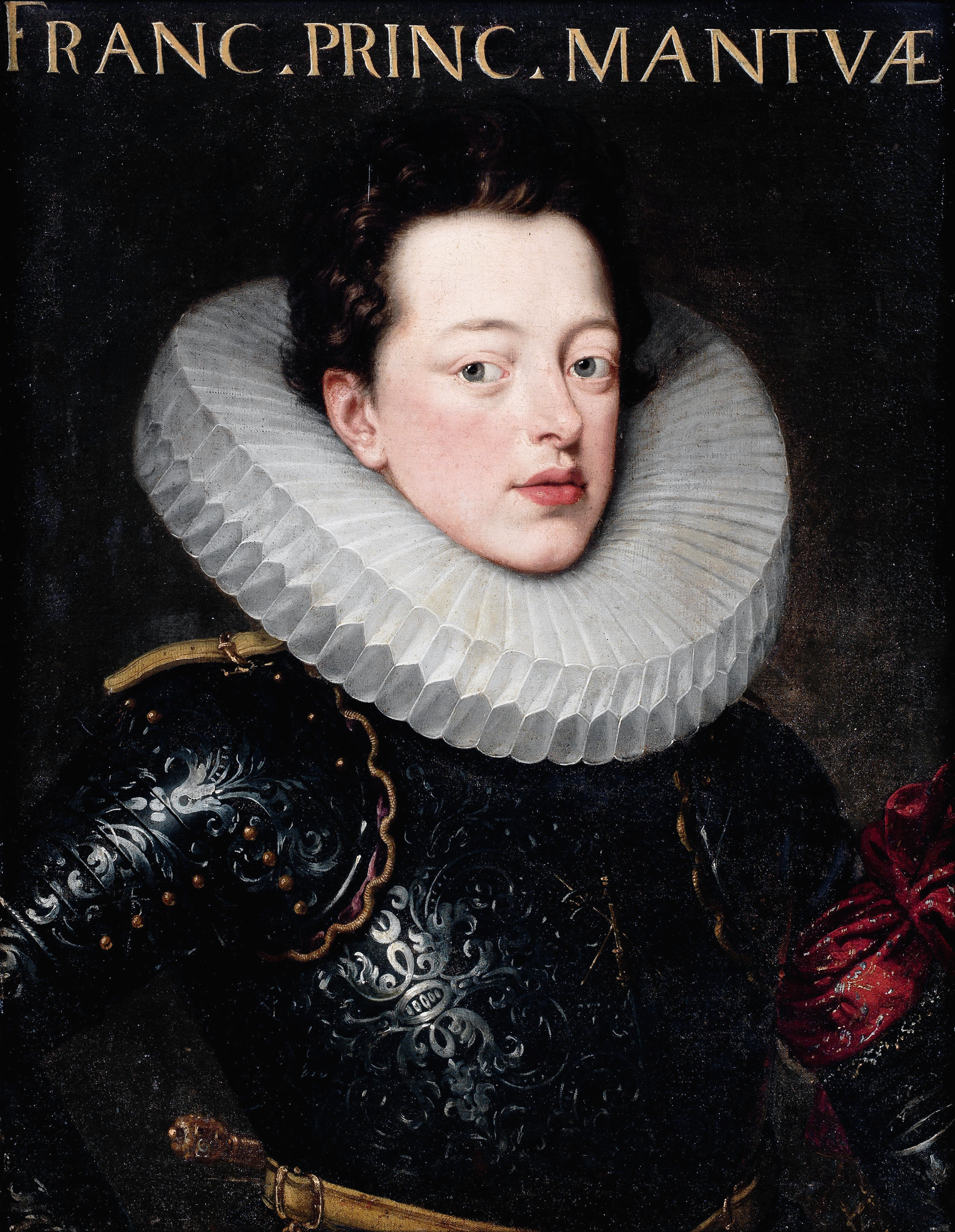
Duke Francesco IV Gonzaga, by the studio of Frans Pourbus the Younger

In 1606, Vincenzo's heir Francesco commissioned from Monteverdi the opera L'Orfeo, to a libretto by Alessandro Striggio, for the Carnival season of 1607. It was given two performances in February and March 1607; the singers included, in the title role, Rasi, who had sung in the first performance of Euridice witnessed by Vincenzo in 1600. This was followed in 1608 by the opera L'Arianna (libretto by Ottavio Rinuccini), intended for the celebration of the marriage of Francesco to Margherita of Savoy. All the music for this opera is lost apart from Ariadne's Lament, which became extremely popular. (Note: As late as 1932, the composer Francesco Malipiero commented that of all Monteverdi's works, "only Ariadne's Lament has prevented us from completely forgetting the most famous composer of the seventeenth century.") To this period also belongs the ballet entertainment Il ballo delle ingrate.

The strain of the hard work Monteverdi had been putting into these and other compositions was exacerbated by personal tragedies. His wife died in September 1607 and the young singer Caterina Martinelli, intended for the title role of Arianna, died of smallpox in March 1608. Monteverdi also resented his increasingly poor financial treatment by the Gonzagas. He retired to Cremona in 1608 to convalesce, and wrote a bitter letter to Vincenzo's minister Annibale Chieppio in November of that year seeking (unsuccessfully) "an honourable dismissal". Although the Duke increased Monteverdi's salary and pension, and Monteverdi returned to continue his work at the court, he began to seek patronage elsewhere. After publishing his Vespers in 1610, which were dedicated to Pope Paul V, he visited Rome, ostensibly hoping to place his son Francesco at a seminary, but apparently also seeking alternative employment. In the same year he may also have visited Venice, where a large collection of his church music was being printed, with a similar intention.

Duke Vincenzo died on 18 February 1612. When Francesco succeeded him, court intrigues and cost-cutting led to the dismissal of Monteverdi and his brother Giulio Cesare, who both returned, almost penniless, to Cremona. Despite Francesco's own death from smallpox in December 1612, Monteverdi was unable to return to favour with his successor, his brother Cardinal Ferdinando Gonzaga. In 1613, following the death of Giulio Cesare Martinengo, Monteverdi auditioned for his post as maestro at the basilica of San Marco in Venice, for which he submitted music for a Mass. He was appointed in August 1613, and given 50 ducats for his expenses (of which he was robbed, together with his other belongings, by highwaymen at Sanguinetto on his return to Cremona).

=== Venice: 1613–1643 ===
==== Maturity: 1613–1630 ====
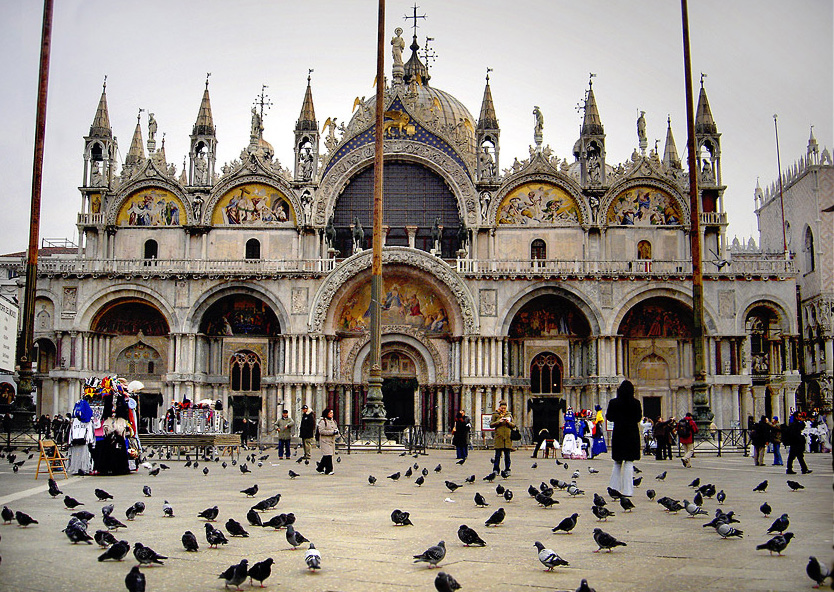
The basilica of San Marco, Venice

Martinengo had been ill for some time before his death and had left the music of San Marco in a fragile state. The choir had been neglected and the administration overlooked. When Monteverdi arrived to take up his post, his principal responsibility was to recruit, train, discipline and manage the musicians of San Marco (the capella), who amounted to about 30 singers and six instrumentalists; the numbers could be increased for major events. Among the recruits to the choir was Francesco Cavalli, who joined in 1616 at the age of 14; he remained connected with San Marco throughout his life, and developed a close association with Monteverdi. Monteverdi also sought to expand the repertory, including not only the traditional a cappella repertoire of Roman and Flemish composers, but also examples of the modern style which he favoured, including the use of continuo and other instruments. Apart from this he was of course expected to compose music for all the major feasts of the church. This included a new mass each year for Holy Cross Day and Christmas Eve, cantatas in honour of the Venetian Doge, and numerous other works (many of which are lost). Monteverdi was also free to obtain income by providing music for other Venetian churches and for other patrons, and was frequently commissioned to provide music for state banquets. The Procurators of San Marco, to whom Monteverdi was directly responsible, showed their satisfaction with his work in 1616 by raising his annual salary from 300 ducats to 400.

The relative freedom which the Republic of Venice afforded him, compared to the problems of court politics in Mantua, are reflected in Monteverdi's letters to Striggio, particularly his letter of 13 March 1620, when he rejects an invitation to return to Mantua, extolling his present position and finances in Venice, and referring to the pension which Mantua still owes him. Nonetheless, remaining a Mantuan citizen, he accepted commissions from the new Duke Ferdinando, who had formally renounced his position as Cardinal in 1616 to take on the duties of state. These included the balli Tirsi e Clori (1616) and Apollo (1620), an opera Andromeda (1620) and an intermedio, Le nozze di Tetide, for the marriage of Ferdinando with Caterina de' Medici (1617). Most of these compositions were extensively delayed in creation – partly, as shown by surviving correspondence, through the composer's unwillingness to prioritise them, and partly because of constant changes in the court's requirements. (Note: Monteverdi's letters provide a detailed account of the various procrastinations and delays.) They are now lost, apart from Tirsi e Clori, which was included in the seventh book of madrigals (published 1619) and dedicated to the Duchess Caterina, for which the composer received a pearl necklace from the Duchess. A subsequent major commission, the opera La finta pazza Licori, to a libretto by Giulio Strozzi, was completed for Fernando's successor Vincenzo II, who succeeded to the dukedom in 1626. Because of the latter's illness (he died in 1627), it was never performed, and it is now also lost.

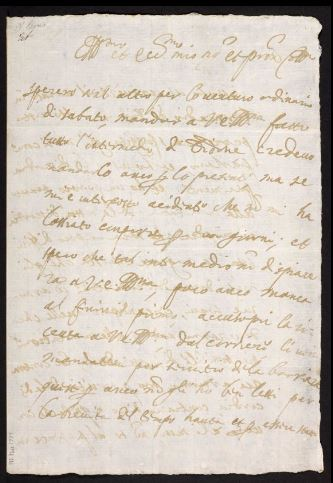
Letter from Monteverdi to Enzo Bentivoglio in Ferrara, 18 September 1627, (British Library, MS Mus. 1707), discussing the composer's intermezzo, Didone ed Enea

Monteverdi also received commissions from other Italian states and from their communities in Venice. These included, for the Milanese community in 1620, music for the Feast of St. Charles Borromeo, and for the Florentine community a Requiem Mass for Cosimo II de' Medici (1621). Monteverdi acted on behalf of Paolo Giordano II, Duke of Bracciano, to arrange publication of works by the Cremona musician Francesco Petratti. Among Monteverdi's private Venetian patrons was the nobleman Girolamo Mocenigo, at whose home was premiered in 1624 the dramatic entertainment Il combattimento di Tancredi e Clorinda based on an episode from Torquato Tasso's La Gerusalemme liberata. In 1627 Monteverdi received a major commission from Odoardo Farnese, Duke of Parma, for a series of works, and gained leave from the Procurators to spend time there during 1627 and 1628.

Monteverdi's musical direction received the attention of foreign visitors. The Dutch diplomat and musician Constantijn Huygens, attending a Vespers service at the church of SS. Giovanni e Lucia, wrote that he "heard the most perfect music I had ever heard in my life. It was directed by the most famous Claudio Monteverdi ... who was also the composer and was accompanied by four theorbos, two cornettos, two bassoons, one basso de viola of huge size, organs and other instruments ...". Monteverdi wrote a mass, and provided other musical entertainment, for the visit to Venice in 1625 of the Crown Prince Władysław of Poland, who may have sought to revive attempts made a few years previously to lure Monteverdi to Warsaw. He also provided chamber music for Wolfgang Wilhelm, Count Palatine of Neuburg, when the latter was paying an incognito visit to Venice in July 1625.

Correspondence of Monteverdi in 1625 and 1626 with the Mantuan courtier Ercole Marigliani reveals an interest in alchemy, which apparently Monteverdi had taken up as a hobby. He discusses experiments to transform lead into gold, the problems of obtaining mercury, and mentions commissioning special vessels for his experiments from the glassworks at Murano.

Despite his generally satisfactory situation in Venice, Monteverdi experienced personal problems from time to time. He was on one occasion – probably because of his wide network of contacts – the subject of an anonymous denunciation to the Venetian authorities alleging that he supported the Habsburgs. He was also subject to anxieties about his children. His son Francesco, while a student of law at Padua in 1619, was spending in Monteverdi's opinion too much time with music, and he, therefore, moved him to the University of Bologna. This change did not have the desired result, and it seems that Monteverdi resigned himself to Francesco having a musical career – he joined the choir of San Marco in 1623. His other son Massimiliano, who graduated in medicine, was arrested by the Inquisition in Mantua in 1627 for reading forbidden literature. Monteverdi was obliged to sell the necklace he had received from Duchess Caterina to pay for his son's (eventually successful) defence. Monteverdi wrote at the time to Striggio seeking his help, and fearing that Massimiliano might be subject to torture; it seems that Striggio's intervention was helpful. Money worries at this time also led Monteverdi to visit Cremona to secure for himself a church canonry.

==== Pause and priesthood: 1630–1637 ====
A series of disturbing events troubled Monteverdi's world in the period around 1630. Mantua was invaded by Habsburg armies in 1630, who besieged the plague-stricken town, and after its fall in July looted its treasures, and dispersed the artistic community. The plague was carried to Mantua's ally Venice by an embassy led by Monteverdi's confidante Striggio, and over a period of 16 months led to over 45,000 deaths, leaving Venice's population in 1633 at just above 100,000, the lowest level for about 150 years. Among the plague victims was Monteverdi's assistant at San Marco, and a notable composer in his own right, Alessandro Grandi. The plague and the after-effects of war had an inevitable deleterious effect on the economy and artistic life of Venice. Monteverdi's younger brother Giulio Cesare also died at this time, probably from the plague.

By this time Monteverdi was in his sixties, and his rate of composition seems to have slowed down. He had written a setting of Strozzi's Proserpina rapita (The Abduction of Proserpina), now lost except for one vocal trio, for a Mocenigo wedding in 1630, and produced a Mass for deliverance from the plague for San Marco which was performed in November 1631. His set of Scherzi musicali was published in Venice in 1632. In 1631, Monteverdi was admitted to the tonsure, and was ordained deacon, and later priest, in 1632. Although these ceremonies took place in Venice, he was nominated as a member of Diocese of Cremona; this may imply that he intended to retire there.

==== Late flowering: 1637–1643 ====
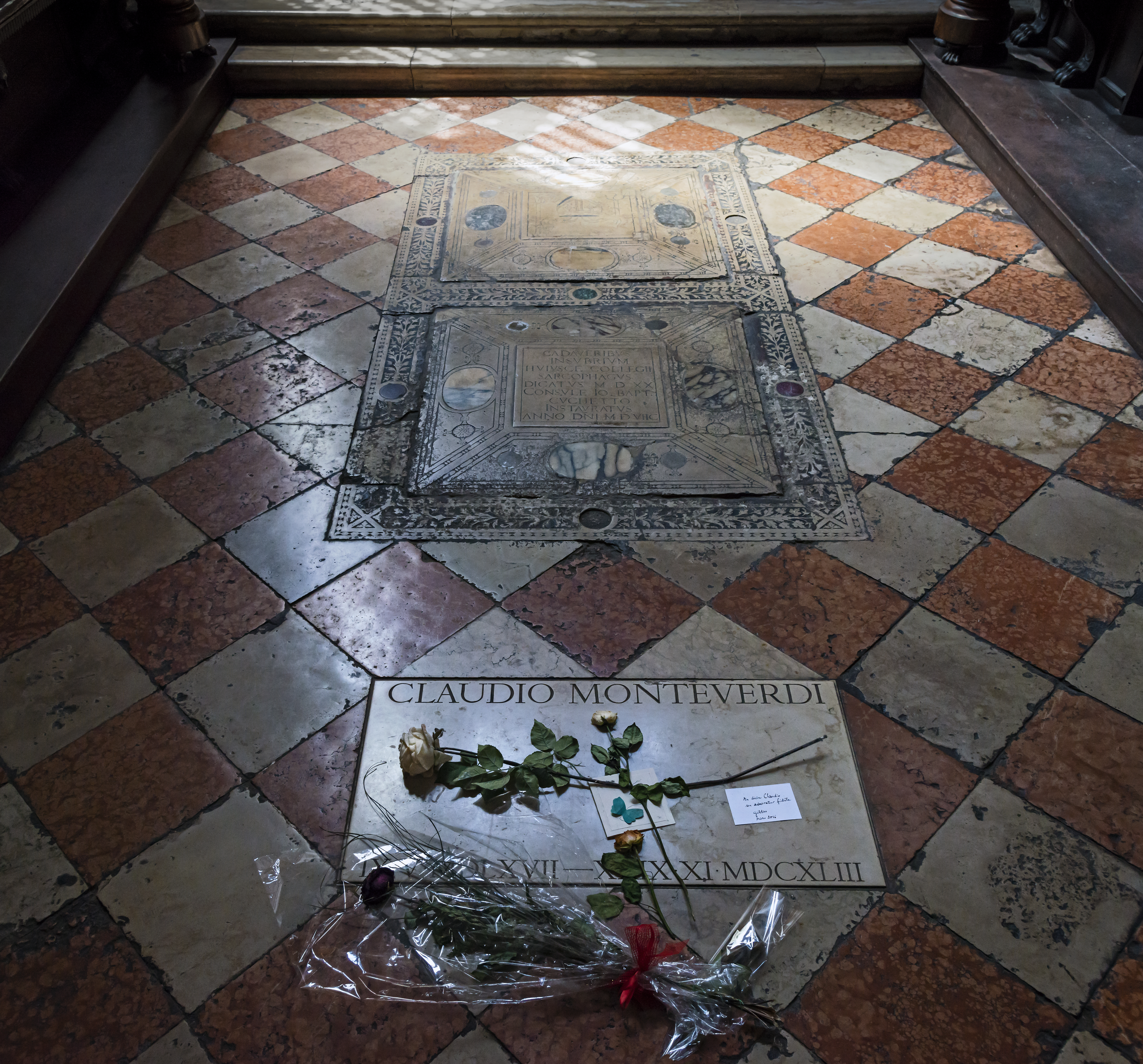
Monteverdi's tomb in the church of Santa Maria Gloriosa dei Frari

The opening of the opera house of San Cassiano in 1637, the first public opera house in Europe, stimulated the city's musical life and coincided with a new burst of the composer's activity. The year 1638 saw the publication of Monteverdi's eighth book of madrigals and a revision of the Ballo delle ingrate. The eighth book contains a ballo, "Volgendi il ciel", which may have been composed for the Holy Roman Emperor, Ferdinand III, to whom the book is dedicated. The years 1640–1641 saw the publication of the extensive collection of church music, Selva morale e spirituale. Among other commissions, Monteverdi wrote music in 1637 and 1638 for Strozzi's "Accademia degli Unisoni" in Venice, and in 1641 a ballet, La vittoria d'Amore, for the court of Piacenza.

Monteverdi was still not entirely free from his responsibilities for the musicians at San Marco. He wrote to complain about one of his singers to the Procurators, on 9 June 1637: "I, Claudio Monteverdi ... come humbly ... to set forth to you how Domenicato Aldegati ... a bass, yesterday morning ... at the time of the greatest concourse of people ... spoke these exact words ...'The Director of Music comes from a brood of cut-throat bastards, a thieving, fucking, he-goat ... and I shit on him and whoever protects him ...'". (Note: Denis Stevens notes, in his edition of Monteverdi's letters: "Strange that these words, once unfairly applied to the composer, might now be used with some justification to describe the more unruly among his interpreters.")

Monteverdi's contribution to opera at this period is notable. He revised his earlier opera L'Arianna in 1640 and wrote three new works for the commercial stage, Il ritorno d'Ulisse in patria (The Return of Ulysses to his Homeland, 1640, first performed in Bologna with Venetian singers), Le nozze d'Enea e Lavinia (The Marriage of Aeneas and Lavinia, 1641, music now lost), and L'incoronazione di Poppea (The Coronation of Poppea, 1643). The introduction to the printed scenario of Le nozze d'Enea, by an unknown author, acknowledges that Monteverdi is to be credited for the rebirth of theatrical music and that "he will be sighed for in later ages, for his compositions will surely outlive the ravages of time."

In his last surviving letter (20 August 1643), Monteverdi, already ill, was still hoping for the settlement of the long-disputed pension from Mantua, and asked the Doge of Venice to intervene on his behalf. He died in Venice on 29 November 1643, after paying a brief visit to Cremona, and is buried in the Church of the Frari. He was survived by his sons; Masimilliano died in 1661, Francesco after 1677.

== Music ==
=== Background: Renaissance to Baroque ===
Musicians of the late Renaissance/early Baroque era (Gerard van Honthorst, The Concert, 1623)

There is a consensus among music historians that a period extending from the mid-15th century to around 1625, characterised in Lewis Lockwood's phrase by "substantial unity of outlook and language", should be identified as the period of "Renaissance music". Musical literature has also defined the succeeding period (covering music from approximately 1580 to 1750) as the era of "Baroque music". It is in the late-16th to early-17th-century overlap of these periods that much of Monteverdi's creativity flourished; he stands as a transitional figure between the Renaissance and the Baroque.

In the Renaissance era, music had developed as a formal discipline, a "pure science of relationships" in the words of Lockwood. In the Baroque era it became a form of aesthetic expression, increasingly used to adorn religious, social and festive celebrations in which, in accordance with Plato's ideal, the music was subordinated to the text. Solo singing with instrumental accompaniment, or monody, acquired greater significance towards the end of the 16th century, replacing polyphony as the principal means of dramatic music expression. This was the changing world in which Monteverdi was active. Percy Scholes in his Oxford Companion to Music describes the "new music" thus: "[Composers] discarded the choral polyphony of the madrigal style as barbaric, and set dialogue or soliloquy for single voices, imitating more or less the inflexions of speech and accompanying the voice by playing mere supporting chords. Short choruses were interspersed, but they too were homophonic rather than polyphonic."

=== Novice years: Madrigal books 1 and 2 ===
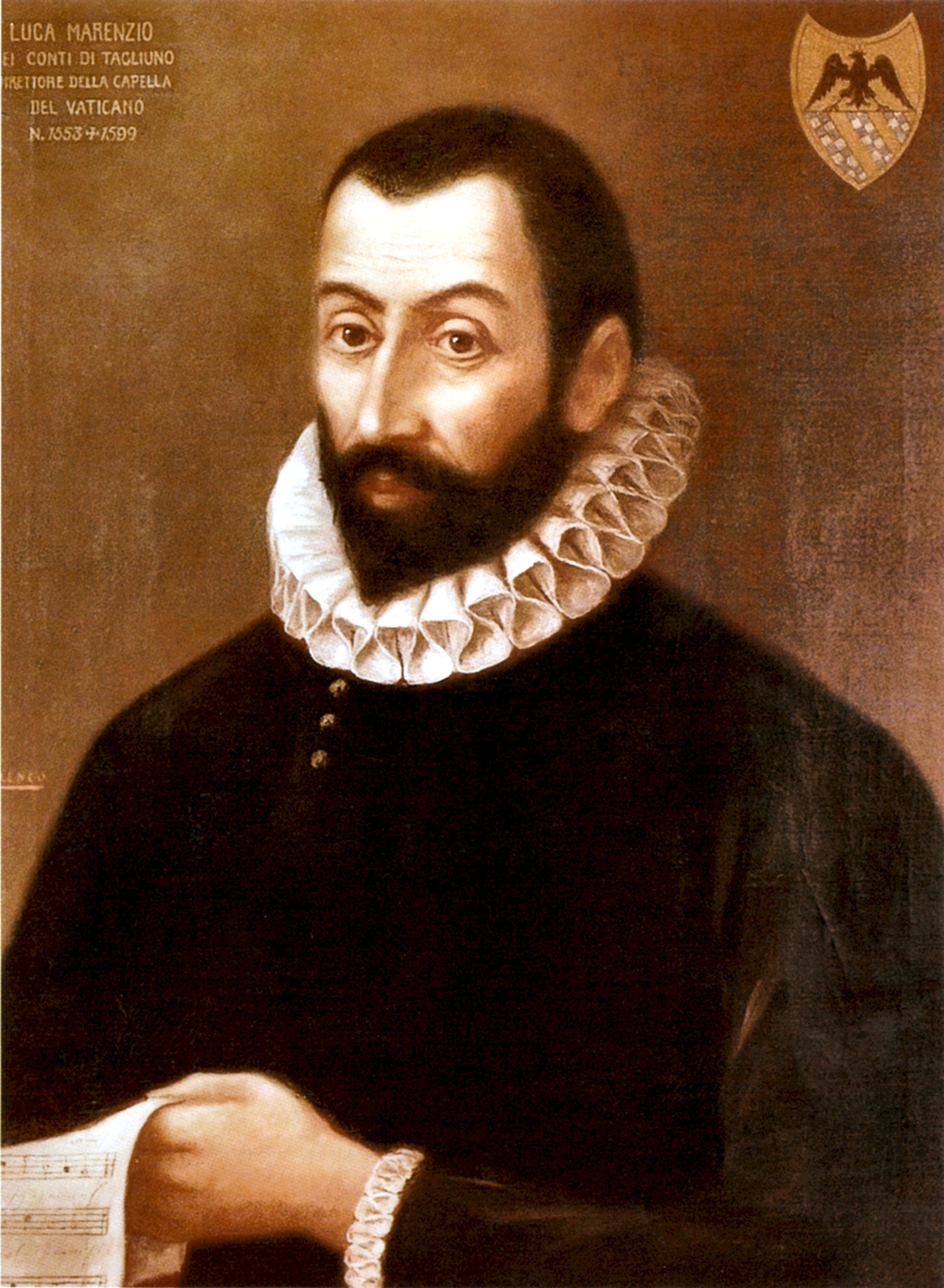
Luca Marenzio, an early influence on Monteverdi

Marc'Antonio Ingegneri, Monteverdi's first tutor, was a master of the musica reservata vocal style, which involved the use of chromatic progressions and word-painting; Monteverdi's early compositions were grounded in this style. Ingegneri was a traditional Renaissance composer, "something of an anachronism", according to Arnold, but Monteverdi also studied the work of more "modern" composers such as Luca Marenzio, Luzzasco Luzzaschi, and a little later, Giaches de Wert, from whom he would learn the art of expressing passion. He was a precocious and productive student, as indicated by his youthful publications of 1582–83. Mark Ringer writes that "these teenaged efforts reveal palpable ambition matched with a convincing mastery of contemporary style", but at this stage they display their creator's competence rather than any striking originality. Geoffrey Chew classifies them as "not in the most modern vein for the period", acceptable but out-of-date. Chew rates the Canzonette collection of 1584 much more highly than the earlier juvenilia: "These brief three-voice pieces draw on the airy, modern style of the villanellas of Marenzio, [drawing on] a substantial vocabulary of text-related madrigalisms".

The canzonetta form was much used by composers of the day as a technical exercise, and is a prominent element in Monteverdi's first book of madrigals published in 1587. In this book, the playful, pastoral settings again reflect the style of Marenzio, while Luzzaschi's influence is evident in Monteverdi's use of dissonance. The second book (1590) begins with a setting modelled on Marenzio of a modern verse, Torquato Tasso's "Non si levav' ancor", and concludes with a text from 50 years earlier: Pietro Bembo's "Cantai un tempo". Monteverdi set the latter to music in an archaic style reminiscent of the long-dead Cipriano de Rore. Between them is "Ecco mormorar l'onde", strongly influenced by de Wert and hailed by Chew as the great masterpiece of the second book.

A thread common throughout these early works is Monteverdi's use of the technique of imitatio, a general practice among composers of the period whereby material from earlier or contemporary composers was used as models for their own work. Monteverdi continued to use this procedure well beyond his apprentice years, a factor that in some critics' eyes has compromised his reputation for originality.

=== Madrigals 1590–1605: books 3, 4, 5 ===
Monteverdi's first fifteen years of service in Mantua are bracketed by his publications of the third book of madrigals in 1592 and the fourth and fifth books in 1603 and 1605. Between 1592 and 1603 he made minor contributions to other anthologies. How much he composed in this period is a matter of conjecture; his many duties in the Mantuan court may have limited his opportunities, but several of the madrigals that he published in the fourth and fifth books were written and performed during the 1590s, some figuring prominently in the Artusi controversy.

Madrigal: "Non si levav'ancor" from second book, pub. 1590

Madrigal: "Cor mio mentre vi miro" from fourth book, pub. 1603

The third book shows strongly the increased influence of Wert, by that time Monteverdi's direct superior as maestro de capella at Mantua. Two poets dominate the collection: Tasso, whose lyrical poetry had figured prominently in the second book but is here represented through the more epic, heroic verses from Gerusalemme liberata, and Giovanni Battista Guarini, whose verses had appeared sporadically in Monteverdi's earlier publications, but form around half of the contents of the third book. Wert's influence is reflected in Monteverdi's forthrightly modern approach, and his expressive and chromatic settings of Tasso's verses. Of the Guarini settings, Chew writes: "The epigrammatic style ... closely matches a poetic and musical ideal of the period ... [and] often depends on strong, final cadential progressions, with or without the intensification provided by chains of suspended dissonances". Chew cites the setting of "Stracciami pur il core" as "a prime example of Monteverdi's irregular dissonance practice". Tasso and Guarini were both regular visitors to the Mantuan court; Monteverdi's association with them and his absorption of their ideas may have helped lay the foundations of his own approach to the musical dramas that he would create a decade later.

As the 1590s progressed, Monteverdi moved closer towards the form that he would identify in due course as the seconda pratica. Claude V. Palisca quotes the madrigal Ohimè, se tanto amate, published in the fourth book but written before 1600 – it is among the works attacked by Artusi – as a typical example of the composer's developing powers of invention. In this madrigal Monteverdi again departs from the established practice in the use of dissonance, by means of a vocal ornament Palisca describes as échappé. Monteverdi's daring use of this device is, says Palisca, "like a forbidden pleasure". In this and in other settings the poet's images were supreme, even at the expense of musical consistency.

The fourth book includes madrigals to which Artusi objected on the grounds of their "modernism". However, Ossi describes it as "an anthology of disparate works firmly rooted in the 16th century", closer in nature to the third book than to the fifth. Besides Tasso and Guarini, Monteverdi set to music verses by Rinuccini, Maurizio Moro (Sì ch'io vorrei morire) and Ridolfo Arlotti (Luci serene e chiare). There is evidence of the composer's familiarity with the works of Carlo Gesualdo, and with composers of the school of Ferrara such as Luzzaschi; the book was dedicated to a Ferrarese musical society, the Accademici Intrepidi.

The fifth book looks more to the future; for example, Monteverdi employs the stile concertato with basso continuo (a device that was to become a typical feature in the emergent Baroque era), and includes a sinfonia (instrumental interlude) in the final piece. He presents his music through complex counterpoint and daring harmonies, although at times combining the expressive possibilities of the new music with traditional polyphony.

Aquilino Coppini drew much of the music for his sacred contrafacta of 1608 from Monteverdi's 3rd, 4th and 5th books of madrigals. In writing to a friend in 1609 Coppini commented that Monteverdi's pieces "require, during their performance, more flexible rests and bars that are not strictly regular, now pressing forward or abandoning themselves to slowing down [...] In them there is a truly wondrous capacity for moving the affections".

=== Opera and sacred music: 1607–1612 ===
In Monteverdi's final five years' service in Mantua he completed the operas L'Orfeo (1607) and L'Arianna (1608), and wrote quantities of sacred music, including the Messa in illo tempore (1610) and also the collection known as Vespro della Beata Vergine which is often referred to as "Monteverdi's Vespers" (1610). He also published Scherzi musicale a tre voci (1607), settings of verses composed since 1599 and dedicated to the Gonzaga heir, Francesco. The vocal trio in the Scherzi comprises two sopranos and a bass, accompanied by simple instrumental ritornellos. According to Bowers the music "reflected the modesty of the prince's resources; it was, nevertheless, the earliest publication to associate voices and instruments in this particular way".

==== L'Orfeo ====
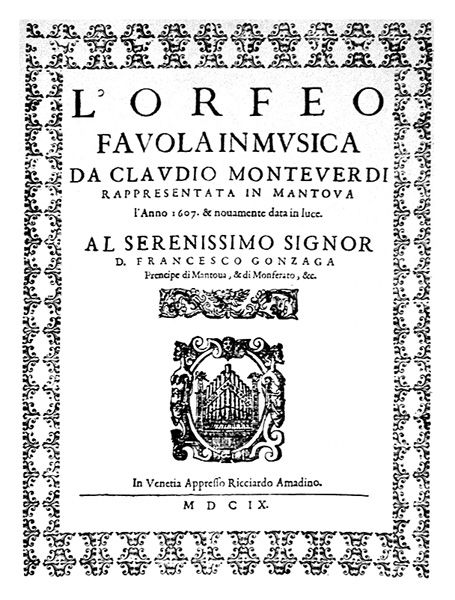
Frontispiece of Monteverdi's opera L'Orfeo, Venice edition, 1609.

The opera opens with a brief trumpet toccata. The prologue of La musica (a figure representing music) is introduced with a ritornello by the strings, repeated often to represent the "power of music" – one of the earliest examples of an operatic leitmotif. Act 1 presents a pastoral idyll, the buoyant mood of which continues into Act 2. The confusion and grief which follow the news of Euridice's death are musically reflected by harsh dissonances and the juxtaposition of keys. The music remains in this vein until the act ends with the consoling sounds of the ritornello.

Act 3 is dominated by Orfeo's aria "Possente spirto e formidabil nume" by which he attempts to persuade Caronte to allow him to enter Hades. Monteverdi's vocal embellishments and virtuoso accompaniment provide what Tim Carter has described as "one of the most compelling visual and aural representations" in early opera. In Act 4 the warmth of Proserpina's singing on behalf of Orfeo is retained until Orfeo fatally "looks back". The brief final act, which sees Orfeo's rescue and metamorphosis, is framed by the final appearance of the ritornello and by a lively moresca that brings the audience back to their everyday world.

Throughout the opera Monteverdi makes innovative use of polyphony, extending the rules beyond the conventions which composers normally observed in fidelity to Palestrina. He combines elements of the traditional 16th-century madrigal with the new monodic style where the text dominates the music and sinfonias and instrumental ritornellos illustrate the action.

==== L'Arianna ====
The music for this opera is lost except for the Lamento d'Arianna, which was published in the sixth book in 1614 as a five-voice madrigal; a separate monodic version was published in 1623. In its operatic context the lament depicts Arianna's various emotional reactions to her abandonment: sorrow, anger, fear, self-pity, desolation and a sense of futility. Throughout, indignation and anger are punctuated by tenderness, until a descending line brings the piece to a quiet conclusion.

The musicologist Suzanne Cusick writes that Monteverdi "creat[ed] the lament as a recognizable genre of vocal chamber music and as a standard scene in opera ... that would become crucial, almost genre-defining, to the full-scale public operas of 17th-century Venice". Cusick observes how Monteverdi is able to match in music the "rhetorical and syntactical gestures" in the text of Ottavio Rinuccini. The opening repeated words "Lasciatemi morire" (Let me die) are accompanied by a dominant seventh chord which Ringer describes as "an unforgettable chromatic stab of pain". Ringer suggests that the lament defines Monteverdi's innovative creativity in a manner similar to that in which the Prelude and the Liebestod in Tristan und Isolde announced Wagner's discovery of new expressive frontiers.

Rinuccini's full libretto, which has survived, was set in modern times by Alexander Goehr (Arianna, 1995), including a version of Monteverdi's Lament.

==== Vespers ====
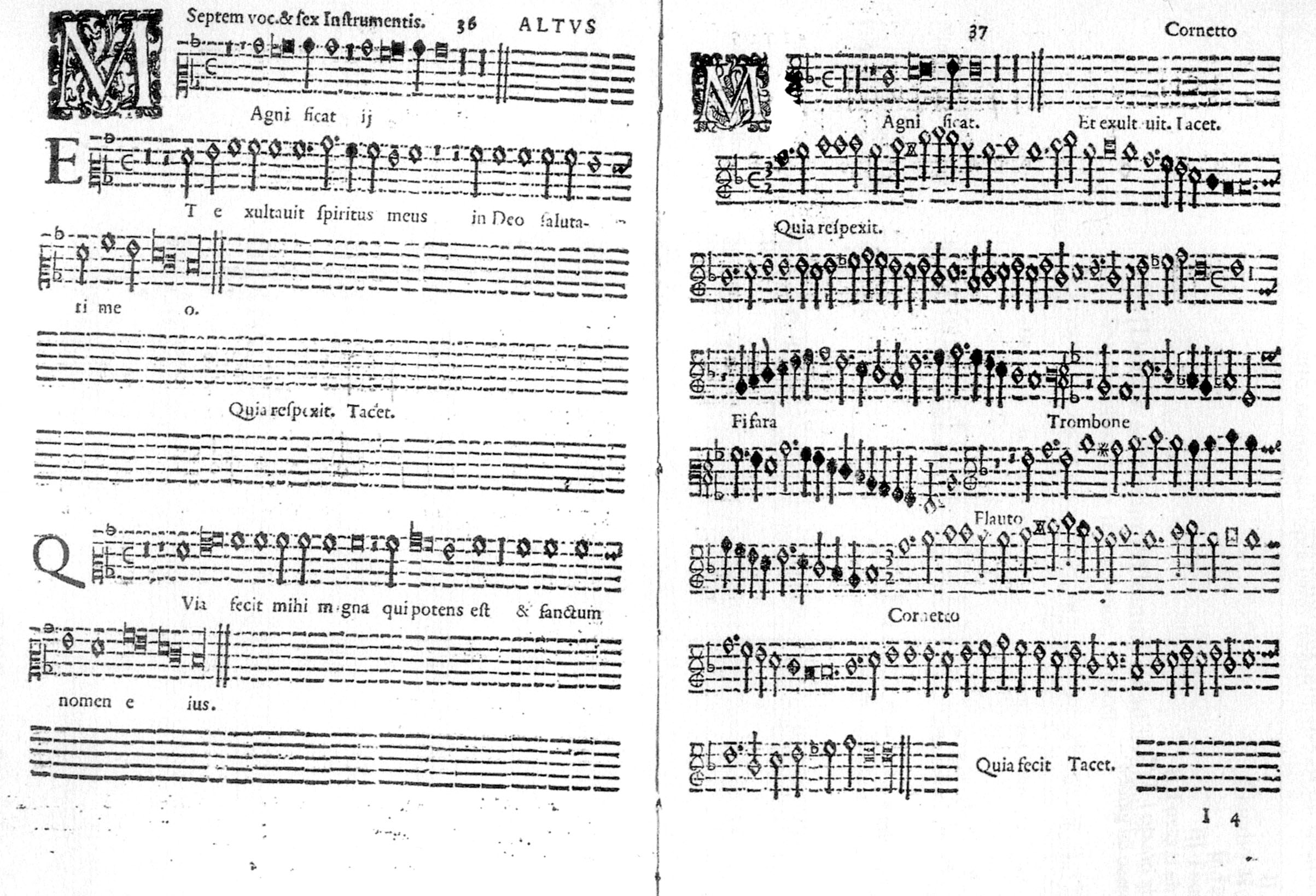
Pages from the printed Magnificat of the Vespers, a page from the alto partbook (left), and the corresponding page from the continuo partbook (right)

From Vespro della Beata Vergine
"Deus in adiutorium"

"Laudate pueri"

The Vespro della Beata Vergine, Monteverdi's first published sacred music since the Madrigali spirituali of 1583, consists of 14 components: an introductory versicle and response, five psalms interspersed with five "sacred concertos" (Monteverdi's term), a hymn, and two Magnificat settings. Collectively these pieces fulfil the requirements for a Vespers service on any feast day of the Virgin. Monteverdi employs many musical styles; the more traditional features, such as cantus firmus, falsobordone and Venetian canzone, are mixed with the latest madrigal style, including echo effects and chains of dissonances. Some of the musical features used are reminiscent of L'Orfeo, written slightly earlier for similar instrumental and vocal forces.

In this work the "sacred concertos" fulfil the role of the antiphons which divide the psalms in regular Vespers services. Their non-liturgical character has led writers to question whether they should be within the service, or indeed whether this was Monteverdi's intention. In some versions of Monteverdi's Vespers (for example, those of Denis Stevens) the concertos are replaced with antiphons associated with the Virgin, although John Whenham in his analysis of the work argues that the collection as a whole should be regarded as a single liturgical and artistic entity.

All the psalms, and the Magnificat, are based on melodically limited and repetitious Gregorian chant psalm tones, around which Monteverdi builds a range of innovative textures. This stile concertato challenges the traditional cantus firmus, and is most evident in the "Sonata sopra Sancta Maria", written for eight string and wind instruments plus basso continuo, and a single soprano voice. Monteverdi uses modern rhythms, frequent metre changes and constantly varying textures; yet, according to John Eliot Gardiner, "for all the virtuosity of its instrumental writing and the evident care which has gone into the combinations of timbre", Monteverdi's chief concern was resolving the proper combination of words and music.

The actual musical ingredients of the Vespers were not novel to Mantua – concertato had been used by Lodovico Grossi da Viadana, a former choirmaster at the cathedral of Mantua, while the Sonata sopra had been anticipated by Archangelo Crotti in his Sancta Maria published in 1608. It is, writes Denis Arnold, Monteverdi's mixture of the various elements that makes the music unique. Arnold adds that the Vespers achieved fame and popularity only after their 20th-century rediscovery; they were not particularly regarded in Monteverdi's time.

=== Madrigals 1614–1638: books 6, 7 and 8 ===
==== Sixth book ====
During his years in Venice, Monteverdi published his sixth (1614), seventh (1619) and eighth (1638) books of madrigals. The sixth book consists of works written before the composer's departure from Mantua. Hans Redlich sees it as a transitional work, containing Monteverdi's last madrigal compositions in the manner of the prima pratica, together with music which is typical of the new style of expression which Monteverdi had displayed in the dramatic works of 1607–08. The central theme of the collection is loss; the best-known work is the five-voice version of the Lamento d'Arianna, which, says Massimo Ossi, gives "an object lesson in the close relationship between monodic recitative and counterpoint". The book contains Monteverdi's first settings of verses by Giambattista Marino, and two settings of Petrarch which Ossi considers the most extraordinary pieces in the volume, providing some "stunning musical moments".

==== Seventh book ====
While Monteverdi had looked backwards in the sixth book, he moved forward in the seventh book from the traditional concept of the madrigal, and from monody, in favour of chamber duets. There are exceptions, such the two solo lettere amorose (love letters) "Se i languidi miei sguardi" and "Se pur destina e vole", written to be performed genere rapresentativo – acted as well as sung. Of the duets which are the main features of the volume, Chew highlights "Ohimé, dov'è il mio ben, dov'è il mio core", a romanesca in which two high voices express dissonances above a repetitive bass pattern. The book also contains large-scale ensemble works, and the ballet Tirsi e Clori. This was the height of Monteverdi's "Marino period"; six of the pieces in the book are settings of the poet's verses. As Carter puts it, Monteverdi "embraced Marino's madrigalian kisses and love-bites with ... the enthusiasm typical of the period". Some commentators have opined that the composer should have had better poetic taste.

==== Eighth book ====
Madrigal: "Lamento della Ninfa" from Madrigali Guerrieri et Amorosi (eighth book)
Live recording

The eighth book, subtitled Madrigali guerrieri, et amorosi ... ("Madrigals of war and love") is structured in two symmetrical halves, one for "war" and one for "love". Each half begins with a six-voice setting, followed by an equally large-scale Petrarch setting, then a series of duets mainly for tenor voices, and concludes with a theatrical number and a final ballet. The "war" half contains several items written as tributes to the emperor Ferdinand III, who had succeeded to the Habsburg throne in 1637. Many of Monteverdi's familiar poets – Strozzi, Rinuccini, Tasso, Marino, Guarini – are represented in the settings.

It is difficult to gauge when many of the pieces were composed, although the ballet Mascherata dell' ingrate that ends the book dates back to 1608 and the celebration of the Gonzaga-Savoy marriage. The Combattimento di Tancredi e Clorinda, centrepiece of the "war" settings, had been written and performed in Venice in 1624; on its publication in the eighth book, Monteverdi explicitly linked it to his concept of concitato genera (otherwise stile concitato – "aroused style") that would "fittingly imitate the utterance and the accents of a brave man who is engaged in warfare", and implied that since he had originated this style, others had begun to copy it. The work employed for the first time instructions for the use of pizzicato string chords, and also evocations of fanfares and other sounds of combat.

The critic Andrew Clements describes the eighth book as "a statement of artistic principles and compositional authority", in which Monteverdi "shaped and expanded the madrigal form to accommodate what he wanted to do ... the pieces collected in Book Eight make up a treasury of what music in the first half the 17th century could possibly express."

=== Other Venetian music: 1614–1638 ===
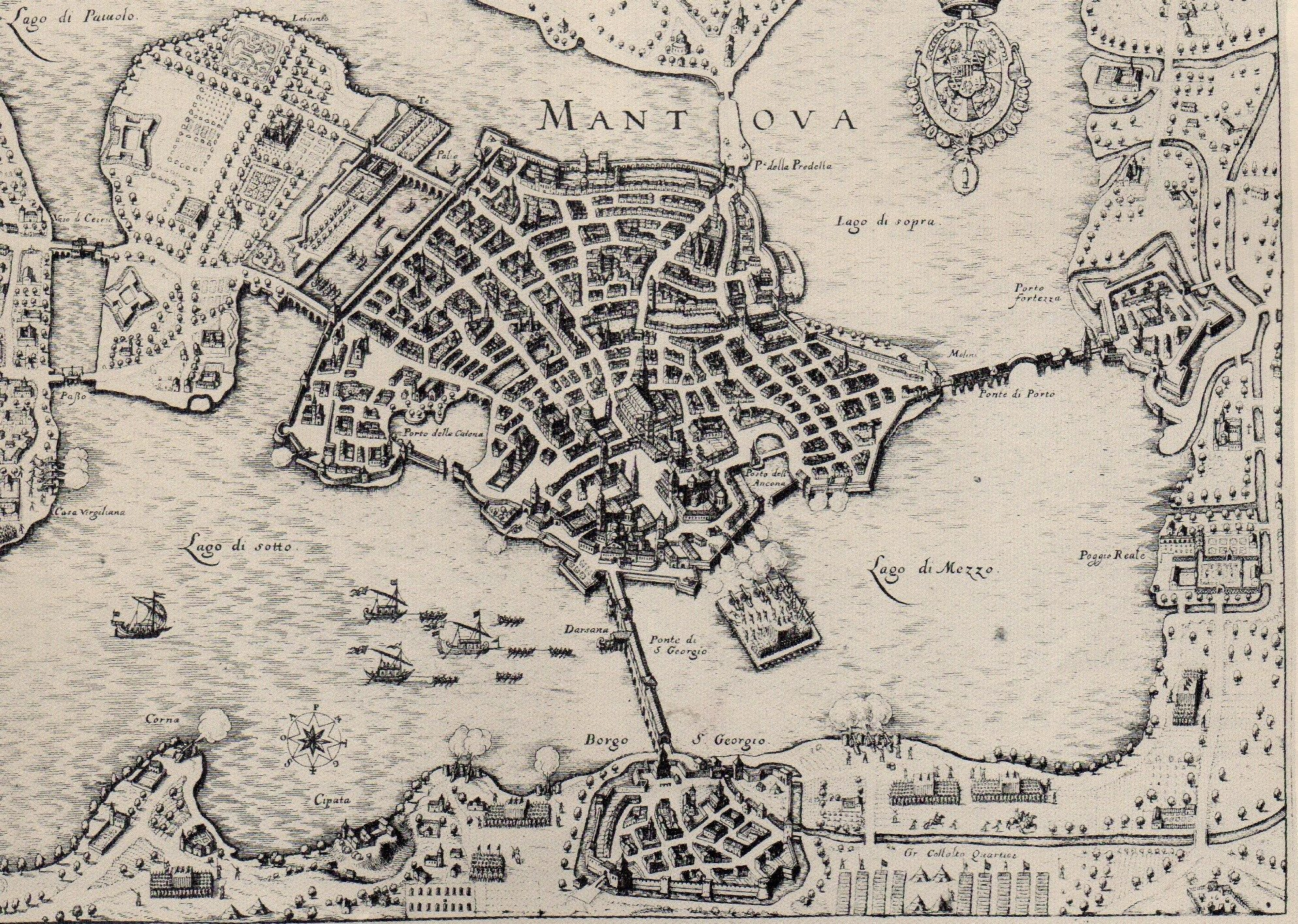
Mantua at the time of its sacking in 1630

During this period of his Venetian residency, Monteverdi composed quantities of sacred music. Numerous motets and other short works were included in anthologies by local publishers such as Giulio Cesare Bianchi (a former student of Monteverdi) and Lorenzo Calvi, and others were published elsewhere in Italy and Austria. The range of styles in the motets is broad, from simple strophic arias with string accompaniment to full-scale declamations with an alleluia finale.

Monteverdi retained emotional and political attachments to the Mantuan court and wrote for it, or undertook to write, large amounts of stage music including at least four operas. The ballet Tirsi e Clori survives through its inclusion in the seventh book, but the rest of the Mantuan dramatic music is lost. Many of the missing manuscripts may have disappeared in the wars that overcame Mantua in 1630. The most significant aspect of their loss, according to Carter, is the extent to which they might have provided musical links between Monteverdi's early Mantuan operas and those he wrote in Venice after 1638: "Without these links ... it is hard to a produce a coherent account of his development as a composer for the stage". Likewise, Janet Beat regrets that the 30-year gap hampers the study of how opera orchestration developed during those critical early years.

Apart from the madrigal books, Monteverdi's only published collection during this period was the volume of Scherzi musicale in 1632. For unknown reasons, the composer's name does not appear on the inscription, the dedication being signed by the Venetian printer Bartolomeo Magni; Carter surmises that the recently ordained Monteverdi may have wished to keep his distance from this secular collection. It mixes strophic continuo songs for solo voice with more complex works which employ continuous variation over repeated bass patterns. Chew selects the chaconne for two tenors, Zefiro torna e di soavi accenti, as the outstanding item in the collection: "[T]he greater part of this piece consists of repetitions of a bass pattern which ensures tonal unity of a simple kind, owing to its being framed as a simple cadence in a G major tonal type: over these repetitions, inventive variations unfold in virtuoso passage-work".

=== Late operas and final works ===
Main articles: Il ritorno d'Ulisse in patria; L'incoronazione di Poppea; Selva morale e spirituale

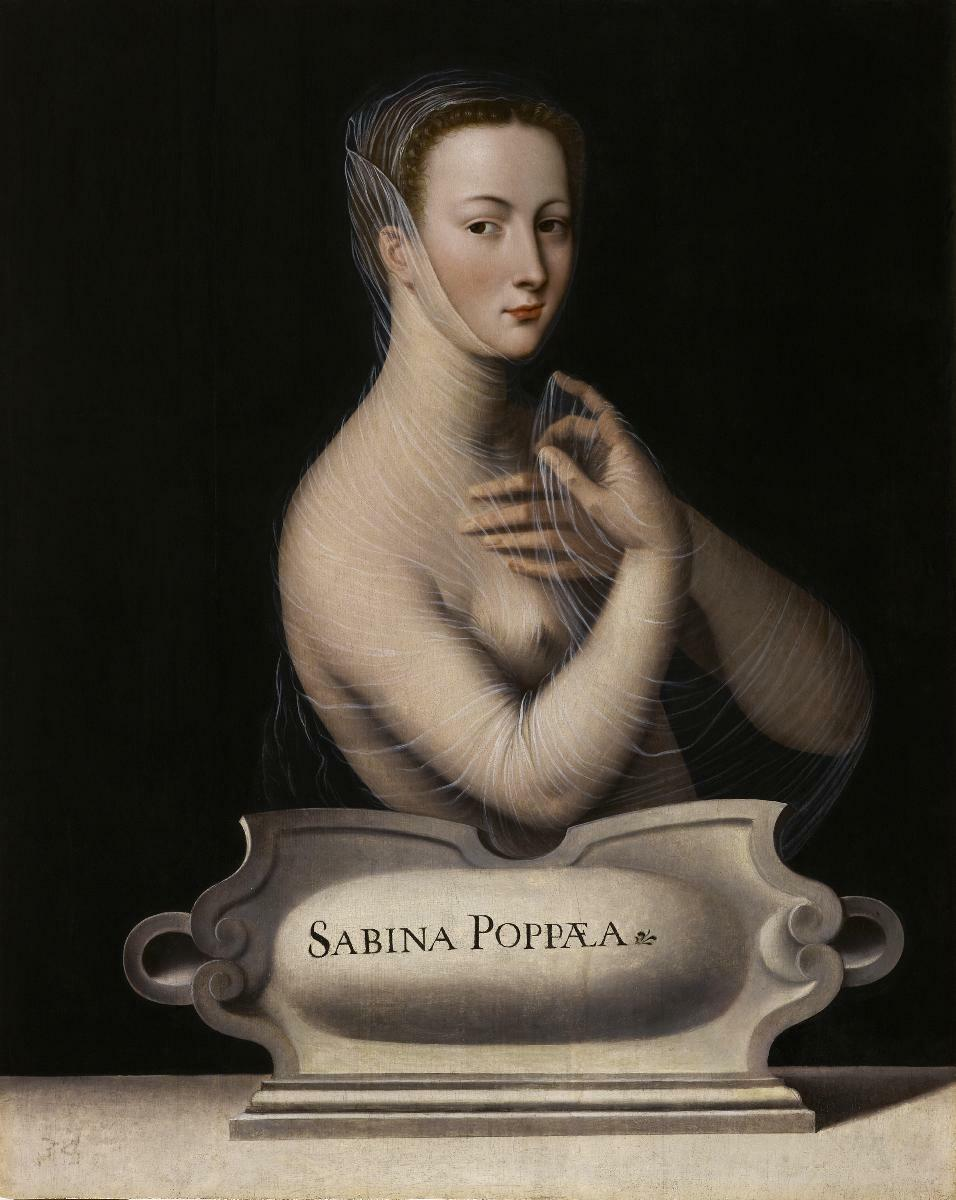
Poppea, represented in a 16th-century painting

The last years of Monteverdi's life were much occupied with opera for the Venetian stage. Richard Taruskin, in his Oxford History of Western Music, gave his chapter on this topic the title "Opera from Monteverdi to Monteverdi." This wording, originally proposed humorously by the Italian music historian Nino Pirrotta, is interpreted seriously by Taruskin as indicating that Monteverdi is significantly responsible for the transformation of the opera genre from a private entertainment of the nobility (as with Orfeo in 1607), to what became a major commercial genre, as exemplified by his opera L'incoronazione di Poppea (1643). His two surviving operatic works of this period, Il ritorno d'Ulisse in patria and L'incoronazione are held by Arnold to be the first "modern" operas; Il ritorno is the first Venetian opera to depart from what Ellen Rosand terms "the mythological pastoral". However, David Johnson in the North American Review warns audiences not to expect immediate affinity with Mozart, Verdi or Puccini: "You have to submit yourself to a much slower pace, to a much more chaste conception of melody, to a vocal style that is at first merely like dry declamation and only on repeated hearings begins to assume an extraordinary eloquence."

Il ritorno, says Carter, is clearly influenced by Monteverdi's earlier works. Penelope's lament in Act I is close in character to the lament from L'Arianna, while the martial episodes recall Il combattimento. Stile concitato is prominent in the fight scenes and in the slaying of Penelope's suitors. In L'incoronazione, Monteverdi represents moods and situations by specific musical devices: triple metre stands for the language of love; arpeggios demonstrate conflict; stile concitato represents rage. There is continuing debate about how much of the extant L'incoronazione music is Monteverdi's original, and how much is the work of others (there are, for instance, traces of music by Francesco Cavalli).

The Selva morale e spirituale of 1641, and the posthumous Messa et salmi published in 1650 (which was edited by Cavalli), are selections of the sacred music that Monteverdi wrote for San Marco during his 30-year tenure – much else was likely written but not published. The Selva morale volume opens with a series of madrigal settings on moral texts, dwelling on themes such as "the transitory nature of love, earthly rank and achievement, even existence itself". They are followed by a Mass in conservative style (stile antico), the high point of which is an extended seven-voice "Gloria". Scholars believe that this might have been written to celebrate the end of the 1631 plague. The rest of the volume is made up of numerous psalm settings, two Magnificats and three Salve Reginas. The Messa et salmi volume includes a stile antico Mass for four voices, a polyphonic setting of the psalm Laetatus Sum, and a version of the Litany of Lareto that Monteverdi had originally published in 1620.

The posthumous ninth book of madrigals was published in 1651, a miscellany dating back to the early 1630s, some items being repeats of previously published pieces, such as the popular duet O sia tranquillo il mare from 1638. The book includes a trio for three sopranos, "Come dolce oggi l'auretta", which is the only surviving music from the 1630 lost opera Proserpina rapita.

== Historical perspective ==
In his lifetime Monteverdi enjoyed considerable status among musicians and the public. This is evidenced by the scale of his funeral rites: "[W]ith truly royal pomp a catafalque was erected in the Chiesa de Padrini Minori de Frari, decorated all in mourning, but surrounded with so many candles that the church resembled a night sky luminous with stars". This glorification was transitory; Carter writes that in Monteverdi's day, music rarely survived beyond the circumstances of its initial performance and was quickly forgotten along with its creator. In this regard Monteverdi fared better than most. His operatic works were revived in several cities in the decade following his death; according to Severo Bonini, writing in 1651, every musical household in Italy possessed a copy of the Lamento d'Arianna.

The German composer Heinrich Schütz, who had studied in Venice under Giovanni Gabrieli shortly before Monteverdi's arrival there, possessed a copy of Il combattimento and himself took up elements of the stile concitato. On his second visit to Venice in 1628–1629, Arnold believes, Schütz absorbed the concepts of basso continuo and expressiveness of word-setting, but he opines that Schütz was more directly influenced by the style of the younger generation of Venetian composers, including Grandi and Giovanni Rovetta (the eventual successor to Monteverdi at San Marco). Schütz published a first book of Symphoniae sacrae, settings of biblical texts in the style of seconda pratica, in Venice in 1629. Es steh Gott auf, from his Symphoniae sacrae II, published in Dresden in 1647, contains specific quotations from Monteverdi.

After the 1650s, Monteverdi's name quickly disappears from contemporary accounts, his music generally forgotten except for the Lamento, the prototype of a genre that would endure well into the 18th century.

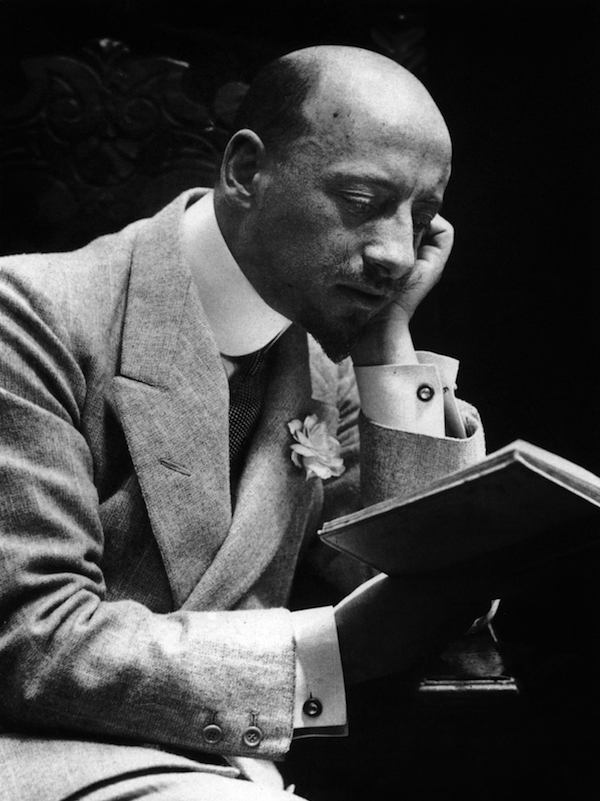
The writer Gabriele D'Annunzio, an early 20th-century admirer of Monteverdi

Interest in Monteverdi revived in the late 18th and early 19th centuries among music scholars in Germany and Italy, although he was still regarded as essentially a historical curiosity. Wider interest in the music itself began in 1881, when Robert Eitner published a shortened version of the Orfeo score. Around this time Kurt Vogel scored the madrigals from the original manuscripts, but more critical interest was shown in the operas, following the discovery of the L'incoronazione manuscript in 1888 and that of Il ritorno in 1904. Largely through the efforts of Vincent d'Indy, all three operas were staged in one form or another, during the first quarter of the 20th century: L'Orfeo in May 1911, L'incoronazione in February 1913 and Il ritorno in May 1925.

The Italian nationalist poet Gabriele D'Annunzio lauded Monteverdi and in his novel Il fuoco (1900) wrote of "il divino Claudio ... what a heroic soul, purely Italian in its essence!" His vision of Monteverdi as the true founder of Italian musical lyricism was adopted by musicians who worked with the regime of Benito Mussolini (1922–1945), including Gian Francesco Malipiero, Luigi Dallapiccola, and Mario Labroca, who contrasted Monteverdi with the decadence of the music of Richard Strauss, Claude Debussy and Igor Stravinsky.

In the years after the Second World War the operas began to be performed in the major opera houses, and eventually were established in the general repertory. The resuscitation of Monteverdi's sacred music took longer; he did not benefit from the Catholic Church's 19th-century revival of Renaissance music in the way that Palestrina did, perhaps, as Carter suggests, because Monteverdi was viewed chiefly as a secular composer. It was not until 1932 that the 1610 Vespers were published in a modern edition, followed by Redlich's revision two years later. Modern editions of the Selva morale and Missa e Salmi volumes were published respectively in 1940 and 1942.

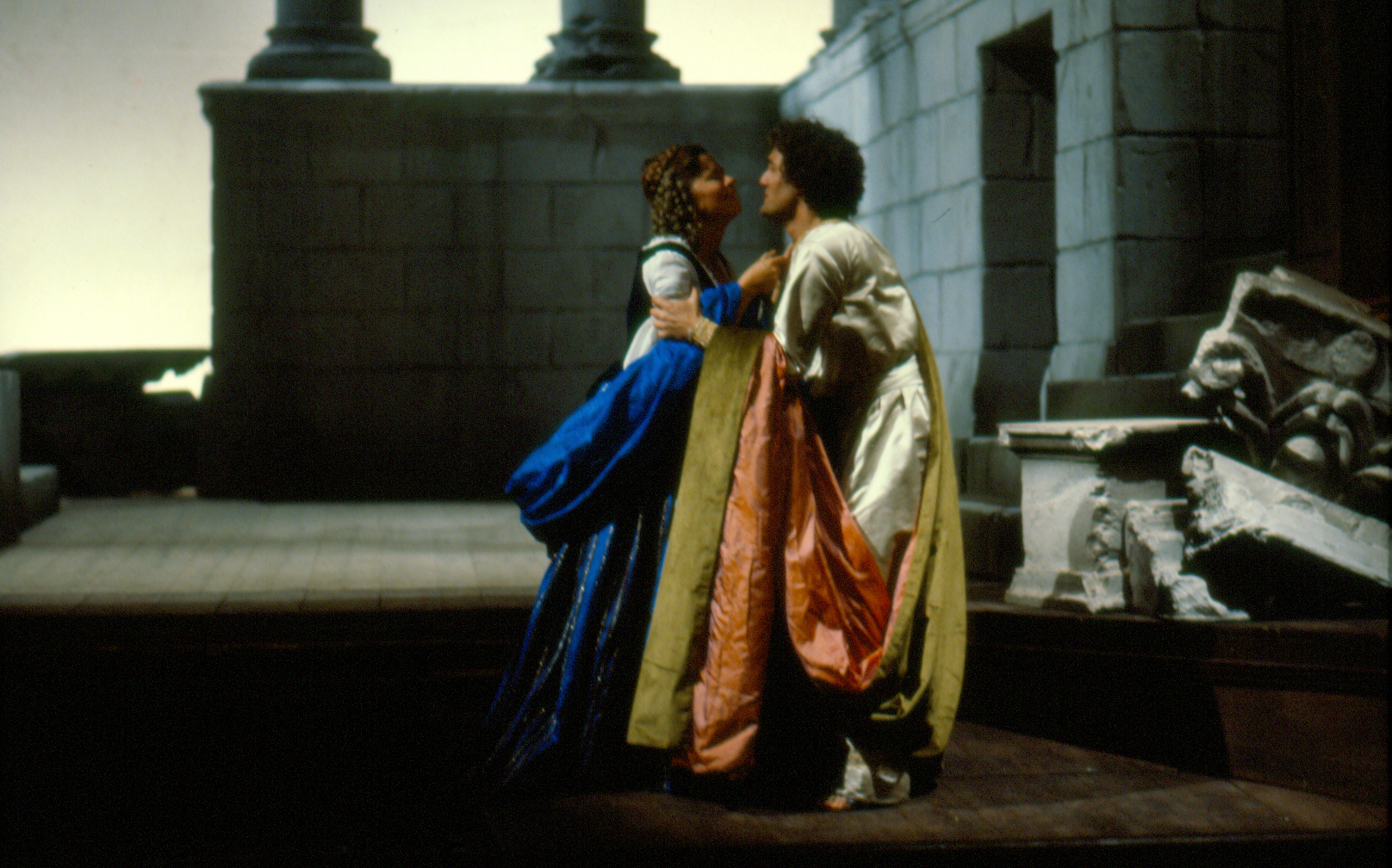
From the 1979 production of L'incoronazione di Poppea in Spoleto

The revival of public interest in Monteverdi's music gathered pace in the second half of the 20th century, reaching full spate in the general early-music revival of the 1970s, during which time the emphasis turned increasingly towards "authentic" performance using historical instruments. The magazine Gramophone notes over 30 recordings of the Vespers between 1976 and 2011, and 27 of Il combattimento di Tancredi e Clorinda between 1971 and 2013. Monteverdi's surviving operas are today regularly performed; the website Operabase notes 555 performances of the operas in 149 productions worldwide in the seasons 2011–2016, ranking Monteverdi at 30th position for all composers, and at 8th ranking for Italian opera composers. In 1985, Manfred H. Stattkus published an index to Monteverdi's works, the Stattkus-Verzeichnis, (revised in 2006) giving each composition an "SV" number, to be used for cataloguing and references.

Monteverdi is lauded by modern critics as "the most significant composer in late Renaissance and early Baroque Italy"; "one of the principal composers in the history of Western music"; and, routinely, as the first great opera composer. These assessments reflect a contemporary perspective, since his music was largely unknown to the composers who followed him during an extensive period, spanning more than two centuries after his death. It is, as Redlich and others have pointed out, the composers of the 20th and 21st century who have rediscovered Monteverdi and sought to make his music a basis for their own. Possibly, as Chew suggests, they are attracted by Monteverdi's reputation as "a Modern, a breaker of rules, against the Ancients, those who deferred to ancient authority" – although the composer was, essentially, a pragmatist, "showing what can only be described as an opportunistic and eclectic willingness to use whatever lay to hand for the purpose". In a letter dated 16 October 1633, Monteverdi appears to endorse the view of himself as a "modern": "I would rather be moderately praised for the new style than greatly praised for the ordinary". However, Chew, in his final summation, sees the composer historically as facing both ways, willing to use modern techniques but while at the same time protective of his status as a competent composer in the stile antico. Thus, says Chew, "his achievement was both retrospective and progressive". Monteverdi represents the late Renaissance era while simultaneously summing up much of the early Baroque. "And in one respect in particular, his achievement was enduring: the effective projection of human emotions in music, in a way adequate for theatre as well as for chamber music."
