= Stile concitato =

Stile concitato (rather Genere concitato) or "agitated style" is a Baroque style developed by Claudio Monteverdi with effects such as having rapid repeated notes and extended trills as symbols of bellicose agitation or anger. Kate Van Orden points out a precedent in Clément Janequin's "La Guerre" (1528). Agathe Sueur points out similarities and ambiguities between Monteverdi's genere concitato and stile concitato in rhetoric and poetry. Examples of stile concitato can be found in these works:

- Monteverdi: Il Combattimento di Tancredi e Clorinda (written 1624)
- Monteverdi: Il ritorno d'Ulisse in Patria (1639)
- Monteverdi: L'incoronazione di Poppea (1642)
- Giacomo Carissimi (1605–1674): Jephte
- Barbara Strozzi (1619–1677): Tradimento

== History ==
The earliest description of stile concitato comes from the foreword to Madrigali guerrieri, et amorosi ("Madrigals of war and love"), Claudio Monteverdi's eighth and final book of madrigals, published in 1638. Monteverdi wrote the following:

I have reflected that the principal passions or affections of our mind are three, namely, anger, moderation, and humility or supplication… The art of music also points clearly to these three in its terms "agitated," "soft," and "moderate" (concitato, molle, and temperato). In all the works of former composers I have indeed found examples of the "soft" and the "moderate," but never of the "agitated."

Monteverdi developed the musical style of stile concitato to represent the human emotion of agitation. He considered Il combattimento di Tancredi e Clorinda, one of the pieces from Madrigali guerrieri, et amorosi, to be the first instance of stile concitato. Stile concitato is represented musically in Il combattimento di Tancredi e Clorinda through the rapid repetition of sixteenth notes.

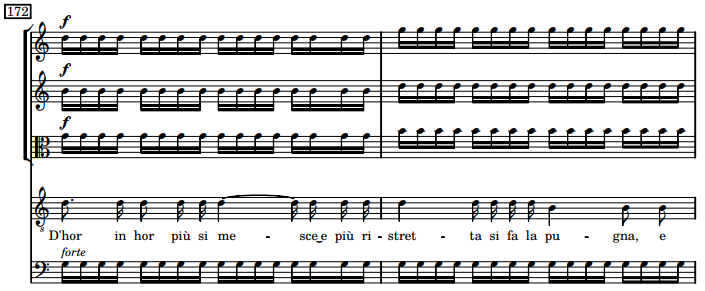
Example of stile concitato in Monteverdi's Il combattimento de Tancredi e Clorinda, mm.172-173.
