= Sulpitia Cesis =

Italian composer

Sulpitia Lodovica Cesis (15 May 1577 in Modena, Italy – ?), was an Italian composer as well as a well-regarded lutenist. Her father was Count Annibale Cesis and he gave 300 pieces of gold for her dowry when she entered the Augustinian convent in Modena in 1593. She was a nun at the convent of Saint Geminiano in Modena, although some sources report it as Saint Agostino. Her only known work is a volume of Motetti Spirituali, which she wrote in 1619.

== Aspects of Motetti Spirituali ==
It is composed of 23 motets for 2–12 voices. Although most of the motets are written in Latin, four are written in Italian. Some scholars believe that the piece was composed earlier than 1619 because of its style. Unlike her contemporaries, her work contains indications for instruments such as cornetts, trombones, violones, and archviolones. Her 12-voice works are also especially different from the 2-3 voiced works popular in the 17th century A bass part exists as well, which is interesting considering that this music was written for a group of cloistered nuns. One explanation is that this part was for the organ or viola da gamba. Another is that low parts may have been sung an octave higher than written, as she wrote this direction for some sections.

Cesis dedicated her collection to another nun of the same name, Anna Maria Cesis, who lived at the Convent of Santa Lucia in Rome. Both Sulpitia Cesis's and Anna Maria Cesis's convents were well known for their music.

Sulpitia Cesis is mentioned in Giovanni Battista Spaccini's chronicle of life in Modena, as the composer of a motet which was performed at the doors of San Geminiano in 1596 during a religious procession.

== Example of Sulpitia Cesis's work ==
"Mary Magdalena et altera Maria"

This song was not intended as a congregational hymn and is an excerpt from Matthew 28:1-7

Translation: Mary Magdalene and the other Mary/ went to the palace of the sepulcher.

It is Jesus whom you seek./ He is not here;/ he is risen as He said, and goes before you to Galilee./ There you will see Him.

For this text, "Cesis inserts melismatic phrases, underlining the name of Mary Magdalene and depicting the word surrexit (He is risen), in an otherwise dominantly homophonic texture and affectively uses harmonic suspension and dissonance to emphasize the miracle of Jesus' disappearance (Non est hic, "He is not there")".

== Motet titles ==
1. Hodie gloriosus
2. Cantate Domino
3. Io so ferito si
4. Jubilate Deo
5. Il mio piu vago sole
6. Pecco Signore
7. Salve gemma confessorum
8. O Crux splendidior
9. Cantemus Domino
10. Angelus ad pastores
11. Benedictus Dominus
12. Dulce nomen Jesu Christe
13. Stabat Mater
14. Hic est beatissimus
15. Quest'è la bella [...]
16. O Domine Jesu Christe
17. Sub tuum praesidium
18. Maria Magdalena
19. Ecce ego Joannes
20. Puer qui natus est
21. Magi videntes stellam
22. Ascendo ad Patrem
23. Parvulus filius
