= Giulio Cesare Monteverdi =

Italian composer and organist (1573–1630/31)

Giulio Cesare Monteverdi (1573–1630/31) was an Italian composer and organist. He was the younger brother of Claudio Monteverdi.

He entered the service of the Duke of Mantua in 1602, but was dismissed in 1612. He then worked in Crema and became maestro di cappella at the cathedral of Salò in 1620.

In 1611, he wrote an opera, Il rapimento di Proserpina (The rape of Proserpina), which was staged in Mantua. The music and text are lost, but it appears that it shared only the story line of Claudio's later opera Proserpina rapita (1630), which is also lost. He published a collection of motets in Venice in 1620 and a few other works, including two pieces which were included in Claudio's 1607 Scherzi musicali. He probably died of the plague in 1630 or 1631.
