= List of compositions by Claudio Monteverdi =

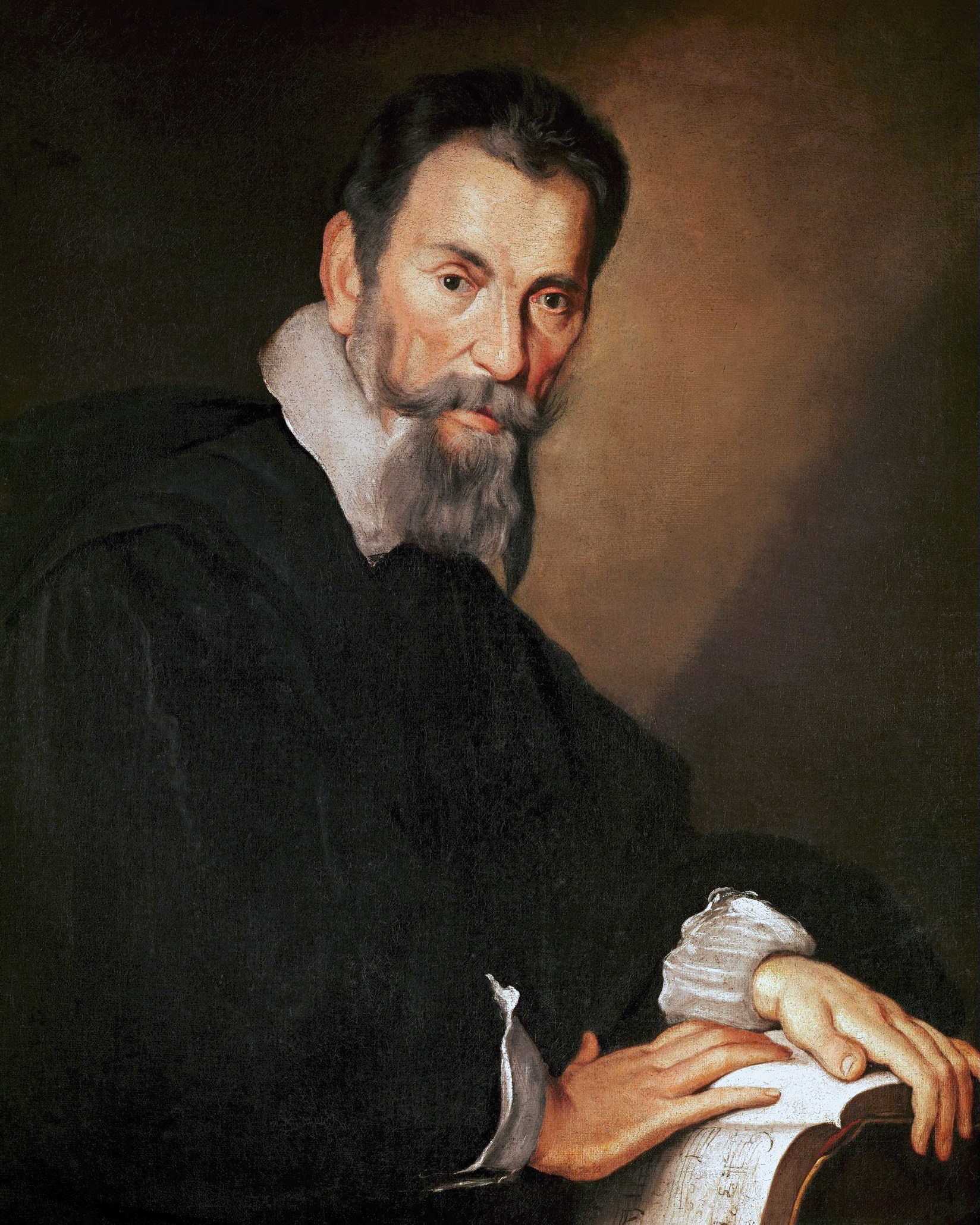
Monteverdi by Bernardo Strozzi

Claudio Monteverdi was active as a composer for almost six decades in the late 16th and early seventeenth centuries, essentially the period of transition from Renaissance to Baroque music. Much of Monteverdi's music was unpublished and is forever lost; the lists below include lost compositions only when there is performance history or other documentary evidence of the music's one-time existence.

In the "Voices/instrumentation" column of the chronological list, S= soprano, A= alto, T= tenor, Bar= baritone, B= Bass. The "SV" numbers are as per the Stattkus-Verzeichnis catalogue, first published in 1985 and revised in 2006.

== Chronological list of compositions ==
Year	Genre	SV number	Title	Voices/instrumentation	Publication history	Other information	Refs
1582	Sacred	207–229	Sacrae cantiunculae, liber primus (23 pieces, details table A below)	3 voices S, A and T	Monteverdi, Venice 1582		
1583	Sacred	179–189	Madrigali spirituali (11 pieces, details table B below)	4 voices	Monteverdi, Brescia 1583	Only bass partbook survives. Text: Fulvio Rorario	
1584	Madrigal/song	1–21	Canzonette, a tre voci (21 pieces, details table C below)	3 voices using Treble, S, A and T combinations	Monteverdi, Venice 1584		
1587	Madrigal/song	23–39	Madrigali, libro primo (First Book of Madrigals, 17 pieces, details table D below)	5 voices	Monteverdi, Venice 1587, repub. 1607, 1621	Text: Battista Guarini, Giovanni Battista Strozzi, Giovanni Battista Bonardo and others	
1590	Madrigal/song	40–59	Il secondo libro de madrigali (Second Book of Madrigals, 20 pieces, details table E below)	5 voices	Monteverdi, Venice 1590, repub. 1607, 1621	Texts: Torquato Tasso, Girolamo Casoni, Guarini and others	
1592	Madrigal/song	60–74	Il terzo libro de madrigali (Third Book of Madrigals, 15 pieces, details table F below)	5 voices	Venice 1592, repub. 1594, 1600, 1604, 1607, 1611, 1615, 1621	Texts: Tasso, Guarini and others	
1594	Madrigal/song	309, 314, 324, 331	Il primo libro delle canzonette a 3 voci (4 pieces, details table G below)	3 voices using Treble, S, Bar, and B combinations	Morsolino, Venice 1594	Texts: Scipio Cerreto and others	
1603	Madrigal/song	75–93	Il quarto libro de madrigali (Fourth Book of Madrigals, 19 pieces, details table H below)	5 voices	Monteverdi, Venice 1603, repub. 1605, 1607, 1611, 1615, 1622, 1644	Texts: Tasso, Guarini, Ottavio Rinuccini and others	
1604–05	Dramatic		Endimione (ballet)			Music and text lost	
1605	Madrigal/song		In nuovo fioretti a 3 voci	3 voices SSB, basso continuo	Franzoni, Venice 1605		
1605	Madrigal/song	94–106	Il quinto libro de madrigali (Fifth Book of Madrigals, 13 pieces, details table I below)	Mainly 5 voices, basso continuo	Monteverdi, Venice 1603, repub. 1606, 1610, 1611, 1613, 1615, 1620, 1643. Jacobsen, Egtved 1985	Texts: Guarini and others	
1607	Dramatic	318	Orfeo (favola in musica)		Monteverdi, Venice 1609, repub. 1615. Tarr, Paris 1974	Text: Alessandro Striggio. First perf. Mantua 24 February 1607	
1607	Dramatic	245	"De la belleza le dovute lodi" (ballet)		Venice 1609, repub. 1607 in Scherzi musicali	Text Striggio or Francesco Gonzaga	
1607	Madrigal/song	230–245	Scherzi musicali (16 pieces, details table J below)	3 voices, basso continuo, 2 violins	Monteverdi, Venice 1607	Text: Gabriello Chiabrera, Ansaldo Cebà and others	
1608	Dramatic	291	Arianna (tragedia in musica)		Text pub. Florence, Mantua, Venice 1608.	Text: Rinuccini. First perf. 28 May 1608. Music lost exc. Lamento d'Arianna SV22, pub. 1614 and 1623	
1608	Dramatic		Prologue to intermedio: "Ha cento lustri con etereo giri"			Text Chiabrera. First perf. 2 June 1608. Music lost.	
1608	Dramatic	167	Mascherata dell'ingrate (ballet)		Text pub. Mantua 1608	Text: Rinuccini. First perf. 4 June 1608. Rev. and pub. 1638 in Eighth Book	
1608	Madrigal/song	319, 329	G. de Wert: Il duodecimo libro de madrigali: "Pensier aspro e crudele"; "Sdegno la fiamma estinse"		Venice 1608	Text: Orsina Cavaletta. Bass partbook only survives	
1610	Sacred		Missa da capella a sei voci, fatta sopra il mottetto in illo tempore del Gomberti	6 voices SSATTB, organ	Venice 1610		
1610	Sacred	205–206	Sanctissimae Virgini missa senis vocibus... incl. Vespro della Beata Vergine (15 pieces, details table K below)	10 voices, basso continuo, inst. ensemble	Venice 1610		
1611	Sacred		Dixit Dominus	8 voices		Lost work (ref. Monteverdi letter 26 March )	
1611	Sacred		2 motets	2–5 voices		Lost work (ref. Monteverdi letter 26 March )	
1614	Madrigal/song	107–116	Il sesto libro de madrigali (Sixth Book of Madrigals, 10 pieces, details table L below)	5–7 voices, basso continuo	Monteverdi, Venice 1614, repub. 1615, 1620, 1639	Text: Rinuccini, Giambattista Marino and others	
1615	Madrigal/song	292	Parnassus musicus Ferdinandeus...: Cantate Domino canticum novum	2S, 2T, basso continuo	Bonornettti, Venice 1615		
1616	Dramatic		Tirsi e Clori (ballet)		Monteverdi, Venice 1619 (in Seventh Book)	Perf. January 1616 in Mantua	
1616–17	Dramatic		Le nozze di Tetide (favola marittima)			Text Scipione Agnelli. Project cancelled, music lost	
1617	Dramatic	333	Prologue to La Maddalena (sacre rappresentazione}		Venice 1617 in Musiche per La Maddelena	Text: Giovanni Battista Andreini. First perf. Mantua, March 1617 rev. Vienna 1629	
1618	Sacred	328	In Primo libra concerti ecclesiastici: "Sancta Maria succure miseria"	2S, basso continuo	G.B. Ala, Milan 1618	Text: Andreini. First perf. Mantua, March 1617 rev. Vienna 1629	
1619	Madrigal/song	117–145	Concerto: settimo libro de madrigali (Seventh Book of Madrigals, 29 pieces, details table M below)	1–6 voices, basso continuo, instr. ensemble	Venice 1619, repub. 1622, 1623, 1628, 1641	Text: Guarini, Marino, Chibrera, Tasso, Rinuccini and others	
1620	Dramatic		Andromeda: favola in musica		Text pub. Mantua 1620	Text: Ercole Marigliani. First perf. Mantua, betw. 1 and 3 March 1620. Music lost	
1620	Dramatic		Apollo (ballet)			Text Striggio. First perf. Mantua, betw. 1 and 3 March 1620. Text and music lost.	
1620	Sacred	293, 294, 298, 289	4 motets in Libro primo de motetti in lode d'Iddio nostro Signore. Details table N below	1–5 voices, basso continuo	G.C. Bianchi, Venice 1620		
1620	Sacred	204	"Laetaniae della Beata Vergine"	6 voices, basso continuo	G.C. Bianchi, Venice 1620. Repub. 1626 and 1650		
1621	Sacred		Requiem for Grand Duke Cosimo II of Tuscany			Perf. Venice, SS Giovanni e Paolo, 25 May 1621. Music lost.	
1621	Madrigal/song	305, 312	2 pieces in Symbolae diversorum musicum: "Fuge anima mea mundum" and "O beate viae".	2–5 voices, Bass continuo	Lorenz Calvi, Venice 1621		
1622	Dramatic		Contributions to prologue and 4 intermedi and licenza in La contesa di Amore e Cupido		Text pub. Mantua, 1620	Text: Marigliani. Perf. 18 January 1622, ducal palace Mantua	
1622	Sacred	313	1 piece in Promptuari musici concentus ecclesiasticos: "O bone Jesus, O pissime Jesu"	2S, basso continuo	Donfried, Strasburg 1622		
1623	Madrigal/song	22	1 piece in Il maggio fiorito arie, sonetti, madrigali: "Lasciatemi morire" (Lamento d'Arianna)	1–3 voices, basso continuo	G.B. Rocchigiani, Orvieto 1623	5-section version of Lamento d'Arianna	
1623	Madrigal/song	22, 141, 142	3 monodic versions of Lamento d'Arianna	Solo voice, basso continuo	Monteverdi, Venice 1623		
1623	Madrigal/song	249	1 piece in Madrigali e arie: "Ecco di dolci raggi il sol armsato"	Solo voice, basso continuo	G.B.Camarella, Venice 1623, repub. 1632		
1624	Sacred	301, 335, 326	3 sacred songs in Seconda raccolta de' sacri canti a 1–4 voci: "Ego flos campi"; "Venite sitientes"; "Salve o regina"	1–4 voices, basso continuo	Calvi, Venice 1624		
1624	Dramatic	153	Il combattimento di Tancredi e Clorinda		Pub. in Eighth Book, 1638	Text from Tasso's Gerusalemme liberata and Gerusalemme conquistata	
1624	Madrigal/song	315, 334	2 pieces in Madrigali del signor cavaliero Anselmi...: "O come vaghi" and "Taci Armelin, deh taci"	2–5 voices, basso continuo	Venice, 1624	Text: Giovanni Battista Anselmi	
1624	Madrigal/song	316, 310, 332	3 pieces in Quarto scherzo delle ariose vaghezze...: "Ohimé ch'io cado, ohimé; La mia turca che d'amor; Si dolce è l tormento	Solo voice, basso continuo	C. Milanuzzi, Venice 1624		
1625	Sacred	300	1 piece in Sacri affetti contesti da diversi eccelentissimi autori... : "Ego dormio et cor meum vigilat"	2–4 voices, basso continuo	F. Sammaruco, Rome 1625		
1625	Sacred	317, 297, 299, 327	4 pieces in Ghirlanda sacra scielta da diversi eccellentissimi...: "O quam pulchra es amica mea"; "Currite populi, psallite timpanis"; "Ecce sacrum paratum convivium"; "Salve regina"	Solo voice, basso continuo	L. Simonetti, Venice 1625		
1626	Sacred	204	1 piece in Rosarium litanarium beatae V. Mariae: "Laetaniae della Beata Virgine	6 voices, basso continuo	L. Calvi, Venice 1626, repub. 1650		
1626	Dramatic		Armida abbandonata (opera)			Text from Tasso's Gerusalemme liberata. Music lost.	
1627	Dramatic		La finta pazza Licori (opera)			Text: Strozzi. Music lost (if any written)	
1627	Sacred	295	1 piece in Psalmi de vespere a 4 voci: "Confitebor tibi Domine"	4 voices, basso continuo	G.M. Sabino da Turi, Naples 1627		
1628	Dramatic		Gli Argonauti (mascherata)			Text: Claudio Achillini. Music lost (if any written)	
1628	Madrigal/song		"La garda impoverir di pesci egregi" (part of sonnet cycle)	2 voices, basso continuo		Perf. 8 April 1628. Text: Strozzi, music lost.	
1628	Dramatic		Prologue and 5 intermedi for Teti e Flora		Text pub. Parma, 1629	Perf. 13 December 1628. Text: Ascanio Pio di Savoia. Music lost.	
1628	Dramatic		Mercurio e Marte (tournament)		Text pub. Parma, 1629	Perf. 21 December 1628. Text: Achillini. Music lost.	
1629	Sacred	303, 304, 285	3 pieces in Quarta raccolta de sacri canti: "Exulta filia Sion"; "Exultent coeli et gaudeant angeli"; "Salve O Regina"	1–5 voices, basso continuo, instr. ensemble	L. Calvi, Venice, 1629		
1630	Dramatic	323	Proserpina rapita (anatopismo)		Text pub. Venice, 1630	Perf. 16 April 1630. Text: Strozzi. Music lost ex. canzonetta "Come dolce oggi l'auretta"	
1632	Madrigal/song	150, 246–51	Scherzi musicali cioè arie...: 7 pieces, details table O below	1–2 voices, basso continuo	Monteverdi, Venice, 1632	Text: Rinuccini (SV251) and others.	
1634	Madrigal/song	320, 321	Arie di diversi: 2 pieces: "Perché, se m'odiavi"; "Più lieto il guardo"	Solo voice, basso continuo	A. Vincenti, Venice, 1634		
1636	Dramatic	154	"Volgendo il ciel per l'immortal sentiero" (ballet)		Pub in Eighth Book, 1638	Text: Rinuccini	
1637	Dramatic	A1	Ballo del Monte Verde in Vero e facil modo l'imparare e sonare... (ballet)		P. Milioni and L. Monte, Rome and Macerata, 1637		
1638	Madrigal/song	146–167	Madrigali guerriri, et amorosi...Libro ottavo (Eighth Book of Madrigals, 22 pieces, details table P below	1–8 voices, basso continuo, instr. ensemble	Monteverdi, Venice 1638	Texts: Petrarch, Strozzi, Rinuccini, Marino, Guarini and others	
1640	Dramatic	325	Il ritorno d'Ulisse in patria (opera)		Unpublished; music and text in MS	Perf. February 1640, Venice. Text: Giacomo Badoaro	
1640	Dramatic		La nozze d'Enea e Lavinia (opera)			Perf. Carnival, 1640–41, Venice. Text: Michelangelo Torcigliani. Music lost.	
1641	Dramatic		Vittoria d'Amore (ballet)			Perf. 7 February 1641, Venice. Text: Bernardo Morando. Music lost.	
1641	Sacred	252–288, 278a, 278b, 279a	Selva morale e spirituale: 43 pieces, details table Q below	1–5 voices, choirs, basso continuo, violins, viole da braccio/tromb.	Monteverdi, Venice 1641		
1643	Dramatic	308	L'incoronazione di Poppea (opera)	Text pub. 1656. Music survives in two MS version		Perf. early February 1643, Venice. Text: Giovanni Francesco Busenello.	
1645	Sacred	336	1 item in Motetti a voci solae diversi esselentissimi autori...Libro primo.: "Venite videte martirem"		Venice 1645	Published posthumously	
1650	Sacred	190–204	Messa et salmi:15 items, details table R below	1–8 voices	Venice, 1650	Published posthumously	
1651	Madrigal/song	168, 251, 149–150, 158–159, 169–178	Madrigali e canzonette...Libro nono: (Ninth Book of Madrigals. 16 items, details table S below )		Venice 1651	Published posthumously	
1651	Sacred	197, 302	2 items in Raccolta di motetti di Gasparo Casati... : "Laudate Dominum omnes gentes"; "En gratulemur hodie"		Venice 1651	Published posthumously	

== Sundry undated items ==
Source: Stattkus-Verzeichnis

- Ahi che si partì il mio bel sol adorno, SV 290
- Confitebor tibi domine a 1, SV 296
- Ecce sacrum paratum convivium, SV 299a
- Gloria a 8, SV 307
- Laudate pueri dominum a 6, SV 311
- Prima vedrò ch'in questi prati nascano, SV 322
- Salve Regina, SV 327
- Taci Armelin, deh taci, SV 334
- Venite videte martirem, SV 336
- Voglio di vita uscir, SV 337

== Details tables ==
Tables A to S
- A: Sacrae cantiunculae 1582

- Lapidabant Stephanum, SV 207
- Veni sponsa Christi, SV 208
- Ego sum pastor bonus, SV 209
- Surge propera amica mea, SV 210
- Ubi duo vel tres congregati fuerint, SV 211
- Quam pulchra es et quam decora amica mea, SV 212
- Ave Maria gratia plena, SV 213
- Domine pater et deus, SV 214
- Tu es pastor ovium, SV 215
- O magnum pietatis, SV 216
- O crux benedicta, SV 217
- Hodie Christus natus est, SV 218
- O domine Jesu Christe adoro te, SV 219
- Pater venit hora clarifica filium tuum, SV 220
- In tua patientia possedisti animam tuam, SV 221
- Angelus ad pastores ait, SV 222
- Salve crux pretiosa, SV 223
- Quia vidisti me Thoma credidisti, SV 224
- Lauda Syon salvatorem, SV 225
- O bone Iesu illumina oculos meos, SV 226
- Surgens Iesus dominus noster, SV 227
- Qui vult venire post me abneget se, SV 228
- Iusti tulerunt spolia impiorum, SV 229

- B: Madrigali spirituali 1583

- Sacrosancta di Dio veraci imago, SV179
- L'aura del ciel sempre fecond spiri, SV 180
- Aventurosa notte, in cui risplende, SV 181
- D'empi martiri e un mar d'orrori varca, SV 182
- Mentre la stell'appar nell'oriente, SV 183
- La rose lascia, gli amaranti e gigli, SV 184
- L'empio vestia di porpora e di bisso, SV 185
- L'uman discorso, quanto poc'importe, SV 186
- Dal sacro petto esce veloce dardo, SV 187
- Afflito e scalz'ove la sacra sponda, SV 188
- De' miei giovenil anni era l'amore, SV 189

- C: Canzonette, libro primo 1584

- Qual si può dir maggiore, SV 1
- Canzonette d'amore che m'uscite del cuore, SV 2
- La fiera vista e'l velenoso sguardo, SV 3
- Raggi dovè il mio bene non mi date più pene, SV 4
- Vita de l'alma mia, SV 5
- Il mio martir tengo celat al cuore, SV 6
- Son questi i crespi crini e questo il viso, SV 7
- Io mi vivea com' Aquila mirando, SV 8
- Su ch'el giorno è fore, SV 9
- Quando sperai del mio servir mercede, SV 10
- Come farò cuor mio quando mi parto, SV 11
- Corse a la morte il povero Narciso, SV 12
- Tu ridi sempre mai per darmi pene, SV 13
- Chi vuol veder d'inverno un dolc' aprile, SV 14
- Già mi credev' un sol esser in cielo, SV 15
- Godi pur del bel sen felice pulce, SV 16
- Giulia quel petto giace un bel giardino, SV 17
- Sì come crescon alla terra i fiori, SV 18
- Io son Fenice e voi sete la fiamma, SV 19
- Chi vuol veder un bosco folto e spesso, SV 20
- Hor care canzonette sicuramente andrete, SV 21

- D: Madrigali, libro primo (First Book of Madrigals) 1587

- Ch'ami la vita mia nel tuo bel nome, SV 23
- Se per havervi ohimè donato il core, SV 24
- A che tormi il ben mio s'io dico di morire, SV 25
- Amor per tua mercè vattene a quella, SV 26
- Baci soavi e cari, cibi della mia vita, SV 27
- Se pur non mi consenti ch'io ami te, SV 28
- Filli cara e amata dimmi per cortesia, SV 29
- Poiché del mio dolore tanto ti nutri amore, SV 30
- Fumia la pastorella tessendo ghirlandetta, SV 31
- Se nel partir da voi vita mia sento, SV 32
- Tra mille fiamme e tra mille catene, SV 33
- Usciam Ninfe homai fuor di questi boschi, SV 34
- Questa ordì il laccio, questa sì bella man, SV 35
- La vaga pastorella s'en va tra fiori, SV 36
- Amor sil tuo ferire desse tanto martire, SV 37
- Donna sio miro voi ghiaccio divengo, SV 38
- Ardo sì ma non t'amo, SV 39

- E: Il secondo libro de madrigali (Second Book of Madrigals) 1590

- Non si levava ancor l'alba novella, SV 40
- Bevea Fillide mia e nel ber dolcemente, SV 41
- Dolcissimi legami di parole amorose, SV 42
- Non giacinti o narcisi, SV 43
- Intorno a due vermiglie e vaghe labra, SV 44
- Non sono in queste rive fiori così vermigli, SV 45
- Tutte le bocche belle in questo nero volto, SV 46
- Donna nel mio ritorno il mio pensiero, SV 47
- Quell' ombra esser vorrei, SV 48
- S'andasse Amor a caccia, SV 49
- Mentre io miravo fiso de la mia donna, SV 50
- Ecco mormorar l'onde e tremolar le fronde, SV 51
- Dolcemente dormiva la mia Clori, SV 52
- Se tu mi lassi perfida tuo danno, SV 53
- La bocca onde l'asprissime parole solean uscir, SV 54
- Crudel perchè mi fuggi, SV 55
- Questo specchio ti dono rosa tu dami, SV 56
- Non mi è grave il morire, SV 57
- Ti spontò l'ali amor la donna mia, SV 58
- Cantai un tempo e se fu dolc' il canto, SV 59

- F: Il terzo libro de madrigali (Third Book of Madrigals) 1592

- La giovinetta pianta, SV 60
- O come è gran martire a celar suo desire, SV 61
- Sovra tenere herbette e bianchi fiori, SV 62
- O dolce anima mia dunque è pur vero, SV 63
- Stracciami pur il core ragion è ben ingrato, SV 64
- O rossignuol chin queste verdi fronde, SV 65
- Se per estremo ardore morir potesse un core, SV 66
- Vattene pur crudel con quella pace, SV 67
- O primavera gioventù dell anno, SV 68
- Perfidissimo volto ben lusata bellezza, SV 69
- Chio non tami cor mio, SV 70
- Occhi un tempo mia vita, SV 71
- Vivrò fra i miei tormenti e le mie cure, SV 72
- Lumi miei, cari lumi, SV 73
- Rimanti in pace a la dolente e bella Fillida, SV 74

- G: Il primo libro delle canzonette a 3 voci 1594

- Io ardo sì, ma'l foco è di tal sorte, SV 309
- Occhi miei se mirar più non debb' io, SV 314
- Quante son stelle in ciel, SV 324
- Se non mi date aita, SV 331

- H: Il quarto libro de madrigali (Fourth Book of Madrigals) 1603

- Ah dolente partita, ah fin de la mia vita, SV 75
- Cor mio mentre vi miro, SV 76
- Cor mio non mori e mori, SV 77
- Sfogava con le stelle, SV 78
- Volgea l'anima mia soavemente, SV 79
- Anima mia perdona a chi tè cruda, SV 80
- Luci serene e chiare voi mincendete, SV 81
- La piaga cho nel core donna onde lieta sei, SV 82
- Voi pur da me partite anima dura, SV 83
- A un giro sol de bell occhi lucenti, SV 84
- Ohimè se tanto amate di sentir, SV 85
- Io mi son giovinetta e rido e canto, SV 86
- Quel augellin che canta sì dolcemente, SV 87
- Non più guerra pietate occhi miei belli, SV 88
- Sì ch'io vorrei morire hora chio bacio amore, SV 89
- Anima dolorosa che vivendo, SV 90
- Anima del cor mio poi che da me misera me, SV 91
- Longe da te cor mio struggomi di dolore, SV 92
- Piagn'e sospira e quandi caldi raggi, SV 93

- I: Il quinto libro de madrigali (Fifth Book of Madrigals) 1605

- Cruda Amarilli che col nome ancora d'amar, SV 94
- O Mirtillo anima mia, SV 95
- Era l'anima mia già presso a l'ultim' hore, SV 96
- Ecco Silvio colei che in odio hai tanto, SV 97
- Ch'io t'ami e t'ami più de la mia vita, SV 98
- Che dar più vi poss' io, caro mio ben prendete, SV 99
- M'è più dolce il penar per Amarilli, SV 100
- Ahi come a un vago sol cortese giro, SV 101
- Troppo ben può questo tiranno amore, SV 102
- Amor se giusto sei fa che la donna mia, SV 103
- T'amo mia vita, la mia cara vita, SV 104
- E così a poco a poco torno farfalla, SV 105
- Questi vaghi concenti che gli augelletti intorno, SV 106

- J: Scherzi musicali 1607

- I bei legami che stami intorno, SV 230
- Amarilli onde m'assale, SV 231
- Fugge il verno dei dolori, SV 232
- Quando lalba in oriente, SV 233
- Non così tosto io miro, SV 234
- Damigella tutta bella, SV 235
- La pastorella mia spietata e rigida, SV 236
- O rosetta, che rosetta, SV 237
- Amorosa pupilletta che saetta, SV 238
- Vaghi rai di cigli ardenti, SV 239
- La violetta chen su lherbetta, SV 240
- Giovinetta ritrosetta, SV 241
- Dolci miei sospiri, SV 242
- Clori amorosa damor rubella, SV 243
- Lidia spina del mio core, SV 244
- Balletto: De la bellezza le dovute lodi, SV 245

- K: Sanctissimae Virgini missa senis vocibus... incl. Vespers of 1610

- Missa a 6 voci da capella "In illo tempore", SV 205
Vespro della Beata Vergine:
- Domine ad adiuvandum SV 206:1
- Dixit Dominus SV 206:2
- Nigra sum SV 206:3
- Laudate pueri Dominum SV 206:4
- Pulchra es SV 206:5
- Laetatus sum SV 206:6
- Duo seraphim SV 206:7
- Nisi Dominus SV 206:8
- Audi coelum verba mea SV 206:9
- Lauda Jerusalem SV 206:10
- Sonata sopra "Sancta Maria, ora pro nobis" SV 206:11
- Ave maris stella SV 206:12
- Magnificat (7 voices) SV 206:13
- Magnificat (6 voices) SV 206a:12

- L: Il sesto libro de madrigali (Sixth Book of Madrigals) 1614

- Lamento d'Arianna a 5, SV 107
- Zefiro torna el bel tempo rimena, SV 108
- Una donna fra laltre honesta e bella, SV 109
- A dio Florida bella il cor piagato, SV 110
- Lagrime d'amante al sepolcro dell amata, SV 111
- Ohimè il bel viso, ohimè il soave sguardo, SV 112
- Qui rise o Tirsi e qui ver me rivolse, SV 113
- Misero Alceo dal caro albergo fore, SV 114/114a
- Batto qui pianse Ergasto, ecco la riva, SV 115
- Presso un fiume tranquillo disse a Filena, SV 116/116a

- M: Concerto: settimo libro de madrigali (Seventh Book of Madrigals) 1619

- Tempro la cetra e per cantar gli honori di Marte, SV 117
- Non è di gentil core chi non arde d'amore, SV 118
- A quest olmo, a quest ombre et a quest onde, SV 119
- O come sei gentile caro augellino, SV 120
- Io son pur vezzosetta pastorella, SV 121
- O viva fiamma, o miei sospiri ardenti, SV 122
- Vorrei baciarti o Filli, SV 123
- Dice la mia bellissima Licori, SV 124
- Ah che non si conviene romper la fede, SV 125
- Non vedrò mai le stelle, SV 126
- Ecco vicine, o bella tigre, SV 127
- Perchè fuggi tra salci, ritrosetta ma bella, SV 128
- Tornate o cari baci a ritornarmi in vita, SV 129
- Soave libertate già per si lunga etate, SV 130
- S'el vostro cor madonna altrui pietoso tanto, SV 131
- Interrotte speranze, eterna fede, SV 132
- Augellin che la voce al canto spieghi, SV 133
- Vaga su spina ascosa e rosa ruggiadosa, SV 134
- Eccomi pronta ai baci, SV 135
- Parlo misero o taccio, SV 136
- Tu dormi, ah crudo core, SV 137
- Al lume delle stelle Tirsi sotto un alloro, SV 138
- Con che soavità labbra odorate, SV 139
- Ohimè dovè il mio ben, dov'è il mio core, SV 140
- Se i languidi miei sguardi, SV 141
- Se pur destina e vole, SV 142
- Chiome doro, bel tesoro, SV 143
- Amor che deggio far se non mi giova amar, SV 144
- Tirsi e Clori, SV 145

- N: 4 motets in Libro primo de motetti in lode d'Iddio nostro Signore... 1620

- Cantate domino canticum novum a 6, SV 293
- Christe adoramus te, SV 294
- Domine ne in furore tuo, SV 298
- Adoramus te Christe, SV 289

- O: Scherzi musicali cioè arie... 1632

- Maledetto sia laspetto, SV 246
- Quel sguardo sdegnosetto, SV 247
- Era già tutta mia, SV 248
- Ecco di dolci raggi il sol armato, SV 249
- Ecco di dolci raggi il sol armato, SV 249a
- Et è pur dunque verò, SV 250
- Zefiro torna e di soavi accenti, SV 251

- P: Madrigali guerriri, et amorosi...Libro ottavo (Eighth Book of Madrigals) 1638

Canti guerrieri:
- Altri canti d'Amor, SV 146
- Hor che'l ciel e la terra e'l vento tace, SV 147
- Gira il nemico insidioso amore, SV 148
- Se vittorie sì belle, SV 149
- Armato il cor dadamantina fede, SV 150
- Ogni amante è guerrier, SV 151
- Ardo avvampo mi struggo, ardo accorete amici, SV 152
- Combattimento di Tancredi e Clorinda, SV 153
- Ballo: Movete al mio bel suon le piante snelle, SV 154
Canti amorosi:
- Altri canti di Marte e di sua schiera, SV 155
- Vago augelletto che cantando vai, SV 156
- Mentre vaga Angioletta, SV 157
- Ardo e scoprir ahi lasso, SV 158
- O sia tranquillo il mare, SV 159
- Ninfa che scalza il piede, SV 160
- Dolcissimo uscignolo, SV 161
- Chi vol haver felice e lieto il core, SV 162
- Lamento della Ninfa, SV 163
- Perchè ten fuggi o Fillide, SV 164
- Non partir ritrosetta troppo lieve e incostante, SV 165
- Su pastorelli vezzosi, SV 166
- Ballo delle ingrate, SV 167

- Q: Selva morale e spirituale 1641

- O ciechi il tanto affaticar che giova, SV 252
- Voi chascoltate in rime sparse il suono, SV 253
- E questa vita un lampo, SV 254
- Spuntava il dì quando la rosa sovra, SV 255
- Chi vol minnamori, SV 256
- Messa a 4 da capella, SV 257
- Messa a 4 da capella, SV 257a
- Gloria, SV 258
- Crucifixus, SV 259
- Et resurrexit, SV 260
- Et iterum venturus est, SV 261
- Ab aeterno ordinata sum, SV 262
- Dixit dominus I, a 8 in g, SV 263
- Dixit dominus II, a 8 in d, SV 264
- Confitebor tibi domine I, a 8, SV 265
- Confitebor tibi domine II, a 3, SV 266
- Confitebor tibi domine III, a 5, SV 267
- Confitebor tibi domine IIIa, a 1, SV 267a
- Beatus vir I, a 6, SV 268
- Beatus vir II, a 5, SV 269
- Laudate pueri dominum I, a 5, SV 270
- Laudate pueri dominum II, a 5, SV 271
- Laudate dominum omnes gentes I, a 8, SV 272
- Laudate dominum omnes gentes Ia, a 5, SV 272a
- Laudate dominum omnes gentes II, SV 273
- Laudate dominum omnes gentes III, SV 274
- Credidi propter quod locutus sum, SV 275
- Memento domine David, SV 276
- Sanctorum meritis I, SV 277
- Sanctorum meritis II, SV 278
- Deus tuorum militum I, a 1, SV 278a
- Iste confessor I, a 1, SV 278b
- Iste confessor II, a 2, SV 279
- Ut queant laxis, SV 279a
- Deus tuorum militum II, a 3, SV 280
- Magnificat I, a 6, SV 281
- Magnificat II, a 4, SV 282
- Salve Regina I, SV 283
- Salve Regina II, SV 284
- Salve Regina III, SV 285
- Jubilet tota civitas, SV 286
- Laudate dominum in sanctis eius, SV 287
- Pianto della Madonna, SV 288

- R: Messa et salmi 1650

- Messa a 4 voci da capella, SV 190
- Dixit dominus I, a 8, SV 191
- Dixit dominus II, a 8, SV 192
- Confitebor tibi domine I, a 1, SV 193
- Confitebor tibi domine II, a 2, SV 194
- Laudate pueri dominum, SV 196
- Laudate dominum omnes gentes, SV 197
- Laudate dominum omnes gentes, SV 197a
- Laetatus sum I, a 6, SV 198
- Laetatus sum II, a 5, SV 199
- Nisi dominus I, a 3, SV 200
- Nisi dominus II, a 6, SV 201
- Lauda Jerusalem dominum I, a 3, SV 202
- Lauda Jerusalem dominum II, a 5, SV 203
- Letanie della Beata Vergine, SV 204

- S: Madrigali e canzonette...Libro nono: (Ninth Book of Madrigals) 1651

- Se vittorie si belle SV 149
- Armato il cor d'adamantina, SV 150
- Ardo e scoprir, ahi Iasso, SV 158
- O sia tranquillo il mare, SV 159
- Bel pastor del cui bel guardo, SV 168
- Alcun non mi consigli, SV 169
- Di far sempre gioire, SV 170
- Quando dentro al tuo seno, SV 171
- Non voglio amare, SV 172
- Come dolce hoggi lauretta spira, SV 173
- Alle danze, alle gioie, ai diletti, SV 174
- Perchè se modiavi, SV 175
- Sì chio vamo, occhi vaghi, occhi belli, SV 176
- Su pastorelli vezzosi, SV 177
- O mio bene, o mia vita, SV 178
- Zefiro torna e di soavi accenti, SV 251

== See also ==
List of operas by Claudio Monteverdi
