= List of operas by Claudio Monteverdi =

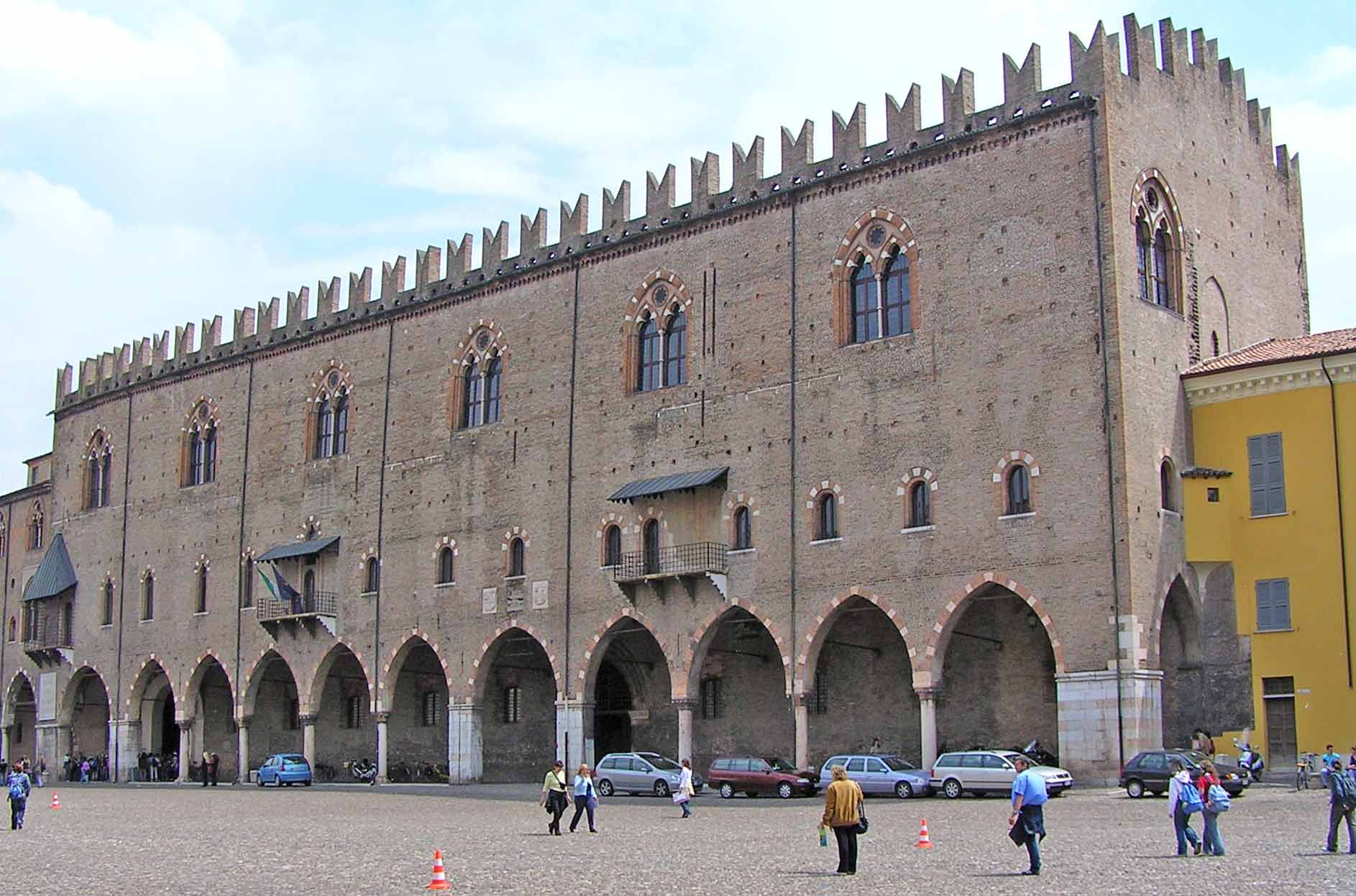
The Ducal Palace in Mantua, where L'Orfeo was premiered in 1607

The Italian composer Claudio Monteverdi (1567–1643) wrote several works for the stage between 1604 and 1643, including ten in the then-emerging opera genre. Of these, both the music and libretto for three are extant: L'Orfeo (1607), Il ritorno d'Ulisse in patria (1640) and L'incoronazione di Poppea (1643). Seven other opera projects are known; four were completed and performed during Monteverdi's lifetime, while he abandoned another three at some point. The libretto has survived for some of these lost operas.

The opera genre emerged during Monteverdi's earlier career, first as courtly entertainment trying to revive Greek theatre. The first known work to be regarded as an opera in the modern sense is Dafne (1598) by Jacopo Peri, and his Euridice (1600) is the earliest surviving one. Since Monteverdi served as the court composer for the Gonzaga family from 1590 to 1612, he likely joined Duke Vincenzo Gonzaga in Florence for the 6 October 1600 premiere of Euridice. While Monteverdi's own impressions of the work are unknown, the duke realised the potential of this new art form and sought to gain prestige from the patronage of it. Therefore, he commissioned Monteverdi in late 1606 for a work which is now considered as the "birth of Western Opera", L'Orfeo, on a libretto by Alessandro Striggio the Younger.

In 1613 Monteverdi became maestro di cappella at St Mark's Basilica in Venice, where he continued to compose operas for the Gonzaga court and later for the Teatro Santi Giovanni e Paolo. The only two to survive are Il ritorno d'Ulisse in patria on a libretto by Giacomo Badoaro and his final opera, L'incoronazione di Poppea, on a book by Giovanni Francesco Busenello. Seven of his operas are lost. Of these, L'Arianna, Andromeda, Proserpina rapita and Le nozze d'Enea con Lavinia were completed and performed during Monteverdi's lifetime. The other three lost operas, Le nozze di Tetide, La finta pazza Licori and Armida abbandonata, were never finished, so it is unknown how much music was completed, if any. For some of them, at least the libretto survived, by authors including Scipione Agnelli, Ercole Marigliani, Ottavio Rinuccini, Giulio Strozzi and Torquato Tasso.

The term opera was not widely used until the late 17th century, so Monteverdi's musical stage works were known by various names such as favola in musica (musical fable), dramma in musica (musical drama), or tragedia in musica (musical tragedy). Monteverdi was instrumental in developing and popularizing the genre for public musical theatre, his L'Orfeo is the earliest opera still regularly performed.

== List of operas ==
survived / Libretto and music extant; fragments / Libretto and fragments of the music extant	libretto / Libretto extant, music lost; lost / Libretto and music lost

Operas by Claudio Monteverdi
Period (Note: Period at which the opera was written)	Title	Status	Genre	Librettist	Premiere			SV (Note: Catalogue number in the Stattkus-Verzeichnis, if assigned)
Period	Title	Status	Genre	Librettist	Date	Venue	Occasion	SV
1606–07	L'Orfeo	survived	Favola in musica	Striggio	Mantua; 4 February 1607	Ducal Palace	Mantua Carnival	318; Score
1607–08	L'Arianna	fragments	Tragedia in musica	Rinuccini	Mantua; 28 May 1608	Ducal Palace	Ducal wedding	291; Score
1639 (rev.)	L'Arianna	fragments	Tragedia in musica	Rinuccini	Venice; 1639–1640	San Moisè	Venice Carnival	291; Score
1616–17	Le nozze di Tetide	lost	Favola marittima (Note: The exact genre of this work is uncertain and referred to in a number of ways: an "opera", an "operatic composition", or a favola marittima ("sea story"), the name by which Monteverdi first described it.)	Agnelli	Incomplete		Ducal wedding	–
1618–20	Andromeda	libretto	Favola in musica	Marigliani	Mantua; 1 March 1620	Ducal Palace (probably)	Mantua Carnival	–
1626	Armida abbandonata	libretto	–	Tasso (Note: The words were not written specifically for the opera as they were adapted from poems by Tasso.)	Incomplete		Ducal wedding	–
1627	La finta pazza Licori	lost	–	Strozzi	Incomplete		Possibly ducal ascension	–
1630	Proserpina rapita	fragment (Note: Only a single song for three voices, "Come dolce oggi l'auretta", survives.)	Anatopismo (Note: Known as an "anatopismo", but the meaning of the term is unknown.)	Strozzi	Venice; 16 April 1630	Mocenigo Palace	Wedding	323; Score
1640	Il ritorno d'Ulisse in patria	survived	Dramma per musica	Badoaro	Venice; 1639–40	Teatro Santi Giovanni e Paolo	Venice Carnival	325; Score
1641	Le nozze d'Enea con Lavinia (Note: Alternatively known as Le nozze d'Enea e Lavinia or Le nozze d'Enea in Lavinia)	libretto	Tragedia di lieto fine	Badoaro	Venice; 1640–41	Teatro Santi Giovanni e Paolo	Venice Carnival	–
1643	L'incoronazione di Poppea	survived	Dramma musicale (Note: Sometimes referred to as an "opera regia")	Busenello	Venice; 1643	Teatro Santi Giovanni e Paolo	Venice Carnival	308; Score

== Overview of operas ==
=== L'Orfeo ===
(English: "Orfeo")

Monteverdi composed L'Orfeo, a favola in musica (story in music), to a libretto by Alessandro Striggio for the annual carnival season in Mantua in 1607. Commissioned by the Accademia degli Invaghiti, it was premiered at the Ducal Palace on 4 February 1607. The work is the earliest opera still frequently performed and recorded. The libretto is written with dramatic instinct, different from earlier experiments in the new genre.

=== L'Arianna ===
(English: "Ariadne")

L'Arianna, a tragedia in musica (tragedy in music), was written for the wedding celebrations of Duke Vincenzo's oldest son and heir Francesco and Margaret of Savoy. The libretto by Rinuccini is based on the Greek Ariadne myth. It was premiered at the Ducal Palace on 28 May 1608.

=== Le nozze di Tetide ===
(English: "The wedding of Thetis")

Le nozze di Tetide, a favola marittima (maritime story), was a project for the wedding celebrations of Duke Ferdinando and Catherine de' Medici. Monteverdi was given the libretto by Scipione Agnelli without an author's name, which he criticised in a December 1616 letter. He began the composition, until the commission was withdrawn in January 1617.

=== Andromeda ===
Andromeda is a favola in musica commissioned by Don Vincenzo Gonzaga for the Mantua Carnival of March 1618, set to a libretto by Marigliani. Due to Monteverdi's disinterest it took two years to complete and premiered during the 1620 Carnival season, 1–3 March. The music is lost, but the libretto, long believed lost, was rediscovered in 1984.

=== Armida abbandonata ===
(English: "The abandoned Armida")

Armida abbandonata was written to a libretto by Torquato Tasso, and intended for the wedding celebrations of Duke Odoardo of Parma and Margherita de' Medici. Monteverdi completed the score, but the performance was canceled due to the duke's death at the end of December 1627. Only a song for three voices, "Come dolce oggi l'auretta", survives.

=== La finta pazza Licori ===
(English: "The feigned madwoman Licori")

La finta pazza Licori was commissioned by the Mantua court secretary, Alessandro Striggio the Younger, probably to celebrate the ascension of Duke Vincenzo II. The work is the first known attempt at a comic opera, but Striggio did not like Strozzi's libretto and cancelled the commission in September 1627.

=== Proserpina rapita ===
(English: "The rape of Proserpine")

Proserpina rapita, an anatopismo, was composed to a libretto by Strozzi for the wedding celebrations of Lorenzo Giustiniani and Giustiniana Mocenigo, and premiered at the Mocenigo Palace in Venice on 16 April 1630. Only a song for three voices, "Come dolce oggi l'auretta", survived.

=== Il ritorno d'Ulisse in patria ===
(English: "The return of Ulysses to his homeland")

After the first public theatre opened in Venice, the Teatro San Cassiano in 1637, Monteverdi composed a trilogy of operas for public theatre in Venice, beginning with Il ritorno d'Ulisse in patria, a dramma per musica, to a libretto by Badoaro. It was premiered at the Teatro Santi Giovanni e Paolo during the 1639–40 carnival season.

=== Le nozze d'Enea con Lavinia ===
(English: "The marriage of Aeneas to Lavinia")

Le nozze d'Enea con Lavinia, a tragedia di lieto fine (happy ending tragedy), with another libretto by Badoaro, was the second opera written for the Teatro Santi Giovanni e Paolo and first performed in the 1640–41 carnival season. While the libretto survives, the music is lost.

=== L'incoronazione di Poppea ===
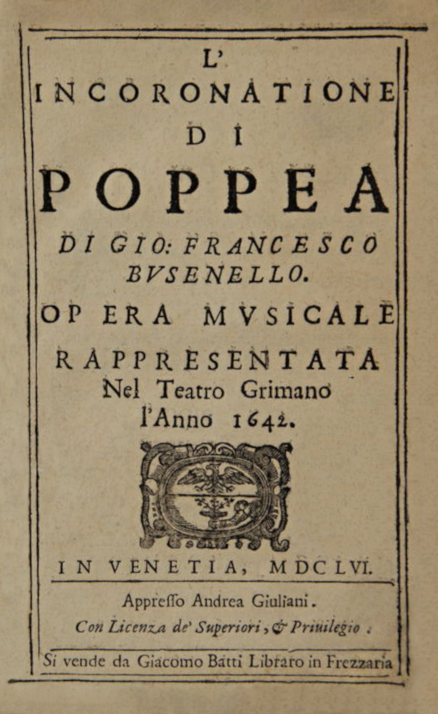
Title page of the libretto

(English: "The coronation of Poppaea")

L'incoronazione di Poppea is a dramma musicale set to a libretto by Busenello. It is the final opera of the trilogy written for the Teatro Santi Giovanni e Paolo, where it was first performed during the 1643 carnival season. It was one of the first operas based on historical events and people.
