= Lost operas by Claudio Monteverdi =

Lost operas written between 1604 and 1643

Lost operas
- Opera projects by Claudio Monteverdi
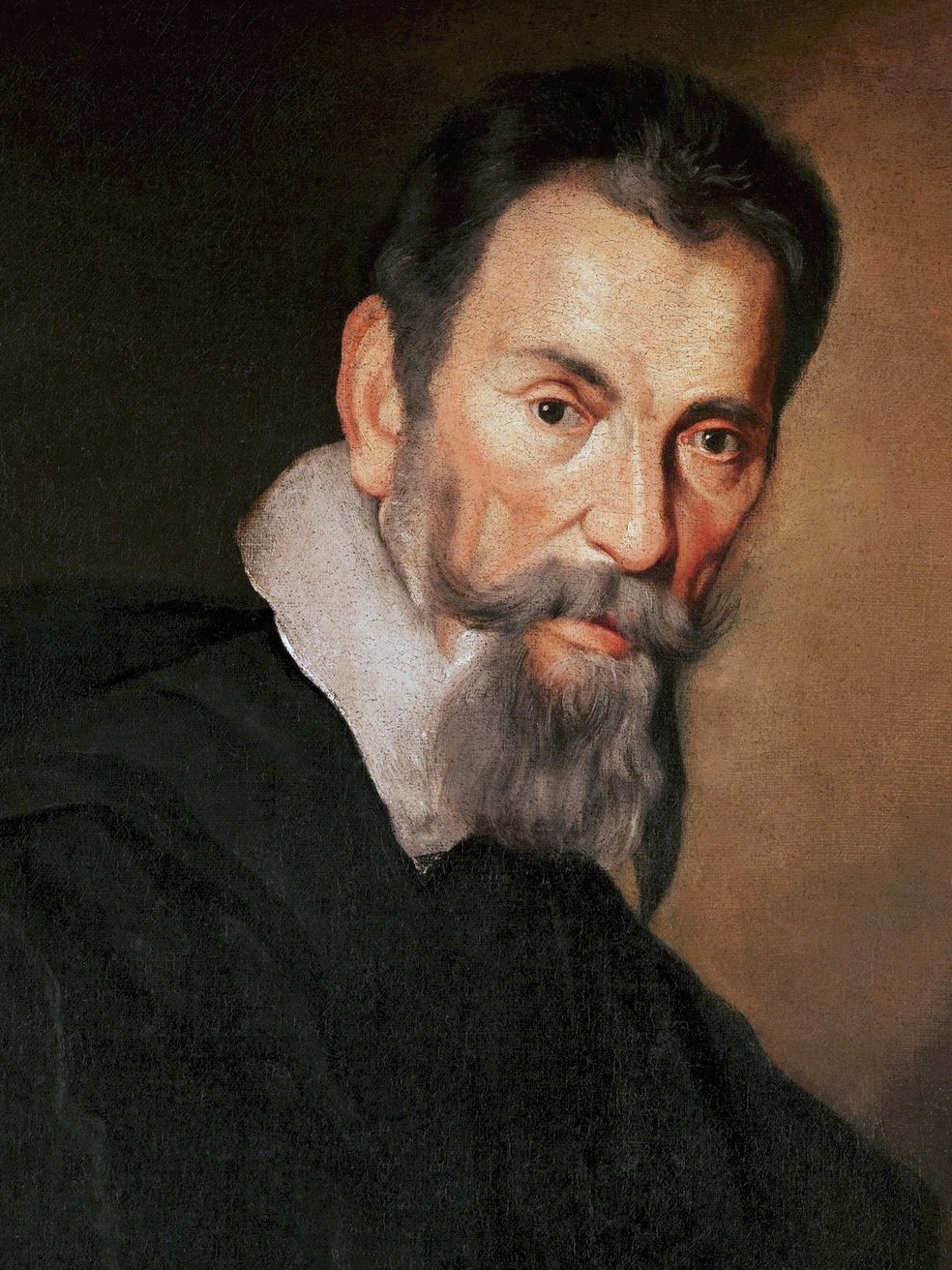
- The composer around 1640
- L'Arianna (Mantua, 1607–08); Le nozze di Tetide (Mantua, 1616–17); Andromeda (Mantua, 1618–20); La finta pazza Licori (Mantua, 1627–28); Armida abbandonata (Mantua, 1627–28); Proserpina rapita (Venice, 1630); Le nozze d'Enea con Lavinia (Venice, 1641)

The Italian composer Claudio Monteverdi (1567–1643), in addition to a large output of church music and madrigals, wrote prolifically for the stage. His theatrical works were written between 1604 and 1643 and included operas, of which three—L'Orfeo (1607), Il ritorno d'Ulisse in patria (1640) and L'incoronazione di Poppea (1643)—have survived with their music and librettos intact. In the case of the other seven operas, the music has disappeared almost entirely, although some of the librettos exist. The loss of these works, written during a critical period of early opera history, has been much regretted by commentators and musicologists.

Opera, as a musical and theatrical genre, began to emerge during the early part of Monteverdi's career, initially as a form of courtly entertainment. With other composers, he played a leading part in its development into the main form of public musical theatre. His first opera, L'Orfeo, written in 1607 for the Mantuan court, which employed him, was a major success. In the years that followed, at Mantua and in his later capacity as maestro di cappella (director of music) at St Mark's Basilica in Venice, Monteverdi continued to write theatrical music in various genres, including operas, dances, and intermedi (short musical interludes inserted into straight plays). Because in Monteverdi's times stage music was rarely thought to have much utility after its initial performance, much of this music vanished shortly after its creation.

Most of the available information relating to the seven lost operas has been deduced from contemporary documents, including the many letters that Monteverdi wrote. These papers provide irrefutable evidence that four of these works—L'Arianna, Andromeda, Proserpina rapita and Le nozze d'Enea con Lavinia—were completed and performed in Monteverdi's lifetime, but of their music, only the famous lament from L'Arianna and a trio from Proserpina are known to have survived. The other three lost operas—Le nozze di Tetide, La finta pazza Licori and Armida abbandonata—were abandoned by Monteverdi before completion; how much of their music was actually written is unknown.

== Background ==
Monteverdi's creative life covered more than 50 years. Between 1590 and 1612 he served as a musician in the Gonzaga court in Mantua, followed by 30 years (1613–43) as maestro di capella at St Mark's Basilica in Venice. This timespan saw opera develop, from its beginnings as a limited form of court entertainment, to become part of the mainstream of public musical theatre. Before the Italian word "opera"—short for opera in musica ("musical work")—came into general use around 1634, musical stage works were typically termed favola in musica (musical fable), dramma in musica (musical drama), or tragedia in musica ("musical tragedy"); Monteverdi used these and similar descriptions for many of his early operatic projects.

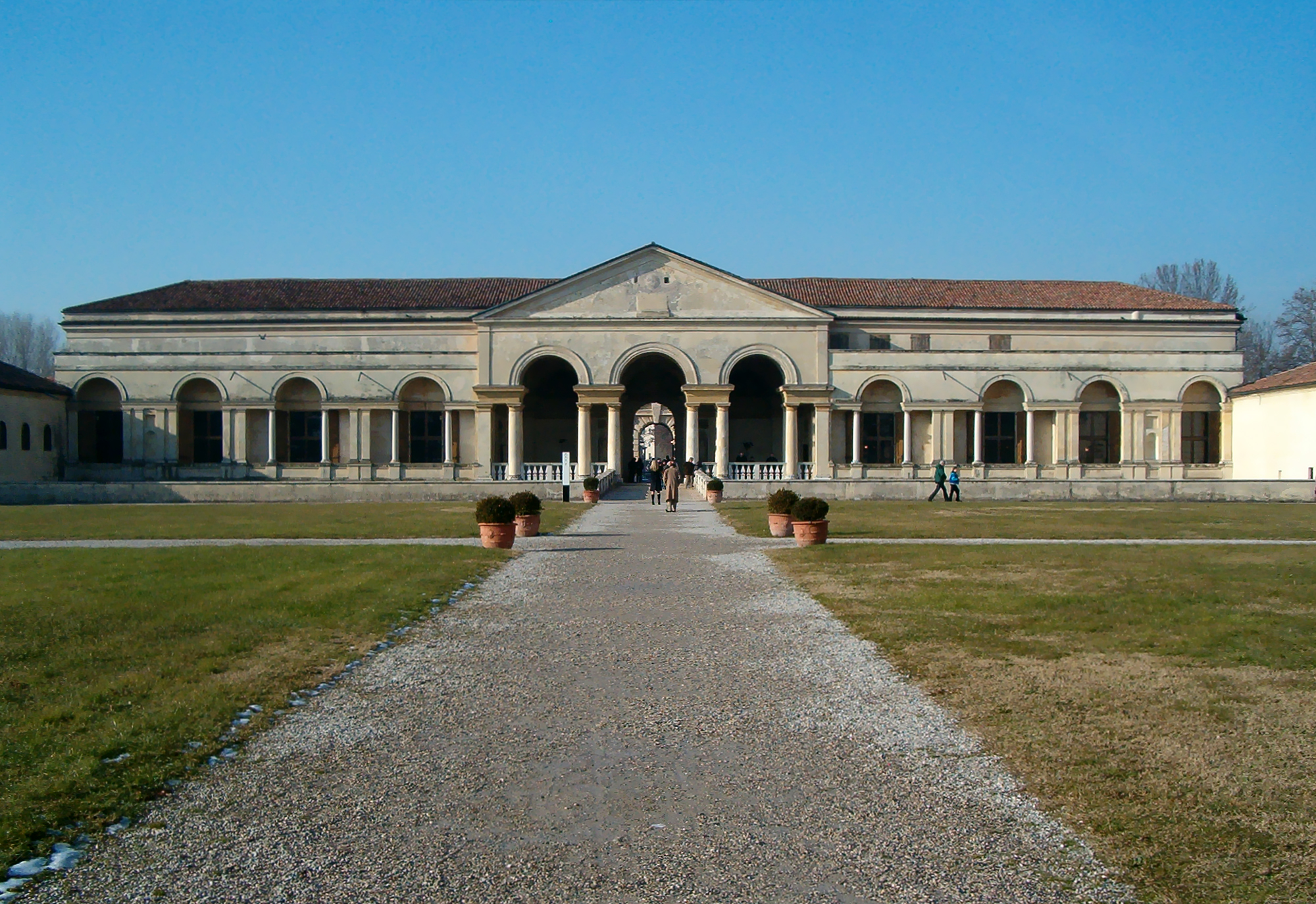
The Palazzo del Te, Mantua, seat of the Gonzaga dynasty who ruled the city from 1530 to 1627. Monteverdi was their court musician from 1590 to 1612.

The first work now generally considered as an opera is Jacopo Peri's Dafne of 1597, closely followed by Euridice (1600), for which Peri and Giulio Caccini wrote separate musical settings. Ottavio Rinuccini was the librettist for both Dafne and Euridice. In the new genre a complete story was told through characters, and in addition to choruses and ensembles, the vocal parts included recitative, aria and arioso. This was a development from various older forms of musical theatre that had existed since the earliest years of the Italian Renaissance; such forms included the maschera ("masque"), the ballo (a dance entertainment, often with sung passages), and particularly the intermedio or intermezzo, a short dramatic musical episode inserted as a prologue or entr'acte between the acts of straight plays. Another format in the later renaissance period was the torneo, or "tournament", a stylised dramatic spectacle in which the main singing was performed by a narrator. Sub-operatic forms of dramatic music continued to thrive as opera itself developed; the blurred boundaries that existed for many years between these forms and "opera" has led to debate about how to categorise some works. For example, the precise genre of Monteverdi's Il combattimento di Tancredi e Clorinda (1624) has proved particularly difficult to define.

Monteverdi's first acknowledged opera is L'Orfeo (1607). He composed, in all, 24 works for the stage. Of these, ten are usually classified as operas, of which the music for seven has been lost apart from a few fragments. (Note: The other theatrical works comprise four intermedi (three lost), seven balli (three lost), two tornei (one lost) and one lost maschera.) Most of what is known about the missing works comes from surviving librettos and other documentation, including Monteverdi's own extensive correspondence. Tim Carter, a leading Monteverdi scholar, suggests that the high rate of loss is explicable because, in Monteverdi's times, "memories were short and large-scale musical works often had limited currency beyond their immediate circumstances".

== For Mantua ==
Monteverdi wrote six acknowledged operas for the Mantua court, of which only L'Orfeo survives with libretto and music intact. Four of the five lost Mantuan works were written after the composer had left the service of the Gonzagas in 1612 and was ensconced in Venice, but still retained contacts with Mantua. L'Arianna and Andromeda were completed and performed; the others were all abandoned incomplete.

=== L'Arianna (1607–08) ===
(English: "Ariadne")

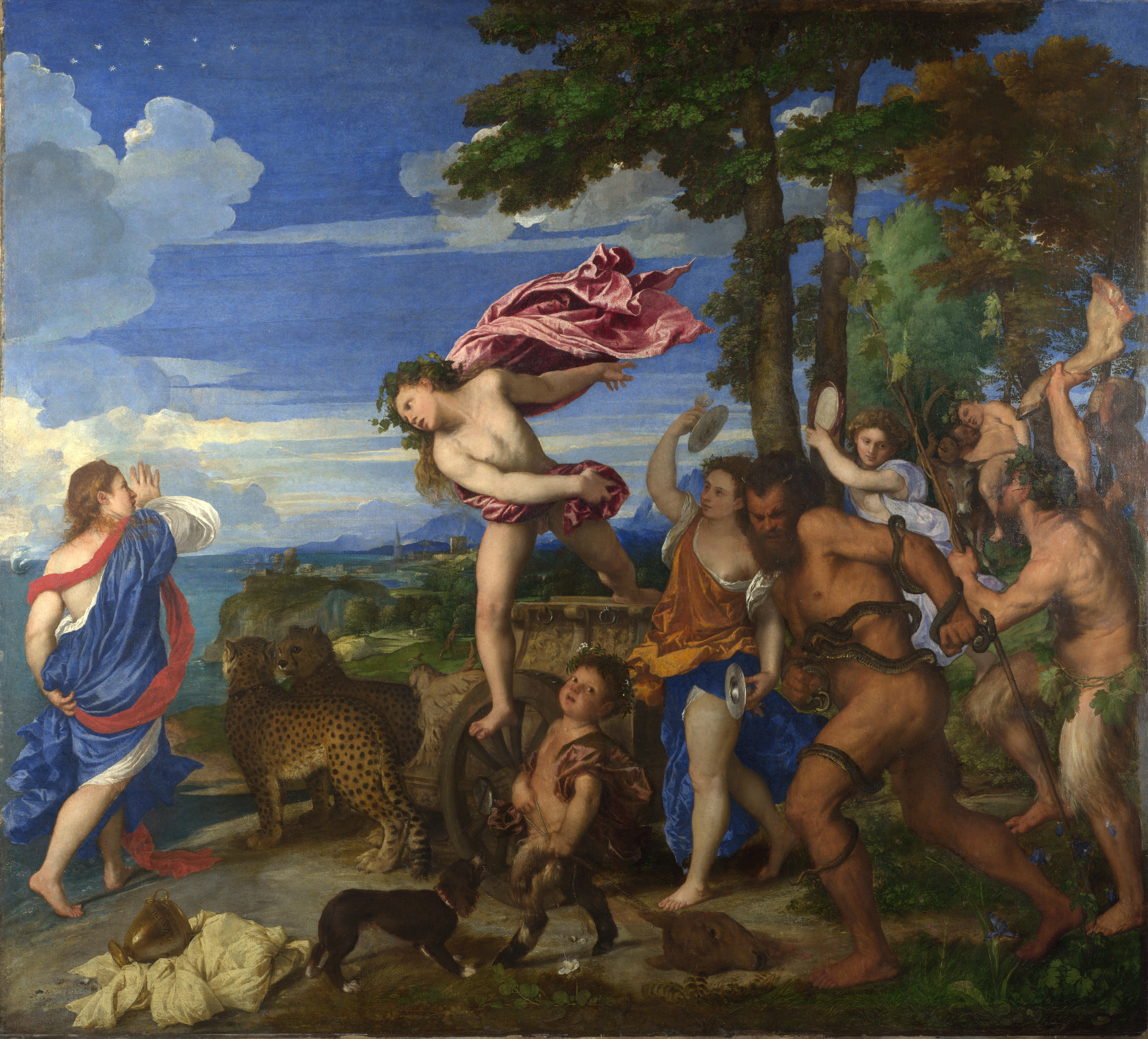
Bacchus and Ariadne, Titian

L'Arianna was composed as a festive piece for the wedding of the heir to the duchy, Francesco Gonzaga, to Margherita of Savoy, in May 1608. Monteverdi received the commission following L'Orfeo's successful premiere at the court in February 1607. The libretto for L'Arianna was by Rinuccini, whose literary skills had earlier impressed Duke Vincenzo I of Mantua after a performance of Euridice. The composition of L'Arianna became a fraught affair for Monteverdi, being only one of three works that the duke required from him for the wedding—he had also to compose a musical prologue for Giovanni Battista Guarini's play L'idropica, and write the music for a dramatic dance, Il ballo delle ingrate. His life had been disrupted by the fatal illness of his wife Claudia; she died on 10 September 1607, but Monteverdi was given no respite by the duke. L'Arianna was largely composed in the last two months of 1607, an exertion that Monteverdi's biographer Hans Redlich describes as "superhuman". Monteverdi felt slighted by the lack of acknowledgement from the duke for his efforts; nearly 20 years later, in a letter to the Mantua court secretary Alessandro Striggio the Younger, he wrote that he had almost killed himself when writing L'Arianna in such a hurry.

Rinuccini used numerous classical sources as the basis for his libretto, in particular works of Ovid—the Heroides and the Metamorphoses—and poems from Catullus. After a prologue, the main action begins as Venus tells Cupid that Ariadne and her lover Theseus, fleeing from Crete after his slaying of the Minotaur, will shortly arrive in Naxos. Theseus, she reports, will then abandon Ariadne, as he believes her to be unacceptable to the people of Athens as their queen. Venus plans to match her instead with the god Bacchus, and asks Cupid to arrange this. Theseus and Arianna arrive; Theseus agonises over his decision to abandon her, but is advised by his counsellor that he is wise in his resolve, and departs. In the morning Ariadne, finding herself abandoned, searches vainly for Theseus on the shore, where she sings her lament. A fanfare indicates an imminent arrival; Ariadne hopes this is Theseus returning, but it is Bacchus and his entourage. Jupiter speaks from the heavens, and amid festive scenes Bacchus promises Ariadne immortality with the gods in return for her love.

Rinuccini extended the libretto during the rehearsals, after complaints from the duchess that the piece was "too dry"; as a result the early scene between Venus and Cupid, and Jupiter's blessing from heaven, were added. Preparations for the opera's performance were disrupted when, in March 1608, the leading soprano Caterina Martinelli died of smallpox. A replacement had to be found rapidly, and the title role fell to Virginia Andreidi, a renowned actress-singer who used the stage name "La Florinda"; she reportedly learned the part in only six days. In his analysis of Monteverdi's theatrical works, Carter suggests that the lament may have been added to the work to make the most of Andreini's acting and vocal abilities. The premiere, on 28 May 1608, was staged in a specially erected temporary theatre, which according to contemporary reports could hold an audience of several thousands. The production was lavish; apparently 300 men were required to manipulate the stage machinery. Federico Follino, who prepared the Mantuan court's official report on the occasion, praised the beauty of the work, the magnificence of costumes and machinery, and the sweetness of the music. Monteverdi's fellow-composer Marco da Gagliano was equally complimentary, writing that the opera had "visibly moved the entire audience to tears." It is possible that L'Arianna was performed in Florence in 1614; a projected performance in Mantua in May 1620 to celebrate Duchess Caterina's birthday was cancelled for unknown reasons. Otherwise, there are no records of the opera's performance before its revival in 1640 at the Teatro San Moisè, Venice. In his study of late Renaissance opera, Gary Tomlinson surmises that the work's enthusiastic reception in Venice was a significant factor in Monteverdi's decision to resume opera composition during his final years.

Of the music, only the lament survives. It was published independently from the opera in various forms; an adaptation for five voices was included in Monteverdi's Sixth Book of Madrigals in 1614, and two versions of the original solo were published in 1623. Other composers emulated the lament's format; Redlich asserts that it initiated a musical subgenre that lasted to the end of the 17th century and beyond. The libretto has been preserved; versions were published in Mantua in 1608, and in Venice in 1622 and 1639.

=== Le nozze di Tetide (1616–17) ===
(English: "The Marriage of Thetis")

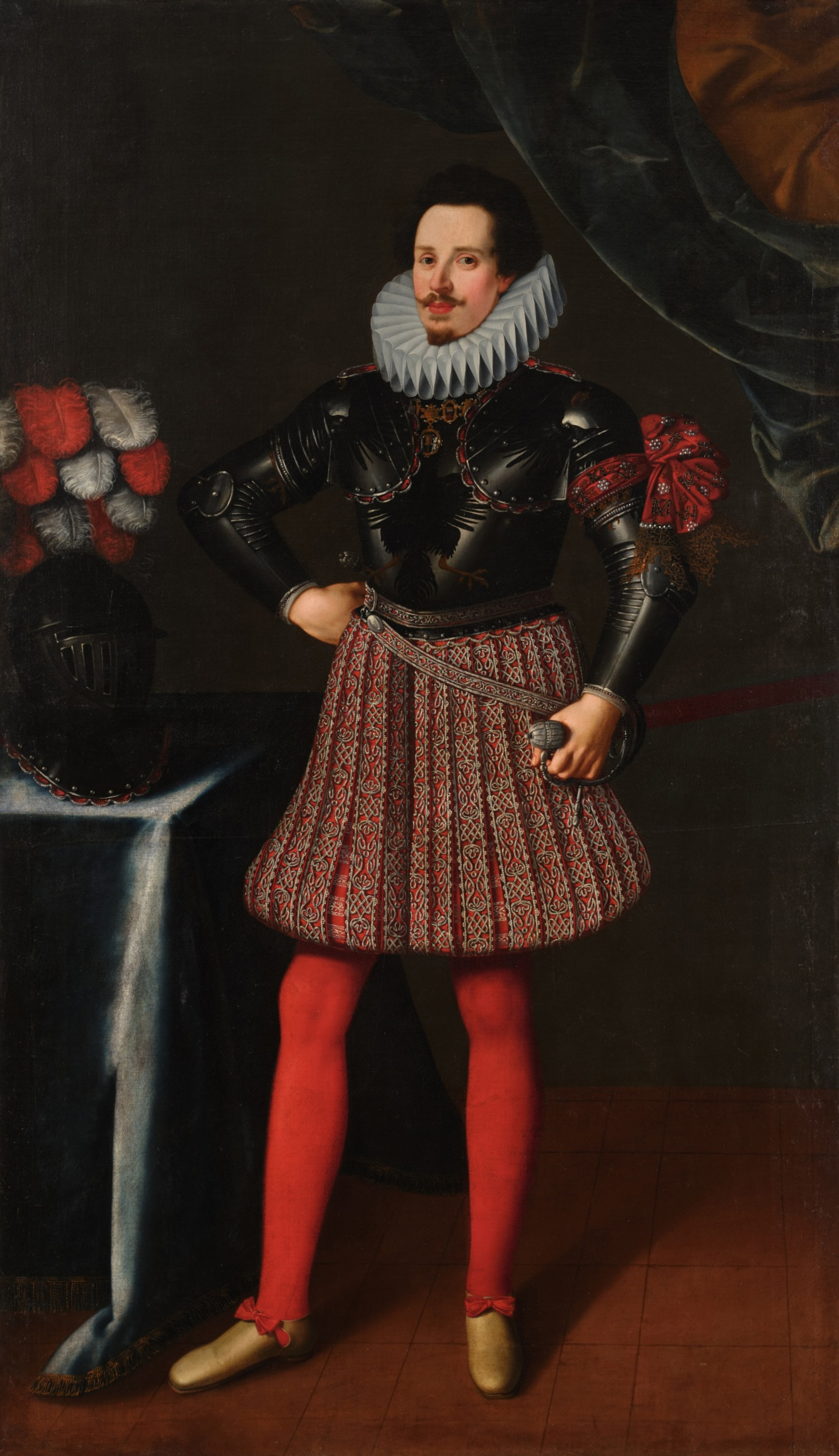
Duke Ferdinando Gonzaga, for whose wedding celebrations in 1617 Le nozze di Tedite was commissioned

After Duke Vincenzo's death in February 1612, Monteverdi found himself out of favour at the Mantuan court. Vincenzo's successor Francesco had no high regard for Monteverdi, and dismissed him from his post. Upon Francesco's sudden death in December 1612, the dukedom passed to his brother Ferdinando, but Monteverdi was not recalled to the court and was appointed maestro di capella in August 1613 at St Mark's, Venice. However, he remained in contact with Striggio and other highly placed Gonzaga courtiers, through whom he was able to secure occasional commissions to compose theatrical works for the Gonzaga court. Thus, late in 1616, Striggio asked him to set to music Scipione Agnelli's libretto Le nozze di Tetide, as part of the celebrations for Duke Ferdinando's forthcoming marriage to Catherine de' Medici. This story, based on the wedding of the mythical Greek hero Peleus to the sea-goddess Thetis, had previously been offered to the Mantuan court by Peri, whose setting of a libretto by Francesco Cini had been rejected in 1608 in favour of L'Arianna.

Initially, Monteverdi had little enthusiasm for Le nozze di Tetide, and sought ways of avoiding or delaying work on it. He would accept the commission, he informed Striggio on 9 December 1616, because it was the wish of the duke, his feudal lord. However, the verses he was given were not, he felt, conducive to beautiful music. He found the tale difficult to understand, and did not think he could be inspired by it. In any event he was occupied for most of December in writing a Christmas Eve mass for St Mark's. On 29 December, perhaps hoping that the commission would be withdrawn, Monteverdi told Striggio that he was ready to begin work on Le Nozze di Tetide "if you tell me to do so". In January 1617, however, he became more enthusiastic on learning that the project had been scaled down and was now being projected as a series of intermedi. (Note: Confusion over the exact genre of this lost work has persisted. Commentators refer to it in a number of ways: as an "opera", an "operatic composition", or favola marittima ("sea story"), the name by which Monteverdi first described it.) He informed Striggio that what he had first considered a rather monotonous piece he now thought fully appropriate to the occasion. He began work on the recitative sections, but before he could start setting the more expressive numbers, the duke had a change of heart and cancelled Monteverdi's commission. Le nozze di Tetide was abandoned; its libretto and whatever music existed have disappeared.

=== Andromeda (1618–20) ===
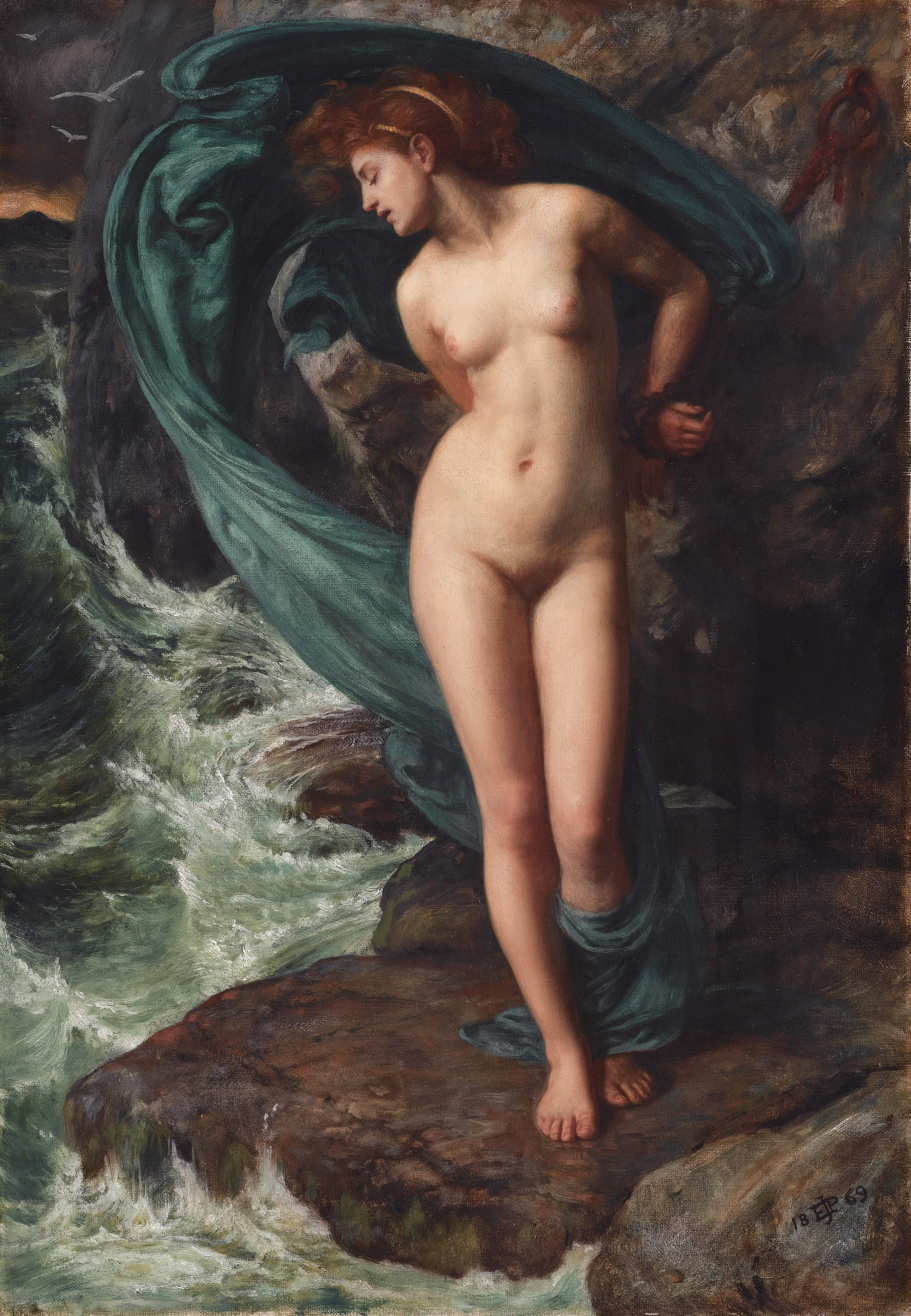
A depiction of Andromeda, chained to a rock in accordance with the ancient Greek myth

Monteverdi's next commission from Mantua came early in 1618, when he was asked to provide the music for Andromeda, an opera based on the ancient Greek myth of the princess chained to a rock. The libretto was written by Duke Ferdinando's chancellor, Ercole Marigliani, and the project was sponsored by the duke's younger brother, Don Vincenzo Gonzaga. It is probable that the work was intended for performance at the Mantua Carnival of March 1618, but as Carter records, Monteverdi's approach to his Mantua commissions was often dilatory and half-hearted; his inability or unwillingness to work on Andromeda delayed its performance, first to 1619 and then to 1620.

Monteverdi's letters during the 1618–20 period, mainly to Striggio but occasionally to Don Vincenzo or Marigliani, offer various excuses for his lack of progress on Andromeda, including his duties at St Mark's, his health, and his obligations to provide ceremonial music for the Doge (ruler) of Venice. In February 1619, Monteverdi had started work on another Mantuan project, a ballo (dance with sung parts) to Striggio's libretto entitled Apollo. On 9 January 1620, still with 400 lines of the Andromeda libretto to set to music, Monteverdi proposed to Striggio that the entire opera project be abandoned and the ballo substituted. This idea was rapidly quashed; Don Vincenzo ordered that the remaining Andromeda music be sent to him forthwith. The final segment of Andromeda, an eight-part song, was delivered to Marigliani on 15 February 1620.

None of Monteverdi's music for Andromeda has survived. The libretto was also thought to have been lost, until its rediscovery in 1984. As was customary in Monteverdi's time, the manuscript makes no mention of the composer's name—librettos were often the subject of numerous settings by different composers. The libretto's frontispiece confirms that Andromeda was performed during Mantua's Carnival, 1–3 March 1620. An analysis of its contents reveals some influence from Rinuccini's libretto for Arianna, such as use of identical metre and length in the prologues of each work, and several common characters in the respective cast lists. The document remains in private hands and has not been published.

Monteverdi recorded no apparent interest in the performance of Andromeda after the 1620 Carnival; the long letter that he wrote to Striggio on 13 March 1620 makes no reference to the event and is chiefly concerned with financial matters. The letter implies that the Gonzaga court was trying to persuade Monteverdi to return to Mantua; in courtly language Monteverdi evades the issue, while comparing the relative generosity of his Venetian employers with the parsimony of the Gonzaga court.

=== Two abortive projects (1627–28) ===
After Andromeda there followed a period of several years in which Mantua made little use of Monteverdi's services. Duke Ferdinando died on 26 October 1626 and was succeeded by Don Vincenzo, who became Duke Vincenzo II. Early in 1627 Striggio approached Monteverdi with a request for theatrical music, possibly for the festivities that would celebrate Vincenzo's accession. Monteverdi replied offering three options: first, Il combattimento di Tancredi e Clorinda ("The Battle of Tancred and Clorinda"), a setting from Torquato Tasso's epic poem Gerusalemme liberata ("Jerusalem Delivered"), which had been performed at the 1624 Venice Carnival; (Note: The music for this work has survived; scholars do not classify it as an opera, although its genre is difficult to establish with certainty.) secondly, a setting from another part of Tasso's poem, covering the story of the sorceress Armida and her abandonment by the Christian hero Rinaldo; finally, he offered to set the words of a new play by Giulio Strozzi, Licori finta pazza inamorata d'Aminta, about a woman who feigns madness for the sake of love. Monteverdi sent Striggio a copy of Strozzi's play on 7 May 1627; Striggio liked it and instructed Monteverdi to begin the music.

==== La finta pazza Licori ====
(English: "The feigned madwoman Licori")

Strozzi was a Venetian, born in 1583, whose literary works included plays and poetry as well as opera libretti; Monteverdi had first met him in 1621. Strozzi knew Monteverdi's music, and had developed a strong appreciation of the composer's innovative style. On 20 June 1627, Monteverdi informed Striggio that Strozzi had expanded and arranged the text into five acts, under the new title La finta pazza Licori. Feigned madness was a standard theme in the commedia dell'arte tradition that had established itself in Italian theatre in the 16th century. In Strozzi's plot, the first known attempt at comic opera, the woman Licori disguises herself initially as a man, then as a woman, and then pretends to be mad, all as part of a strategy to win the heart of her lover, Aminta.

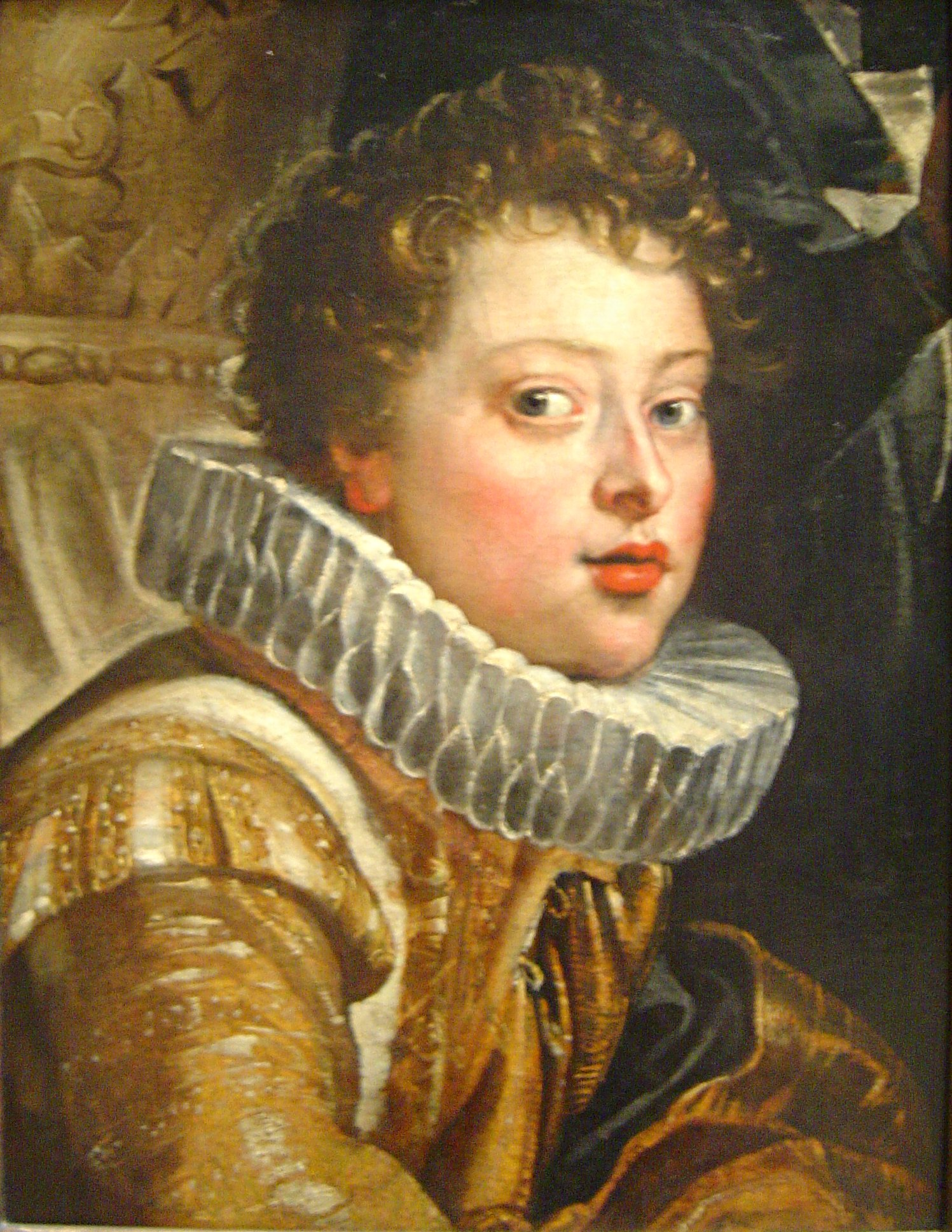
Duke Vincenzo Gonzaga II, whose accession was the likely reason why Licori and Armida were composed

Monteverdi was, at least initially, much taken with the potential of the plot, and the opportunities the libretto provided for a variety of musical effects. Monteverdi stressed to Striggio the importance of finding a singer with real acting ability to play the role of Licori, someone capable of playing a man and a woman with appropriate emotions and gestures. Later he enthused about the chance to write a ballet for each of the five acts, all in different styles. Monteverdi's letters continued throughout the summer, but his attitude slowly changed, from one of evident commitment to frustration at the delays in getting the libretto copied. The musicologist Gary Tomlinson, in his analysis of the opera's genesis, suggests that Monteverdi may have been stalling. In September Striggio, having received, read and presumably not liked the expanded libretto, abruptly cancelled the commission and the work is heard of no more. Monteverdi was told instead to work on the Armida setting.

For many years it was assumed that Monteverdi had written much of the music for Licori before its sudden cancellation; Redlich says the music was finished by 10 September 1627. The work's rejection and subsequent disappearance have been blamed on Striggio's disregard for Monteverdi's efforts. However, Tomlinson's reading of the correspondence suggests a different conclusion: Monteverdi, in his view, "did not even come close to completing the score" and may have written very little of the music. It is likely that he stopped composing at the end of July, having become suspicious of Striggio's true commitment to the work. Tomlinson suggests that, mindful of Mantua's earlier cancellation of Le nozze di Tetide, Monteverdi avoided extending himself on the new project, while maintaining a diplomatic impression of activity. Tomlinson writes: "[I]t would hardly be surprising if Monteverdi were preternaturally sensitive to signs of Mantuan vacillation [and] if, at the first such signs in 1627, he decided to move cautiously in the composition of Licori." Strozzi's libretto has vanished along with whatever music Monteverdi managed to write, but Strozzi wrote a second libretto under the same name, which was set by Francesco Sacrati and produced in Venice in 1641.

==== Armida abbandonata ====
(English: "Armida abandoned")

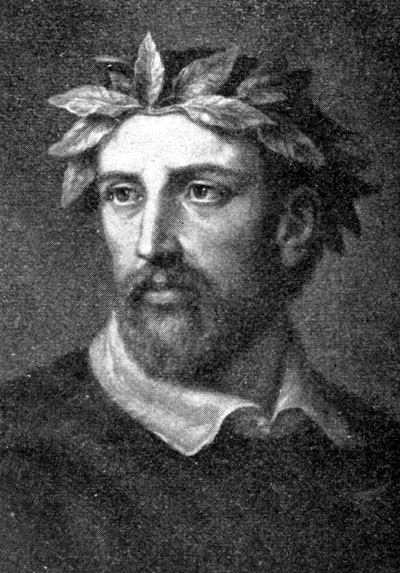
Torquato Tasso, from whose poetic works Monteverdi often found inspiration

After the rejection of Licori, Monteverdi did not immediately turn his attention to Armida. Instead, he went to Parma, having been commissioned to provide musical entertainments for the marriage celebrations of the youthful Duke Odoardo Farnese of Parma and Margherita de' Medici. He spent several weeks in Parma working on these; nevertheless, on 18 December 1627 he was able to tell Striggio that the music for Armida had been completed and was being copied. In the relevant section of Tasso's poem, the enchantress Armida lures the noble Rinaldo to her enchanted island. Two knights arrive to persuade Rinaldo to return to his duty, while Armida pleads with him to stay, or if he must depart, to allow her to be at his side in battle. When he refuses and abandons her, Armida curses him before falling insensible.

Carter indicates several structural similarities to Il combattimento; both works require three voices, one of which acts as the narrator. Despite these similarities, Armida abbandonata, unlike the earlier work, is generally considered by scholars of Monteverdi to be an opera, although Denis Stevens, translator of Monteverdi's letters, has termed it a "parergon" (subsidiary work) to Il Combattimento.

Plans for Armida's performance were, however, cancelled when Duke Vincenzo died at the end of December 1627. On 4 February 1628, Striggio was still asking for a copy of Armida, perhaps to use in connection with the next duke's coronation. Monteverdi promised to send him one, but there is no confirmation that he did so. No trace of the music has been found, though Tomlinson has deduced some of its likely characteristics from Monteverdi's correspondence, including extensive use of the stile concitato effect. Although there is no record that Armida was ever performed in Mantua, Stevens has mooted the possibility that it may have been staged in Venice in 1628, since Monteverdi's reply to Striggio's February letter indicates that the work was in the hands of Girolamo Mocenigo, a wealthy patron of the arts at whose Venetian palace Il combattimento had been performed in 1624.

Licori and Armida were Monteverdi's final theatrical works for the Mantuan court. Vincenzo II's death ended the main Gonzaga line; the dukedom was inherited by a distant relative, Charles of Nevers, and Mantua was subsequently engulfed in a series of conflicts, which by 1630 had reduced much of the city to ruins. Monteverdi's last known letter to Striggio is dated 8 July 1628; Striggio died in Venice on 8 June 1630, while heading a mission requesting aid against the armies that were encircling Mantua.

== For Venice ==
Between 1630 and 1643 Monteverdi wrote four operas for performance in Venice. All were staged in Monteverdi's lifetime, but only Il ritorno d'Ulisse in patria and L'incoronazione di Poppea survive.

=== Proserpina rapita (1630) ===
(English: "The Rape of Proserpine")

Proserpina rapita was the first of the theatrical works that Monteverdi wrote specifically for Venice, under a commission from Mocenigo for his daughter Giustiniana's wedding celebrations. The libretto, by Strozzi, is based on the ancient Greek myth of Pluto and Proserpine. Symbolic rape was a common theme in wedding entertainments designed for Italian courts, intended in Carter's words "both to proclaim the power of love and to set proper bounds on female behaviour".

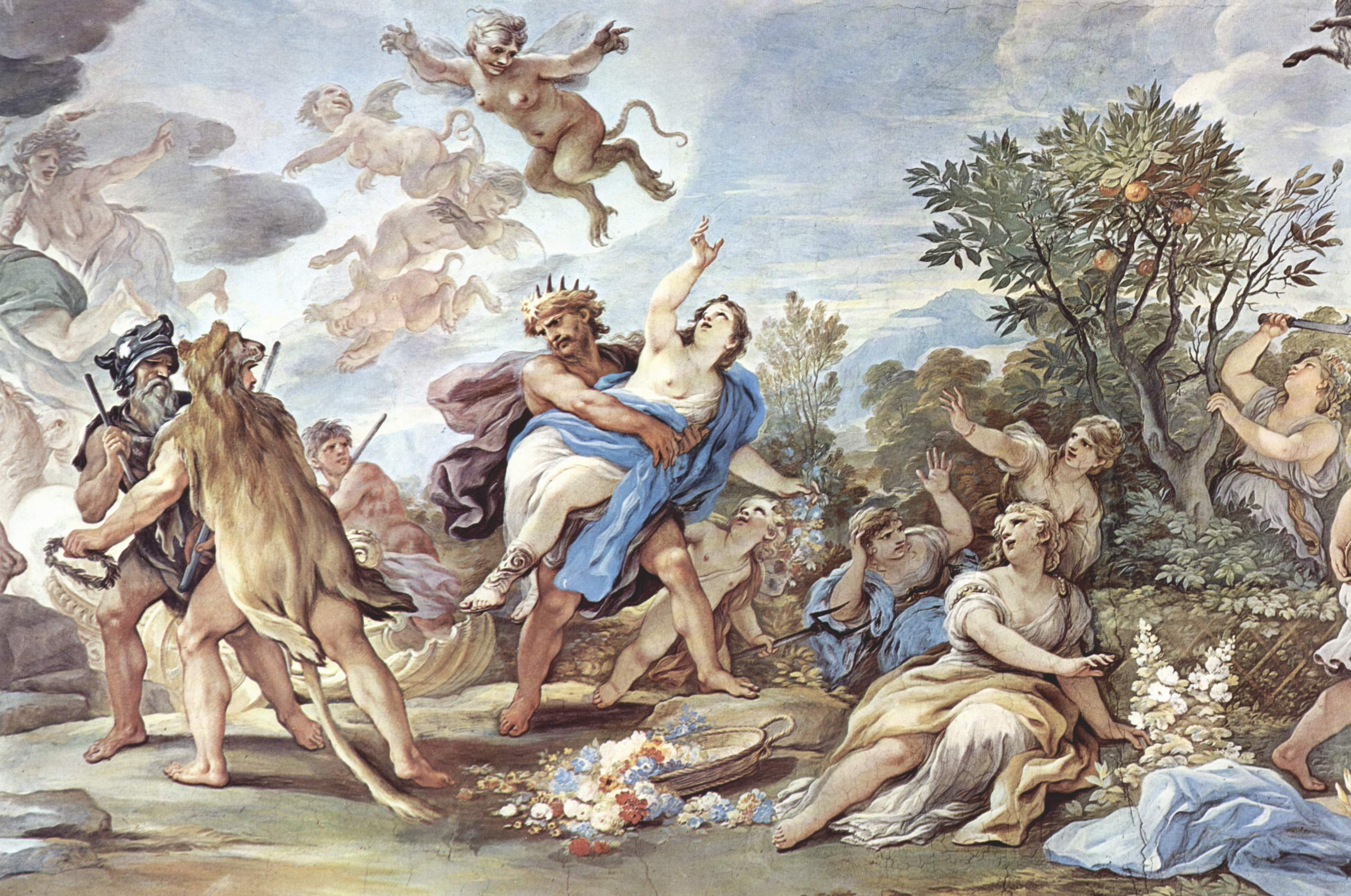
The Rape of Proserpina, Luca Giordano

In Strozzi's version of the story, an amorous shepherd Pachino invokes the aid of Pluto, ruler of the underworld, to cure his unrequited obsession with Proserpine. Pluto obliges by turning Pachino into a mountain, though promising his soul a place in Elysium. After being struck by a love-dart fired by Cupid, Pluto falls for Proserpine and claims her as his queen. Initially she resists him, but when Ciane her protector is turned by Pluto into a spring of water, she is overcome. Submissively, she vows obedience; the strength of her beauty is such that Pluto softens, and pledges that in future he will treat lovers less harshly.

The libretto was published in 1630, in Venice, by Evangelista Deuchino. Surviving copies indicate that the original scenery was created by Giuseppe Albardi, and that dances were arranged by Girolamo Scolari. The opera was staged on 16 April 1630, in a salon of the Mocenigo palace. Carter is sceptical that, in such a restricted venue, the performance could have incorporated all the special effects stipulated by the libretto. Nevertheless, an account by one of those present shows that the occasion provided considerable spectacle: "[I]n the evening with torches there was acted and represented in music ... the Rape of Proserpina with most perfect voices and instruments, with aerial apparitions, scene changes and other things, to the astonishment and wonder of all present."

One small fragment of the music for Proserpina rapita survives, a song for three voices: "Come dolce oggi l'auretta". This was published posthumously in Monteverdi's ninth Madrigal Book (Madrigali e Canzonette a due e tre voci) (1651). (Note: Monteverdi's madrigals were published in "books"; the first, Primo libro de' Madrigali appeared in 1587, and the last in his lifetime, the Eighth Book, in 1638. The ninth book is a miscellany that, as Nigel Fortune comments, includes duets and trios that "are really no longer madrigals at all".) Otherwise, some indication of the musical character of the work is discernible from notes in the libretto, which Fabbri suggests, indicate that the work may not have been sung throughout. The work contained at least two sung balli, one of which concluded the opera with words that provided a thinly disguised tribute to the composer: "Quanto nel chiaro mondo / su verdi arcadi monti / di te si cantari?" ("How much in the clear world / on green Arcadian mountains / will be sung of you?"). More information about the nature of the music and the instrumentation is included in notes within the published libretto.

According to Carter, Proserpina rapita is a transitional work. With its emphasis on dance, and in terms of its subject matter, it represents the courtly traditions of early-17th-century opera. At the same time, in terms of characterisation it looks forward to the "modern" world of Monteverdi's trio of late operas, specifically to L'incoronazione di Poppea. Proserpina's temperament anticipates the character Poppea in the later opera; likewise Pachino may be a forerunner for Ottone, while some of the discourses in Proserpina have the rhetorical flavour of those between Nerone and Seneca in L'incoronazione. Redlich records that in 1644, the year following Monteverdi's death, Proserpina rapita was added to the repertory of Venice's Teatro San Moisè, but he provides no details of performances. A second edition of the libretto was published in Venice in that year.

=== Le nozze d'Enea con Lavinia (1641) ===
(English: "The Marriage of Aeneas to Lavinia")

In the three years before his death in 1643, Monteverdi composed a trilogy of operas for the Venetian opera theatres following the opening in 1637 of the Teatro San Cassiano. Two of these three operas survive in complete, performable versions: Il ritorno d'Ulisse in patria (1640), to a libretto by Giacomo Badoaro, and L'incoronazione di Poppea (1643) for which Giovanni Francesco Busenello provided the text. (Note: L'incoronazione is generally attributed to Monteverdi, but it is recognised by Monteverdi scholars that the music incorporates work by other composers, possibly working under Monteverdi's guidance in the manner of a master painter's workshop. Ringer suggests an analogy with "the workshop of Rubens, who might design a painting and handle the important details himself but leave the more mundane aspects ... to younger apprentice artists.") Between these, Monteverdi composed Le nozze d'Enea con Lavinia; the libretto survives in manuscript form, though no trace of the music has been found. In her analysis of Monteverdi's late works, Ellen Rosand links the three operas together: "[The] ghost opera joins with the two survivors to form a coherent body of works that attests to Monteverdi's position within the world of Venetian opera." The trilogy encompasses a historical trajectory that moves through Troy and the birth of Rome to the decline of the Roman Empire, and points forward to the foundation and ultimate glory of the Venetian Republic. The common theme of the three works is the mythical power of love, at first beneficial but later destructive.

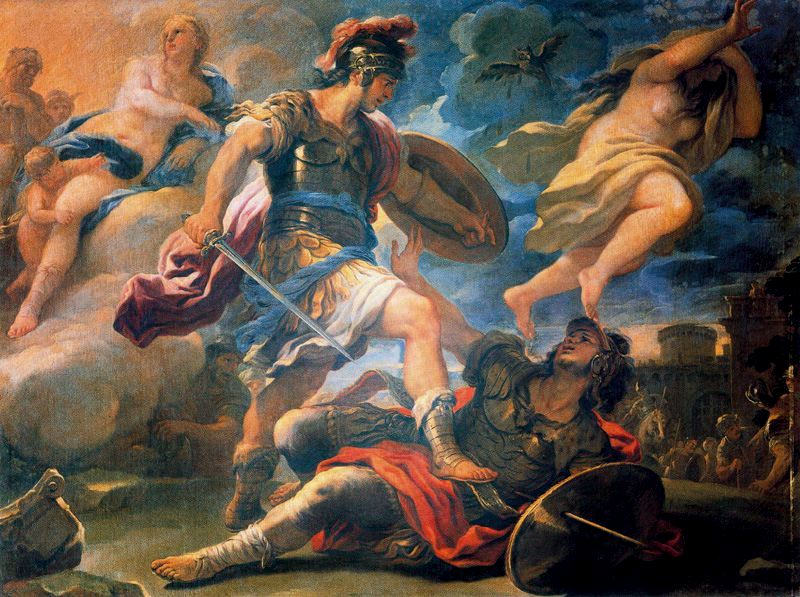
Aeneas and Turnus, Luca Giordano

Because of textual and structural similarities with Ulisse, it was once assumed that Badoaro had written the Le nozze libretto. However, Rosand's researches reveal the librettist to be a close friend of Badoaro's, Michelangelo Torcigliani. In a lengthy preface Torcigliani introduces his story, taken from Virgil's epic Aeneid, as a tragedia di lieto fine (tragedy with a happy ending). He acknowledges numerous departures from the original, including the introduction of a comic character, "Numanus". This was done, he admitted, because "Iro", an analogous character type in Ulisse, had proved popular with theatregoers. The text had been written to meet Monteverdi's requirements for emotional variety, thus enabling him, said Torcigliani, to demonstrate the full range of his musical genius.

The principal theme of the story is the desire by Juno, who is feuding with Aeneas's mother Venus to prevent the marriage of the Trojan Aeneas to Lavinia, daughter of King Latino of Latium. She uses an evil spirit to provoke disharmony between Trojans and Latins; when a Trojan hunting party first wounds a deer and then kills a Latin shepherd, Elminio, there are calls for war, which Latino rejects. Aeneas, resting by the River Tiber, is unaware of these troubling incidents, though he is warned by the spirit of the river. Danger arrives in the person of Turnus, King of the Rutuli, an ally of the Latins whose love Lavinia has rejected. Spurred on by Turnus's clamour for war, Trojans and Latins fight, and Aeneas kills Turnus. Latino invites Aeneas to take the hand of Lavinia, who is delighted to accept him. In the light of Aeneas's bravery, Juno forgets her former enmity, and joins with Venus and Hymen to bless the marriage. The opera ends with predictions of the greatness of Rome and the distant future glories of Venice.

Le nozze d'Enea con Lavinia was performed during the Venice Carnival of 1640–41, at the Teatro Santi Giovanni e Paolo where it alternated with a revival of Ulisse. According to Carter the work was fairly undemanding in terms of its staging, the action taking place mainly on the banks of the Tiber with few changes of set. There is no record of the Venetian public's response to the opera that, Rosand asserts, was clearly aimed at their patriotic impulses, with its final scene a celebration of "the birth and marvels of the city of Venice". In a preface published with the libretto, Torcigliani refers to "the sweetness of the music of the never-enough praised Monteverde", but the libretto itself provides no specific guides to the music's nature. Ringer records with regret that "[t]he words are all that remain of this Virgilian opera, offering faint hints of lost melodies".

== Consequences ==
Many of Monteverdi's lost works date from the 1610s and 1620s, and the manuscripts may have disappeared in the wars that overcame Mantua in 1630. Carter cites as a significant aspect of their loss the degree to which they might have provided musical links between the composer's early Mantuan court operas and the public operas he wrote in Venice towards the end of his life: "Without these links ... it is hard to a produce a coherent account of his development as a composer for the stage". In an essay on the opera orchestras of Monteverdi's day, Janet Beat regrets that the 30-year gap between L'Orfeo and the next Monteverdi opera to have survived, Il ritorno d'Ulisse in patria, hampers the study of how opera orchestration developed during those critical years.

Carter also reflects on the intriguing possibility, however remote, that a discovery in an unexplored library might one day bring some of this missing music to light. As of 2022 this has not occurred; however, a setting of Rinuccini's libretto by the British composer Alexander Goehr was performed at London's Royal Opera House on 15 September 1995, under the title Arianna. Goehr worked from Rinuccini's original script and, as a tribute to the historic opera, incorporated sections of Monteverdi's setting of the lament into his score.
