= 1654 in poetry =

This article covers 1654 in poetry. Nationality words link to articles with information on the nation's poetry or literature (for instance, Irish or France).

== Works published ==
- Robert Aylet, Divine, and Moral Speculations in Metrical Numbers, Upon Various Subjects, including previously published verses along with "The Song of Songs" and "The Brides Ornaments", apparently published in this book for the first time
- John Playford, A Breefe Introduction to the Skills of Musick for Song & Violl, verse and music
- The Harmonie of the Muses; Or, The Gentlemans and Ladies Choisest Recreation, an anthology from nine contributors; includes several by John Donne, "Elegy XVII" (here titled "Loves Progress by Dr Don) and "Elegy XIX: To His Mistress Going to Bed" (here titled "An Elegie made by J.D."), as well as Donne's "A Valediction: forbidding Mourning", "Loves Diet", "The Prohibition" and "The Will", with other poems also attributed to "J.D.", "Dr. Don" or "Dr. Joh. Don"

== Births ==
Death years link to the corresponding "[year] in poetry" article:

- January 20 – Michiel de Swaen (died 1707), Dutch surgeon, rhetorician and poet
- January 22 – Sir Richard Blackmore (died 1729), English poet and physician
- November 27 – Friedrich von Canitz (died 1699), German poet and diplomat

== Deaths ==
Birth years link to the corresponding "[year] in poetry" article:

- February 8 – Jean-Louis Guez de Balzac (born 1597), French writer and poet writing verses in both French and Latin
- May – Germain Habert (born 1615), French churchman and poet
- June 27 – Johannes Valentinus Andreae (born 1586), German Rosicrucian
- November 30 – William Habington (born 1605), English poet
- December 5 – Jean François Sarrazin (born 1611), French satirist and poet
- Also:
  - Giacomo Badoaro (born 1602), Venetian nobleman and poet
  - Alexander Ross (born 1591), Scottish poet, author and controversialist

== See also ==
- Poetry
- 17th century in poetry
- 17th century in literature
