= Elegy XIX: To His Mistress Going to Bed =

Poem written by John Donne

"Elegy XIX: To His Mistress Going to Bed", originally spelled "To His Mistris Going to Bed", is a poem written by the metaphysical poet John Donne.

The elegy was refused a licence for publishing in Donne's posthumous collection Poems in 1633, but was printed in an anthology, The Harmony of the Muses, in 1654. The poem is classified as one of Donne's love poems, "marked by an energetic, often bawdy wit, a new explicitness about sexual desire and experience, and an irreverent new attitude towards authority figures". Several poetic conventions, such as the blason, metaphysical conceit, neoplatonism and allusion are used by Donne in this work.

== Summary ==
Throughout the poem, Donne's male speaker urges his mistress into bed. Donne's speaker fervently describes undressing and caressing his mistress, and at the end, the speaker reveals that he is fully unclothed and erect. The process of disrobing is followed from top to toe, centred on the belly and vulva, and each stage compares the beauty of dress as external decoration with the natural beauty of the undressed woman.

== Poetic conventions ==
Donne's poem reinvents Petrarchan poetic conventions, which figured around the despair and heartache brought about by unattainable love. Donne's "Elegy XIX" was also influenced by Ovid's "Elegies", in which Ovid used wit and detachment in describing the male lover's aggressive pursuit of women." By combining Petrarch's technique of "wooing from afar" with Ovid's sexually aggressive language and style, Donne creates a parody of the conventional love sonnet, and an early specimen of libertine poetry.

=== Blazon ===
Ironically, Donne's speaker uses a blazon, or a record of virtues and excellencies to describe his mistress disrobing (Lines 5–18). While standard Petrarchan blazons were used to list a woman's honourable attributes, such as her beauty or chasteness, Donne's poem "removes [the] woman from the pedestal on which she had been adored", placing an erotic emphasis on an otherwise virtuous list. Instead of speaking of his mistress's virtues, Donne's speaker focuses solely on her appearance, which demonstrates that the speaker is looking for a coital experience with love.

=== Allusion ===
The poem is peppered with metaphorical allusion, used to further describe sexual imagery. In Line 21, Donne refers to "Mahomets Paradice", which was peopled with beautiful women ready to satisfy the carnal desires of the male inhabitants. Similarly, Donne mentions that "Gems which you women use/Are like Atalanta's balls, cast in men's views" (35–6); in Greek mythology, Atalanta rejected all suitors who could not defeat her in a race; Hippomenes eventually defeated her by dropping apples along the race trail, which Atalanta stopped to pick up. Donne's connection between religious allusion and eroticism creates a paradox, which suggests that Donne sees physical love as being just as necessary as love for the divine.

=== Erotic imagery and metaphor ===
"Elegy XIX" is full of erotic imagery, which complements Donne's adaptation of Ovidian wit. In the blazon, Donne's speaker orders, "Off with that happy busk, which I envy" (11); Donne's speaker uses the busk as a metaphor of the phallus, although it is unclear whether or not the speaker envies the busk because of its proportions, or because it is close to the mistress's body. Donne's speaker asks his mistress to "Shew/The haiery Diademe which on you doth grow" (15–6), or otherwise, let her hair down, which creates an image of freedom and relaxedness within the bedroom setting (it is also used later in Thomas Carew's "A Rapture").

Donne's metaphysical conceit occurs at line 27; "O my America! my new-found-land/My kingdome, safeliest when with one man man’d/My Myne of precious stones, My Emperie/How blest am I in this discovering thee!" (27–30). K. W. Gransden sees this excerpt as an “analogy from Elizabethan navigation and discovery, by which means he [the speaker] depicts the lover's journey to consummation in the most modern possible fashion. Donne neatly hits the traditional estimate of love by expressing it in terms of an adventure”. Here, Gransden commends Donne's comparison of sexual intercourse to an adventure, which was a modern way for his speaker to coax the mistress into bed. Donne's metaphysical conceit also dabbles in gendered power dynamics of early modern England. Ilona Bell suggests that "If the woman is [the speaker's] kingdom and his empire, he is her king and emperor, reveling unabashedly in his masculine dominion over her”, which suggests that Donne's speaker takes a position of superiority and governance over his mistress. However, without the "new-found-land", AKA the mistress, Donne's speaker would not be a king. As much as the mistress needs the speaker, the speaker needs the mistress. This is also reverent in the last lines of the poem, "To teach thee, I am naked first, why then/What needst thou have more covering then a man?" (47–8); Donne's speaker removes his clothes to guide, or teach, his mistress; however, since he is naked first, he places himself in a place of vulnerability. Bell notes that "male domination [was] fundamental to Donne's poetic and cultural inheritance. Not surprisingly, therefore, Donne's poems acknowledge the sexual stereotypes and gender hierarchy that subordinated early modern women to men...; however, his poems also dramatise the ways in which Donne challenged... the patriarchal polity and society into which [he was] born and died”. By supplying the reader with a metaphysical conceit that places the speaker over his mistress, but in a way that obviously shows his dependence on her, as well as providing an open-ended scenario where the man is either guiding his mistress into nudity or left vulnerable as she remains clothed, Bell's theory is supported.

=== Neoplatonism ===
Although the elegy is not Donne's most credible neoplatonic work, there is one instance where transcendent love is mentioned. Donne's speaker mentions that "As souls unbodied, bodies uncloth'd must be" (34), which suggests that the spiritual connection of two souls outside of the body, or a Neoplatonic love, is just as crucial and necessary to a relationship as physical, erotic love.

== See also ==
- 1654 in poetry
