= Michelangelo Torcigliani =

Italian poet (1618–1679)

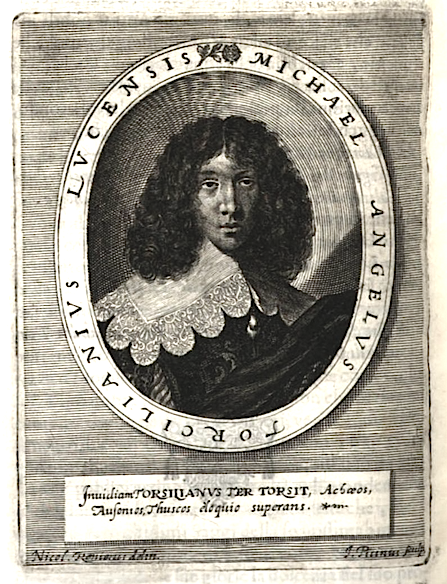
- Portrait of Michelangelo Torcigliani. From the book "Le glorie degli Incogniti", 1647
- Born: March 1618; Lucca, Republic of Lucca
- Died: 25 November 1679 (aged 61); Venice, Republic of Venice
- Occupations: Poet; Writer; Librettist
- Parent(s): Giuliano Torcigliani and Apollonia Torcigliani (née Morastrelli)
- Writing career
- Language: Latin; Italian language
- Period: 17th century; Baroque literature
- Genres: Poetry; translation; libretto
- Notable work: Echo cortese
- Literary movement: Baroque; Marinism

Michelangelo Torcigliani (March 1618 – 25 November 1679) was an Italian Baroque poet from Lucca.

== Biography ==
Michelangelo Torcigliani was born in Lucca in March 1618. He received his early education at the prestigious college of San Girolamo, under the guidance of the well-known humanists Guido Vannini, translator of Tasso's Jerusalem Delivered in Latin hexameters, and Giuseppe Laurenzi. He continued his studies in Rome, where he remained until 1636. When conflicts developed between Lucca and the Church he moved to Venice, where he became a member of the Accademia degli Incogniti and befriended the poets Giovanni Francesco Loredan, Leonardo Quirini and Pietro Michiel. Torcigliani died in Venice, November 25, 1679.

Torcigliani played an important role in the history of Baroque opera. He is considered by critics the librettist of Monteverdi’s lost opera Le nozze d’Enea con Lavinia (The Marriage of Aeneas to Lavinia). The work was performed at the Teatro Santi Giovanni e Paolo in 1641. Torcigliani is also the dedicatee of the opera L'Ulisse errante (1644) written by the poet Giacomo Badoaro. He was a friend and correspondent of several of the most distinguished Italian men of letters of the day, including Agostino Mascardi, Angelico Aprosio, Francesco Pona, Giovanni Francesco Loredan and Guido Casoni. Leonardo Quirini dedicated to him his poetry collection I vezzi d'Erato.

== Works ==
After his death Torcigliani's works appeared under the title Echo Cortese, at Lucca, published by the Marescandoli, in three parts, the first in 1680, the second in 1681, and the third in 1683. He is best known for his Italian translations of ancient Greek and Latin authors, and his two verse dialogues on natural science, L'astronomia and La chimica. His translations into Italian verse of the Song of Songs (in the second vol.), of the Attis of Catullus, of a certain number of Anacreontea, and of several Greek epigrams are particularly praiseworthy.

== Bibliography ==
- «Michel Angelo Torcigliani Lucchese». In : Le glorie de gli Incogniti: o vero, Gli huomini illustri dell'Accademia de' signori Incogniti di Venetia, In Venetia : appresso Francesco Valuasense stampator dell'Accademia, 1647, pp. 336–339 (on-line).
- Hutton, James (1935). The Greek Anthology in Italy to the Year 1800. Ithaca: Cornell University Press. p. 365.
- Taddeo, Edoardo (1993). "La cetra e l'arpa. studio su Michelangelo Torcigliani". Studi Secenteschi. 34 (3): 3–60.
- Taddeo, Edoardo (1999). "Torcigliani e Delfino, Patriarca atomista". Studi Secenteschi. 40 (83): 83–95.
- Slawinski, M. (2002). "Torcigliani, Michelangelo". The Oxford Companion to Italian Literature. Oxford University Press. ISBN 978-0-19-818332-7.
- Michelassi, Nicola (2007). "Michelangelo Torcigliani è l'incognito autore delle Nozze di Enea con Lavinia". Studi secenteschi. XLVIII: 381–386.
- Rosand, Ellen (2007). Monteverdi's Last Operas: A Venetian Trilogy. University of California Press. ISBN 978-0520933279.
- Rossini, Francesco (2019). "TORCIGLIANI, Michelangelo". Dizionario Biografico degli Italiani (in Italian). Vol. 96: Toja–Trivelli. Rome: Istituto dell'Enciclopedia Italiana. pp. 220–223. ISBN 978-88-12-00032-6.
- Carminati, Clizia (2020). "Le corrispondenze letterarie del Cinquecento e del Seicento: Metodi e iniziative di studio: Con osservazioni sull'"Echo cortese" di Michelangelo Torcigliani". MEFRIM: Mélanges de l'École française de Rome: Italie et Méditerranée modernes et contemporaines. 132 (2): 339–353. doi:10.1400/291204.
- Rossini, Francesco (2024). Giovan Battista Marino, Michelangelo Torcigliani e l'inedito Adone ridotto in otto canti. I libri di Emil. ISBN 978-88-6680-503-8.
