= Robert Huntley Bell =

American academic (born 1946)

Robert Huntley Bell (born 21 February 1946) is a nationally recognized American teacher and scholar known for his work on James Joyce, Shakespeare, eighteenth-century literature, comedy, and satire. Retired in 2018, Bell is professor emeritus of Williams College, and lives in Williamstown, MA with his wife Ilona Bell. They have two daughters and four grandchildren.

== Early life and education ==
Born in Cambridge, Massachusetts in 1946, Bell was graduated from Belmont Hill School in 1963 and from Dartmouth College in 1967. He was a Dartmouth Senior Fellow, magna cum laude, Phi Beta Kappa, and awarded a Woodrow Wilson National Fellowship and a Danforth Foundation Fellowship for graduate study. He received his Ph.D. from Harvard University in 1972 and joined the English Department of Williams College.

== Career ==
Bell won the 1998 Robert Foster Cherry Award for Great Teachers and the Carnegie Foundation Outstanding College Professor of the Year 2004. He was also named Exemplary Teacher, American Association of Higher Education in 1994. As William R. Kenan, Jr. Professor of English from 1994 to 2004, Bell was the founding director of the Project for Effective Teaching (PET) and mentored a decade of new faculty at Williams College. His scholarship was supported by National Endowment for the Humanities Fellowships, 1989 and 1993. From 1981-85, he was editor-in-chief of the Berkshire Review and 1996-1998, he hosted The Book Show on Northeast Public Radio. His humor pieces appeared in Commonweal, Harvard Magazine, The Berkshire Eagle, and other magazines, and were broadcast on Northeast Public Radio and National Public Radio. He retired from Williams in 2018 as Frederick Latimer Wells Professor of English.

== Selected Publications ==
=== Books ===
- Bell, Robert H. Jocoserious Joyce: the fate of folly in Ulysses. Cornell University Press, 1991. ISBN 978-0-8014-2509-7.
- Bell, Robert H. Critical essays on Kingsley Amis. G.K. Hall: Simon and Schuster Macmillan, 1998. ISBN 978-0-7838-0039-4.
- Bell, Robert (with William Dowling). A Reader’s Companion to Infinite Jest. Xlibris, 2005. ISBN 9781413484465.
- Bell, Robert H. Shakespeare's great stage of fools. Palgrave Macmillan, 2013. ISBN 978-1-137-34675-9.
- Bell, Robert H. The Rise of Autobiography in the Eighteenth-Century. Edwin Mellen Press, 2012. ISBN 9780779905188.

=== Articles ===
- Bell, Robert H. "Preparatory to anything else: Introduction to Joyce's Hades." Journal of Modern Literature 24 (2001): 363-499. Project MUSE, https://dx.doi.org/10.1353/jml.2001.0001.
- Bell, Robert H. "Metamorphoses of Spiritual Autobiography." English Literary History 44 (1977): 108–126. doi:10.2307/2872529. ISSN 0013-8304.
- Bell, Robert H. "Blushing like the morn: Milton's Human Comedy." Milton Quarterly 15 (1981): 47–55. ISSN 0026-4326.
- Bell, Robert H. "Bertrand Russell and the Eliots." The American Scholar 52 (1983): 309–325. ISSN 0003-0937.
- Bell, Robert H. "Confession and Concealment in The Autobiography of Bertrand Russell." Biography 8 (1985): 318-335. Project MUSE, https://dx.doi.org/10.1353/bio.2010.0444.
- Bell, Robert H. "On Becoming a Teacher of Teachers." Harvard Educational Review 69 (1999): 447-456. doi:10.17763/haer.69.4.6x47362636342683. ISSN 0017-8055.
- Bell, Robert H. "Sterne's Anatomy of Folly." Literary Imagination 3 (2001): 21–41. https://doi.org/10.1093/litimag/3.1.21.
- Bell, Robert H. "Double Dylan." Popular Music and Society 24 (2000): 109–126. https://doi.org/10.1080/03007760008591770.
- Bell, Robert H. “Rereading Orson Welles’s Chimes at Midnight.” Southwest Review 89 (2005): 566-574.
- Bell, Robert H. “Inside the Wardrobe: Is 'Narnia' a Christian Allegory?” Commonweal 132 (2005): 12-14.
- Bell, Robert H. “Robert Frost, Symbolical Teacher.” In The Best Kind of College: An Insiders' Guide to America's Small Liberal Arts Colleges. State University of New York Press, 2015: 91-106. https://www.jstor.org/stable/jj.18254125.12.
- Bell, Robert H. “William James: The Memory of Glory and the Work of Mourning.” In The Civil War in Art and Memory. Yale University Press, Studies in the History of Art 81, Symposium Papers LVIII (2016): 227-243. Published by: National Gallery of Art, https://www.jstor.org/stable/45112961.
