= Ilona Bell =

American academic

;

Ilona Isaacson Bell is an American academic.

She taught at Williams College as Samuel Fessenden Clarke Professor of English and is married to Robert Huntley Bell. She graduated from Harvard University in 1969.

== Selected Publications ==
=== Books and Editions ===
- Bell, Ilona. Mary Wroth: Pamphilia to Amphilanthus in Manuscript and Print. Edited with an introduction. Toronto: Iter Press, 2017; ACMRS, 2017. ISBN 978-0866985796.
- Bell, Ilona. John Donne: Collected Poetry. Edited with an introduction. Penguin Press, 2012. ISBN 978-0141191577.
- Bell, Ilona. Elizabeth I: the Voice of a Monarch. Palgrave, 2010. ISBN 978-0230621053.
- Bell, Ilona. John Donne: Selected Poems. Edited with an introduction. Penguin Press, 2006. ISBN 978-0140424409.
- Bell, Ilona. Elizabethan Women and the Poetry of Courtship. Cambridge University Press, 1998. ISBN 978-0521158725.

=== Book Chapters and Articles ===
- Bell, Ilona. “‘Joye doth move’”: The Aubade and Wroth’s Dialogic Poetics.” Sidney Journal 43 (2025): 61-82.
- Bell, Ilona. “‘Reading Might Make Her Know’: Sidney’s Correspondence and Astrophil and Stella.” Sidney Journal 40 (2022): 33-56.
- Bell, Ilona. “‘Drunk with Delight of Change’—the Play of Energeia in Wroth’s Pamphilia to Amphilanthus, ' Sidney Journal 38 (2020): 83-105.
- Bell, Ilona. “‘Dare love that, and say so too’: Orality and Performance in Donne’s Lyric Poetry.” John Donne in Context. Ed. Michael Schoenfeldt. Cambridge University Press, 2019. ISBN 978-1107043503.
- Bell, Ilona. “‘Sugared Sonnets Among Their Private Friends’: Mary Wroth and William Shakespeare.” Mary Wroth and Shakespeare. Ed. Paul Salzman and Marion Wynne-Davies. Routledge, 2015. 9-24. ISBN 978-1138783034.
- Bell, Ilona. “The Circulation of Writings by Lady Mary Wroth.” The Ashgate Research Companion to the Sidneys, 1500-1700, vol 2. Ed. Margaret P. Hannay, Mary Ellen Lamb and Michael G. Brennan. Ashgate, 2015. 77-85. ISBN 978-1409450405.
- Bell, Ilona. “The Autograph Manuscript of Mary Wroth’s Pamphilia to Amphianthus.” Re-Reading Mary Wroth. Ed. Katherine R. Larson and Naomi J. Miller with Andrew Strycharski. Palgrave Macmillan, 2015. 171-28. ISBN 978-1349502479.
- Bell, Ilona. “‘A too curious secrecie’: Wroth’s Pastoral Song and Urania.” Sidney Journal 31 (2013): 23-50.
- Bell, Ilona. “‘Joy’s Sports’: the Unexpurgated Text of Mary Wroth’s Pamphilia to Amphilanthus.” Modern Philology 111 (2013): 231-52.
- Bell, Ilona. “Mirror Tropes and Renaissance Poetry.” Renaissance Tropologies: The Cultural Imagination of Early Modern England. Ed. Jeanne Shami. Duquesne University Press, 2008. 229-53. ISBN 978-0820704098.
- Bell, Ilona. “Private Lyrics in Elizabeth Cary’s Tragedy of Mariam.” The Literary Career and Legacy of Elizabeth Cary, 1613-1680. Ed. Heather Wolfe. Palgrave Macmillan, 2007. 17-34. ISBN 978-1403970169.
- Bell, Ilona. “Rethinking Shakespeare’s Dark Lady.” A Companion to Shakespeare’s Sonnets. Ed. Michael Schoenfeldt. Blackwell, 2007. 293-313. ISBN 978-1405121552.
- Bell, Ilona. “Gender Matters: The Women in Donne’s Poems.” A Cambridge Companion to Donne. Ed. Achsah Guibbory. Cambridge University Press, 2006. 201-216. ISBN 978-1405121552.
- Bell, Ilona. “Shakespeare’s Exculpatory Complaint.” Critical Essays on Shakespeare's A Lover's Complaint.’' Ashgate Publishing, 2006. 91-107. ISBN 978-0754603450.
- Bell, Ilona. “‘A Lover’s Complaint.’” The Greenwood Companion to Shakespeare. Vol. 4. Greenwood, 2005. 1193-1213. ISBN 978-0313327889
- Bell, Ilona. “Elizabeth Tudor—Poet.” Explorations in Renaissance Culture 30 (2004): 1-22. Rpt. Elizabeth I and Her Age: A Norton Critical Edition. Ed. Donald V. Stump and Susan M. Felch. W. W. Norton & Co., 2008. 712-28. ISBN 978-0393928228.
- Bell, Ilona. “Elizabeth and the Politics of Elizabethan Courtship.” Elizabeth I: Always Her Own Free Woman. Ed. Carole Levin, Jo Eldridge Carney, and Debra Barrett-Graves. 45-57. Ashgate Publishing, 2003. 179-91. ISBN 978-0754607977.
- Bell, Ilona. “Betrothal: ‘The good-morrow.’” John Donne Journal 22 (2003): 23-30.
- Bell, Ilona. “A Letter sent by the Maydens of London--In Defense of their Lawful Liberty.” Women, Writing, and the Reproduction of Culture in Tudor and Stuart Britain. Ed. Mary E. Burke, Jane Donawerth, Linda L. Dove, and Karen Nelson. Syracuse University Press, 2000. 177-92. ISBN 978-0815628156.
- Bell, Ilona. “Courting Anne More.” John Donne Journal 19 (2000): 59-86.
- Bell, Ilona. “‘Sovereainge Lord and Lordly Lady of this Land’: Elizabeth I, Stubbs, and the Gaping Gulf.” Dissing Elizabeth: Negative Representations of Gloriana. Ed. Julia M. Walker. Duke University Press, 1998. 99-117. ISBN 978-0822320609.
- Bell, Ilona. “‘A Lover's Complaint’--A Conclusion to Shakespeare's Sonnets.” Shakespeare's Sonnets: Critical Essays. Ed. James Schiffer. Garland, 1999. 455-74. ISBN 978-0815323655.
- Bell, Ilona. “Elizabethan Love Poetry and the Female Lyric Audience.” Representing Women in Renaissance England. Ed. Claude J. Summers and Ted-Larry Pebworth. University of Missouri Press, 1997. 76-92. ISBN 978-0826211040.
- Bell, Ilona. “‘What if it be a she?’ The Riddle of Donne's ‘Curse.’” John Donne's “desire of more”: The Subject of Anne More Donne in His Poetry. Ed. Thomas M. Hester. University of Delaware Press, 1996. 106-139. ISBN 978-0874135961.
- Bell, Ilona. “Elizabeth I—'A woman, and (if that be not enough) an unmarried Virgin.’I Political Rhetoric, Power, and Renaissance Women. Ed. Carole Levin and Patricia A. Sullivan. State University of New York Press, 1995. 57-82. ISBN 978-0791425459.
- Bell, Ilona. “Milton's Dialogue with Petrarch.” Milton Studies 28 (1992): 91-120.
- Bell, Ilona. “Herbert's Valdésian Vision.” English Literary Renaissance 17 (1987): 303-28.
- Bell, Ilona. “In the Shadow of The Temple: Herbert and Harvey.” Like Season'd Timber: New Essays on George Herbert. Ed. Edmund Miller and Robert DiYanni. Peter Lang, 1987. 255-79. ISBN 978-0820404660.
- Bell, Ilona. “‘Haunted by Great Ghosts’: Virginia Woolf and To the Lighthouse.” Biography 9 (1986): 150-75.
- Bell, Ilona. “‘Under ye rage of a hott sonn & yr eyes’: John Donne's Love Letters to Anne More.” The Eagle and the Dove: Essays Reassessing John Donne. Ed. Claude J. Summers and Ted-Larry Pebworth. University of Missouri Press, 1986. 25-52. ISBN 978-0826204899.
- Bell, Ilona. “Ben Jonson's ‘On My First Sonne.’” College Language Association Journal 29 (1985): 171-184.
- Bell, Ilona. “Revision and Revelation in Herbert's ‘Affliction I.’” John Donne Journal 3 (1984): 73-96.
- Bell, Ilona. “The Role of the Lady in Donne's Songs and Sonnets.” SEL 23 (1983): 113-29.
- Bell, Ilona. “The Ambiguity of Horatio's 'Story': Hamlet, V.ii.352-59.” Notes & Queries 29 (1982): 118-19.
- Bell, Ilona. “Circular Strategies and Structures in Jonson and Herbert.” Classic and Cavalier: Essays on Jonson and the Sons of Ben. Ed. Claude J. Summers and Ted-Larry Pebworth. University of Pittsburgh Press, 1982. 157-70. ISBN 978-0822934615.
- Bell, Ilona. “The Double Pleasures of Herbert's Collar.” Too Rich to Clothe the Sunne: Essays on George Herbert. Ed. Claude J. Summers and Ted-Larry Pebworth. University of Pittsburgh Press, 1980. 77-88. ISBN 978-0822934097.
- Bell, Ilona. “‘Setting Foot into Divinity’: George Herbert and the English Reformation.” Modern Language Quarterly 38 (1977): 219-41. Rpt. Essential Articles for the Study of George Herbert's Poetry. Ed. John R. Roberts. Archon Books: 1979. 63-83. ISBN 0208017704.
