= Alessandro Striggio the Younger =

Italian opera librettist

Alessandro Striggio II
- Born: ca. 1573
- Origin: Italy
- Died: 1630 (aged 56–57); Venice
- Genres: Opera
- Occupation: Librettist

Alessandro Striggio the Younger (ca. 1573 – 8 June 1630) was an Italian librettist, the son of the composer Alessandro Striggio. The younger Striggio is most famous for his association with the composer Claudio Monteverdi. He wrote the libretto for Monteverdi's first opera Orfeo (1607), a landmark in the history of the genre, as well as the ballo (sung ballet) Tirsi e Clori. Striggio worked at the court of Mantua and died of the plague while on a diplomatic mission to Venice.

== Sources ==
- Timothy Dickey, "Alessandro Striggio (ii)", Allmusic.
