= Scipione Agnelli =

Italian Catholic bishop (1586-1653)

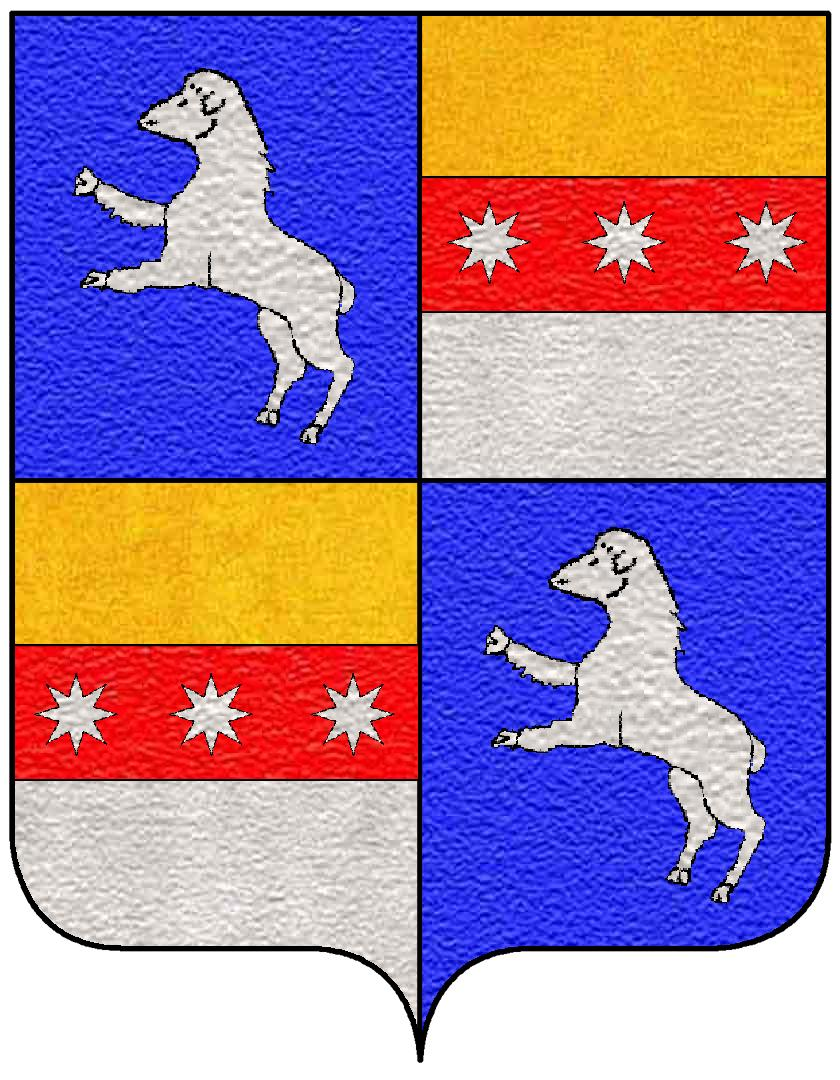
Coat of arms of the Agnelli family of Mantua

Scipione Agnelli (1586 – 1 October 1653) was an Italian Catholic bishop, scholar and jurist.

== Life ==
Born in Mantua, Agnelli was the son of Count Lepido Agnelli, in the service of the House of Gonzaga, and Girolama Pavese.

He was educated at the Gonzaga court of Mantua and Casale and graduated in theology and canon law. In 1611 he pronounced the funeral oration for Eleonora de' Medici, consort of the Duke Vincenzo I Gonzaga.

Ferdinando Gonzaga, the Duke of Mantua and Monferrato, proposed him to hold the position of bishop of Casale Monferrato; he was ordained on 18 February 1624. Because of the War of the Mantuan Succession, for many years he was prevented from carrying out his pastoral activity in Casale.

Agnelli died in Casale Monferrato in 1653.

== Works ==
- Vita della Beata Osanna [Andreasi], 1597 and 1607.
- De ideis libri tres disceptationum, 1611.
- Le nozze di Tetide (lost)
- Il Mariale, 1634.
- Il Bonifacio, tragedia sacra, 1629.
- Annali di Mantova fino al 1637, posthumous opera published circa 1675 completed and cared for by his nephew L. M. Agnelli and dedicated to the Ferdinando Carlo Gonzaga, Duke of Mantua and Montferrat.

== Historical episcopate ==
- Cardinal Giovanni Antonio Serbelloni
- Cardinal Carlo Borromeo
- Cardinal Ottavio Paravicini
- Cardinal Giambattista Leni
- Cardinal Giulio Roma
- Bishop Scipione Agnelli

== Bibliography ==
- David M. Cheney, Scipione Agnelli in Catholic Hierarchy.
