= Giacomo Badoaro =

- Born: 1602 Venice
- Died: 1654 (aged 51–52) Venice
- Genre: poetry libretti
- Literary movement: Baroque
- Notable works: libretto for Il ritorno d'Ulisse in patria

Giacomo Badoaro (Note: His first name may also be spelled Iacopo or Jacopo and his last name Badoer, Badoero or Badovero.) (1602–1654) was a Venetian nobleman and amateur poet. He is most famous for writing the libretto for Claudio Monteverdi's opera Il ritorno d'Ulisse in patria (1640). He also provided librettos for the operas Ulisse errante by Francesco Sacrati (1644) and Elena rapita da Teseo (1653) by Jacopo Melani. He was a member of the Venetian intellectual circle, the Accademia degli Incogniti.
