= Lamentations of Jeremiah the Prophet =

Musical settings of biblical text

The Lamentations of Jeremiah the Prophet have been set by various composers.

== Renaissance ==
=== England ===
Thomas Tallis set the first lesson, and second lesson, of Tenebrae on Maundy Thursday between 1560, and 1569: "when the practice of making musical settings of the Holy Week readings from the Book of Jeremiah enjoyed a brief and distinguished flowering in England (the practice had developed on the continent during the early 15th century)".

The lessons are drawn from Lamentations (Lam. 1, vv.1-2, and Lam. 1, vv.3-5). These famous and notably expressive settings are both a 5 for ATTBB and employ a sophisticatedly imitative texture.

Tallis like many other composers included the following text:

- the announcements Incipit Lamentatio Ieremiae Prophetae ("Here begins the Lamentation of Jeremiah the Prophet"), and De Lamentatione Ieremiae Prophetae ("From the Lamentation of Jeremiah the Prophet");
- the Hebrew letters ALEPH, BETH, GIMEL, DALETH, and HE, that headed each verse in the Vulgate; and,
- the concluding refrain Ierusalem, Ierusalem, convertere ad Dominum Deum tuum ("Jerusalem, Jerusalem, return unto the Lord thy God").

Tallis's inclusion of the refrain emphasises the sombre and melancholy effect of the music.

The Latin Vulgate Bible of Tallis's day considered the Hebrew letters integral to the text, although most English translations of the Bible omit them. The Vulgate indicates 'He' for verse 5 facti sunt hostes, and Heth for verse 8 peccatum peccavit Hierusalem; the Maundy Thursday Tenebrae lessons do not go as far as verse 8; but the use of 'Heth' for verse 5 by Tallis may indicate only its inclusion in contemporary liturgy.

Tallis's settings happen to use successive verses, but the pieces are in fact independent even though performers generally sing both settings together. Composers have been free to use whatever verses they wish, since the liturgical role of the text is somewhat loose; this accounts for the wide variety of texts that appear in these pieces.

William Byrd's early setting of 1563 is rarely performed despite his later popularity and importance. A voice part is missing from the majority of the work as found in the only copy of the lost original manuscript and so performance editions require substantial reconstruction.

Robert White (1538-1574), a Catholic composer from East Anglia, set the Lamentations twice: a 5, and a 6. Another English setting of the Renaissance is that by Osbert Parsley (1511-1585).

=== European Renaissance ===
Most of the continental composers of the Renaissance composed polyphonic settings of the text for use in the liturgy, including Antoine Brumel, Thomas Crecquillon, Costanzo Festa, Marbrianus de Orto, Victoria, Palestrina, Francisco Guerrero, Francisco de Peñalosa, Ferrabosco the Elder, Alonso Lobo, Morales, Pierre de la Rue, Jean Mouton, Bernhard Ycart, Tinctoris, Johannes de Quadris, Bartolomeo Tromboncino, Gaspar, Francesco d’Ana, Erasmus Lapicida, Antoine de Févin, Alexander Agricola, Jacques Arcadelt and Lassus (1584). Of the more obscure composers here, some of these, along with others by even shadowier composers, survive in Petrucci's 1506 two volumes of collected Lamentations and the 1532 anthology edition by Carpentras.

== Baroque ==
Leçons de ténèbres are a French chamber solo style most famously represented by the lessons and responsories of Marc-Antoine Charpentier, and the Leçons de ténèbres of Nicolas Bernier, Jean Gilles, Michel Richard Delalande, Michel Lambert, François Couperin. The high baroque Central European style also includes choral and orchestral settings of lamentations by composers such as Jan Dismas Zelenka.

== Modern ==
Contemporary settings include those by Igor Stravinsky (his Threni), Edward Bairstow, Alberto Ginastera, Ernst Krenek and Leonard Bernstein (his Jeremiah Symphony, which contains Hebrew text in the final movement). Matthew Hunter, a viola soloist at the Berlin Philharmonic, set the Tallis Lamentations to be played by an ensemble of Stradivari violins, violas and violoncellos. The arrangement is for two antiphonally set string quintets. The group plays this piece only a couple of times every two years, when they can get the instruments together.

The Catholic musical family Clamavi de Profundis on YouTube has set Lamentations 1:10-14 and 2:12-15 to music, in Latin.

== Selected recordings ==
- Marc-Antoine Charpentier :
  - Leçons de Ténèbres, Office du Mercredi Saint, H 117, H 120, H 138, H 131, H 126, H141, H 173, Office du Jeudi Saint, H 121, H 139, H 136, H144, H 128, H 528, H 510, H 521, Office du Vendredi Saint, H 95, H 99, H 100, H 140, H 133, H 130. Il Seminario Musicale, Gérard Lesne. Virgin Classics 1995. Diapason d'Or
  - Leçons de Ténèbres, Office du Mercredi Saint, H 96, H 97, H 98, H 111, H 112, H 113, Office du Jeudi Saint, H 102, H 103, H 109; Office du Vendredi Saint, H 105, H 106, H 110 - Judith Nelson, Anne Verkinderen (sopranos), René Jacobs, Concerto Vocale René Jacobs, dir. Harmonia Mundi 1979 Diapason d'or
  - Leçons de Ténèbres, H 96, H 97, H 98/108, H 102, H 103, H 106, H 105, H 109, H 110, H 100 a - Anne Marie Rodde, Sonia Nigoghossian, Helen Watts, Clara Virz, La Grande Écurie et La Chambre du Roy, dir Jean Claude Malgoire. CBS 1978
  - Leçons de Ténèbres, H120, H 121, H 122, H 123, H 124, H 125, H 135, H 136, H 137; Howard Crook, Luc de Meulenaere, haute-contres; Jan Caals, Harry Ruyl, ténors; Michel Verschaeve, basse taille; Kurt Widmer, basse; Musica Polyphonica, dir Louis Devos. Erato 1984.
- François Couperin :
  - Office des Ténèbres de la Semaine Sainte, 3 Leçons de Ténèbres du Mercredy, Il Seminario Musicale, Gérard Lesne. Harmonic records Cantus. 1993 Diapason d’or
  - Hasnaa Bennani, Isabelle Druet, Claire Lefilliâtre (sopranos), Vincent Dumestre, Le Poème Harmonique, Alpha 2014.
- Michel Richard Delalande :
  - Claire Lefilliâtre (soprano), Vincent Dumestre, Le Poème Harmonique, Alpha 2002.
  - Sophie Karthäuser (soprano), Sébastien Daucé, Ensemble Correspondances, Harmonia Mundi 2015.
- Michel Lambert :
  - Neuf Leçons de Ténèbres, Ivete Piveteau, direction, Noemi Rime, soprano, Nathalie Stutzmann, contralto, Charles Brett, haute-contre, Howard Crook, ténor, Virgin classics 1989
  - Neuf leçons de Ténèbres, Marc Mauillon, Myriam Rigol, viole de gamme, Roussel Thibaut, luth, Mankar-Bennis, clavecin. CD Harmonia Mundi 2018

== See also ==
- Tenebrae service
- Responsories for Holy Week
