= List of Orphean operas =

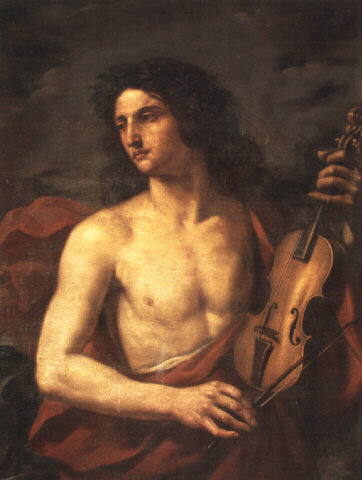
Orpheus Playing the Violin, 17th-century painting by Cesare Gennari

Operas based on the Orphean myths, and especially the story of Orpheus' journey to the underworld to rescue his wife, Eurydice, were amongst the earliest examples of the art form and continue to be written into the 21st century. Orpheus, the Greek hero whose songs could charm both gods and wild beasts and coax the trees and rocks into dance, has achieved an emblematic status as a metaphor for the power of music. The following is an annotated list of operas (and works in related genres) based on his myth. The works are listed with their composers and arranged by date of first performance. In cases where the opera was never performed, the approximate date of composition is given.

== 17th century ==
- 1600 – Jacopo Peri – Euridice, the first genuine opera whose music survives to this day.
- 1602 – Giulio Caccini – Euridice
- 1607 – Claudio Monteverdi – Monteverdi's L'Orfeo, widely regarded as the first operatic masterwork.
- 1616 – Domenico Belli's Orfeo dolente, a set of intermedi presented between the acts of Tasso's Aminta
- 1619 – Stefano Landi – La morte d'Orfeo
- 1638 – Heinrich Schütz – Orpheus und Euridice (music lost)
- 1647 – Luigi Rossi – Orfeo, one of the first operas to be performed in France. Rossi's own wife died while he was composing the score.
- 1654 – Carlo d'Aquino – Orfeo
- 1659 – Johann Jakob Löwe von Eisenach – Orpheus von Thracien
- 1672 – Antonio Sartorio – Orfeo
- 1673 – Matthew Locke – Orpheus and Euridice, a masque presented between the acts of Elkanah Settle's The Empress of Morocco
- 1676 – Giuseppe di Dia – Orfeo
- 1677 – Francesco della Torre – Orfeo
- 1683 – Johann Philipp Krieger – Orpheus und Eurydice
- 1683 – Antonio Draghi – La lira d'Orfeo
- c 1685 – Marc-Antoine Charpentier – La descente d'Orphée aux enfers H 488
- 1689 – Bernardo Sabadini – Orfeo
- 1690 – Louis Lully – Orphée
- 1698 – Reinhard Keiser – Die sterbende Eurydice oder Orpheus
- 1699 – André Campra – Orfeo nell'inferni, Italian-language intermedio of Le carnaval de Venise

== 18th century ==
- 1701 – John Weldon – Orpheus and Euridice
- 1715 – Johann Fux – Orfeo ed Euridice
- 1722 – Georg Caspar Schürmann – Orpheus
- 1726 – Georg Philipp Telemann – Orpheus
- 1740 – John Frederick Lampe – Orpheus and Eurydice
- c. 1740 – Jean-Philippe Rameau – (unfinished project)
- 1749 – Giovanni Alberto Ristori – I lamenti d'Orfeo
- 1750 – Georg Christoph Wagenseil – Euridice
- 1752 – Carl Heinrich Graun – Orfeo
- 1762 – Christoph Willibald Gluck – Orfeo ed Euridice (French version, Orphée et Euridice, 1774)
- 1767 – François-Hippolyte Barthélémon – The Burletta of Orpheus
- 1775 – Antonio Tozzi – Orfeo ed Euridice
- 1776 – Ferdinando Bertoni – Orfeo ed Euridice (to the same libretto as Gluck's more famous work)
- 1781 – Luigi Torelli – Orfeo
- 1785 – Friedrich Benda – Orpheus
- 1786 – Johann Gottlieb Naumann – Orpheus og Eurydice
- 1788 – Carl Ditters von Dittersdorf – Orpheus der Zweyte
- 1788 – Johann Friedrich Reichardt – Orpheus
- 1789 – Vittorio Trento – Orfeo negli Elisi
- 1791 – Joseph Haydn – L'anima del filosofo, ossia Orfeo ed Euridice (originally unperformed, it was premiered in 1951 with Maria Callas as Euridice)
- 1791 – Ferdinando Paer – Orphée et Euridice
- 1792 – Yevstigney Fomin – Орфей и Эвридика
- 1792 – Peter Winter – Orpheus und Euridice
- 1793 – Prosper-Didier Deshayes – Le petit Orphée (parody of Gluck's opera)
- 1796 – Luigi Lamberti – Orfeo
- 1796 – Francesco Morolin – Orfeo ed Euridice
- c.1796, before 1797 – Antoine Dauvergne – Orphée (not performed)
- 1798 – Gottlob Bachmann – Der Tod des Orpheus/Orpheus und Euridice

== 19th century ==
- 1802 – Carl Conrad Cannabich – Orpheus
- 1807 – Friedrich August Kanne – Orpheus
- 1813 – Ferdinand Kauer – Orpheus und Euridice, oder So geht es im Olympus zu
- 1814 – Marchese Francesco Sampieri – Orfeo (cantata?)
- 1858 – Jacques Offenbach – Orphée aux enfers
- 1860 – Gustav Michaelis – Orpheus auf der Oberwelt
- 1867 – Karl Ferdinand Konradin – Orpheus im Dorfe (operetta)

== 20th century ==
- 1907 – Fernando de Azevedo e Silva – A morte de Orfeu
- 1907–16 – Claude Debussy – (unfinished project)
- 1913 – Jean Roger-Ducasse – Orphée, premiered at the Palais Garnier in a production mounted by Ida Rubinstein.
- 1925 – Gian Francesco Malipiero – L'Orfeide, cycle in three parts: I. La morte delle maschere, II. Sette canzoni, III. Orfeo
- 1925 – Darius Milhaud – Les malheurs d'Orphée, chamber opera with a libretto by Armand Lunel
- 1926 – Ernst Krenek – Orpheus und Eurydike
- 1932 – Alfredo Casella – La favola d'Orfeo, chamber opera after Poliziano's L'Orfeo
- 1951 – Pierre Henry, Pierre Schaeffer – Orphée 51 or Toute la lyre
- 1953 – Pierre Henry, Pierre Schaeffer – Orphée 53
- 1978 – Tito Schipa Jr. – Orfeo 9, the first Italian rock opera
- 1978 – Hans Werner Henze – Orpheus (Viennese version 1986)
- 1986 – Harrison Birtwistle – The Mask of Orpheus
- 1993 – Philip Glass – Orphée, chamber opera with a libretto adapted by the composer from Jean Cocteau's film of the same name
- 1996 – Lorenzo Ferrero – La nascita di Orfeo, musical action in one act, libretto by Lorenzo Ferrero and Dario Del Corno, premiered at the Teatro Filarmonico

== 21st century ==
- 2001 – Jonathan Dove – L'altra Euridice, a 30-minute opera in one act for baritone and ensemble, based on a story by Italo Calvino, which retells the Orphean myth from the perspective of Pluto, god of the underworld.
- 2009 – Harrison Birtwistle – The Corridor, a 48-minute chamber opera for two singers and small ensemble.
- 2014 – Christina Pluhar – Orfeo Chamán, a neo-Baroque operatic adaption of the Orpheus myth, featuring styles from Mexico, Venezuela and Bulgaria.
- 2015 – John Robertson – Orpheus, an hour-long masque in six scenes commissioned and performed by Rousse State Opera
- 2020 – Matthew Aucoin – Eurydice, a three-act opera in English with libretto by Sarah Ruhl based on her play of the same name, premiered at the Los Angeles Opera
- 2022 - Jasdeep Singh Degun - Orpheus, Music by Claudio Monteverdi and Jasdeep Singh Degun, composed for 9 western classical voices, 9 Indian classical voices, baroque ensemble and Indian classical ensemble, commissioned by Opera North and SAA-uk.
