= Isabelle Druet =

French mezzo-soprano (born 1979)

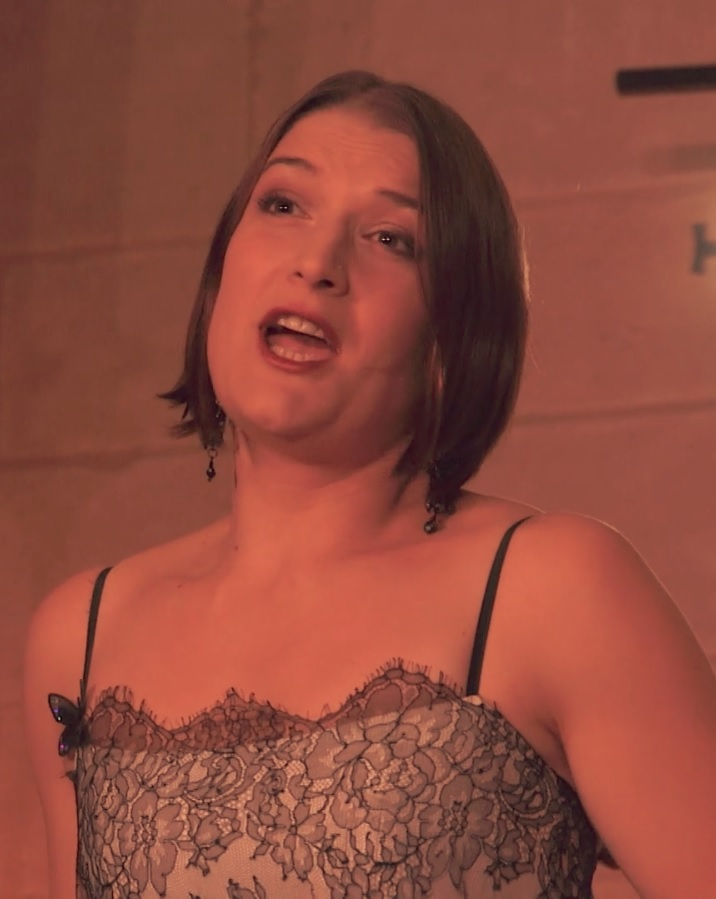
- Druet singing in 2012
- Born: 19 September 1979 (age 47); Niort, France
- Education: Conservatoire de Paris
- Occupation: Operatic mezzo-soprano
- Awards: Victoires de la musique classique; Queen Elisabeth Competition

Isabelle Druet (born 19 September 1979) is a French operatic coloratura mezzo-soprano who has performed internationally. She began her career as an actress and co-founded a theatre company, La Carotte. She has performed in concert and recorded with the ensemble Le Poème Harmonique. On stage, she has performed at opera houses in Paris, Nancy, Lyon and Düsseldorf, among others.

== Career ==
Born in Niort (Deux-Sèvres), Druet started as an actress, taking theatre courses in high school in Salins-les-Baths. She then pursued a Diplôme d'études universitaires scientifiques et techniques (DEUST) (Diploma of scientific and technical university studies) degree in Besançon, studying at the University of Franche-Comté. Though she sang in the university choir, her musical preferences were for reggae and Indian music. In 2000, she co-founded a theatre company based in Besançon, La Carotte, where theatre, mime, music, dance and storytelling performances were mixed. Torn between theatre and music, she finally moved to Paris and studied music for two years in the 7th arrondissement before entering the National Conservatoire.

Studying voice at the Conservatoire de Paris, Druet graduated summa cum laude in 2007. She obtained a master's degree, writing a thesis, La construction du personnage à l'opéra, and attending masterclasses with René Jacobs and Agnès Mellon, among others. In June 2007 she won a first prize in singing with unanimous praise from the jury at the Conservatoire in Isabelle Guillaud's class. That same year, she was elected in the category "Révélation classique lyrique" of the Adami. Simultaneously with her final two years at the Conservatoire, Druet performed in the Opéra-Comique, Théâtre des Champs-Élysées, Théâtre du Châtelet, as well as at regional festivals. Among her roles were Zaïde in Europa Galante by André Campra under the direction of William Christie, which toured in 2005; playing the sorceress in Dido and Aeneas, singing roles in The Clemency of Titus, and playing in the Conservatoire's productions of Eugène Onegin as Mme Larina and in Handel's Alcina as Ruggiero, among many other performances.

In 2008, she was awarded second place in the Queen Elisabeth Competition in Brussels, Belgium and sang at Carnegie Hall in New York City with the baroque ensemble, Les Arts Florissants under the direction of William Christie. The following year, she co-created with Marc Mauillon a presentation for the Emergence Festival. Premiering together, they performed La Valse perdue (The Lost Waltz) by Jacques Offenbach at the Musical Theater of Besançon. The duo continued to perform together, singing at the concert of the Revelations of Victories in 2010, when each of them were awarded the distinction of "laureate" in the Victoires de la musique classique. After touring throughout Europe, performing both operatic roles and singing baroque lyric concert music, Druet made her US orchestral debut performing with the Detroit Symphony Orchestra in 2015. Combining music from two different composers, Argentine Alberto Ginastera and French Maurice Ravel, the concert under the direction of Leonard Slatkin was praised for the thoughtful presentation. Druet was praised for her passionate performance in Ravel's Two Hebraic Melodies, based upon an Aramaic version of the Kaddish. Particularly noted was her performance in Ravel's Sheharazade, for her "intelligent phrasing that was seemingly attuned to every nuance embedded in the text".

=== Opera ===
In 2010, Druet performed the role of Arcabonne in Lully's Amadis. In 2011, she appeared in the title role of Bizet's Carmen at both the opéra national de Lorraine in Nancy and at the Deutsche Oper am Rhein in Düsseldorf. She sang the title role of Rossini's L'italiana in Algeri in Metz. She appeared as Dido in Purcell's Dido and Aeneas. Druet made her debut at the Paris Opera in 2011 as the Page in Salome by Richard Strauss. In 2013, she was Orphée in Gluck's Orphée et Eurydice in the revised version by Hector Berlioz at the Opéra de Limoges, alongside Marion Tassou as Eurydice. She appeared as Concepción in Ravel's L'heure espagnole in Lyon, which was recorded, and as Baba Turk in Britten's The Rake's Progress. She has appeared at the Paris Opera as Tisbe in Rossini's La Cenerentola, as Annina in Verdi's La traviata, and as Ciesca in Puccini's Gianni Schicchi.

=== Concert ===
Druet began performing with the ensemble Le Poème Harmonique, as the group allowed her to explore her interest in a variety of music styles. In 2010, she was featured in a production of Cadmus et Hermione by Lully at the Opéra Comique accompanied by Le Poème Harmonique and Vincent Dumestre. Druet appeared in concert with Le Poème Harmonique, performing and recording rarities such as music by Luis de Briceño and his contemporaries. In Firenze 1616, they focused on Domenico Belli's Orfeo dolente, and music of his time by Claudio Saracini, Giulio Caccini and Cristofano Malvezzi. She recorded Shakespeare Songs with pianist Anne Le Bozec, works inspired by characters from plays such as Juliet and Desdemona, including songs by Schubert, Castelnuovo-Tedesco, Korngold, the ballad "La mort d'Ophélie" by Saint-Saëns and Five Ophelia Songs by Brahms. A review notes her "fine, cultured voice", in four languages.

== Awards ==
- 2007: Révélation Adami (Lyric artist revelation) of the Société civile pour l'administration des droits des artistes et musiciens interprètes, Paris
- 2008: Second prize of the Queen Elisabeth Competition, Brussels
- 2010: Victoires de la musique classique – Laureate in the category "Lyric artist revelation"

== Discography ==
- 2004 Plaisir d'amour with Le Poème Harmonique (CD ALPHA 513)
- 2008 Queen Elisabeth Competition in singing (CD CMIREB)
- 2007 Firenze 1616 with Le Poème Harmonique (CD ALPHA)
- 2008 Lully's Cadmus et Hermione with Le Poème Harmonique (DVD ALPHA701)
- 2010 Monteverdi & Marazzoli: Combattimenti! – Poème Harmonique with Le Poème Harmonique (CD ALPHA172)
- 2010 Mozart: Die Zauberflöte (Third Lady), with René Jacobs (CD Harmonia Mundi HMC 902068.70)
- 2011 Luis de Briceño: El Fenix de Paris with Le Poème Harmonique (CD ALPHA)
- 2011 Jardin Nocturne; Mélodies by Berlioz, Chausson, Fauré, Hahn, Halphen, Massenet and Poulenc with Johanne Ralambondrainy, piano (CD Aparté).
- 2011 Sébastien de Brossard: Oratorios and Léandro with La Rêveuse (CD Mirare MIR125
- 2012 Lully: Phaéton, live at Salle Pleyel
- 2013 Bizet: Le docteur Miracle (DVD)
- 2013 Lully, Campra, Marie Mancini: Presque Reine, Le premier amour de Louis XIV. Éditions Eveil et Découvertes Livre-disque; Musical tale by Damien Pouvreau.
- Révolutions 1830-1848-1870
- Clérambault: Miserere, Couperin: Leçons de ténèbres (Le Poème Harmonique) (CD Alpha)
- 2016 Shakespeare Songs with Anne Le Bozec (CD NoMadMusic)
- 2017 Shéhérazade (Ravel), Orchestre National de Lyon, Leonard Slatkin, Naxos
