= L'Egisto (opera) =

Opera by Francesco Cavalli

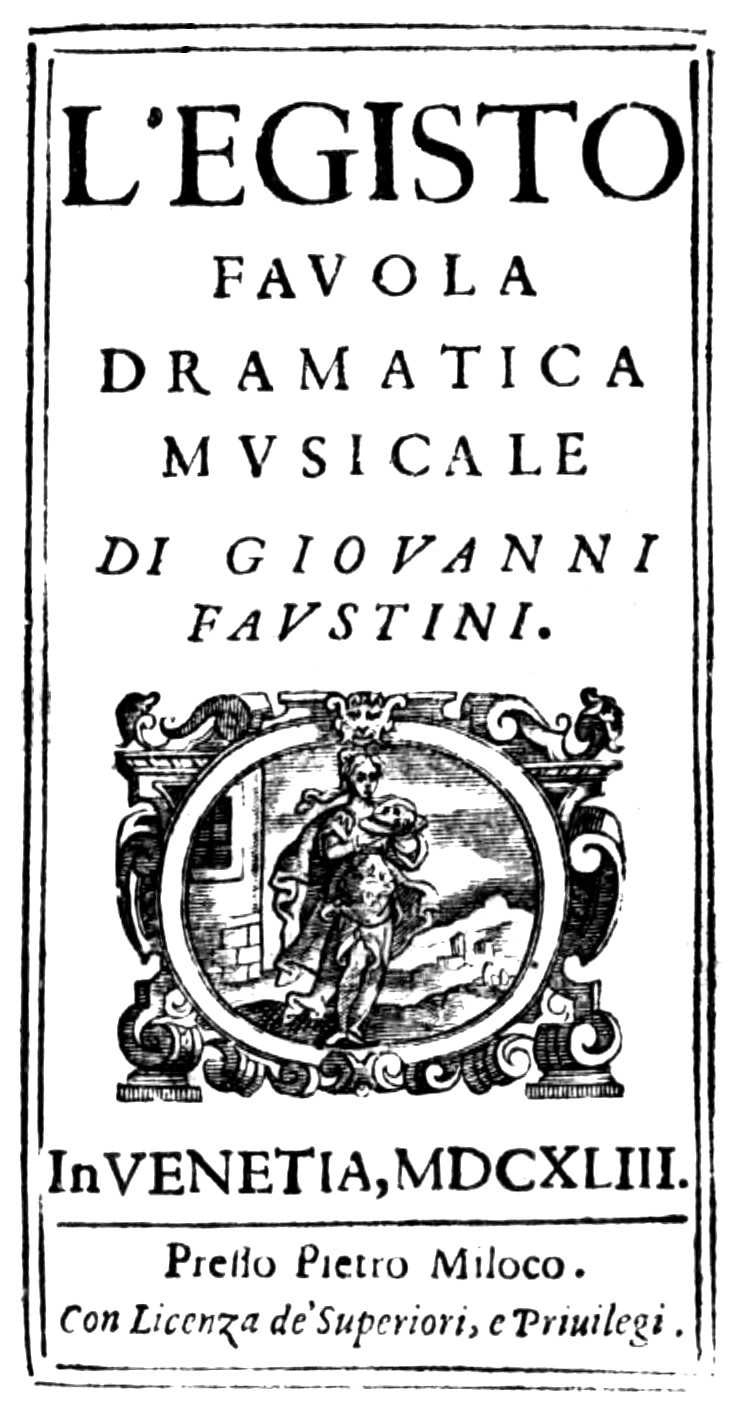
Title page of the original libretto

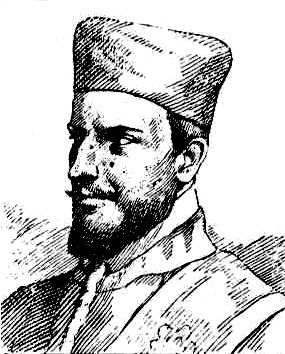
Francesco Cavalli Artistic representation

L'Egisto (Aegisthus) is a 1643 opera in a prologue and three acts by Francesco Cavalli. It was designated as a favola dramatica musicale. The Italian libretto was by Giovanni Faustini, his second text for Cavalli.

== Performance history ==
It was first performed in Venice at the Teatro San Cassiano in 1643. Highly successful in its day, it was subsequently performed throughout Italy.

Based on a suggestion by Henry Prunières in 1913, it was long believed Cavalli's L'Egisto was performed under the auspices of Cardinal Mazarin in Paris in February 1646, but that work is now thought to have been the Roman opera L'Egisto, ovvero Chi soffre, speri by Virgilio Mazzocchi and Marco Marazzoli.

Cavalli's opera is rarely performed in modern times. The US premiere was given by The Santa Fe Opera on 1 August 1974, and it was performed in Stockholm in 1977. Its UK premiere was given by Scottish Opera at the Theatre Royal, Glasgow on 13 January 1982 with Andrew Dalton as Lidio. The production was toured in 1982 and 1984. All of these productions used a modern edition by the conductor Raymond Leppard. Jane Glover, a specialist in 17th-century Venetian opera, gives the following description of Leppard's edition:

Leppard has awarded himself a fairly broad editorial licence: that is, he treats the surviving material rather like a lump of modeller's clay, and moulds it skilfully into alluring shapes to please modern audiencees. In so doing he departs considerably from original practice; but the results, in terms of music-theatre, are spectacularly successful.

The changes that Leppard makes fall into four main categories: restructuring, transposition, rescoring and (frankly) recomposition.

The opera was performed by the early music group Le Poème Harmonique, conducted by Vincent Dumestre, at the Opéra-Comique in Paris beginning on 1 February 2012. The orchestra included a continuo group of two harpsichords, three theorbos and a lirone, and a small orchestra of strings plus two flutes.

A new edition prepared and directed by Marcio da Silva was performed by HGO at The Cockpit Theatre, London in June 2021.

== Roles ==
Role	Voice type
Lidio	alto
Egisto	tenor
Ipparco	baritone
Apollo	alto
Clori	soprano
Climene	soprano
Dema	alto
Voluptia	soprano
Belezza	soprano
Amore	soprano
Semele	soprano
Didone	contralto
Fedra	soprano
Hero	soprano
Cinea	tenor
L'Aurora	soprano
La Notte	contralto
Venere	soprano

== Synopsis ==
The Egisto of this opera is not the Aegisthus of the Odyssey. This Egisto is a descendant of the sun-god Apollo, and for that reason is treated as an enemy by the goddess Venus. Over a year before the action begins he loved Clori and she returned his love. While spending time together on the seashore on the island of Delos, they were captured by pirates and sold separately into captivity. Climene, a young woman on the island of Zakynthos, was captured roughly at the same time by the same pirates on the very day of her marriage to Lidio. She was sold to the same cruel master as Egisto. A year later, they have managed to escape and Egisto has escorted Climene back to Zakynthos, where the main action takes place. They both set out to find their original lovers. What they do not know is that the pirates brought Clori to Zakynthos, where she fell in love with Lidio. Climene's brother, Ipparco, also fell in love with her.

The division into acts reflects the passage of the day from dawn through night to dawn again, to parallel Egisto's heritage as a descendant of the Sun.

Time: Legendary
Place: The island of Zakynthos

=== Act 1 ===
Set during the morning of the day after Egisto and Climene have landed on the island, the situation of the two mis-matched couples is established. Lidio and Clori are lovers while Egisto and Climene are friends.

=== Act 2 ===
In the afternoon, Egisto and Climene are trying to get back to their former lovers, only to be rejected by them.

=== Act 3 ===
When the night falls, we see the machinations of the gods behind the sufferings of the characters on earth. Lidio is captured by Ipparco, and Egisto goes mad. The story is however brought to a happy conclusion.

== Recording ==
- 2021: Marc Mauillon as Egisto, Sophie Junker as Clori, Zachary Wilder as Lidio, Ambroisine Bré as Climene, David Tricou as La Notte/Apollo, Romain Bockler as Hipparco. Le Poème Harmonique, conducted by Vincent Dumestre. Sound recording made on 17 and 22 March 2021 at the Royal Opera of Versailles. Label: Château de Versailles Spectacles.
