= Martine de Clermont-Tonnerre =

French film producer

Martine de Clermont-Tonnerre is a French film producer.

== Filmography ==
- Chacun pour toi, (1993)
- Ma sœur chinoise, (1994)
- Metroland, (executive, 1997)
- Central Station, (1998)
- Cabaret Balkan, (1998)
- Der Vulkan, (1999)
- Blue Away to America, (1999)
- Unleaded, (2000)
- Comedy of Innocence, (2000)
- Philanthropy, (2002)
- Remake, (2003)
- The Living World, (2003)
- Le soleil assassiné, (2003)
- Le Pont des Arts, (2004)
- Quartier V.I.P., (2005)
- Private Property, (2006)
- Memories, (2007)
- Private Lessons, (2008)
- Nucingen House, (2008)
- Correspondences, (short, 2009)
- Sans rancune!, (2009)
- The Portuguese Nun, (2009)
- Demain?, (2011)
- Sous le figuier, (2012)
- Gebo and the Shadow, (2012)
- Le tourbillon de Jeanne, (TV, 2013)
- La Sapienza, (2014)
- Barrage, (2017)
- The Mustang, (2019)
