= Claire Lefilliâtre =

French soprano singer

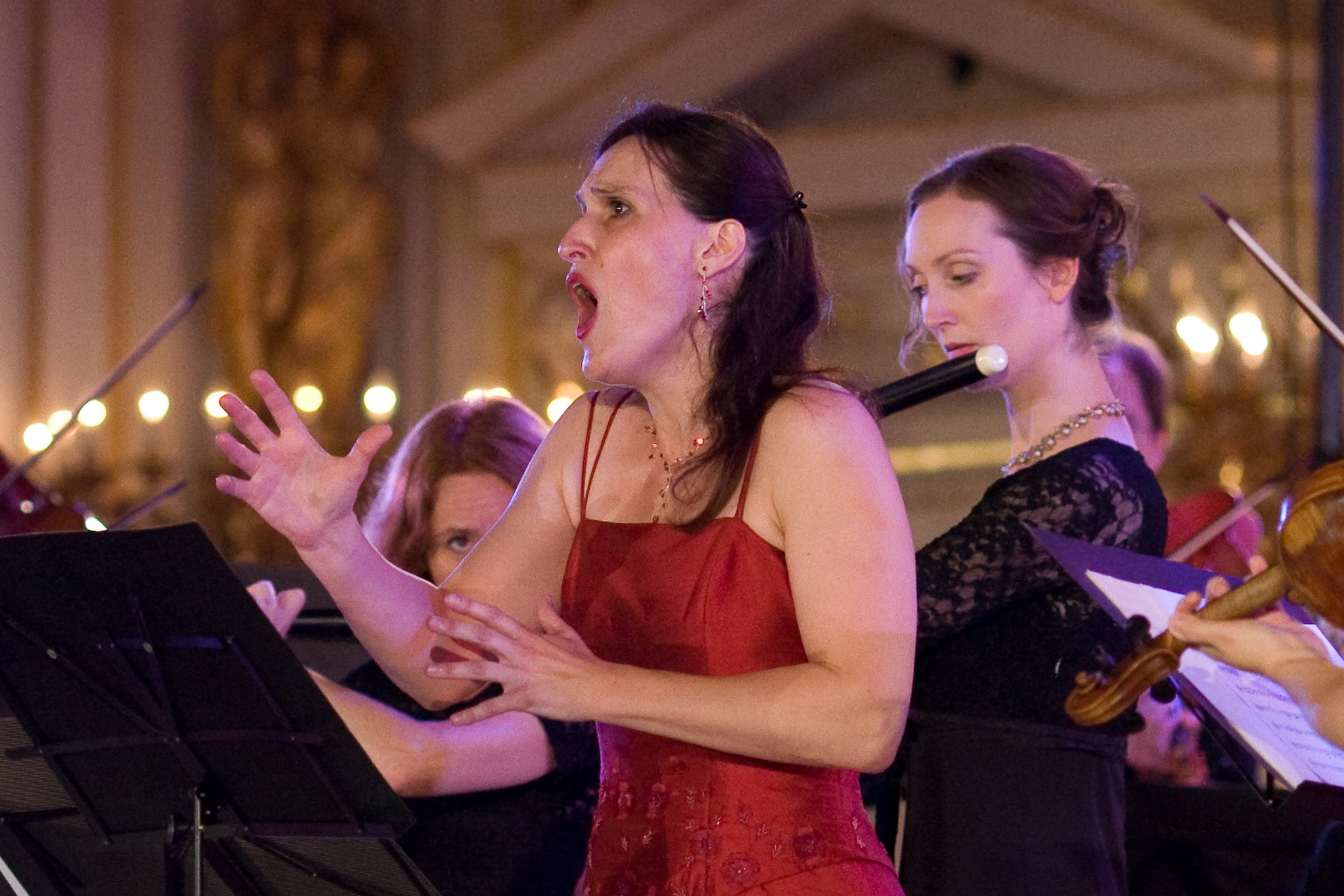
- Lefilliâtre in le Festin romain, Spanish Hall, Prague Castle, 2013
- Born: France
- Occupation: Soprano
- Years active: 1990s–present
- Style: Baroque music

Claire Lefilliâtre is a French soprano specialising in Baroque music repertoire.

She collaborates mainly with the ensemble Le Poème Harmonique led by Vincent Dumestre.

== Selected discography ==
With Le Poème Harmonique

- 1999: L'Humaine Comédie by Étienne Moulinié, with Sophie Watillon and Friederike Heumann (Alpha)
- 2001: Aux Marches du Palais (Alpha)
- 2001: Lamentations by Emilio de' Cavalieri (Alpha)
- 2002: Le Consert des Consorts by Pierre Guédron, with Sophie Watillon and Friederike Heumann (Alpha)
- 2002: Il Fasolo? (Alpha)
- 2002: Tenebrae by Michel Richard Delalande (Alpha)
- 2003: Nova Metamorfosi (Alpha)
- 2003: Je meurs sans mourir by Antoine Boësset (Alpha)
- 2004: Plaisir d'amour with Bruce Duisit and Isabelle Druet
- 2005: Le Bourgeois gentilhomme at the Royal Opera of Versailles with Benjamin Lazar (Alpha)[DVD], le grand prix du disque and DVD of the Académie Charles Cros, baroque music category
- 2007: Carnets de voyages by Charles Tessier (Alpha)
- 2008: Cadmus & Hermione by Jean-Baptiste Lully and Philippe Quinault (Alpha)[DVD]
- 2010: Combattimenti by Monteverdi–Marazzoli (Alpha) – including the Lamento della Ninfa

=== Other recordings ===
- Motets à une et deux voix by André Campra with Raphaële Kennedy and the ensemble Da Pacem (Arion)
- Madrigali e Altre Musiche Concertate by Tarquinio Merula with the ensemble Suonare e Cantare (Pierre Verany)
- Muse honorons l'illustre & grand Henry by Claude Lejeune with Les Pages & les Chantres of the Centre de Musique Baroque de Versailles, dir. Olivier Schneebeli (Alpha)
- Histoire de la nativité by Heinrich Schütz with Hans-Jörg Mammel and the Chœur de chambre de Namur and the ensemble La Fenice, dir. Jean Tubéry (K617)
- Te Deum H.146 by Marc-Antoine Charpentier with the Chœur de chambre de Namur and the ensemble La Fenice, conducted by. Jean Tubéry (Ricercar) 2004.
- Italian Music in the Low Countries with the ensemble Currende, conducted by Erik Van Nevel. Klara, 2010.
- Christ lag in Todesbanden by Johann Pachelbel with the Chœur de chambre de Namur and the ensemble Les Agrémens, dir. Jean Tubéry (Ricercar)

== Filmography ==
- Lefilliâtre lent her voice to Natacha Régnier for the interpretation of Monteverdi's Lamento della ninfa in the 2004 film Le Pont des Arts, directed by Eugène Green. All the music in this film is interpreted by Le Poème Harmonique conducted by Vincent Dumestre.
- 2016: The Son of Joseph, by Eugène Green
