= Luca Bati =

Italian Baroque composer

Luca Bati (c. 1546 – 17 October 1608) was an Italian Baroque composer and music teacher. One of his pupils was Marco da Gagliano.

Bati was born and died in Florence. He was maestro di cappella of Pisa Cathedral (1596) and then of the Medici Court and Florence Cathedral (from 1598 to 1599). His dramatic music for Medici weddings and Florentine carnivals is lost but his surviving madrigals (1594, 1598) and sacred works are of high quality though not notably progressive.

== Works ==
- II primo libro de Madrigali 5 voci (contains 23 madrigals by Bati and one each by Neri Alberti and Antonio Bicci), Venice, 1594
- II secondo libro de Madrigali 5 voci (contains 21 madrigals by Bati and one by Piero Strozzi), Venice, 1598
- Music for the intermedio to Giovan Maria Cecchi's Rappresentazione sacra Esaltazione della Croce, Florence, 1589
- Music for Gino Ginori's Mascherata Le fiamme d'amore, Florence, 1595
- Third and fourth chorus to Il Rapimento di Cefalo (text by Gabriello Chiabrera, music mostly by Giulio Caccini with contributions by Stefano Venturi del Nibbio and Piero Strozzi), Florence, 1600
