= Johannes de Quadris =

Italian composer

Johannes de Quadris (Quatris) (before 1410 – 1457?) was an Italian composer of the early Renaissance. He was one of the first composers of polyphony associated with the basilica of St. Mark's in Venice, and the earliest known composer to write a polyphonic setting of the Magnificat for four voices.

== Life ==
He was a priest, and originally from the diocese of Valva-Sulmona, in the vicinity of L'Aquila, in the Abruzzo region of central Italy. Sometime before 1436 he began to work as a singer at San Marco in Venice, which was then at the very beginning of its rise to fame; the first mention of a choir there is found in a document of 1403 (by the end of the 16th century, it was one of the most renowned musical institutions in Europe). Quadris worked at San Marco from at least 1436, the date given on his Magnificat, to the time that a Vatican document listed him as "deceased", in 1457. He made repeated requests (1450, 1452, 1454) to Pope Nicholas V to obtain a prebend in Aquileia.

== Music ==
His musical style is highly varied, and possibly he wrote his surviving pieces over a career of more than the twenty documented years. The motet Gaudeat ecclesia and the Magnificat are stylistically related to the music of the late Middle Ages, with a cantus firmus surrounded by texturally distinct vocal lines; the other works, with their lighter texture, are more characteristic of Italian composers writing later in the century. Clarity of the text is foremost in these works, as is liturgical utility. According to Giulio Cattin, writing in the New Grove: "Taken as a whole, his output developed in a way typical of the 15th century, from a northern late Gothic idiom to the expressive, tuneful simplicity of Italian music."

The Magnificat is the earliest polyphonic setting of the Canticle for four voices; the few surviving earlier settings are all for two or three only. It is marked "pbr. Johannes de Quatris: 1436 mensis maij Venet[iis]" – a much-debated notation which may refer to the time and place of composition (May 1436, Venice) or perhaps an occasion for performance, or even the date the manuscript was copied.

Quadris's music remained popular for more than half a century, as shown by the many copies made of his hymn Iste confessor, as well as the printing of his music for the Passion by Ottaviano Petrucci in 1506 (the only source that gives Quadris as the composer). The music for the Passion, which includes Lessons for Matins as well as a set of Lamentations, also has been found in a manuscript, now in Vicenza, which was copied around 1440. His settings of the Lamentations were in use at San Marco until they were replaced by those by Giovanni Croce in 1603, another indication of the esteem in which they were held.

== Works ==
=== Attributed to Johannes de Quadris in contemporary sources ===
- Chants for a Good Friday procession (two voices)
- Gaudeat ecclesia (motet, for four voices)
- Iste confessor (hymn, for three voices; attributed to him in the manuscript I-Fn 112bis by Antonius Janue, around 1456)
- Lamentations (two voices)
- Magnificat (four voices; signed and dated 1436)
- Planctus Mariae: Cum autem venissem

=== Anonymous, attributed to de Quadris by contemporary musicologists ===
- Douce speranche (virelai)
- Se je n'é mal (virelai)
