= The Son of Joseph =

- Theatrical release poster
- Directed by: Eugène Green
- Written by: Eugène Green
- Produced by: Didier Jacob; Francine Jacob
- Starring: Victor Ezenfis; Natacha Régnier; Fabrizio Rongione; Mathieu Amalric; Maria de Medeiros
- Cinematography: Raphaël O'Byrne
- Edited by: Valérie Loiseleux
- Production companies: Coffee and Films; Les Films du Fleuve; Film Factory; TSF; En Haut des Marches
- Distributed by: Les Films du Losange (France); Lumière (Belgium)
- Release dates: 12 February 2016 (Berlinale); 20 April 2016 (France)
- Running time: 113 minutes
- Countries: France; Belgium
- Language: French
- Budget: €1.8 million

The Son of Joseph (French: Le Fils de Joseph) is a 2016 Franco-Belgian drama film written and directed by Eugène Green. It was screened in the Forum section of the 66th Berlin International Film Festival.

== Cast ==
- Victor Ezenfis as Vincent
- Natacha Régnier as Marie
- Fabrizio Rongione as Joseph
- Mathieu Amalric as Oscar Pormenor
- Maria de Medeiros as Violette Tréfouille
- Julia de Gasquet as Bernadette
- Jacques Bonnaffé as Peasant
- Christelle Prot as Philomène
- Adrien Michaux as Philibert
- Louise Moaty as an actress
- Claire Lefilliâtre as a singer
- Vincent Dumestre as a theorbist
