= Giovanni Battista Fasolo =

Italian composer

Giovanni Battista Fasolo, O.F.M.Conv (Asti, ca. 1598 – Palermo after 1664), was a Franciscan friar, organist and composer.

In his middle years, Fasolo was primarily known for his 1645 organ annual, which, like L'organo suonarino of Adriano Banchieri, from the generation before him, was intended for use in small parish churches, and are much simpler than those used in Venice. In 1659, Fasolo became maestro di cappella to the Archbishop of Monreale.

Until recently, many of G.B. Fasolo's secular works were attributed to other composers, particularly the Venetian Francesco Manelli, the composer of the first commercial operas in music history, or to a third unknown composer known as "Il Fasolo?".

However, following the work of Francesco Luisi, Mariangela Donà, and Claudio Bacciagaluppi the attribution of the major works under the heading "Il Fasolo?" to G.B. Fasolo is now reasonably secure, and listed under his own entry, by Eleanor Selfridge-Field, in the current New Grove.

== Extant works ==
- Op. 3 "Misticanza di Vigna alla Bergamasca; il Canto della Barchetta et altre cantate et ariette per Voce et Chitarra." Robletti Rome, 1627. Sole surviving copy was in the possession of Dr. Oscar Chilesotti in 1886. A facsimile of a single song "I bei guardi" from this collection is included in an article by Chilesotti- "Notes sur les tablatures de luth et de guitare" originally published in "Encyclopedie de la musique"; edited by Albert Lavignac (1925). Part 1, vol. 2 : Italie - Allemagne, p. 636-684. This is particularly interesting because figures have been added to the guitar alfabeto symbols to indicate how the accompaniment should be strummed.
- Il carro di Madama Lucia. Rome, 1628 (*attributed).
- Aria - Se desiate, o bella, 1629 (*attributed).
- Op. 6 Second Book of Motets for 2-3 voices, with a mass for 3 voices, Naples, 1635.
- Op. 8 Annuale che contiene tutto quello, che deve far un Organista per risponder al Choro tutto l'Anno; for organ, Venice, 1645. (263 pages of organ music!)
- Magnificat, Beatus vir, a 5. ca. 1645.(*attributed)
- Op. 9 Arie spirituali morali, e indifferenti, 2-3 vv, with dialogues 3vv and two arias for solo voice. Palermo, 1659.

== Recordings ==
- Aria Cangia, cangia tue voglie. Aria from Op. 3 La barchetta passaggiera. Rome, 1627. Recorded by Beniamino Gigli London, 1947.
- Il Fásolo? Le Poème Harmonique, dir. Vincent Dumestre Alpha-23 (CD) 2004

== Scores ==
- Giovanni Battista Fasolo. Annuale. Op. 8. Venedig 1645. Versetten. Ricercaten. Canzonen und Fugen durch das ganze Kirchenjahr für Orgel. Edited by Rudolf Walter. Heidelberg : Willy Müller-Süddeutscher Musikverlag, [1965, 77].

=== External links ===
- Free scores by Giovanni Battista Fasolo at the International Music Score Library Project (IMSLP)
