= Barbara Russano Hanning =

American musicologist (born 1940)

Barbara Russano Hanning (born 1940) is an American musicologist who specializes in 16th- and 17th-century Italian music. She has also written works on the music of 18th-century France and on musical iconography.

== Education and career ==
Barbara Russano Hanning earned her B.A. from Barnard College and her Ph.D. in Musicology from Yale University.

She is a Professor Emeritus on the music faculty at The City College of New York (CCNY) and the City University of New York (CUNY) Graduate Center. During her tenure at CCNY, she chaired the Music Department intermittently for 15 years. From 1993 to 1997, Hanning served as president of the Society for Seventeenth-Century Music.

Hanning is on the music faculty of The City College [CCNY] and the City University of New York [CUNY] Graduate Center as Professor Emeritus. She chaired the Music Department of The City College intermittently for fifteen years. From 1993–1997 she served as president of the Society for Seventeenth-Century Music.

== Writings ==
Many of Hanning's writings have focused on early operas. She is the author of three books and several journal articles. She has also contributed numerous entries to The New Grove Dictionary of Music and Musicians (1980) and its second edition of 2000; including biographical articles on Giulio Belli, Giulio Caccini, Gabriello Chiabrera, Marco da Gagliano, Giovanni Battista Guarini, Ottavio Rinuccini, Alessandro Striggio, and Torquato Tasso; and entries on the operas Dafne by Rinuccini, Dafne by Gagliano, Euridice by Peri, and Il rapimento di Cefalo by Caccini.

== Works ==
=== Books ===
- Of Poetry and Music's Power: Humanism and the Creation of Opera. Ann Arbor, MI: UMI Research Press, 1980. 371 pp.
- Musical Humanism and Its Legacy: Essays in Honor of Claude V. Palisca. Stuyvesant, NY: Pendragon, 1992. 543 pp.
- Concise History of Western Music. Based on Grout/Palisca, A History of Western Music. Norton, 1998. 585 pp. Second edition, 2002.

=== Articles ===
- "Apologia pro Ottavio Rinuccini," Journal of the American Musicological Society 26/2 (Summer 1973), 240–262.
- "Glorious Apollo: Poetic and Political Themes in the First Opera," Renaissance Quarterly 32/4 (Winter 1979), 485–513.
- "Music in Italy on the Brink of the Baroque," Renaissance Quarterly 37/1 (Spring 1984), 1–20.
- "The Iconography of a Salon Concert: A Reappraisal," in French Musical Thought, 1600-1800, ed. Georgia Cowart. Ann Arbor and London: UMI Research Press, 1989, pp. 129–48.
- "Reinventing Orpheus: New Music for a New Age," in The Waverly Concert Program Guide, Vol. 5, No. 3, pp. 7–17 (an essay commissioned by the Waverly Consort for their concerts in Alice Tully Hall on March 2 and 4, 1989).
- "Conversation and Musical Style in the Late Eighteenth-Century Parisian Salon," Eighteenth-Century Studies 22/4 (Summer, 1989), 512–28.
- "Monteverdi's Three Genera: A Study in Terminology," in Musical Humanism and Its Legacy: Essays in Honor of Claude Palisca, eds. Nancy K. Baker and Barbara R. Hanning. Stuyvesant, NY: Pendragon, 1992, pp. 145–70.
- "Images of Monody in the Age of Marino," in The Sense of Marino: Literature, Fine Arts and Music of the Italian Baroque, ed.Francesco Guardiani. New York, Ottawa, Toronto: Legas, 1994. pp. 465–86.
- "Some Images of Monody in the Early Baroque," in Con Che Soavità: Studies in Italian Opera, Song, and Dance 1580–1740, eds. Iain Fenlon and Tim Carter. Oxford: Clarendon Press, 1995, pp. 1–12.
- "The End of L'Orfeo: Padre, figlio, e Rinuccini," Journal of Seventeenth-Century Music 7/2, (cited) Vol. 9/1 (2003). <https://web.archive.org/web/20190405171207/http://sscm-jscm.press.uiuc.edu/>.
- "From Saint to Muse: Representations of Saint Cecilia in Florence." Music in Art 29/1-2 (2004): 91-103.
