= Le Pont des Arts =

2004 film

- Directed by: Eugène Green
- Starring: Natacha Régnier; Adrien Michaux
- Music by: Vincent Dumestre
- Release date: August 2004 (LIFF)
- Running time: 126 minutes
- Country: France
- Language: French

Le Pont des Arts is a 2004 French drama film directed by Eugène Green, starring Natacha Régnier.

== Plot ==
The story is of a young man who falls in love with and finds the whole meaning of his life contained in a young woman who sings a baroque lament on record. He discovers she committed suicide from the Pont des Arts, so that is the only way he can be with her too. The action unrolls in Paris between 1979 and 1980,

== Cast ==
- Natacha Régnier - Sarah Dacruon
- Adrien Michaux - Pascal
- Alexis Loret - Manuel
- Jérémie Renier - Cédric
- Denis Podalydès - Guigui, l'Innomable
- Olivier Gourmet - Jean-Astolphe Méréville
- Joséphine Bouvet Sandrine
- Robert Capovilla- Tenore
- Pierre Samuel secondo Tenore
- Xavier Clion Baritono Basso
