= Cadmus et Hermione =

Opera by Jean-Baptiste Lully

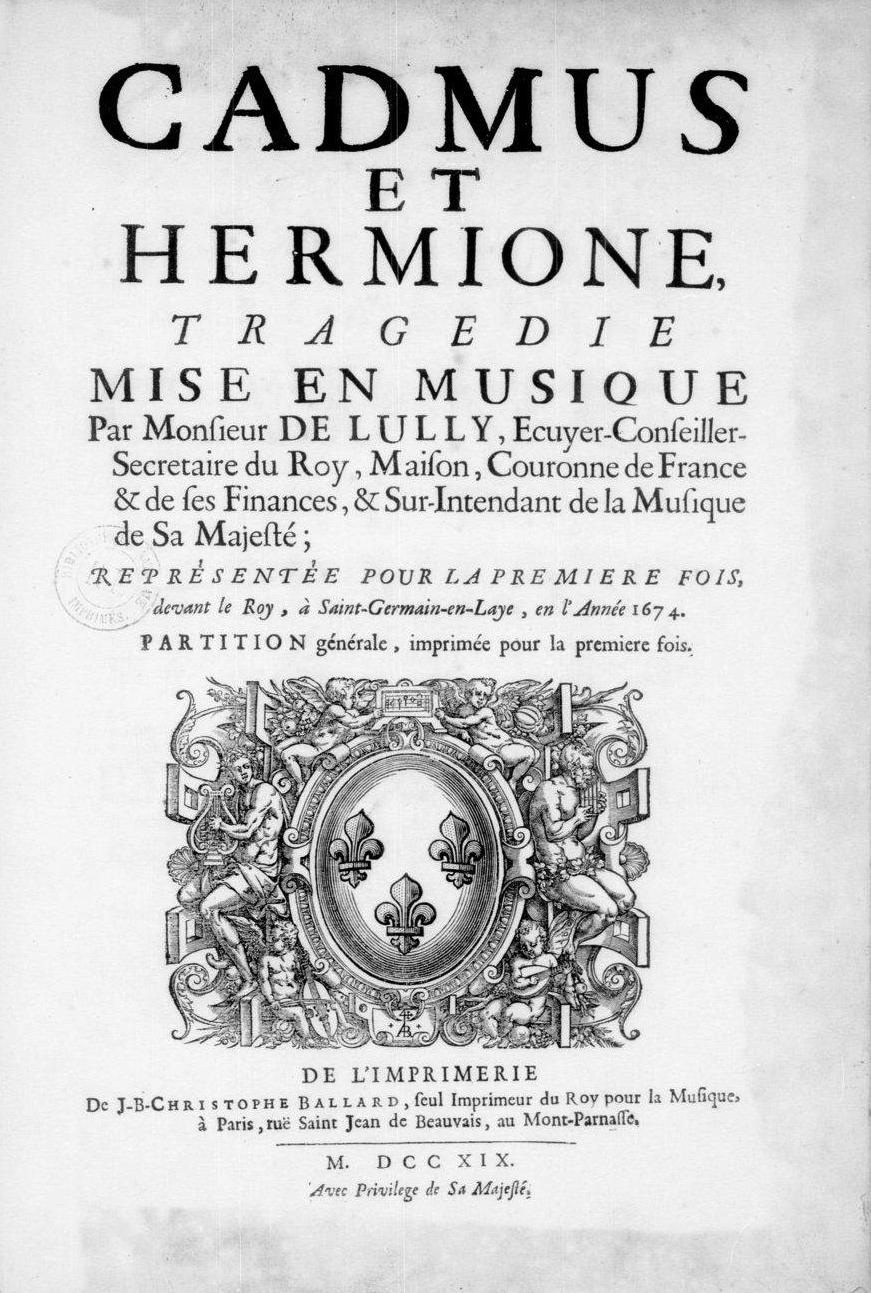
Cadmus et Hermione

Cadmus et Hermione is a tragédie en musique in a prologue and five acts by Jean-Baptiste Lully. The French-language libretto is by Philippe Quinault, after Ovid's Metamorphoses. It was first performed on 27 April 1673 by the Paris Opera at the Jeu de paume de Béquet.

The prologue, in praise of King Louis XIV, represents him as Apollo slaying the Python of Delphi. The opera itself concerns the love story of Cadmus, legendary founder and king of Thebes, Greece, and Hermione (Harmonia), daughter of Venus and Mars. Other characters include Pallas Athene, Cupid, Juno, and Jupiter.

With Cadmus et Hermione, Lully invented the form of the tragédie en musique (also known as tragédie lyrique). From contemporary Venetian opera, Lully incorporated elements of comedy among the servants, elements which he would later avoid, as would subsequent reformers in Italian opera.

A contemporary transcription of the overture by Jean-Henri d'Anglebert remains a possible part of the harpsichord repertoire.

In early 2008, the French ensemble Le Poème Harmonique staged a performance of the opera in Paris and Rouen, among other places.

== Recordings ==
- 2019: Le Poème Harmonique (orchestra), Ensemble Aedes (chorus), Vincent Dumestre (conductor). Soloists: Thomas Dolié (Cadmus, baritone), Adèle Charvet (Hermione, mezzo-soprano), Eva Zaïcik (Charite, mezzo-soprano), Lisandro Abadie (Arbas/Pan, baritone), Nicholas Scott (La Nourrice/Dieu Champêtre, tenor), Virgile Ancely (Draco/Mars, bass), Guilhem Worms (Le Grand Sacrificateur/Jupiter, bass-baritone), Marine Lafdal-Franc (Pallas/Aglante/L'Hymen/Palès, soprano), Enguerrand De Hys (Le Soleil/Premier Prince Tirien, tenor). Recorded 25 to 28 November 2019 at the Château de Versailles. Label: Château de Versailles Spectacles, 2 CDs.
