= Luis de Briceño =

Spanish guitarist, music theorist and composer

Luis de Briceño (also Briçeño, Brizeño; fl. 1610s–1630s) was a Spanish guitarist and music theorist who introduced the Spanish guitar style in France, where previously only the lute was considered a serious plucked instrument. Nothing is known about his youth or his activities in Spain. He married Anne Gaultier. In February 1627, two sons, Charles and Claude, were baptized in the church of Saint-Sulpice. Their godparents were Claude Lesclop, an instrument maker; Bertrand de Vignolles, a field marshal to Louis XIII; and Jeanne de Montluc, wife of the Marquis de Sourdis. He travelled in high courtly circles in both countries, and is first cited as an authority on the Spanish guitar in 1614. His Metodo mui facilissimo para aprender a tañer la guitarra a lo español (1626, Very Easy Method to Learn to Play the Guitar in the Spanish Style) is the main source of knowledge of the Spanish style, since few books appeared during this period in Spain itself.

His own transcriptions include villanos, villancicos, pasacalles, tonos frances, españoletas, romances, folías, seguidillas and a "Danza de la Hacha". A selection was recorded by Le Poème Harmonique, directed by Vincent Dumestre, for Alpha/Outhere in 2011, and the group La Sonorosa, directed by Edwin García, released the album "Vida Bona" Luis de Briceño, sus sones y sus canciones (Luis de Briceño, His Songs and Music) in 2019 for the record label La Mà de Guido.

== Links ==
Digital copy of "Metodo mui facilissimo..." at National Library in France https://gallica.bnf.fr/ark:/12148/bpt6k1168966d.image
