= Adelaide (Sartorio) =

Opera by Antonio Sartorio (first performance, 1672)

Adelaide or l'Adelaide is an opera by Antonio Sartorio to an Italian libretto by Pietro Dolfin. It was premiered in Venice at the Teatro San Salvatore in 1672. An exact date is not known, although the libretto is dedicated February 19, 1672.

The genre of the opera is dramma per musica. The libretto follows the same historical events as Handel's later Lotario.

== Roles ==
- Adelaide, soprano
- Adalberto, soprano
- Ottone, soprano
- Gissilla, soprano
- Annone, contralto
- Delma, tenor
- Amedeo, tenor
- Lindo, tenor
- Berengario, bass
- Armondo, bass

== Synopsis ==
The story takes place in 951 AD, when, after the death of her husband Lothair II of Italy, Adelaide of Italy is forced to marry Adalbert of Italy by his father, Berengar II of Italy.
