= John Dancer (dramatist) =

Irish translator and playwright

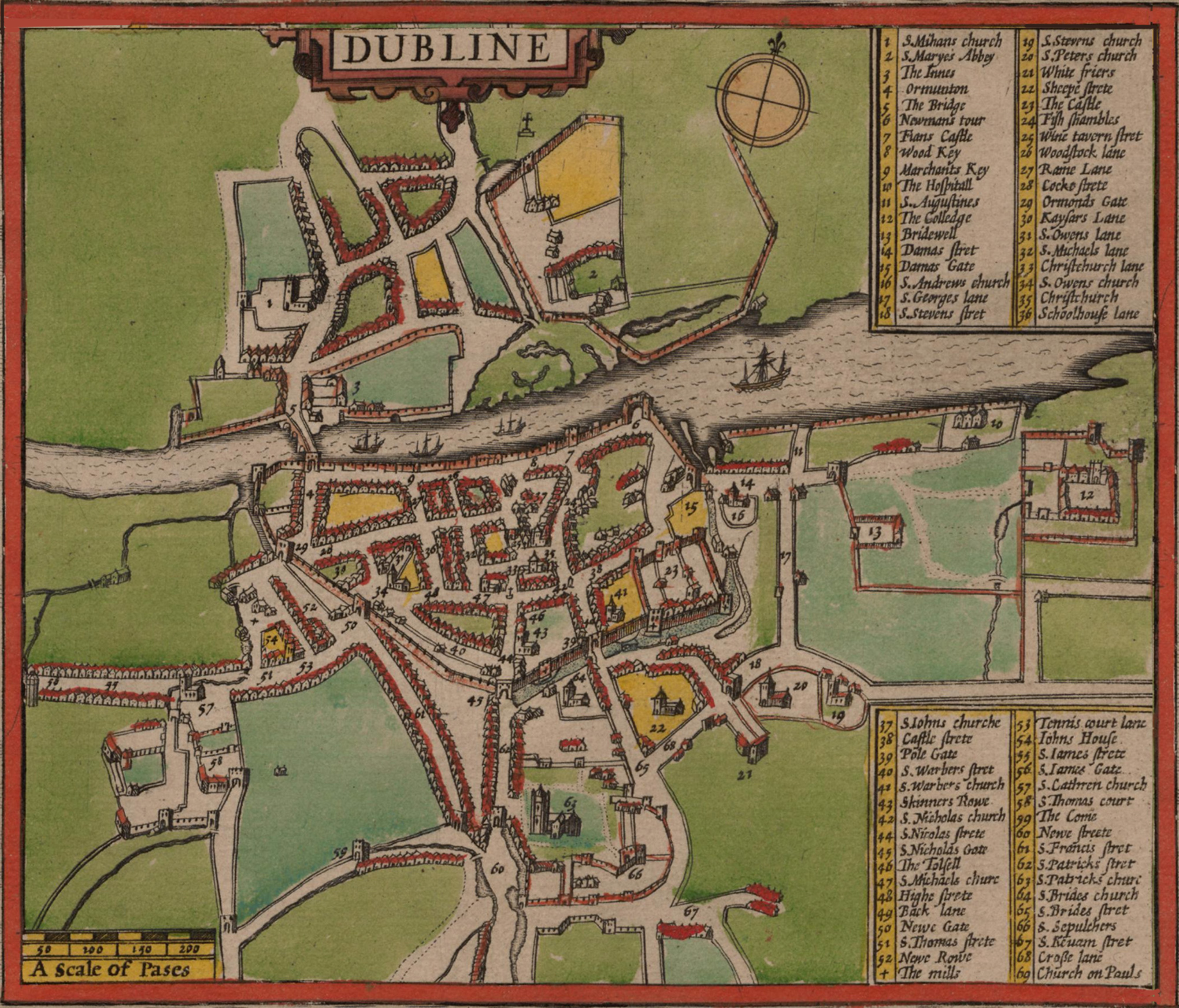
Map of Dublin by John Speed, 1610

John Dancer (fl. 1660–1675) was an Irish dramatist, connected with the Theatre Royal, Dublin. His works consist of several translations from Italian and French, original plays, and some miscellaneous stories and poems.

== Life ==
John Dancer lived for some time in Dublin, where two of his dramatic translations were performed with some success at the Theatre Royal. To the Duke of Ormonde and to the Duke's children, Thomas, Earl of Ossory, and Lady Mary Cavendish, he dedicated his books, and in 1673 he wrote that he owed to the Duke "all I have and all I am". It is probable that he was in Ormonde's service while he was Lord-Lieutenant of Ireland.

== Identity ==
Langbaine groundlessly credits him with the alternative name of Dauncy, and identifies him with one John Dauncy, who was a voluminous translator living at the same time. But John Dancer and John Dauncy were clearly two persons.

== Works ==
"The Variety" (1660)

Thou saist I swore I lov'd thee best,
And that my heart liv'd in thy breast,
And now thou wondrest much that I
Should what I swore then, now deny,
And upon this thou taxest me
With faithlessenesse, inconstancy:
Thou hast no reason so to do,
Who can't dissemble ne'r must wooe.

That so I lov'd thee 'tis confest,
But 'twas because I judg'd thee best,
For then I thought that thou alone
Wast vertues, beauties paragon:
But now that the deceit I find,
To love thee still were to be blind,
And I must needs confesse to thee
I love in love variety.

Alas! should I love thee alone,
In a short time I should love none;
Who on one well lov'd feeds, yet,
Once being cloy'd, of all, loaths it;
Would'st thou be subject to a fate
To make me change my love, to hate?
Blame me not then, since 'tis for love
Of thee, that I inconstant prove.

And yet in truth 'tis constancy,
For which I am accus'd by thee;
To nature those inconstant are,
Who fix their love on one that's faire;
Why did she, but for our delight,
Present such numbers to our sight;
'Mongst all the earthly Kings, theres none
Contented with one Crown alone.

Dancer's two translated plays - the one from Corneille and the other from Quinault - are in rhyming couplets. The original "love verses" at the close of the translation of Tasso's Amintas are "writ in imitation of Mr. Cowley's 'Mistris'".

Dancer's works are as follows:

1. Aminta, the Famous Pastoral [by Tasso], translated into English verse, with divers Ingenious Poems, London, 1660.
2. Nicomede, a tragicomedy translated out of the French of Monsieur Corneille, as it was acted at the Theatre Royal, Dublin, London, 1671. This was published by Francis Kirkman 'in the author's absence', and dedicated by Kirkman to Thomas, Earl of Ossory. To the play Kirkman added a valuable appendix—A true, perfect, and exact Catalogue of all the Comedies, Tragedies, Tragicomedies, Pastorals, Masques, and Interludes that were ever yet printed and published till this present year 1671.
3. Judgment on Alexander and Cæsar, and also on Seneca, Plutarch, and Petronius, from the French of Renaud Rapin, London 1672.
4. The Comparison of Plato and Aristotle, with the Opinions of the Fathers on their Doctrine, and some Christian Reflections, from the French, London 1673; dedicated to James, Duke of Ormonde.
5. Mercury Gallant, containing many true and pleasant relations of what hath passed at Paris from January 1st 1672 till the king's departure thence, from the French, London 1673; dedicated to George Bowerman.
6. Agrippa, King of Alba, or the False Tiberinus. As it was several times acted with great applause before the Duke of Ormonde, L.L. of Ireland, at the Theatre Royal in Dublin; from the French of Monsieur Quinault, London 1675; dedicated to Ormonde's daughter Mary.

== Appraisal ==
According to Leslie Birkett Marshall, Dancer's original poems, appended to the translation of Aminta, are "light, competent lyrics of inconstancy, farewells, resolutions and persuasions to love". Alastair Fowler included one of them ("The Variety") in his Oxford poetry anthology, The New Oxford Book of Seventeenth Century English Verse, 1991.
