= John Dauncey =

English author and translator (fl. 1660–1663)

John Dancey or Dauncy (fl. 1660–1663) was an English author and translator.

== Identity ==
Dauncey is usually described as 'Gent.' on his title-pages. John Dancer is often erroneously credited with his publications.

== Works ==
Dauncey wrote a history of Charles II from the death of his father, 1660, dedicated to the Marquis of Dorchester; a life of Queen Henrietta Maria, 1660; and A Compendious Chronicle of the Kingdom of Portugal, 1661. He translated Péréfixe's Histoire de Henri le Grand in 1663, and published in the same year a broad-sheet in verse, entitled Work for Cooper, an attack on a Presbyterian pamphleteer.
