= Andrew Dalton (countertenor) =

Andrew Dalton (born Andrew Bowman, September 29, 1950) is an Australian countertenor and voice teacher.

== Biography ==
Andrew Bowman was born on September 29, 1950, in Melbourne, Australia. His mother was a music teacher, and his brother was the Australian stage actor John Bowman (1947–1996). He adopted the performance name Andrew Dalton to avoid confusion with countertenor James Bowman.

Andrew moved to Buderim with his family at the age of four, and grew up in Queensland. His decision to become a countertenor occurred naturally. He was active as a boy soprano in Buderim in his youth, and after his voice dropped continued to sing in the soprano range using falsetto. He initially studied voice in Brisbane, and in 1972 he won the ABC Instrumental and Vocal Competition. A grant from the Australia Council funded further voice studies in London, and not long after arriving in London he made his recital debut at Wigmore Hall.

In 1974 Dalton sang a concert with soprano Dinah Harris and pianist Geoffrey Parsons at St Martin-in-the-Fields, and made his opera debut in Francesco Provenzale's La Stellidaura vendicante at the Vadstena Academy. This was followed by performances in several Baroque period operas at theaters in Innsbruck, Munich, Bern and Amsterdam. He worked frequently as a guest soloist with the Drottningholm Baroque Ensemble at the Drottningholm Palace Theatre in his early career. In 1977 he portrayed Orpheus in John Tasker's staging of Gluck's Orfeo ed Euridice with the Canberra Opera Company. In 1982 he performed the part of Lidio in the UK premiere of Francesco Cavalli's L'Egisto Scottish Opera at the Theatre Royal, Glasgow.

In November 1985 Dalton's family flew out to London to watch him perform the role of Athamas in Handel's Semele for at the Royal Opera House (ROH); only to have the performances cancelled at the list minute due to a contract dispute between the theater and its orchestra. A month earlier he had been a soloist in Handel's Messiah at the ROH under the baton of Charles Mackerras. In 1987 he portrayed Fernando in Conti's Don Chisciotte in Sierra Morena at the Buxton Festival. He gave his first performance at La Scala in Niccolò Jommelli's Fetonte in 1988, and that same year performed in Monteverdi's Il ritorno d'Ulisse in patria at the Théâtre du Jorat.

According to Elizabeth Forbes, he achieved particular success in the role of Oberon in Benjamin Britten's A Midsummer Night's Dream; a part he sang at opera houses in Basle, Cologne, Lübeck, Karlsruhe, and Linz. Some of the other operas he has performed in include Death in Venice (as Apollo), Jommelli's La schiava liberata, Handel's Agrippina and Handel's Ariodante among others. In 1994 he portrayed Tolomeo in Handel's Giulio Cesare with Opera Australia. He was a soloist with the Australian Chamber Orchestra in a concert of early music in 1997.

Dalton lived in Europe until 1991 when he returned to Australia. He joined the voice faculty of Australian National University (ANU). He was serving as the head of ANU's voice department when he was awarded an Australian Artists Creative Fellowship by the Keating administration in 1995. He later taught on the voice faculty of the Sydney Conservatorium of Music.
