= Il rapimento di Cefalo =

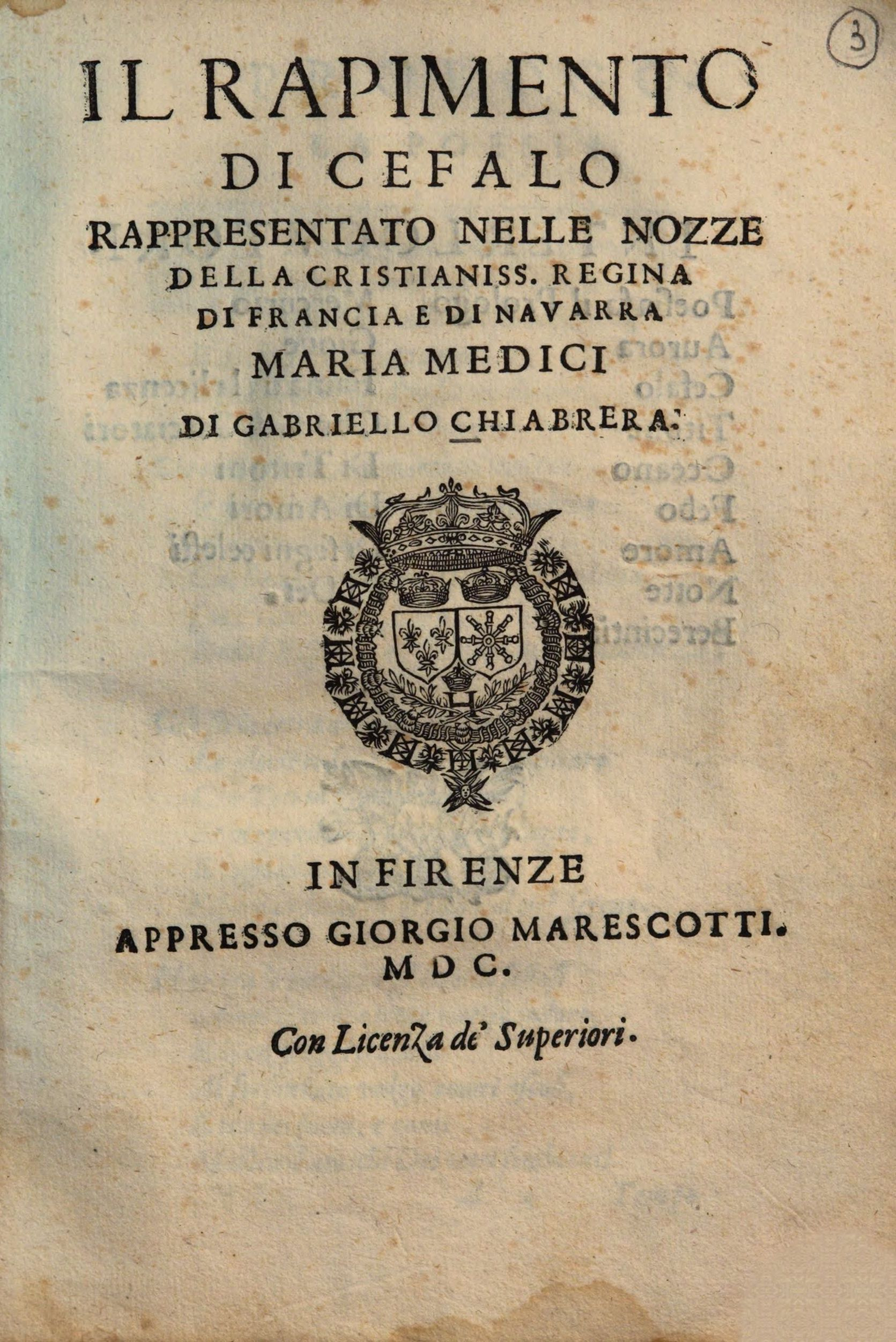
Libretto, by Gabriello Chiabrera

Il rapimento di Cefalo (The Abduction of Cephalus) was one of the first Italian operas. Most of the music was written by Giulio Caccini but Stefano Venturi del Nibbio, Luca Bati and Piero Strozzi also contributed. The libretto, by Gabriello Chiabrera, is in a prologue, five scenes and an epilogue and is based on the Classical myth of Cephalus and Aurora.

The opera was the culmination of the celebrations for the (proxy) wedding of King Henri IV of France and Marie de' Medici in Florence in 1600 and was performed in the Sala delle Commedie in the Uffizi Palace on 9 October in front of an audience of 3,000 gentlemen and 800 ladies. The performance lasted five hours and cost 60,000 scudi, a huge sum. Among the singers were Melchior Palantrotti, Jacopo Peri, Francesco Rasi and five members of Caccini's own family, including his daughter Francesca and his son Pompeo.

Three days earlier, Caccini and Peri's opera Euridice had been staged in the Pitti palace. Unlike that work, Il rapimento soon fell into obscurity. Caccini published the final chorus and an aria in his collection Le nuove musiche (1602) but the rest of the score is lost. Il rapimento di Cefalo contained many elements from the Florentine intermedi as well as making use of the new style of recitative. The Florentine audience admired the scenery of the production (by Bernardo Buontalenti), but found the music tedious.

== Roles ==
This is a hypothetical cast list with probable voice types as reconstructed by Tim Carter. In his description of the performance, Michelangelo Buonarotti the Younger claimed that four female members of the Caccini family ("with angelic voices") took part. Carter believes that the most likely candidates are: Caccini's second wife, Margherita di Agostino Benevoli della Scala; his 13-year-old daughter Francesca Caccini; Margherita Gagnolanti, his sister-in-law by his first wife; and Ginevra Mazziere detta l’Azzurina, who had been seduced or raped by his son, Pompeo, whom she may have married.

Role	Voice type (hypothetical)	Premiere cast (hypothetical), 9 October 1600
Poesia (Poetry)	soprano	Female Caccini 1
Aurora	soprano	Female Caccini 2
Cefalo (Cephalus)	tenor	Pompeo Caccini
Titone (Tithonus)	bass	Melchior Palantrotti
Oceano (Oceanus)	bass	Florentine bass
Febo (Phoebus)	tenor	Jacopo Peri or Francesco Rasi (doubled with Giove?)
Amore (Cupid)	soprano	Florentine boy singer or castrato
Notte (Night)	soprano	Female Caccini 3
Berecintia (Berecyntia)	soprano	Female Caccini 4
Mercurio (Mercury)	?tenor	Florentine tenor (or Peri or Rasi)
Giove (Jupiter)	tenor	Jacopo Peri or Francesco Rasi (doubled with Febo?)
Fama (Fame)	soprano	Female Caccini 1
Chorus of hunters, chorus of sea gods, chorus of heavenly signs, chorus of gods

== Sources ==
- Tim Carter: Rediscovering Il rapimento di Cefalo (Journal of Seventeenth-Century Music Volume 9 No.1)
- Music and Theatre from Poliziano to Monteverdi by Nino Pirrotta (Cambridge University Press, 1982) pp.236–38
- Italian Opera by David R. B. Kimbell (Cambridge University Press, 1994) p.53
- The Viking Opera Guide, ed. Holden (Viking, 1993) p.175
- New Grove Dictionary of Music entry on Il rapimento di Cefalo by Barbara Russano Hanning
- Catherine Deutsch, "Restituer l’instrumentation du Rapimento di Cefalo", Analyse Musicale LXXII (2013), pp. 21–29.
