= Domenico Belli =

Italian composer

Domenico Belli (died May 1627 in Florence) was an Italian composer who worked at the Basilica of San Lorenzo, Florence from 1610–13. He is most notable for his setting of the Pianto d'Orfeo (or Orfeo dolente) by the Camerata poet Gabriello Chiabrera as five intermedii for Torquato Tasso's Aminta, at Florence in 1616. This was recorded by Le Poème Harmonique under the direction of Vincent Dumestre in 2008.
