= Antonius Janue =

Italian composer

Antonius Janue (?Antonio da Genova) (fl. ca. 1460) was an Italian composer of the Renaissance. He was one of few known Italian composers of polyphony in the middle of the 15th century, and left one of the few manuscripts of the time in the composer's own hand, showing erasures and corrections.

== Life ==
Little is known with certainty about his life. He may be the same as Antonio da Genova, a musician who worked in Ferrara in 1462, and he is probably the "Antonius de Jan." referenced in the archives of the Genoese ducal palace in 1456; "Janue" has been interpreted as meaning "of Genoa." If these are the same person, he would seem to have been an active composer in northern Italy in the 1450s.

He may have been a priest, given the common use of the "p." prefix in the manuscript sources, and also considering that he seems to have written only sacred music.

Janue probably compiled the manuscript I-Fn 112bis, now in the Biblioteca Nazionale Centrale in Florence. The manuscript contains pieces by Guillaume Dufay, Gilles Binchois, John Dunstaple, and others, in addition to 16 pieces attributed to Janue himself. Since he has more pieces in the manuscript than anyone else, including the most famous names of the time, and many of the pieces signed "Janue" contain erasures and emendations, it is presumed that he was not only the copyist but did some of his composing during the compilation process. Many of the changes are reductions in complexity, suggesting that he was revising the works for less advanced singers. It has been suggested that the manuscript was put together in Genoa, since his name appears on the payment register of the Genoese ducal palace in 1456, as receiving an annual salary.

== Music ==
Thirteen pieces are attributed directly to Janue in the I-Fn 112bis manuscript: eight hymns for Vespers, two settings of the Magnificat, two processional hymns, and a laude. Stylistically they are polyphonic, usually for three voices, and rather simple in texture compared to the work of the Burgundian and Franco-Flemish composers of the same time. Janue often writes in fauxbourdon (in a similar manner to Dufay and Binchois), and occasionally uses imitation. Transcriptions of Janue's music in modern notation usually have to use irregular meters in order to capture his metrical freedom.

Some of his works, for example the setting of the Magnificat on Tone VI, were probably intended as replacements for equivalent settings by Dufay – perhaps because the originals were too hard for inexperienced singers.

== Works ==
- Lucis Creator optime
- Christe Redemptor omnium
- Crucifixum in carne (1) (anon in source; attrib)
- Crucifixum in carne (2) (anon in source; attrib)
- Gloria laus et honor
- Hostis Herodes impie
- Deus tuorum militum
- Iste confessor Domini
- Jesu, corona Virginum
- Quem terra pontus
- Ut queant laxis
- Magnificat (Tone V)
- Magnificat (Tone VI) (anon in source; attrib)
- Magnificat (Tone VII)
- Magnificat (Tone VIII) (anon in source; attrib)
- O redemptor, sume carmen (anon in source; attrib)
- Pange lingua (anon in source; attrib)
- Sanctorum meritis inclyta gaudia (anon in source; attrib)
- Verbum caro factum est
