= Stefano Venturi del Nibbio =

Italian composer

Stefano Venturi del Nibbio (fl. 1592–1600) was an Italian composer of the late Renaissance, active in Venice and Florence. In addition to composing madrigals in a relatively conservative style, works which were published as far away as England, he collaborated with Giulio Caccini on one of the earliest operas, Il rapimento di Cefalo (1600).

Very little is known about Venturi del Nibbio's life. In 1592 he was in Venice, presumably to supervise the printing of his first two books of madrigals (Il primo libro de madrigali, and Il primo libro de madrigali pastorali, both for five voices), and in 1593 or 1594 he moved to Florence. After 1594 his known musical connections are all Florentine, and no unambiguous mentions of his name after 1600 have yet been found.

He had a reputation as a skilful composer of vocal music, both secular and sacred, in the conservative polyphonic style in a time and place in which a new musical style was quickly developing: monody, and the stile rappresentativo, developments which in retrospect demarcated the beginning of the Baroque era in music. In 1600 he collaborated with one of the chief practitioners of this new style, Caccini, in the music for the opera Il rapimento di Cefalo, by composing two choruses; since they are lost along with most of the music for the opera, it is not known to what degree they may have borrowed from the new musical language. Also in 1600, Venturi wrote some sacred music, for two choirs, for the nuptial banquet celebrated in the Duomo on 5 October for the marriage of Henri IV of France and Maria de' Medici.

Venturi published a total of five books of madrigals. The earliest book, Il primo libro de madrigali of 1592, included two madrigals which were published in London with English words, one by Thomas Morley in his 1598 Madrigals to Five Voyces. In the introduction to the book Morley praised the work, and Venturi himself, as an exemplary composer of madrigals.
