= Eugène Green =

American screenwriter

- Born: 28 June 1947 (age 79); New York City, US
- Occupations: Filmmaker, dramatist, writer

Eugène Green (born 28 June 1947) is an American-born French filmmaker and dramatist. He is notable as an educator, training a generation of young actors in the revival of French baroque theatre technique and declamation.

== Films ==
- 2001 : Toutes les nuits; Alexis Loret, Christelle Prot, Adrien Michaux
- 2002 : Le nom du feu (short); Christelle Prot et Alexis Loret
- 2003 : Le Monde vivant; Christelle Prot, Adrien Michaux, Alexis Loret, Laurène Cheilan, Achille Trocellier, Marin Charvet, seen at the 2004 edition of Bafici
- 2004 : Le Pont des Arts; Natacha Régnier, Denis Podalydès, Adrien Michaux, Olivier Gourmet
- 2006 : Les signes (short); Christelle Prot, Mathieu Amalric, Achille Trocellier, Marin Charvet
- 2007 : Correspondances (short); Delphine Hecquet, François Rivière, Christelle Prot
- 2009 : La Religieuse portugaise; Leonor Baldaque, Adrien Michaux
- 2014 : La Sapienza; Fabrizio Rongione, Christelle Prot, Ludovico Succio, Arianna Nastro
- 2015 : Faire la parole (documentary)
- 2016 : Le Fils de Joseph
- 2017 : En attendant les barbares
- 2020 : Atarrabi et Mikelats

== Stage director ==
various presentations of baroque theatre including:

- Jean Racine: Mithridate at the chapel of the Sorbonne 1999.
- Pierre Corneille: La Suivante 1634 (Avignon, 1993; Paris, 1996), Le Cid (Avignon, Paris, 1995), La Place royale ou l'amoureux extravagant (Avignon, Marseille, Paris, 1996).

Opera

- Jean-Philippe Rameau: Castor et Pollux (National Theatre, Prague, 1999).

== Actor ==
- 2006 : Les Amitiés maléfiques; fr:Emmanuel Bourdieu
- Fragments sur la grâce; Vincent Dieutre.

== Own plays ==
- Julien le pauvre
- La Parole dans le jardin
- 1995 : Le Rêve dans le petit fer à cheval
- La Pastorale du jardin du Luxembourg
- La Vieille Charité

== Spoken word recordings ==
- 1999 : La Conversation: poems of Théophile de Viau with Vincent Dumestre performing works by Robert de Visée on the theorbo
- 2001 : La Parole baroque, CD accompanying book. Declamation of Jean de La Fontaine, Le chêne et le roseau; Torquato Tasso, La mort de Clorinda (La Gerusalemme liberata); Théophile de Viau, La Mort de Pyrame; William Shakespeare, The Death of Kings (Richard II), To be or not to be (Hamlet); Jacques-Bénigne Bossuet, Qu'est-ce que notre être (excerpt from Sermon sur la mort); Jean Racine, Je ne croiray point? (excerpt from Mithridate).
- 2002 : baroque declamation of Sermon sur la mort by Jacques-Bénigne Bossuet at Saint-Étienne-du-Mont.
- 2003 : Présences: Essai sur la nature du cinéma (spoken word)
- 2007 : baroque declamation of Charles Perrault, six tales from Contes de ma mère l'Oye, Alpha 922.

== Non-Fiction ==
- 2001 : La parole baroque
- 2004 : Le présent de la parole. Les lieux communs.
- 2009 : Poétique du cinématographe
- 2010 : La religieuse portugaise
- 2011 : La communauté universelle
- 2015 : L'Ami du chevalier de Pas, portrait subjectif de Fernando Pessoa

== Fiction ==
- 2003 : La rue des Canettes : Cinq contes
- 2008 : La Reconstruction
- 2009 : La Bataille de Roncevaux
- 2012 : Les Atticistes
- 2014 : Un conte du Graal
- 2015 : L'inconstance des démons
