= Antonio Sartorio =

Italian composer (1630–1680)

Antonio Sartorio (1630 – 30 December 1680) was a composer active mainly in the Republic of Venice and in the Principality of Calenberg. He was a leading composer of operas in his native Venice in the 1660s and 1670s and was also known for composing in other genres of vocal music. Between 1665 and 1675 he spent most of his time in Hanover, where he held the post of Kapellmeister to Duke Johann Friedrich of Brunswick-Lüneburg – returning frequently to Venice to compose operas for the Carnival. In 1676 he became vice maestro di capella at San Marco in Venice.

== Early work in Italy and work as Kapellmeister ==
Duke Johann Friedrich of Brunswick-Lüneburg

Sartorio was the brother of composer and organist Gasparo Sartorio and architect Girolamo Sartorio who also had connections with the theatre. Beyond birth records, the first known information about Sartorio relates to the mounting of his first opera, Gl'amori infruttuosi di Pirro, at the Teatro di San Giovanni Grisostomo in Venice on 4 January 1661. His second opera, Seleuco, did not come until five years later when it was produced at the Teatro San Luca on 16 January 1666. The year before, he had been appointed to the position of Kapellmeister to Duke Johann Friedrich of Brunswick-Lüneburg; just months after the duke had assumed authority over the Principality of Calenberg upon his elder brother Georg Wilhelm's inheriting of the Principality of Lüneburg. Friedrich ruled over the Calenberg subdivision of the duchy from 1665 until his death in 1679, fourteen years later.

Friedrich was a highly intelligent and educated sovereign who had converted to Roman Catholicism in 1651. Upon becoming duke, he instituted the Catholic rite to his court, which accordingly led to his choice of Sartorio, a Catholic, as Kapellmeister. The duke had met Sartorio upon one of his four visits to Italy, one of which was for the purpose of lending the Republic of Venice substantial military aid against the Turks. Sartorio began his duties as Kapellmeister on Trinity Sunday 1666 not too long after the Duke's new palace in Herrenhausen near Hanover was finished. The palace's design was inspired by the Palace of Versailles and is famous for its gardens, the Herrenhausen Gardens.

As Kapellmeister, Sartorio had at his disposal six instrumentalists and seven or eight singers, the majority of which were Italian. For the group, Sartorio composed music for the Kapelle, a missa brevis, and several vesper psalms and cantatas in both the stile antico and the stile moderno. In addition, the group's repertory included masses, motets and psalms by Henri Dumont, Bonifatio Gratiani and Orazio Tarditi. Some of the group's music was discovered in 1958 in an organ bellows in the village of Hüpede.

== Trips home to Venice ==
Sartorio worked in Hanover up until 1675, during which time he returned frequently to Venice in the winter, both to compose operas for Carnival and to hire musicians for service at court. His first trip back to his native city was in 1666–1667. During this time his remarkable duo operas, La prosperità d'Elio Seiano and La caduta d'Elio Seiano, were produced on 15 January and 3 February 1667. Originally the librettist, Nicolò Minato, had intended for the two works to be performed on successive evenings, but it appears that either Sartorio or the theatre management overturned this decision.

Sartorio's second visit to Venice was for the Carnival of 1669–1670, during which his next opera, L'Ermengarda regina de' longobardi, was performed. The librettist, Pietro Dolfin, a friend of both Sartorio and Duke Johann Friedrich, administered the duke's theatre loges and corresponded regularly with him between 1669 and 1678. Sartorio’s next stay in Venice lasted an entire year, from January or February 1672 to Carnival 1672–1673. On 19 February 1672 his well known opera L'Adelaide was given for the first time. The libretto was again by Dolfin, who later reworked some of Gissilla's arias into a cantata by adding recitatives. Sartorio seems to have responded to Dolfin's wish to have the recitatives set, for a Cantata di Gissilla is extant; it was apparently conceived for a pupil of Dolfin's named Lucretia, who had sung a role in the opera, probably that of Gissilla.

Sartorio was supposed to return to Hanover at the end of the season in which L'Adelaide premiered, but poor health prevented him from travelling. He was further motivated to stay by an invitation to write one of two operas to be performed at the Teatro di San Luca during the next Carnival season. The Duke assented to Sartorio's extended stay, largely because of a lengthy and persuasive correspondence by Dolfin, who expressed concerns over Sartorio's physical health and emphasized the honour of being asked to compose the opera. Sartorio thereupon offered L'Orfeo, a variation on the myth of Orpheus and Eurydice with comic interludes and elaborate sub-plots featuring such incongruous characters as Hercules, Achilles, and Thetis. This work premiered on 14 December 1672. For the theatre's second opera of the season, Francesco Cavalli was commissioned. Cavalli was then near the end of a long and successful career as an operatic composer. However, when his newest work, Massenzio, went into rehearsal, it was found unsuitable by the theatre managers "for lack of spirited ariettas." They therefore assigned Sartorio the task of writing his own music to the same libretto just 13 days before the opera premiered on 25 January 1673. Sartorio wrote 78 arias and duets to fulfil his assignment.

== Later life in Italy ==
After spending two more years in Hanover, Sartorio left the service of Duke Johann Friedrich permanently in April 1675, although he still called himself Friedrich's court composer in the manuscripts of his remaining operas and in other documents. Upon his departure, the Duke gave him a gift of 50 thalers and a golden chain. The two men remained on good terms and corresponded often with each other about negotiations with singers or visits on his behalf to cloistered ladies.

Sartorio settled in Venice in 1675, taking up residence in the San Giovanni Grisostomo quarter of the city. He won the position of vice maestro di cappella of the St Mark's Basilica, narrowly defeating Carlo Grossi for the post and assuming his position there on 7 May 1676. A set of eight-part psalms for two choirs that he wrote for the basilica were published in 1680; notably being his only printed volume of music. On 17 December 1676, his opera Giulio Cesare in Egitto premiered in Venice to a resounding success. He composed four more operas between 1677 and 1679.

Sartorio was supposed to have been visited by Duke Friedrich in early 1680, but the duke died on 18 December 1679 in Augsburg at the start of his fifth journey to Italy. Towards the end of 1680, Sartorio began composing another opera, La Flora, but he died before he could finish the work. He had been ill for seven months prior to his death. The Teatro San Angelo had commissioned La Flora, and not wanting to give it up, hired Marc'Antonio Ziani to finish it. The opera was eventually performed at that house as the first opera of the new Carnival season. Giovanni Legrenzi succeeded him as vice maestro di cappella of the St Mark's Basilica.

== Selected list of works ==
- Gl'amori infruttuosi di Pirro (1661)
- Seleuco (1666)
- L'Ermengarda regina de' longobardi
- L'Adelaide (1672)
- Alcina (1674-5) (libretto written by Pietro Dolfin for Sartorio, but never set to music)
- Anacreonte tirano (1677)
- Ercole sul Termodonte (1678)
- Antonio e Pompeiano (1677)
- Elio Seiano (1667) (A double bill or "La prosperita d'Elio Seinano" and "La caduta d'Elio Seiano")
- La Flora (1680, unfinished, completed by Marc Antonio Ziani)
- Giulio Cesare in Egitto (1676)
- Massenzio (1673)
- L'Orfeo (1672)

== Recordings ==
There is one recording of Giulio Cesare in Egitto, conducted by Attilio Cremonesi (ORF CD409 (3CDs)), and also several recordings of L'Orfeo, including a live recording from the Muziekcentrum Vredenburg, Utrecht, directed by Stephen Stubbs: Vanguard 99194 (2CDs) another, also directed by Stephen Stubbs, on Channel Classics Records 722020, plus one by René Clemencic on Warner Classics 867384103 (3CDs).

== Sources ==
- Edward H. Tarr. "Sartorio [Sertorio], Antonio", Grove Dictionary of Music and Musicians (1980)
- Vassilis Vavoulis, ‘Antonio Sartorio (c.1630–1680): Documents and sources of a career in seventeenth-century Venetian opera’, Royal Musical Association Research Chronicle, 37 (2004), 1–70
- Vassilis Vavoulis, ‘Nel theatro di tutta l’Europa’: Venetian-Hanoverian patronage in 17th-century Europe (Lucca, 2010)
- Reinmar Emans, 'Zwischen Hannover und Venedig. Die Hannoveraner Hofkapelle unter Antonio Sartorio', in Musik und Vergnügen am Hohen Ufer. Fest- und Kulturtransfer zwischen Hannover und Venedig in der frühen Neuzeit, eds. S. Meine, N.K. Strohmann, and T.C. Weißmann (Regensburg, 2016), 275-290
