= Le Poème Harmonique =

Music ensemble

Le Poème Harmonique is a musical ensemble founded in 1998 by Vincent Dumestre to recreate and promote early music, in particular that of the 17th century. Using rare instruments such as the theorbo, the lirone, the tiorbino and the arpa tripla, Le Poème Harmonique aims to recapture the poetry of early music, particularly of the late renaissance and early baroque era. The early 17th-century French and Italian madrigal is a special interest. Le Poème Harmonique also teaches singers in collaboration with the Centre de Musique Baroque (Centre for Baroque Music) at Versailles. The group's recordings with the French Alpha record label of Jean-Paul Combet contributed to the critical and commercial establishment of the label, and included the 1st and 100th releases of the label's primary 'Ut Pictura Musica' series.

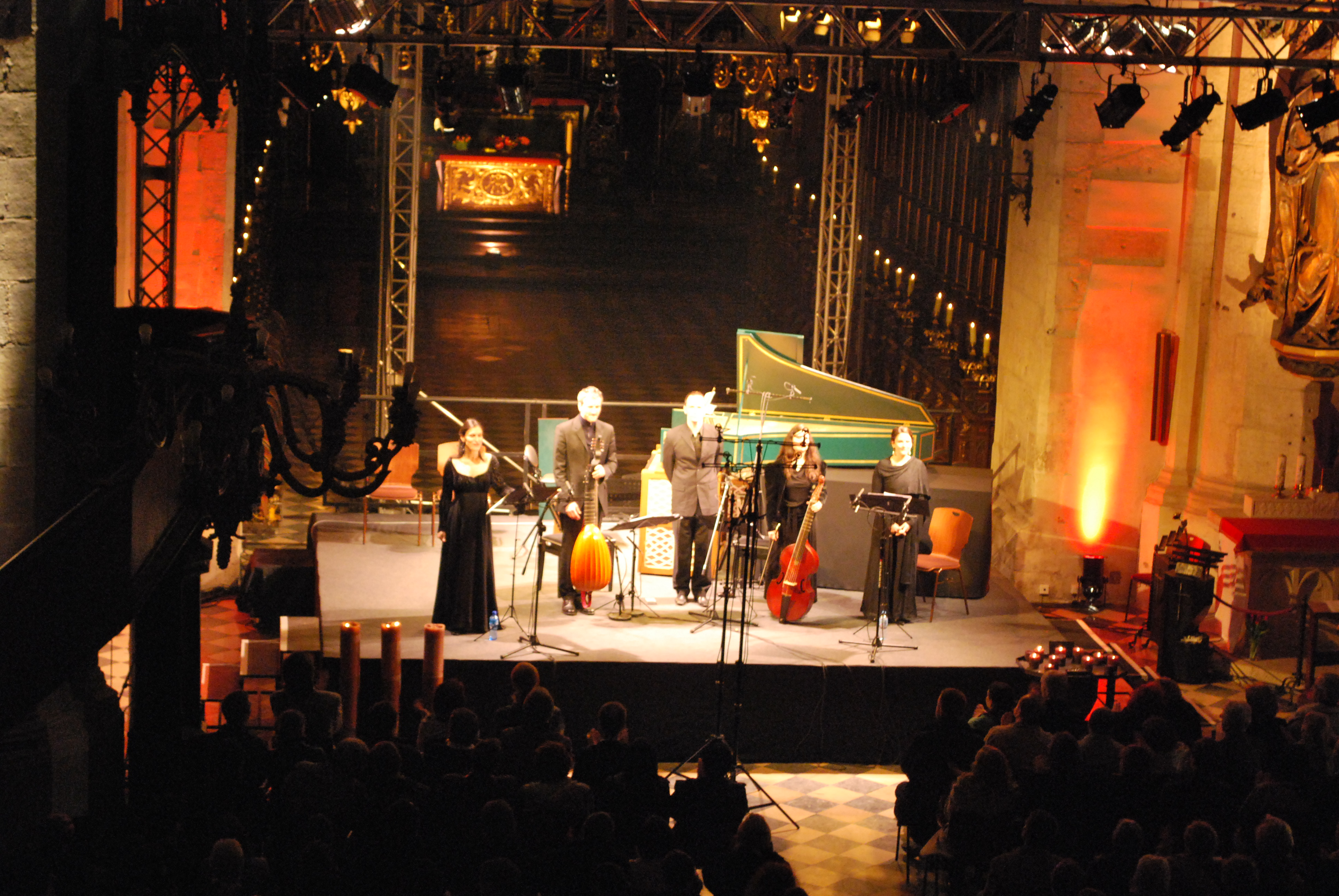
Le Poème Harmonique during a live concert in 2009

== Discography ==
- Emilio de Cavalieri: Lamentationes Hieremiae Prophetae, CD
- Charles Tessier: Carnets de Voyage, CD
- Étienne Moulinié: L'humaine comédie
- Robert de Visée: Pieces de Theorbe, CD
- Bellerofonte Castaldi: Le musiche di Bellerofonte Castaldi
- Domenico Belli: Il nuovo stile Guillemette Laurens
- La conversation: Robert de Visée Vincent Dumestre, and poems of Théophile de Viau declaimed by Eugène Green in Baroque French.
- Combattimenti!: Monteverdi. Marco Marazzoli La Fiera di Farfa: Alpha 172
- Pierre Guédron: Le Consert des Consorts, CD
- Il Fásolo?
- Firenze 1616: L'Orfeo Dolente by Domenico Belli, Claudio Saracini, Giulio Caccini and Cristofano Malvezzi
- Plaisir d'Amour: Claire Lefilliâtre, Brice Duisit, Isabelle Druet.
- Love is strange - English lute consort music by Anthony Holborne, Robert Parsons (composer), Thomas Robinson (composer), John Bull (composer), John Dowland, John Danyel, Orlando Gibbons, John Coprario, John Johnson (composer) and anonymous and traditional.
- fr:Aux marches du palais Romances & complaintes de la France d'autrefois
- Luis de Briceño: El Fénix de Paris
- Antoine Boësset: Je meurs sans mourir
- Michel Richard Delalande: 3 Leçons de ténèbres, with accompanying CD of Jacques-Bénigne Bossuet's Sermon sur la mort declaimed by Eugène Green in Baroque French.
- Daniel Brel Quatre chemins de mélancolie Le Poème Harmonique: Daniel Brel (bandoneon), viol consort, Vincent Dumestre (theorbo and direction)
- Nova Metamorfosi: Vincenzo Ruffo and Claudio Monteverdi
- Marc-Antoine Charpentier, Te Deum H.146, Jean-Baptiste Lully, Te Deum, Le Poème Harmonique & Capella Cracoviensis, conducted by Vincent Dumestre. CD Alpha 2013.
- G. B. Pergolesi: Stabat Mater. Patrizia Bovi (soprano), Pino de Vittorio (tenor), Bernard Arrieta (bass). Le Poème Harmonique, Les Pages & Les Chantres de la Chapelle, dir. Olivier Schneebeli

DVD

- Jean-Baptiste Lully: Cadmus et Hermione, DVD
- Jean-Baptiste Lully: Le Bourgeois Gentilhomme, 2 DVDs
