= Orfeo (Sartorio) =

Orfeo (Orpheus) is an opera in three acts by the Italian composer Antonio Sartorio. The libretto, by Aurelio Aureli, is based on the myth of Orpheus and Eurydice. It was first performed at the Teatro San Salvatore, Venice in 1672. With its clear division between arias (of which there are about 50) and recitative, the work marks a transition in style between the Venetian opera of Francesco Cavalli and the new form of opera seria. Modern reactions to the work have been mixed, with Tim Carter describing it as "a fairly dismal example of a genre with all the symptoms of terminal decline...[Orfeo]'s journey to Hades seems almost a Sunday-school outing...Whether satire or not, this is indeed a sorry tale."

== Roles ==
Role	Voice type	Premiere Cast
Orfeo (Orpheus)	soprano castrato	Francesco Maria Rascarini
Euridice (Eurydice)	soprano	Antonina Coresi
Aristeo (Aristaeus)	soprano castrato	
Autonoe	soprano	
Chirone (Chiron)	bass	
Achille (Achilles)	alto castrato	
Ercole (Hercules)	tenor	
Esculapio (Aesculapius)	bass	
Erinda	tenor (travesti role)	
Orillo	soprano castrato	
Bacco (Bacchus)	bass	
Pluto	bass	
Tetide (Thetis)	soprano	

== Synopsis ==
The plot is extremely complicated. Aristaeus is Orpheus's brother and he too is in love with Eurydice, which makes Orpheus jealous. Aristaeus rejects the love of Autonoe who disguises herself as a gypsy to be near him and enlists the help of Achilles and Hercules. The jealous Orpheus plans to have Eurydice murdered in a forest but Eurydice dies when she steps on a snake while trying to flee Aristaeus. Orpheus sets off for the underworld to bring Eurydice back to life. Pluto, the ruler of the underworld, is won over by his singing and releases Eurydice on condition that Orpheus does not look at her before they have reached the land of the living. But Orpheus turns round and Eurydice is lost again. Aristaeus finally accepts the love of Autonoe and the two are married.

== Recordings ==
- Orfeo Ellen Hargis, Suzie Le Blanc, Ann Hallenberg, Teatro Lirico, conducted by Stephen Stubbs (Vanguard Classics, 1999)

== Sources ==
- The Oxford Illustrated History of Opera ed. Roger Parker (OUP, 1994)
- Rosand, Ellen, Orfeo (iii), in Sadie, Stanley (ed.), The New Grove Dictionary of Opera, Grove (Oxford University Press), New York, 1997, III, p. 744 (ISBN 978-0-19-522186-2)
- Del Teatro (in Italian)
- Magazine de l'opéra baroque by Jean-Claude Brenac (in French)
