= Marc Mauillon =

French opera singer (b. 1980)

Marc Mauillon (born in 1980) is a French singer, sometimes tenor, sometimes baritone.

== Biography ==
Born in Montbéliard, Mauillon was nominated in the "Révélation Artiste Lyrique" category of the Victoires de la musique classique 2010. His work since travels through the spectrum of styles and eras.

While he is mainly recognized in the baroque repertoire, he is present in others as well: by Mozart, he was Papageno (The Magic Flute) and Guglielmo (Così fan tutte); in contemporary opera, he can be heard in Péter Eötvös's Le Balcon and Pascal Dusapin's Roméo et Juliette at the Opéra-Comique; he also engaged in operetta with Jacques Offenbach's La Vie parisienne and Manuel Rosenthal's Rayon des Soieries. Among the other roles he has played on stage, he embodied the husband in Francis Poulenc's Les mamelles de Tirésias, Debussy's Pelléas et Mélisande, at the Festival de la Meije, and his role in the premiere in Besançon of Offenbach's La Valse perdue (the lost Waltz).

In concert, Mauillon shows the same eclecticism, with a particular tenderness for early musics: he regularly works with Jordi Savall, the ensembles Alla Francesca and Doulce Mémoire, and had recorded works by Guillaume de Machaut, for the first time in their entirety, (Eloquencia): L'Amoureux Tourment (Diapason d'Or and R10 Classica Répertoire) and Le Remède de Fortune (diapason d'Or de l'année and Choc du Monde de la Musique) both praised by the public and critics.

He recently revived the role of Guglielmo in Così fan tutte and Monteverdi's Il combattimento di Tancredi e Clorinda in recordings and concerts with Le Poème Harmonique. With Les Arts Florissants he also performed at the salle Pleyel, the Arsenal de Metz, the Chapels of Versailles, and the Barbican Centre in London for a program of Grands Motets français, after having been the Spirit of Dido & Aeneas at the DNO of Amsterdam and the Barbican. He has toured Europe and North America under the direction of Jordi Savall.

== Prizes and distinctions ==
- Révélation Classique of the Adami in 2004
- Victoires de la musique classique 2010 - nomination in the "Révélation Lyrique" category
