= Orfeo dolente =

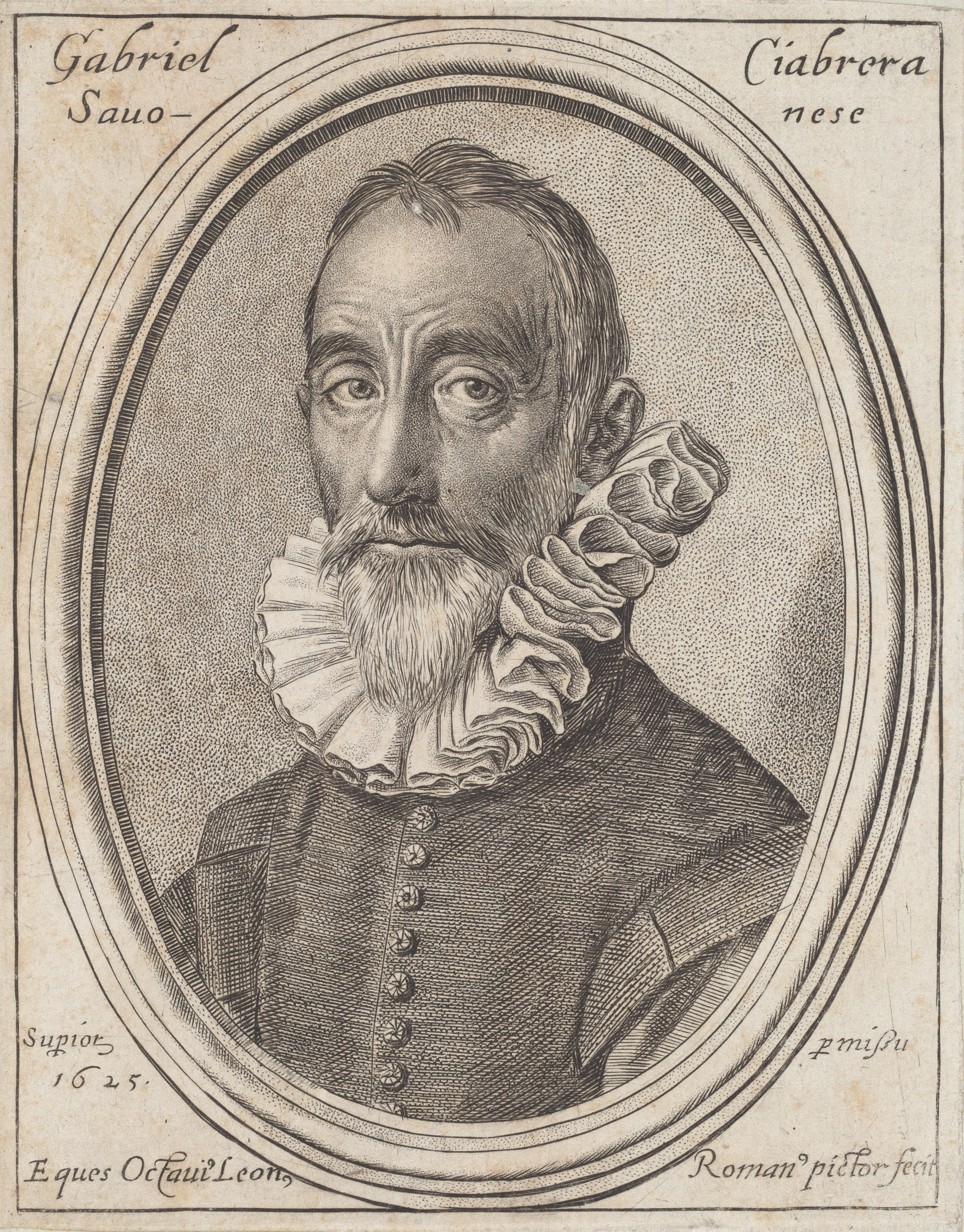
Gabriello Chiabrera, the librettist

Orfeo dolente (Orpheus inconsolable) is an opera by Domenico Belli to a libretto by Gabriello Chiabrera, an example of "representative style" of the early Baroque era. The work is divided into five interludes which were performed for the first time as intermedi in a performance of Torquato Tasso's play Aminta at the Palazzo della Gherardesca in Florence in 1616.

Operas based on the Orpheus myths, and especially the story of his journey to the underworld to rescue his wife, Eurydice, were amongst the earliest examples of the art form, Monteverdi's L'Orfeo is a notable example. Belli's work is regarded as one of the best examples of recitar cantando (acting while singing), a concept that had developed in the late 16th century.

Most of Belli's music has been lost. However, by virtue of his music in Orfeo dolente, he came to be seen as a "researcher of passions through music". In this work he tried different musical methods to express passions in adherence to the new requirements for court performances. He enriched the monodic formula by using violent dissonances, as be seen in his arias, including "Di vostri occhi" and "Ardo ma non ardisco". He has been described as sublime in the tragic. He emphasized this aspect by resisting the vocal embellishments used by his contemporaries.

Florentine by birth and with a similar approach to other "fathers" of opera such as Jacopo Peri, Giulio Caccini, Emilio de' Cavalieri and Marco da Gagliano, Belli worked on other aspects of court spectacles, such as dances, intermedi, and even a maritime fable on the history of Andromeda (music lost) which was highly praised by Giulio Caccini. He published two collections of music the same year as Orfeo dolente, Officium defunctorum and First Book of Arias. They are his only surviving works.

Orfeo dolente was transcribed by Francesco Malipiero in 1951, and by Bruno Maderna in 1968. A free edition was released by Musica Antica Rotherhithe in 2021 following its first complete performance in modern times in London, United Kingdom.

== See also ==
- List of Orphean operas
