= Sophie Watillon =

- Born: 7 December 1965; Namur, Belgium
- Died: 31 August 2005 (aged 39) Namur, Belgium
- Genres: Early music Baroque
- Occupation: Viola da gamba-player
- Instrument: Viola da gamba

Sophie Watillon (7 December 1965 – 31 August 2005) was a Belgian viol player who specialized in Baroque music. She was born in Namur, Belgium to a musical family. During her youth, the viola da gamba-soloist gained international fame with refined and sensitive solo interpretations of early music and baroque compositions for viola da gamba.

At the age of sixteen, she began studying music with Philippe Pierlot in Maastricht, and then further with Wieland Kuijken in Brussels and with Paolo Pandolfo at Schola Cantorum Basiliensis, Basel.

Besides her solo career, Watillon was a permanent member of Hesperion XXI, La Capella Reial de Catalunya and Le Concert des Nations of Jordi Savall. She played with various ensembles such as Il Seminario Musicale, Cantus Cölln, Le Poème Harmonique, Ricercar Consort, Stylus Phantasticus.

== Academic career ==
- Professor, viola da gamba, Catalonia College of Music, Barcelona

== Recordings ==
(labels: Alpha - Summit records - Ligia Digital - Ricercar - Cyprès)

- Recordings with Philippe Herreweghe
- Numerous recordings with Hesperion XXI, La Capella Reial de Catalunya and Le Concert des Nations, Jordi Savall

=== Recordings with Ricercar Consort ===
- 1988 : Deutsche Barock Kantaten (III) (Schein, Tunder, Buxtehude)
- 1989 : Deutsche Barock Kantaten (V) (Hammerschmidt, Selle Schein, Schütz, Tunder, Weckmann, Lübeck)
- 1989 : Motets à deux voix of Henri Dumont
- 1992 : Die familie Bach (with Collegium Vocale and Capella Sancti Michaelis)
- 1995 : Matthäus Passion (1672) of Johann Sebastiani (Deutsche Barock Kantaten XI)

=== Recordings done under the direction of Sophie Watillon ===
- 1994 : The Art of the Viola bastarda, song and dance in music for viol in Italy
  - Ortiz: Improvisations and Recercadas on La Folia, Doulce mémoire, The Passamezzo Antico, The Passamezzo Moderno
  - Sandrin: Doulce mémoire
  - Ruffa: La Danza, La Piva, La Gamba
  - Rore: Ancor che co'l partire
  - Dalla Casa: Rognoni
  - Bassani: Cosi le chiome
  - Bonizzi: Hellas comment
  - Selma Y Salaverde: Vestiva i colli
  - Corelli: Sonata La Follia, op. 5, no. 12
- 2000 : Pièces de viole - Pièces de Théorbe of Nicolas Hotman
- 2003 : Marin Marais - La Rêveuse, & Autres Pièces de Viole
- 2005 : Christopher Simpson - The Seasons, The Monthes & other divisions of Time - 1 (Alpha 088)

=== Recordings with Le Poème Harmonique ===
- 1999 : L'Humaine Comédie of Estienne Moulinié
- 2002 : Le Consert des Consorts of Pierre Guédron

=== Recordings with Stylus Phantasticus ===
- 2001 : Zeichen im Himmel of Philipp Heinrich Erlebach
