= The Portuguese Nun =

- Film poster
- French: La Religieuse Portugaise
- Directed by: Eugène Green
- Written by: Eugène Green
- Produced by: Sandro Aguilar
- Starring: Leonor Baldaque; Eugène Green; Diogo Dória; Ana Moreira
- Cinematography: Raphaël O'Byrne
- Edited by: Valérie Loiseleux
- Music by: Júlio de Sousa; João Fezas Vital
- Release dates: August 2009 (Montreal); 3 May 2010
- Running time: 127 minutes
- Countries: France; Portugal
- Languages: French; Portuguese

The Portuguese Nun (French: La Religieuse Portugaise) is a 2009 French-Portuguese film by Eugène Green.

== Plot ==
French actor Julie (Leonor Baldaque) travels to Lisbon to shoot a film based on the Letters of a Portuguese Nun. Though her mother was Portuguese, she has never visited Lisbon before, having always holidayed in Porto, and so she decides to make the most of the trip to explore the city. She encounters a variety of Lisbon's inhabitants: an orphan (Francisco Mozos), a suicidal aristocrat (Diogo Dória), the reincarnation of King Sebastião I (Carloto Cotta) and an enigmatic nun (Ana Moreira).

== Cast ==
- Leonor Baldaque as Julie
- Eugène Green as Denis Verde, the director
- Diogo Dória as D. Henrique Cunha
- Ana Moreira as Irma Joana, the nun
- Francisco Mozos as Vasco, the boy
- Adrien Michaux as Martin Dautand
- Beatriz Batarda as Madalena
- Carloto Cotta as D. Sebastião
