= La Sapienza (film) =

- Directed by: Eugène Green
- Written by: Eugène Green
- Produced by: La Sarraz Pictures; Mact Productions
- Starring: Fabrizio Rongione; Christelle Prot; Ludovico Succio; Arianna Nastro
- Cinematography: Raphaël O'Byrne
- Edited by: Valérie Loiseleux
- Music by: Dean McGinnes
- Release dates: August 8, 2014 (Locarno Film Festival); March 20, 2015
- Running time: 100 minutes
- Countries: France; Italy
- Languages: French; Italian

La Sapienza is French-Italian dramatic film by Eugène Green released in 2015.

The film derives its title from Sant'Ivo alla Sapienza — a Catholic church built in Rome in 1642–1660 by architect Francesco Borromini, widely considered a masterpiece of Roman Baroque architecture.

== Synopsis ==
Alexandre a renowned architect, journeys to Italy with his wife Alienor after receiving a prestigious award, with the intention of producing a book on Borromini. Alienor meanwhile feels that her relationship with Alexandre is gradually slipping away. Along the way, the two befriend a brother and sister, Goffredo and Lavinia. Goffredo is about to embark on a course of architectural studies and joins Alexandre on a trip to Turin and Rome to survey Borromini's great works.

It is a story of the rediscovery of the joys of life and overcoming anxieties. Therein Alexandre realizes that Borromini was searching for the light that he must bring back into his life to rekindle both his architectural practice and his marriage to his wife.

== Cast ==
- Fabrizio Rongione as Alexandre Schmidt
- Christelle Prot Landman as Aliénor Schmidt
- Ludovico Succio as Goffredo
- Arianna Nastro as Lavinia
- Hervé Compagne as Ministre
- Sabine Ponte as Isabelle
- Eugène Green as a Chaldean-Assyrian
