= Aminta =

1573 play by Torquato Tasso

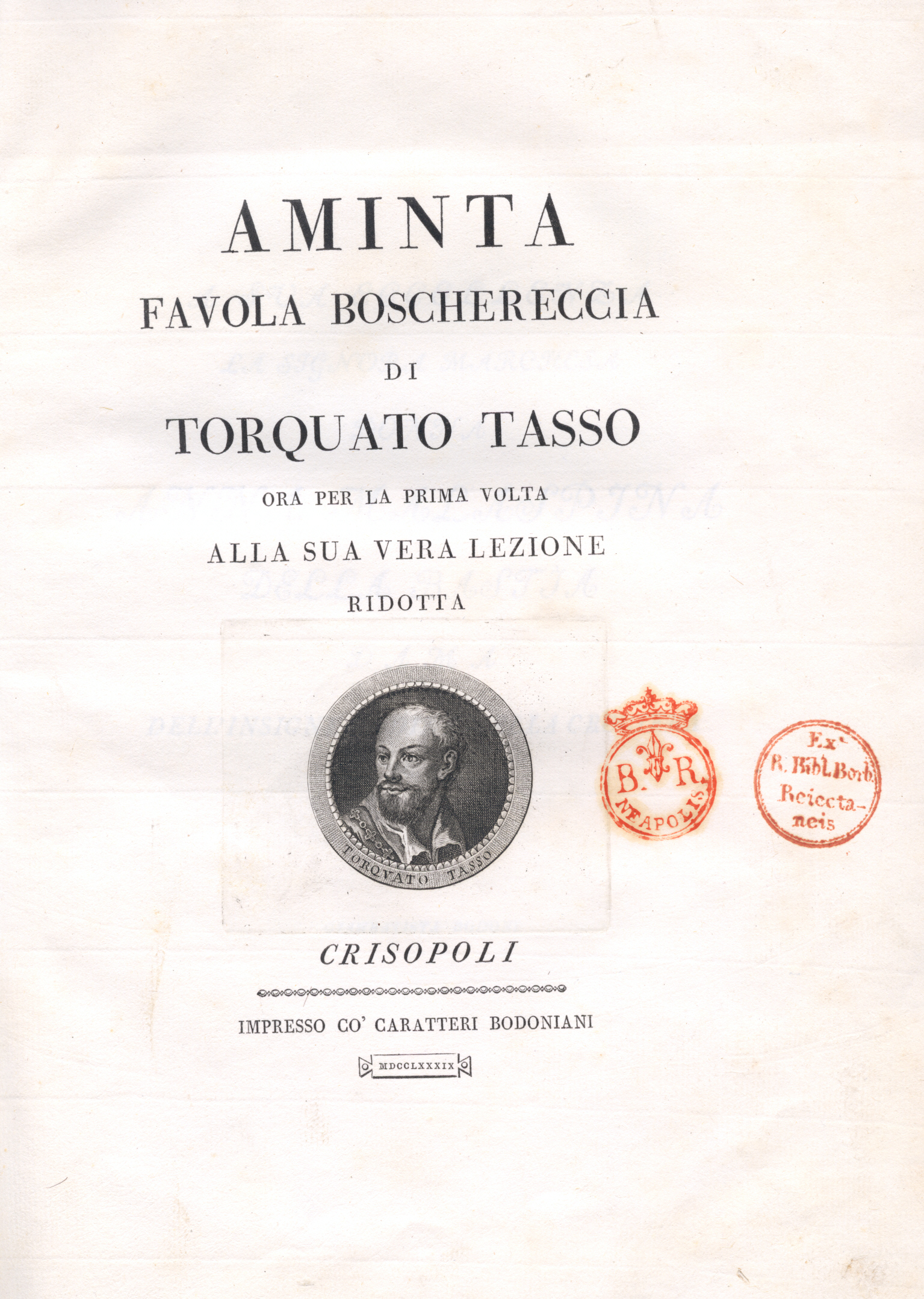
Title-page of a 1789 edition of Aminta printed at Parma

Aminta is a pastoral play written by Torquato Tasso in 1573, performed during a garden party at the court of Ferrara. Both the actors and the public were noble persons living at the Court, who could understand subtle allusions the poet made to that style of life, in contrast with the life of shepherds, represented in an idyllic way.

== Text ==
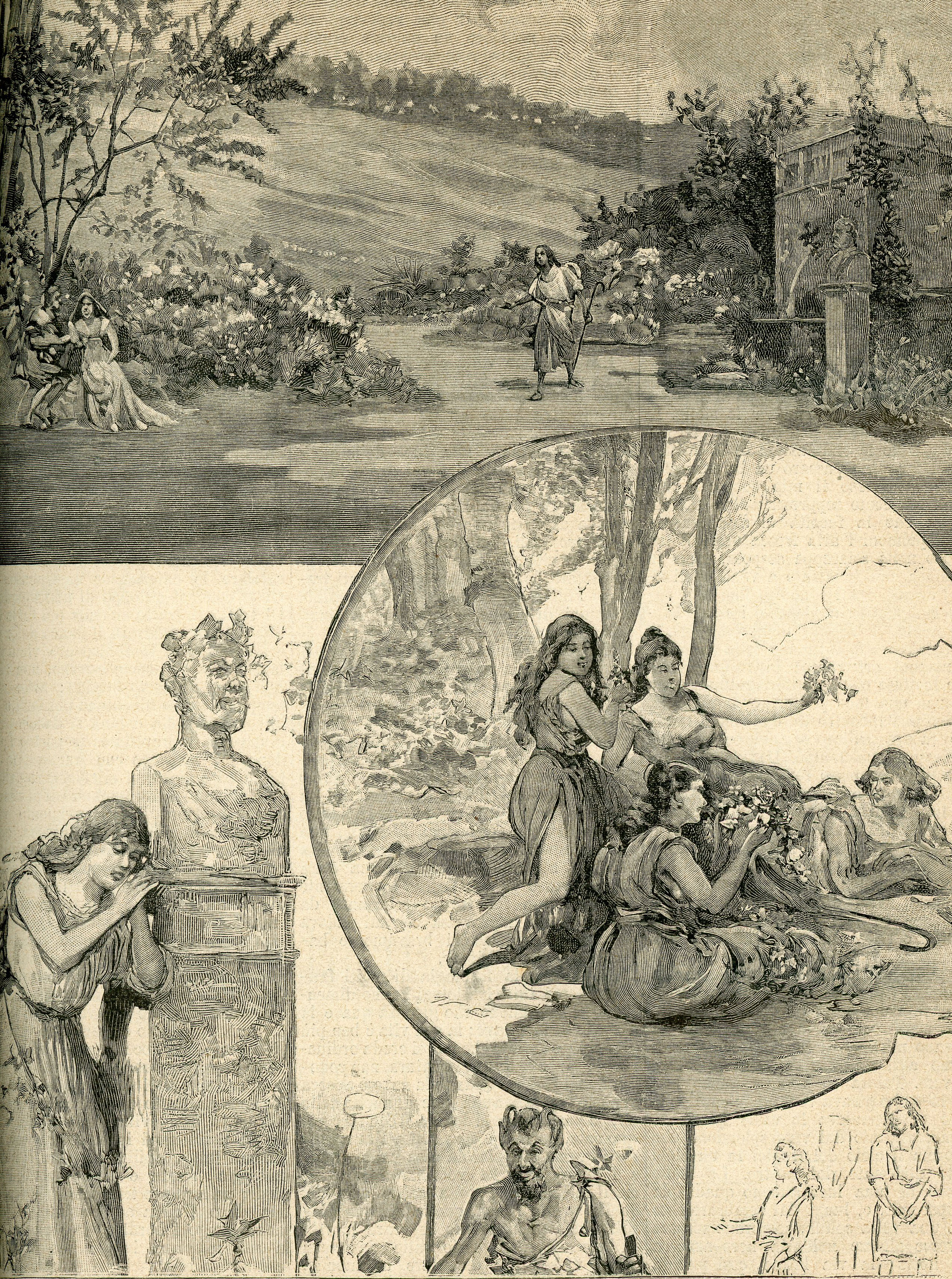
Scenes from Aminta (1895)

The text is written in hendecasyllabic and septenary verses; it is divided into five acts.

The play has a pastoral theme, and is set in the time of Alexander the Great. The characters are shepherds and nymphs.

The story is about Aminta's love for the beautiful nymph Silvia, who does not return his attentions and prefers hunting. She risks rape at the hands of a Satyr but Aminta saves her; however, again she flees from him. Aminta, finding her blood-stained veil, attempts to kill himself. Now Silvia is remorseful, comes back to cry over the body of Aminta, who is still alive, and the two can happily marry, following the advice that older and wiser friends had been giving them.

== Musical settings ==
It was the basis for several opera librettos, such as:

- The libretto by Metastasio on which Mozart based his opera Il re pastore (Salzburg, 1775)
- The libretto by Metastasio on which Antonio Mazzoni based his opera Aminta, il re pastore (Madrid, 1756)
- The plot of Delibes' ballet Sylvia, as re-written by Jules Barbier (Paris, 1876).

== Recording ==
A phonautogram of the play's opening lines is the oldest known audible record of human speech.

== Translations into English ==
- Aminta, the Famous Pastoral, translated into English verse, with divers Ingenious Poems. Trans. John Dancer. London: John Starkey, 1660.
- Amyntas, A Tale of the Woods. Trans. Leigh Hunt. London: T. and J. Allman, 1820.
- Aminta: A Pastoral Play. Trans. Charles Jernigan and Irene Marchegani Jones. New York: Italica Press, 2000.

== See also ==
- Sir Frederick Ashton's ballet Sylvia
