= Gabriello Chiabrera =

Italian poet and playwright, 1552–1638

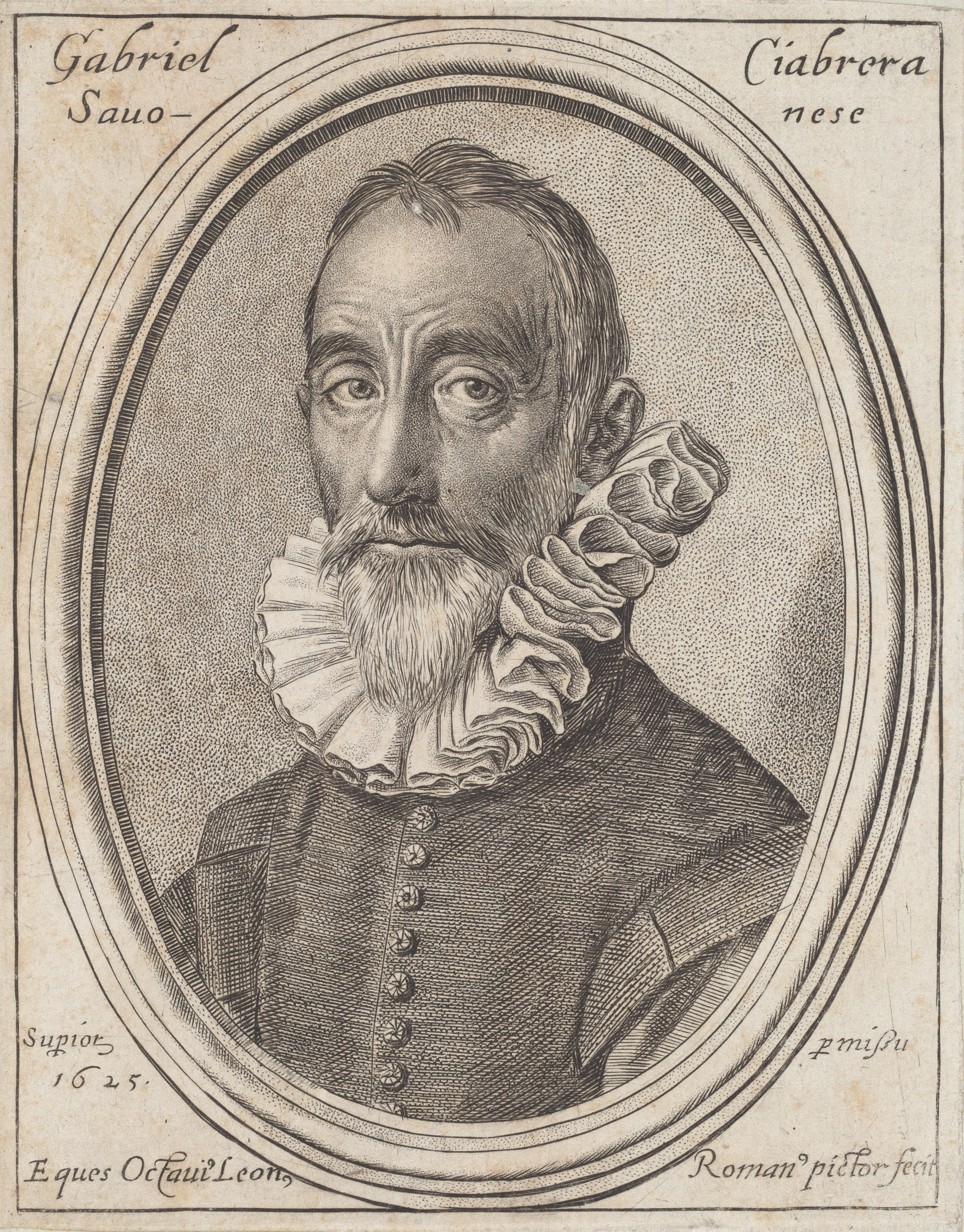
- Ottavio Leoni, Gabriello Chiabrera, 1625, engraving and stipple in laid paper, Washington, National Gallery of Art
- Born: 18 June 1552; Savona, Republic of Genoa
- Died: 14 October 1638 (aged 86); Savona, Republic of Genoa
- Resting place: Church of San Giacomo, Savona
- Education: Roman College
- Occupations: Poet; Intellectual
- Spouse: Lelia Pavese (m. 1602)
- Writing career
- Language: Italian
- Period: 17th century; Seicento
- Genres: Poetry; autobiography
- Notable works: Canzonette; Il rapimento di Cefalo; Orfeo dolente
- Literary movement: Late Renaissance; Baroque

Gabriello Chiabrera (Italian pronunciation: [ɡabriˈɛllo kjaˈbrɛːra]; 18 June 1552 – 14 October 1638) was an Italian poet, sometimes called the Italian Pindar. His "new metres and a Hellenic style enlarged the range of lyric forms available to later Italian poets." Chiabrera is routinely compared by Italian critics to his younger contemporary Giambattista Marino.

== Biography ==
=== Early life and education ===
Chiabrera was born in Savona, a small coastal town near Genoa, into a family of patrician descent. As he states in a pleasant fragment of autobiography prefixed to his works, where, like Julius Caesar, he speaks of himself in the third person, he was a posthumous child; he went to Rome at the age of nine, under the care of his uncle Giovanni. There he read with a private tutor, suffered severely from two fevers in succession, and was sent at last, for the sake of society, to the Roman College, where he remained till his 20th year, studying philosophy, as he says, "rather for occupation than for learning's sake".

Losing his uncle about this time, Chiabrera returned to Savona, "again to see his own and be seen by them." A little while later he returned to Rome and entered the household of Cardinal Cornaro, where he remained for several years, frequenting the society of Paulus Manutius and of Sperone Speroni, the dramatist and critic of Tasso, and attending the lectures and hearing the conversation of Muretus. After being involved in a duel, he left Rome and returned to his native Savona, where he spent the next decade pursuing his literary studies.

=== Literary fame ===
Although Chiabrera wrote in almost every literary genre of his day, his most important contribution was in the field of lyric poetry. Poets of his choice were Pindar and Anacreon. These he studied until it became his ambition to reproduce in his own tongue their rhythms and structures and to enrich his country with a new form of verse. After publishing several collections of lyric verse (two books of Canzonette in 1591, Scherzi e canzonette morali and Maniere de’ versi toscani in 1599), he was hailed as the creator of a new lyric style, and his fame spread throughout Italy. He passed his later years in Florence (1595–1633) and Savona, enjoying the patronage of the Grand Dukes of Tuscany, Duke Charles Emmanuel I of Savoy, Duke Vincenzo Gonzaga, and Pope Urban VIII.

=== Later life ===
At the age of 50, Chiabrera married Lelia Pavese, by whom he had no children. After a simple, blameless life, in which he produced a vast quantity of verse — epic, tragic, pastoral, lyrical and satirical — he died in Savona on 14 October 1638. An elegant Latin epitaph was written for him by Pope Urban VIII, but his tombstone bears two quaint Italian hexameters of his own, warning the gazer from the poet's example not to prefer Parnassus to Calvary.

== Works ==
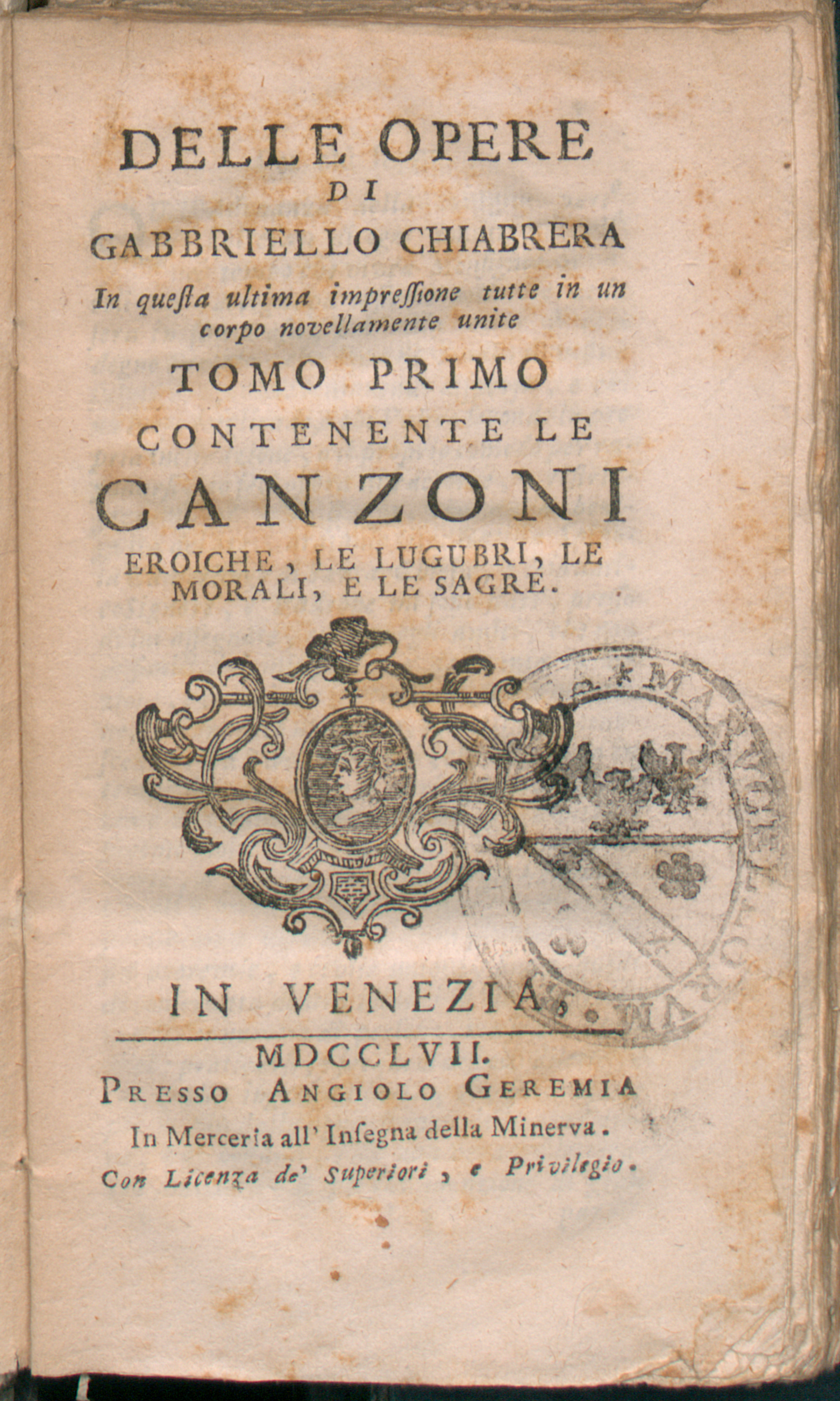
Delle opere di Gabriello Chiabrera (1757)

A maker of odes in their elaborate pomp of strophe and antistrophe, a master of new, complex rhythms, a coiner of ambitious words and composite epithets, an employer of audacious transpositions and inversions, and the inventor of a new system of poetic diction, Chiabrera was compared with Ronsard. Both were destined to suffer eclipse as great and sudden as their glory. Chiabrera was little affected by the flamboyant Marinism of his time. Proposing to reform Italian verse by imitating the Greeks, he cultivated many genres and introduced a variety of metrical forms. The metric forms of his poetry betray a solid knowledge and transparent imitation of Greek and Roman poets, such as Pindar, Anacreon, Horace and Catullus.

Influenced by the humanist theories of Speroni and the Pléiade and by the strophic forms of the more popular vein of the Italian Renaissance, he experimented with the metrical patterns and simple strophic verse adapted by Ronsard from classical models, as well as with the varied stanza types of earlier Italian poets, such as Sannazaro, Serafino dell'Aquila, Lorenzo de' Medici, and Poliziano. In contrast to his celebrated contemporary Giambattista Marino, his poetry employed classical forms and exercised greater restraint in the use of images as a reaction to the century’s prevailing Petrarchism. Conscious of his reputation as a modern Pindar, he compared himself to Christopher Columbus (also a native of Savona), saying that he strove ‘to discover a new world’ of poetry.

Chiabrera, however, was a man of merit, not just an innovator. Setting aside his epics and dramas (one of the latter, Il rapimento di Cefalo was put to music by Giulio Caccini and translated into French by the court poet Nicolas Chrétien), much of his work remains readable and pleasant. His grand Pindarics are dull, but some of his Canzonette, like the anacreontics of Ronsard, are elegant and graceful. His autobiographical sketch is also interesting. It reveals the simple poet, with his adoration of Greek (when a thing pleased him greatly he was wont to talk of it as "Greek Verse"), delight in journeys and sightseeing, dislike of literary talk save with intimates and equals, vanities and vengeances, pride in remembered favours bestowed on him by popes and princes, infinita maraviglia over Virgil's versification and metaphor, fondness for masculine rhymes and blank verse, and quiet Christianity.

== Reception ==
Chiabrera was highly regarded by such poets as William Wordsworth and Giacomo Leopardi. Until the twentieth century, he was generally seen as a classicist, a voice of restraint amidst the extravagances of Seicento poetry. Arcadian critics, rejecting the extravagances of Marinism, praised the measured sobriety of Chiabrera's style, seeing it as the only sound basis of a new "school (of poetry) ... not unworthy to compete with that of Petrarch," as Giovanni Mario Crescimbeni wrote in 1698. And although Croce echoed the more negative assessments of such nineteenth-century critics as Luigi Settembrini and Francesco de Sanctis, characterising Chiabrera's poetry as "incredibly arid and laboured," he still contrasted him with the "sensuous and mellow" Marino, whom he equally disliked. Indeed, in his attempt to give some conceptual rigour to the term "Baroque", Croce went so far as to separate Marino and Chiabrera in chapters entitled "Baroque poetry" and "Literary poetry", respectively.

Since Croce's time, few scholars have attempted to restore some of the lustre to Chiabrera's tarnished critical reputation and to focus attention once again on the innovative, indeed radical nature of his poetry. Chief among these has been Giovanni Getto, who, in a study provocatively entitled Gabriello Chiabrera: Baroque Poet has insisted that the innovative, experimental aspect of the poet's output should be seen as part of a larger movement in Italian poetry of the time. Manifesting itself in phenomena as diverse as the madrigals of Marino or the canzoni of Fulvio Testi, this movement, in defying many of the conventions of previous Italian poetry contrasted sharply with the more stable aesthetic of sixteenth-century verse. While Chiabrera's innovations were more muted, his novelties more subtle, he nevertheless was in his own way as much a radical as any of his contemporaries.

== Bibliography ==
- This article incorporates text from a publication now in the public domain: Herbermann, Charles, ed. (1913). "Gabriello Chiabrera". Catholic Encyclopedia. New York: Robert Appleton Company.
- Croce, Bendetto (1929). Storia dell'età barocca in Italia: Pensiero - Poesia e letteratura - Vita morale. Bari: Laterza.
- Belloni, Antonio (1931). "CHIABRERA, Gabriello". Enciclopedia Italiana. Rome: Istituto dell'Enciclopedia Italiana.
- Highet, Gilbert (1949). The Classical Tradition: Greek and Roman Influences on Western Literature. Oxford University Press, USA. pp. 235-236, 245–246. ISBN 9780198020066.
- Getto, Giovanni (1954). "Un capitolo della letteratura barocca: Gabriello Chiabrera". Lettere Italiane. 6 (1): 55–89. JSTOR 26244200.
- Castagna, Luigi (1991). "Pindaro, le origini del Pindarismo e Gabriello Chiabrera". Aevum. 65 (3): 523–42. JSTOR 20858682.
- Rossi, P. (2002). "Chiabrera, Gabriello". The Oxford Companion to Italian Literature. Oxford University Press. ISBN 978-0-19-818332-7.
- Giordano, Paolo A. (2006). Gaetana Marrone; Paolo Puppa (eds.). "Gabriello Chiabrera". Encyclopedia of Italian Literary Studies. Routledge: 455–458. ISBN 9781135455309.
- Donnini, Andrea (2007). "Le carte di Gabriello Chiabrera con un'appendice di lettere inedite". Ellisse: Studi storici di letteratura italiana. 2 (2): 259–313. doi:10.1400/173128.
- Vazzoler, Franco (2008). "L'elogio della donna nella poesia di Chiabrera". In assenza del re: le reggenti dal XIV al XVII secolo: Piemonte ed Europa. Florence: Leo S. Olschki. pp. 281–294. doi:10.1400/189321.
- Carminati, Clizia (2008). "Una lirica di Chiabrera per Urbano VIII". Filologia italiana: Rivista annuale. 5 (5): 1–12. doi:10.1400/111864.
- Corrieri, Alessandro (2014). "Da Sofocle a Tasso: Il Percorso Del Chiabrera Tragico". Lettere Italiane. 66 (2): 188–212. JSTOR 26240840.
- Martín Sáez, Daniel (2020). "Los melodramas de Gabriello Chiabrera: Favole, Favolette, Intermedii y Vegghie". Revista de Musicología. 43 (1): 77–108. doi:10.2307/26915452. JSTOR 26915452.
- Tarallo, Claudia (2023). "«S'al duol l'ingegno non vien meno o l'arte» : una silloge inedita di Gabriello Chiabrera". Studi Secenteschi. LXIV (64): 211–230. doi:10.1400/294586.
