= Vincent Dumestre =

French lutenist

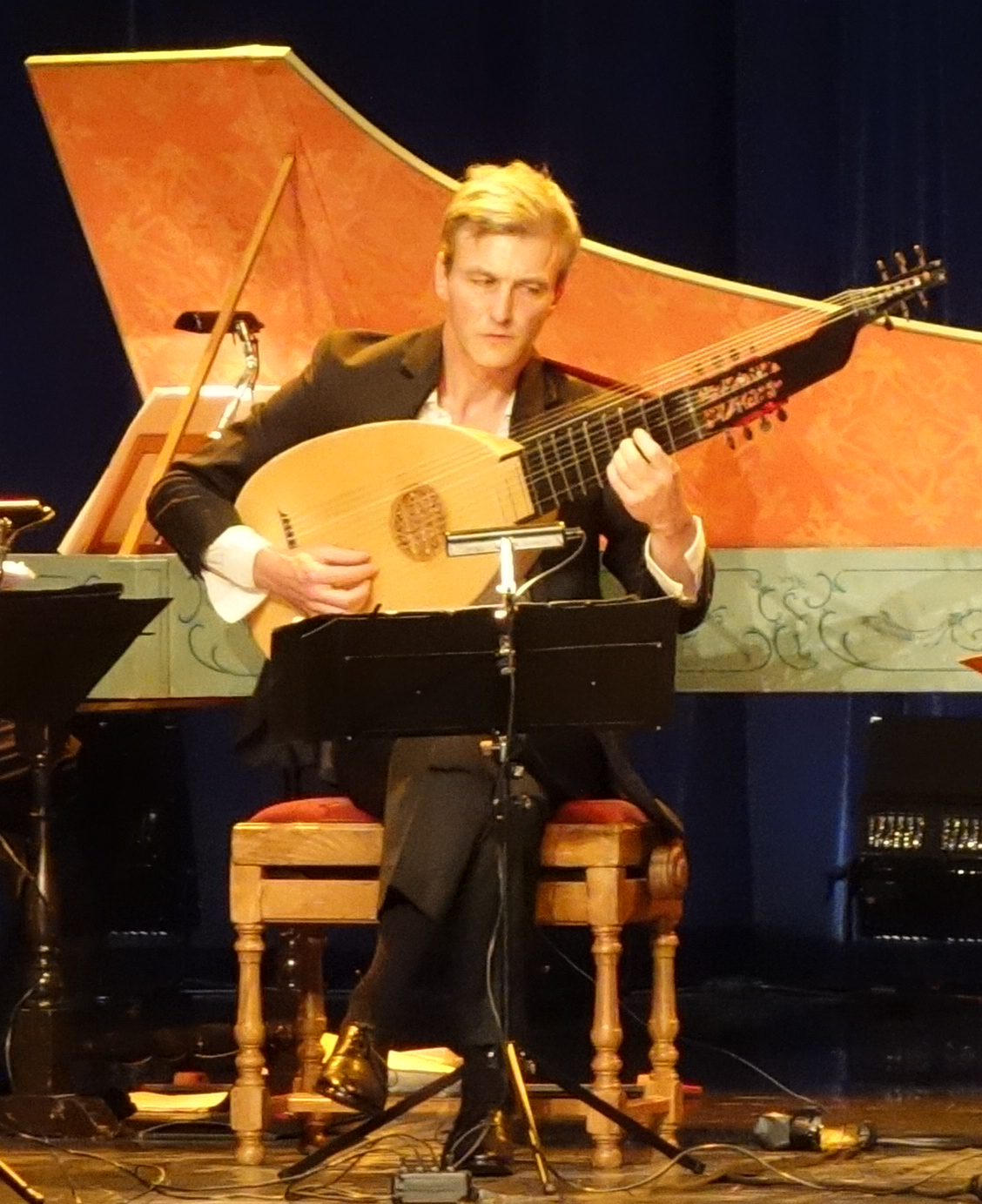
Vincent Dumestre

Vincent Dumestre (born 5 May 1968) is a French lutenist. In 1997 he founded the ensemble Le Poème Harmonique.

== Career ==
He studied the classical guitar at the École Normale de Musique de Paris and art history at the École du Louvre. Afterwards he dedicated himself to the music for theorbo, baroque guitar and lute, studying with Hopkinson Smith and Eugène Ferré.

Since then, he has performed with numerous ensembles, including the Ricercar Consort, La Simphonie du Marais, Le Concert des nations, La Grande Écurie et la Chambre du Roy, Akadêmia and the Centre de musique baroque de Versailles.

In 1998, he founded Le Poème harmonique. The ensemble won critical acclaim from the outset, and Vincent Dumestre was voted "Young Talent of the Year 1999" by Diapason magazine. His recordings for the Alpha label have won numerous awards (Diapason d'or de l'année, Choc du Monde de la musique de l'année, recommended by Classica...).

In 2004, the French Minister of Culture appointed Vincent Dumestre Chevalier des Arts et des Lettres.

In 2005, he received the Grand Prix du Disque of the L'Académie Charles Cros in the category "baroque music" for Bourgeois Gentilhomme.
