= Shira Kammen =

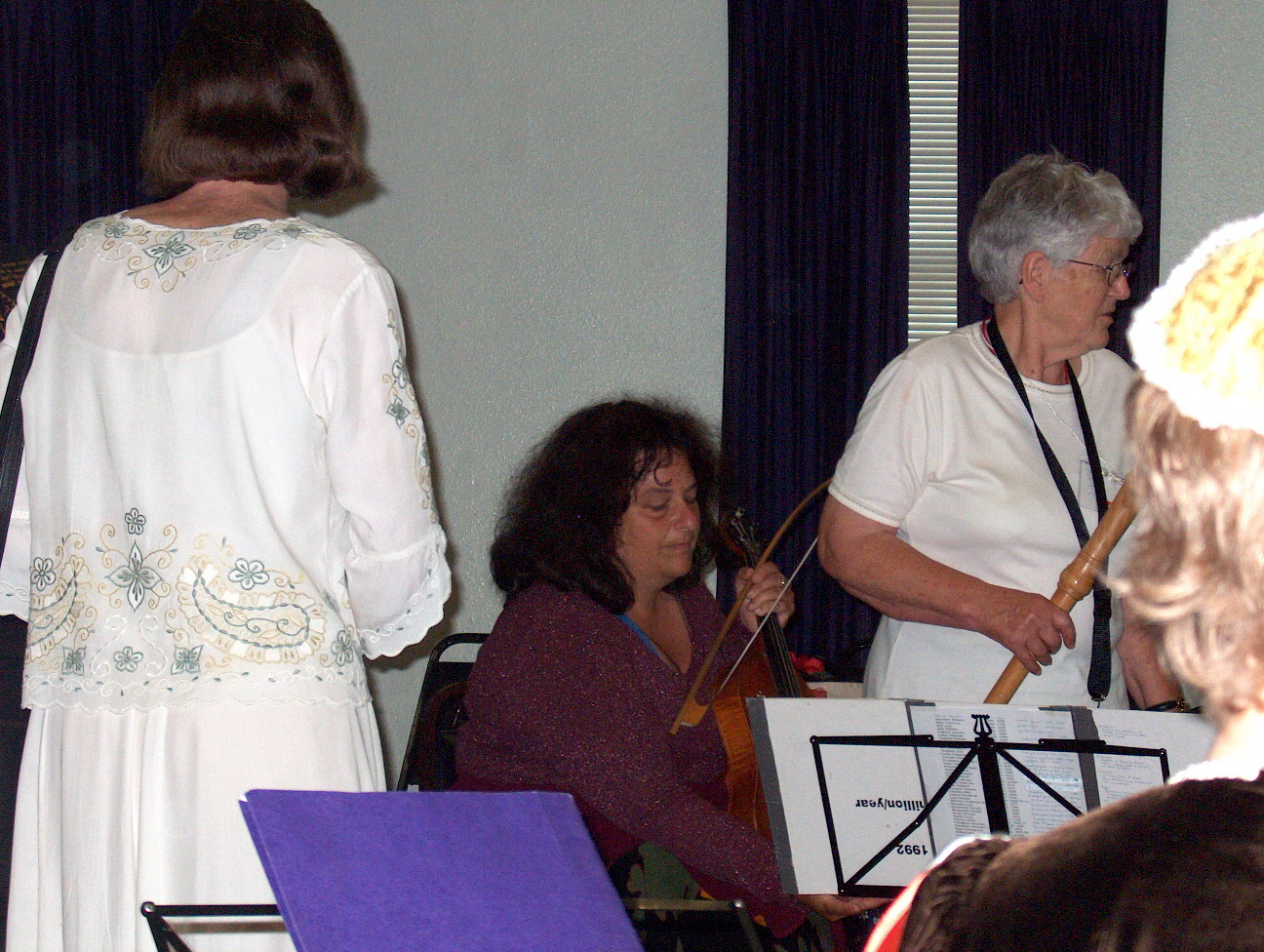
- At the 2007 Port Townsend Early Music Workshop

Background information
- Genres: Early Music, Folk Music
- Instrument(s): Vielle, Fiddle, Viola da Gamba, Harp and Voice
- Labels: Bright Angel Records
- Website: www.shirakammen.com

Shira Kammen is a multi-instrumentalist and vocalist.

She received her degree in music from the University of California, Berkeley and studied vielle with Margriet Tindemans. She has performed and taught throughout the world and has played on several television and movie soundtracks, including "O", a modern high school-setting of Othello. Her music was also licensed for the soundtrack of the video game Braid.

She currently lives in El Cerrito, California.

== Ensembles ==
Shira collaborated with singer/storyteller John Fleagle for fifteen years, and has been or is a member of or worked with a number of different groups:

- Founder of Class V Music, an ensemble dedicated to performance on river rafting trips.
- The Boston Camerata
- Camerata Mediterranea
- Cançonièr, a medieval ensemble
- Ensemble Alcatraz
- Ephemeros new music group
- Fortune's Wheel, a medieval ensemble
- Hespèrion XX
- The King's Noyse
- Medieval Strings
- Panacea, an eclectic ethnic band
- Project Ars Nova
- Sequentia
- Trouz Bras, a band devoted to the dance music of Celtic Brittany
- Joanna Newsom, an American singer-songwriter and multi-instrumentalist; Kammen plays the vielle and the rebec in the song "Kingfisher" on the 2010 album Have One On Me.

== Discography ==
- (1988) Visions and Miracles with Ensemble Alcatraz. Elektra Nonesuch.
- (1989) Ars Magis Subtiliter with Ensemble P.A.N. (Project Ars Nova). New Albion Records, Inc.
- (1990) Danse Royale with Ensemble Alcatraz. Elektra Nonesuch.
- (1991) The Island of St. Hylarion with Ensemble P.A.N. (Project Ars Nova) New Albion Records, Inc.
- (1991) Lo Gai Saber with Camerata Mediterranea. Erato.
- (1992) Homage to Johannes Ciconia with Ensemble P.A.N. (Project Ars Nova). New Albion Records, Inc.
- (1994) Remede de Fortune by Guillaume de Machaut with Ensemble P.A.N. (Project Ars Nova). New Albion Records, Inc.
- (1994) The Unicorn with Anne Azéma. Erato.
- (1994) Wings of Time with Lauren Pomerantz. Songbird Music.
- (1995) Le Roman de Fauvel with Boston Camerata and Ensemble P.A.N. (Project Ars Nova). Erato.
- (1995) Unseen Rain with Ensemble P.A.N. (Project Ars Nova). New Albion Records, Inc.
- (1996) Angeli with Ensemble P.A.N. (Project Ars Nova). Telarc.
- (1996) Le Jeu d'Amour with Anne Azéma. Erato.
- (1996) World's Bliss with John Fleagle. Archetype Records.
- (1997) The Cloister and the Sparrow Hawk: Songs of the Monk of Montaudon (Twelfth Century) with Tim Rayborn and Alison Sabedoria. ASV.
- (1997) Tapestry: Song of Songs: Come into my garden. Telarc.
- (1998) Cantigas with Camerata Mediterranea. Erato.
- (1998) Celtic Roads. Revels Records.
- (1998) Provence Mystique with Anne Azéma. Erato.
- (2000) Cantigas de Amigo with Ensemble Alcatraz. Dorian.
- (2002) Music of Waters. Bright Angel Records.
- (2002) Pastourlle with Fortune's Wheel. Dorian Recordings.
- (2003) The Almanac: Time & the Turning Wheel. Bright Angel Records.
- (2003) The Castle of the Holly King: Secular music for the Yuletide. Bright Angel Records.
- (2004) Across The River: Settings of poems from Lord of the Rings by J. R. R. Tolkien. Bright Angel Records.
- (2006) Mistral. Bright Angel Records.
- (2008) Ragged, Rent and Torn. Bright Angel Records.
- (2010) Panacea: Songs and Dance Music of Northern and Eastern Europe with Panacea. Flaming-Buddha Music.
- (2012) The Dawn of Joy. Magnatune.
