= Franz Jakob Späth =

German organ and piano maker (1714–1786)

- Born: c. 1714; Regensburg, Bavaria
- Died: 23 July 1786 (aged 71–72); Regensburg, Bavaria
- Occupations: Organ builder; Piano maker
- Known for: Tangent pianos

Franz Jakob Späth (or Spath; (Note: His name is now normally written with an umlaut, but authorities in the past, such as Fétis, Forkel, and Gerber, spelled his name without the umlaut. Mozart was the first to spell his name with an umlaut.) c. 1714 – 23 July 1786) was a German keyboard instrument builder. He was born and died in Regensburg, where he worked for most of his life. An organ builder by training, he is known, along with his son-in-law Christoph Friedrich Schmahl, as the most prominent builder of tangent pianos.

== Life ==
Franz Jakob Späth was the son of the organ builder Johann Jakob Späth. He was likely trained in organ building by his father. He took charge of his father's workshop in 1747. In the same year, he married Johanna Rosina Schessinger. The couple had seven children, three of whom survived childhood.

In 1751, he presented a tangent piano to the Elector of Bonn. Instead of striking the strings with a pivoted hammer, they are struck with non-pivoting, vertical hammers called tangents. Ernst Ludwig Gerber reported that the instrument had 30 tone variations, which increased to 50 in 1770.

The piano builder Johann Andreas Stein apprenticed with Späth from 1749 to 1750. Stein's claviorgan of 1781 shows Späth's influence. In 1774, Späth established a piano building firm with his son-in-law Christoph Friedrich Schmahl (1739–1814), who came from a family of organ builders.

Späth died on 23 July 1786. The firm was inherited by Schmahl's son, Christian Carl, but was dissolved after his death.

== Instruments ==
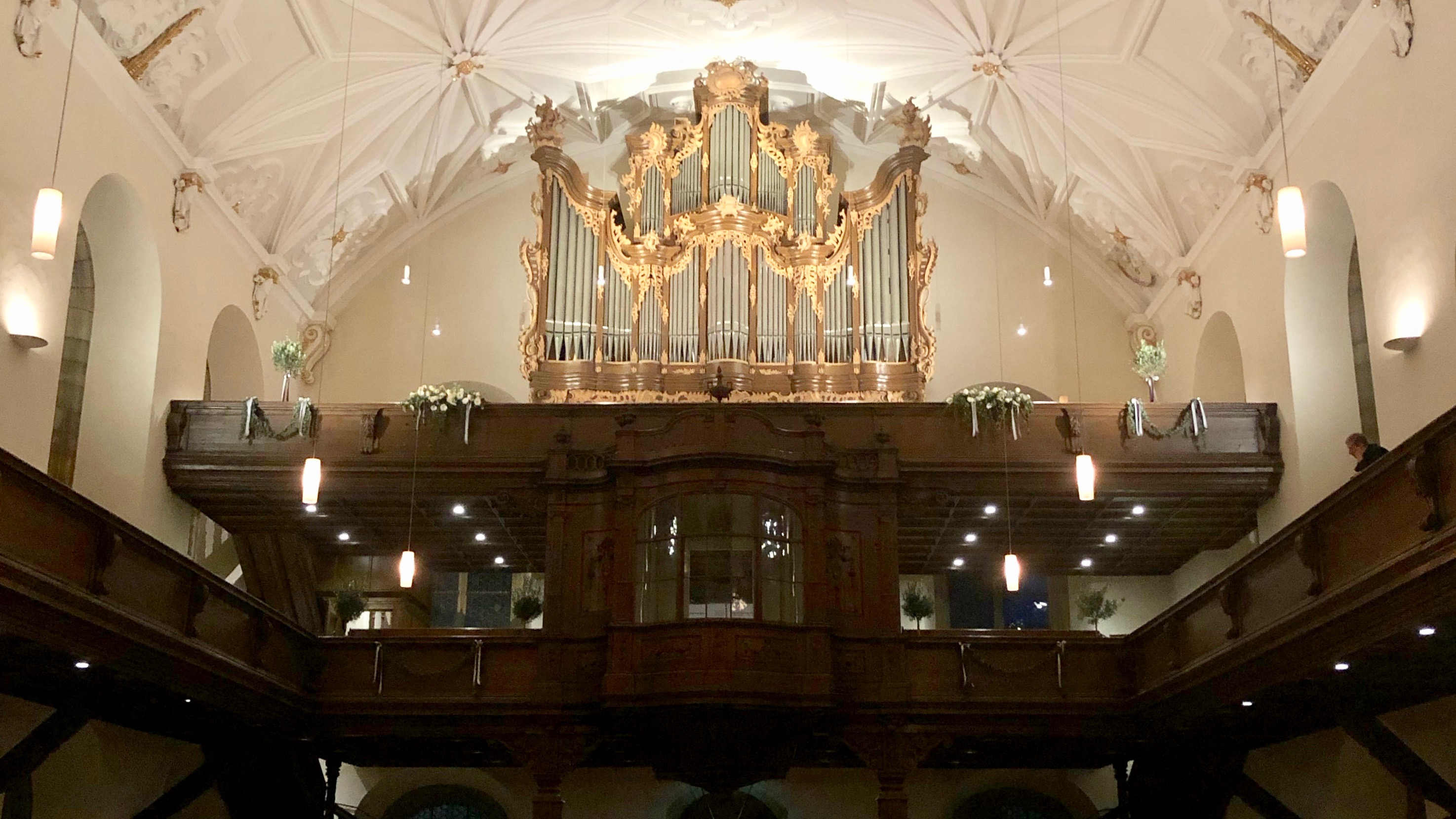
Organ at the Dreieinigheitskirche

Though widely credited as the inventor of the tangent piano, Späth was not the first to invent the tangent action. Jean Marius had proposed a similar mechanism in 1716 to the French Academy of Sciences. Christoph Gottlieb Schröter claimed to have invented an instrument with a similar action in 1717, though it was not announced until 1747 in Lorenz Christoph Mizler's Neu eröffnete musikalische Bibliothek. One surviving tangent piano from the 18th century was likely built in Späth's lifetime. Schmahl continued to manufacture and sign instruments under his and his father-in-law's name until 1793.

Späth himself never used the term tangent piano (Tangentenflügel), which first appeared in 1791. He referred to the mechanism as Tangirung and the instrument as Pandaleons Forte-pianos, Pianoforteinstrumente in Flügelform, clavecin d'amour, owing to its expressiveness and dynamic range, or simply Clavier.

Späth also built harpsichords and harpsichord-pianos. On 10 September 1765, an advertisement for Späth's instruments with the combined fortepiano and harpsichord actions appeared on the Leipziger Zeitung. In 1770, he advertised an instrument with three manuals that combined the Tangirung action with a harpsichord's plucking action.

Späth built the organ in Regensburg's Dreieinigkeitskirche, which was completed in 1758. It was renovated in 1892 by Johannes Strebel. The renovation replaced the principal pipes and added three reed pipe ranks, while preserving the instrument's facade. It was renovated again in 1966 by Detlef Kleuker. The new organ was prone to faults and had to be repaired often. It was removed in 2009 and was rebuilt by Jürgen Ahrend to better suit Johann Sebastian Bach's music by basing it on Thuringian and Central German organs, which Bach composed for, while preserving Späth's facade. The rebuilding was completed in the summer of 2020. Späth also built the organ in Oswaldkirche in 1753 and planned to build a new organ for the Regensburg Cathedral. After it was vetoed by the bishop, Späth was only instructed to repair the cathedral's old organ.

Späth's instruments were generally well-regarded. Forkel praised his fortepianos in his 1782 Musikalischer Almanach für Deutschland. In 1777, Mozart wrote to his father that Späth's fortepianos were his favorite, before he was introduced to Stein's. Carl Ludwig Junker reported that Beethoven refused to play on an instrument made by Späth. Junker postulated that Beethoven, who played Stein's pianos in Bonn, was not accustomed to playing Späth's pianos.
