= Clavicymbalum =

Early keyboard instrument

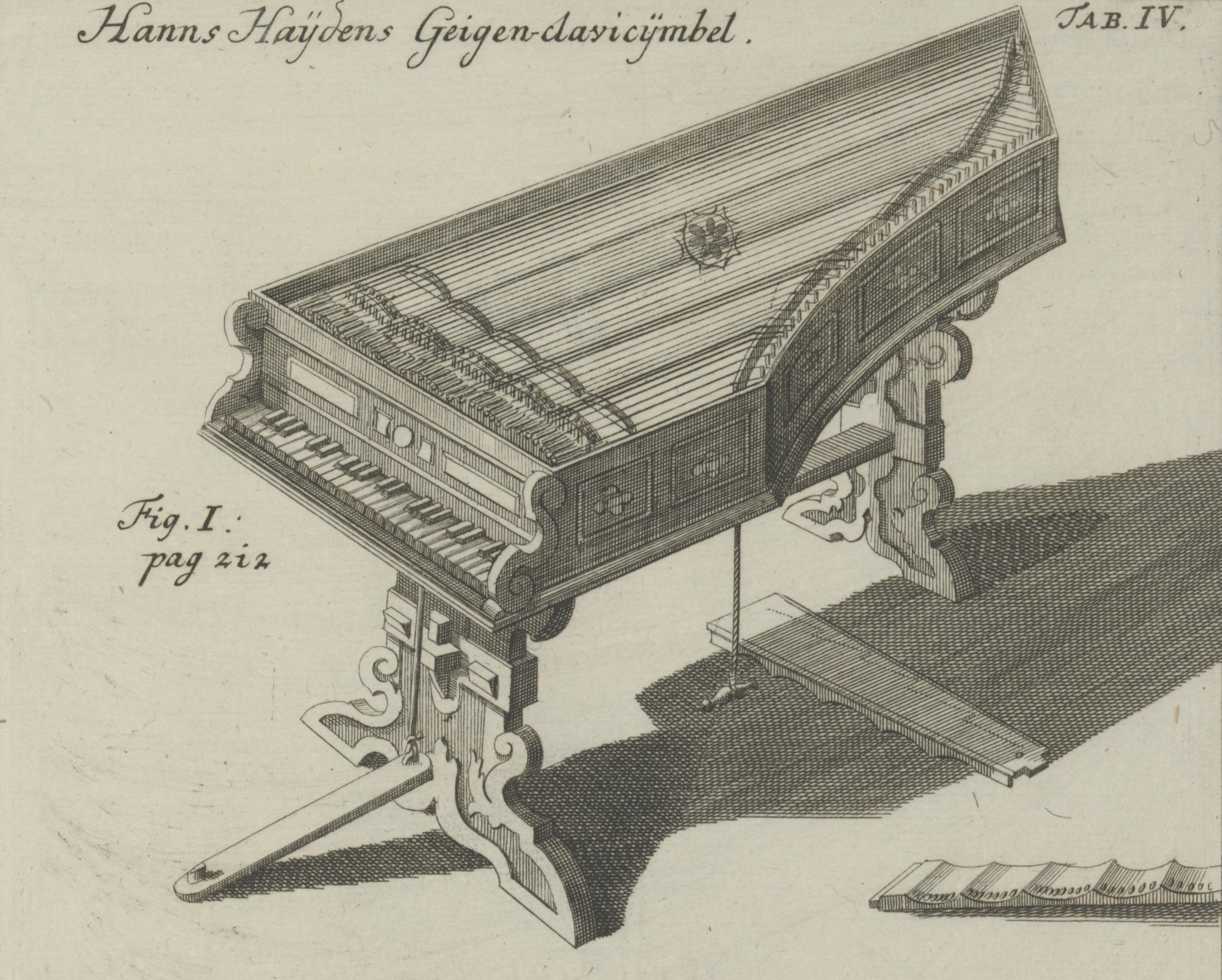
Clavicymbalum

The clavicymbalum (or clavisymbalum, clavisimbalum, etc.) is an early keyboard instrument and ancestor of the harpsichord. The instrument is described as a psaltery to which keys, but no dampers, have been attached, allowing the keys rather than the fingers to pluck the strings, which then ring until their sound fades out.

One of its earliest attestations is a 1323 work by Johannes de Muris, where it describes a monochordium as an instrument "with a keyboard of two octaves, of triangular form, with one of the three sides curved."

The work of Henri-Arnault de Zwolle (between 1438 and 1446) describes the clavicymbalum as one of the "three types" of keyboard instruments, along with the dulce melos (an early piano) and the clavicordium (clavichord).
