= Anne Azéma =

American opera singer

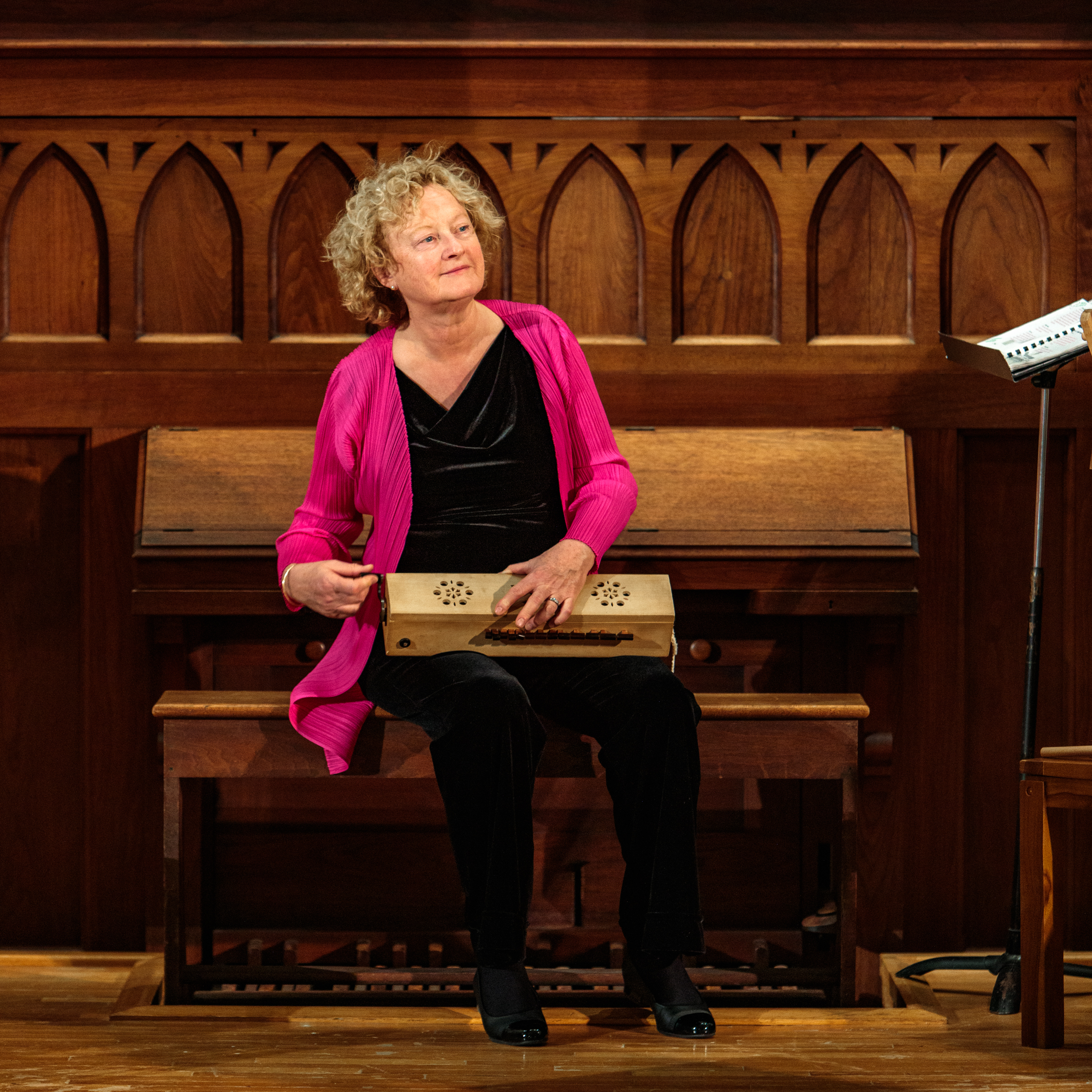
Anne Azéma in 2021

Anne Azéma (born October 19, 1957) is a French-born soprano, scholar, and stage director. She is artistic director of the Boston Camerata. She has been a singer of early music since 1993, has created and directed programs for the Boston Camerata and is a music scholar. She performs music from the Middle Ages, lute songs from the Renaissance period, Baroque sacred music, Shaker songs, and contemporary music theater. She is also a music educator and a researcher. She has performed in Japan, Germany, United States and Australia.

== Career ==
Anne Azéma was born in Niort, France, on October 19, 1957. She spent her childhood in Strasbourg and came to the United States to study at the New England Conservatory in 1979. She first sang with Boston Camerata in the 1981–1982 season.

Her special field is secular/vernacular song of France and Provence in the Middle Ages. She shared a "Grand Prix du Disque" for her role as Iseult in the Boston Camerata's recording of Tristan and Iseult. Four solo recital albums, The Unicorn, The Game of Love, Provence Mystique and Etoile du Nord also document her original work in this area.

Azéma is a founding member of the Camerata Mediterranea, touring with them internationally and appearing on all of their CDs (Edison Prize). She has also been involved in many of the Boston Camerata's American music projects, taking the role of Mother Ann Lee of the Shakers in the dance-and-music theater work "Borrowed Light" (premiered in 2004) by Finnish choreographer Tero Saarinen and Azéma's husband, Camerata director emeritus Joel Cohen. Azéma's discography numbers over thirty five recordings as a soloist, recitalist, and/or director on the Warner — Erato, Harmonia Mundi, Virgin, Nonesuch, Bridge, Calliope, Atma and K 617 labels.

Anne Azéma is the founder and director of the European-based Ensemble Aziman.

In 2007 Ms. Azéma directed the music for a staged work Le Tournoi de Chauvency, performed in major theaters of eastern France and Luxembourg.

In 2011, Azéma was decorated as a Chevalier des Arts et des Lettres of the French Republic and promoted Officier des Arts et des Lettres in 2021.

== Discography ==
=== Soloist ===
CDs Recordings: Recital and Music Direction

- Le Tournoi de Chauvency : Une joute d’Amour en Lorraine, K617 – 2007
- Etoile du nord : Gauthier de Coincy et le miracle médiéval, Calliope – 2003 (CD of the Year, Toronto Star, 10 de Répertoire)
- Die Stadt der Narre: weltliche und geistliche Macht im Frankreich und der Provence des Mittlealters, WDR – 2001
- El Maestro, WDR – 2000
- Provence mystique : Sacred Songs of the Middle Ages, Erato – 1998 (10 de Répertoire, **** Le Monde de la musique, YYYYY Diapason, nominated for the Grand Prix des Discophiles, ffff Télérama, 5 Classica)
- Le Jeu d’amour : the game of love in Medieval France, Erato – 1996, (10 de Répertoire, **** Le Monde de la Musique)
- The Unicorn : Medieval French love songs, Erato – 1994 (10 de Répertoire, Choc du Monde de la Musique, 'Critics Choice’ Gramophone, YYYYY Diapason)

=== As vocal soloist and Director ===
- Hodie Christus Natus Est, The Boston Camerata, Harmonia Mundi – 2021
- Dido and Aeneas: An Opera for Distanced Lovers, The Boston Camerata – 2020
- Free America! The Boston Camerata, Harmonia Mundi – 2018
- Treasures of Devotion, The Boston Camerata, Music and Arts – 2018
- A Mediterranean Christmas, The Boston Camerata, Warner – 2006
- L'harmonie du Monde, Doulce Mémoire, Virgin/Naïve – 2003
- Li tans Nouviaus, Constantinople Ensemble, ATMA – 2003 (nominated Opus, Montréal)
- The Almanac : Shira Kammen and Friends, Bright Angel Records – 2003
- Golden Harvest: More Shaker songs, The Boston Camerata, Glissando – 2000
- Cantigas, Camerata Mediterranea, Erato (Edison Prize, 10 de Répertoire) – 1999
- Liberty Tree, The Boston Camerata, Erato – 1998
- What then is Love: Elizabethan Songbook, The Boston Camerata, Erato – 1998
- Douce Beauté, Pierre Guédron, The Boston Camerata, Erato – 1998
- Angels, The Boston Camerata & Tod Machover, Erato – 1997
- Johnny Johnson, Kurt Weill; The Boston Camerata, Erato (Disque de l'année, Le Monde; Diapason D'Or; Choc du Monde de la Musique) – 1997
- Brain Opera: Tod Machover – 1996
- Trav'ling Home: American Spirituals, The Boston Camerata, Erato – 1996
- Carmina Burana, The Boston Camerata, Erato ( 10 de Répertoire) – 1996
- Farewell Unkind, Songs and Dances of John Dowland, The Boston Camerata. Erato (Choc du Monde de la Musique) – 1996
- Quel Diletto, Organisatie Oude Muziek, Utrecht – 1995
- Le Roman de Fauvel, The Boston Camerata, Erato, 10 de Répertoire) – 1995
- Simple Gifts: Shaker Chants and Spirituals, The Boston Camerata, Erato – 1995
- Bernatz Ventadorn: Le Fou sur le Pont, Camerata Mediterranea, Erato (nominated, Grand Prix des Discophiles, Critic's Choice, Grammophone, ) – 1994
- An American Christmas, The Boston Camerata, Erato – 1993
- Nueva España, The Boston Camerata, Erato – 1992
- Jean Gilles, Lamentations; The Boston Camerata, Erato – 1992
- The American Vocalist, The Boston Camerata, Erato – 1991
- Lo Gai Saber, Camerata Mediterranea, Erato – 1991
- A Baroque Christmas, The Boston Camerata, Nonesuch – 1991
- Valis, Tod Machover, Bridge – (CD of the Year, The New York Times) – 1990
- Le Pont Sacré, Erato (Référence de Compact) – 1990
- A Renaissance Christmas, The Boston Camerata, Nonesuch – 1989
- Jean Gilles, Requiem; The Boston Camerata, Erato – 1989
- Tristan & Iseult, The Boston Camerata, Erato (Choc du Monde de la Musique, 10 de Répertoire, Grand Prix du Disque) – 1987
- Noël, Noël: A French Christmas, Erato – 1988
- New Britain, The Boston Camerata, Erato – 1986
- La Primavera, The Boston Camerata, Erato – 1983
- Josquin des Prés; Missa Pange Lingua et motets, Harmonia Mundi – 1982

== Sources ==
- Freedman, Geraldine (December 15, 2011). "Boston Camerata tells stories through medieval music". Union College Daily Gazette.
- Perkins, David (March 15, 2011). "Selling Resonance". Boston Globe.
- Madonna, Zoë (November 15, 2019). "Boston Camerata uncovers sounds 'that early music tends to forget' with Hispanic Christmas concert". Boston Globe.
- Anne Azema longy.edu
- Anne Azema Honored December 2021 bostoncamerata.org
- Hodie Christus Natus Est Es muss nicht immer Bach sein bostoncamerata.org (in German)
- Hodie Christus Natus Est "La Boston Camerata vous souhaite Nova gaudia pour Noël !". ResMusica (in French). 22 December 2021.
- France Musique, Anne Azéma: Urbain, Jean-Baptiste; Matignon, Pierre; Guillemet, Marion; Sternadel, Flora; Bouzar, Yassine (12 September 2021). "La Matinale avec Anne Azéma". France Musique (in French).
