= Tangent piano =

Type of keyboard instrument

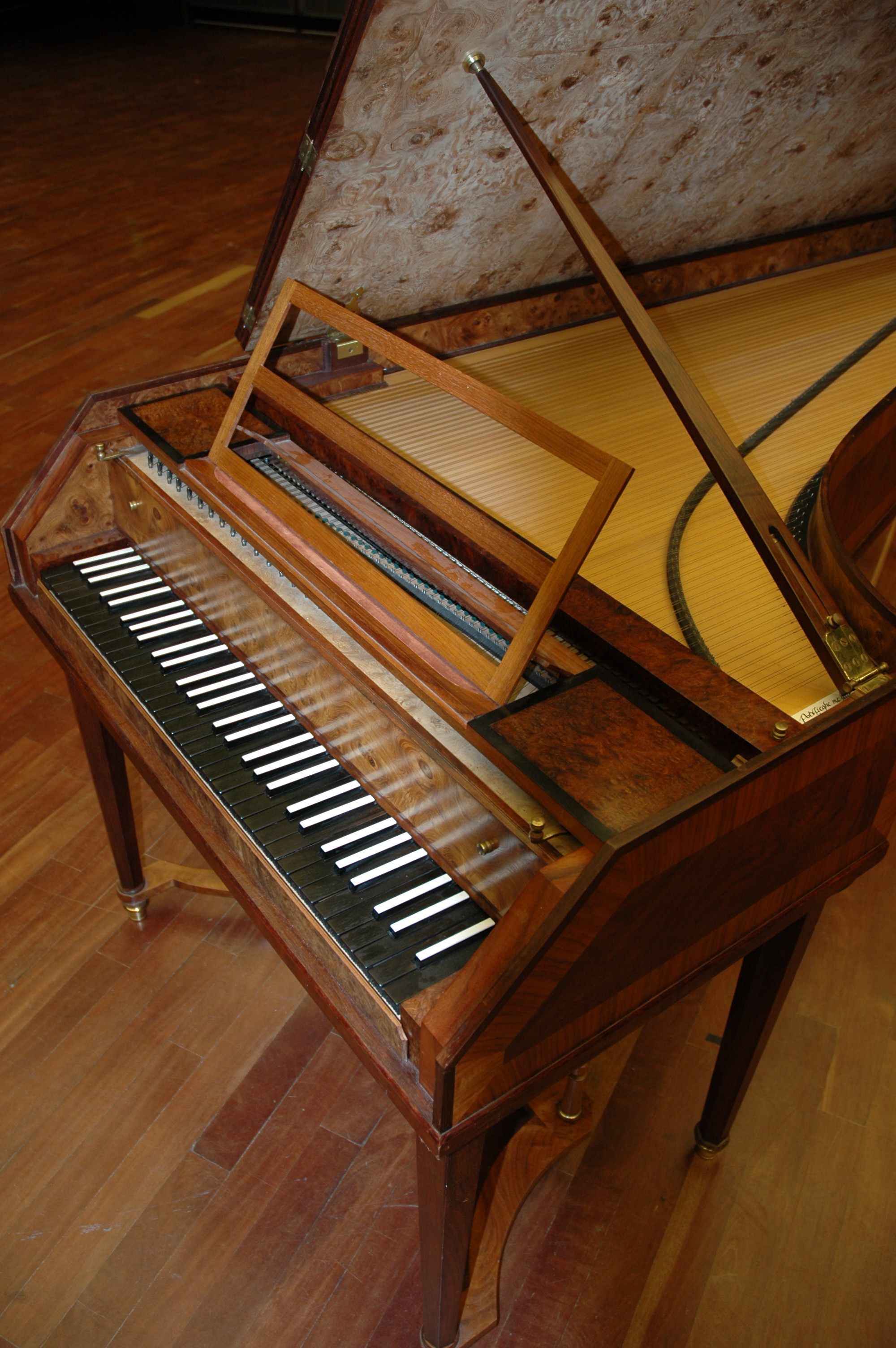
Reconstruction of a tangent piano according to historical examples by Dierik Potvlieghe

The tangent piano is a very rare keyboard instrument that resembles a harpsichord and early pianos in design. It normally features five octaves of keys and the strings are acted upon by narrow wooden or metal slips when the keys are depressed.

== History ==
In 1440, Arnault de Zwolle described what is believed to be the first keyboard instrument which used a tangent action. The earliest surviving instrument with a tangent action is a spinet built by Francesco Bonafinis with its jacks replaced with wooden tangents before 1700. Jean Marius proposed a design for a hammered instrument similar to a tangent piano in 1716, though it was only published after his death in 1735. Christoph Gottlieb Schröter claimed that he had invented the tangent piano in 1717. Franz Jakob Späth presented a tangent piano to the elector of Bonn in 1751.

In 1777, Mozart referred to the tangent piano as the "Spättisches Klavier," after the maker of tangent pianos, Spath. Other names included the Italian cembalo angelico, and the French clavecin harmonieux et celeste. This is all evidence that the tangent piano spread throughout Europe. By the earliest decade of the 19th century, Spath tangent pianos were sent all over the globe and given a wide 6 octave range, which enabled them to compete with the piano. At the same time, the fortepiano began to eclipse the harpsichord and clavichord as the keyboard instrument of choice.

The creation of the tangent piano, and the fortepiano, were the results of attempts to remedy the lack of dynamics in harpsichord sound. Both the tangent piano and fortepiano offered a variety of sound that was appealing to the changes in classical music, which featured more expressiveness and intensity than the harpsichord could offer. The tangent piano had a short life in popularity, and dropped off somewhere in the late 18th century or early 19th century. The fortepiano, however, surpassed the harpsichord in popularity by 1800. It then slowly evolved to the massive modern iron-framed giant of 88 keys. The tangent piano's popularity lasted for such a short time that very little music was written for it. It is possible that Carl Philipp Emanuel Bach's keyboard concerti were written for this instrument or for the fortepiano. In either case, the tangent piano is an appropriate choice for the keyboard instrument in the concerti. In addition, other sons of Johann Sebastian Bach wrote pieces expressly for the tangent piano.

There are currently approximately twenty intact tangent pianos in existence. In 2006 a tangent piano was discovered on the estate of Johann Esaias von Seidel in Sulzbach-Rosenberg in its original condition. After extensive restoration it was presented to the public during a concert by Christoph Hammer and Sylvia Ackermann in 2012.

== Mechanism ==
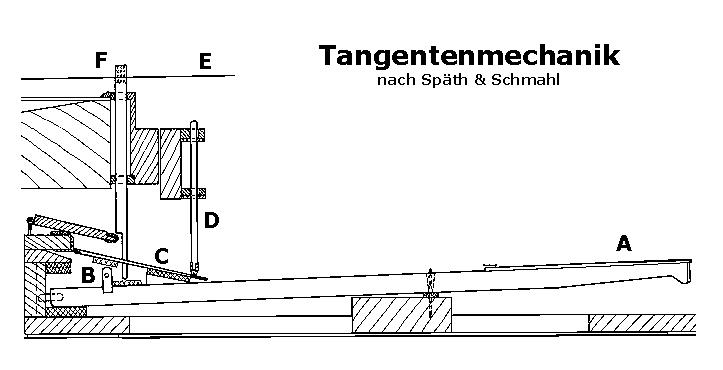
Tangent mechanism of Späth and Schmahl

In the action of a tangent piano, the tangent is a small slip of wood similar in shape to a harpsichord jack or similar to an unleathered fortepiano hammer which strikes the string to produce sound.

It is similar to the tangent of a clavichord only in the sense that they both are driven ultimately by the player's finger to strike the string to initiate sound. In the clavichord, the tangent remains in contact with the string to keep the note sounding, while in the tangent piano, the tangent immediately rebounds from the string so that the string is allowed to vibrate freely (that is, it has an escapement).

The instrument can have numerous stops to soften and sweeten the sound: una corda, moderator, harp. Also, it has a device which allows the performer to raise all the dampers (like the modern damper pedal), and another that will only raise the treble dampers (a typical feature on many early pianos). See Piano pedals.

== Tonal quality ==
The tangent piano has an unusual sound that combines the qualities of the harpsichord and piano. The treble resembles the bright sound from a light action piano, and the bass resembles the bass from a harpsichord. The sound varies from instrument to instrument, as do personal descriptions of the tangent piano's sound.

== External Sources ==
- Early Pianos Online A searchable, interactive database of over 9000 pianos built before 1860.
