= DWD (disambiguation) =

Deutscher Wetterdienst is the German weather service.

DWD may also refer to:

- Köppen climate classification#Dwd Subarctic or boreal climates with severe winters
- Dawadmi Domestic Airport (IATA code)
- Dolwyddelan railway station (National Rail station code)
- Wüstenbrand station (DS100 station code)
- Dutch Water Dreams, a former artificial whitewater and surfing centre
- De Wet Decoration, a South African military decoration
- D.W.D., an Irish whiskey produced by Jones Road Distillery
- Directorate of Water Development, the executive arm of Ministry of Water and Environment; the agency responsible for water supply and sanitation in Uganda
- Wisconsin Department of Workforce Development, an agency of Wisconsin state government
