= Laurent Belissen =

French composer (1693–1762)

Laurent Belissen (also Bellissen; 8 August 1693 – 12 February 1762) was a French Baroque composer. He was born in Aix-en-Provence and may have been among the last students of Guillaume Poitevin, then maître de musique at the choir school of the Aix Cathedral.

By 1722 Belissen settled in Marseille, where he succeeded Antoine Blanchard as maître de musique of the Abbey of St. Victor, which was then rapidly declining in importance—but he also secured a position directing the city's Académie de Concerts. Belissen remained in Marseilles until his death.

Much of Belissen's music is either lost or remains uncatalogued. His four grands motets adopt a style radically different from what contemporary Versailles composers used: Belissen uses four voices instead of five, and his style successfully combines Italian and French traits. One mass survives incomplete, and at least two more are presumed lost, similarly to other grands motets, Magnificat settings, Lamentations, etc.
