= Christoph Hammer =

German conductor and forte pianist

Christoph Hammer (born 12 June 1966) is a German conductor, forte piano player, musicologist and specialist of historically informed performance.

== Life ==
=== Youth ===
Born in Ensdorf, Hammer passed the Abitur at the Max-Reger-Gymnasium Amberg in 1985. He then studied Germanistic and musicology at LMU Munich and the University of California, Los Angeles as a scholarship holder of the Stiftung Maximilianeum and the Studienstiftung des deutschen Volkes.

=== Forte piano player ===
Since 1989, he has concentrated on the playing of historical keyboard instruments, especially the Hammerklavier. As a soloist, song accompanist and chamber musician, he has gained an international reputation. He regularly works with ensembles such as the Concerto Köln, L'Orfeo Barockorchester, the Nederlands Kammerorchest, the Prague Chamber Orchestra. The same applies to work with vocal and instrumental soloists such as Emma Kirkby, Rufus Müller, Martin Bruns, Jan Kobow, Axel Köhler, Dominik Wörner, Anton Steck, Reinhold Johannes Buhl, Guido Larisch, Martin Sandhoff, Florian Deuter and others. He has made numerous recordings for Oehms Classics, BR and ORF.

=== Tangent piano Player ===
In 2012, Hammer, together with Sylvia Ackermann, presented a tangent piano to the public in a concert. This was discovered in 2006 in Sulzbach-Rosenberg in the estate of Johann Esaias von Seidel in its original state and then elaborately restored.

=== New Hofkapelle Munich ===
In 1996, he founded this ensemble, with which he restages widely unknown music of the 17th and 18th century from the Bavarian residences and churches, for example from Munich and Regensburg.

=== Opera conductor ===
In 2004, he conducted Jean Philippe Rameau's Dardanus at the Stadttheater Passau. In 2005, Hammer took over the conducting of Monteverdi's L'Orfeo at the Landestheater Linz. In 2006, he conducted Handel's Lotario at the Händel Festival Karlsruhe. In 2007, he was responsible for the musical realisation of Reinhard Keiser's Fredegunda with the new Hofkapelle München in a production of the Bayerische Theaterakademie August Everding, which was staged once again in 2008 at the Theater Bremen under Hammer's musical direction. In June 2008, Die Nacht by Einar Schleef had its premiere at the Bayerische Theaterakademie. Hammer took over the musical direction in the production of Anna Viebrock.

=== Teaching activities ===
In 2002, he began teaching at Seattle University and at the University of Music and Theatre Munich. Since August 2009, Hammer has been professor for harpsichord and fortepiano at the University of North Texas. Since August 2017, he is professor for historical keyboard instruments at the Leopold Mozart Centre of the University of Augsburg.

== Honours and awards ==
- 1985: First prize at Jugend musiziert in organ.
- 1985: Special prize for the best interpretation of a contemporary work.
- 2002: Kulturförderpreis of the Free State of Bavaria.
- 2004: Prize of the Bavarian Volksstiftung.
