= Maîtrise de Toulouse =

The Maîtrise de Toulouse was created in 2006 within the Toulouse Conservatoire, becoming the first choir school structure in South-West France. The Maîtrise is a specialised musical education giving life to an acclaimed vocal ensemble. In 2017 the Maîtrise de Toulouse was awarded the Prix Bettencourt for choral music, from the Académie des Beaux-Arts.

== Presentation ==
The Maîtrise gives around ten concerts a year in Toulouse (principally at the Auditorium Saint Pierre des Cuisines, the Basilique Saint-Sernin de Toulouse and the Temple du Salin). The choir performs regularly in festivals and through France including venues such as the Chapelle Royale at Versailles and the Opéra-Comique. It also performs abroad regularly (Spain, Germany, Italy, UK).

The choir's discography has received critical acclaim from the international music press, including 5 Diapasons twice, Critic's choice for the American Record Guide, and Essential Release in the Sunday Times.

The choir's repertoire is extremely rich and varied, both sacred and secular from all periods as well as first performances of new works. Particular attention is paid to French repertoire. The Maîtrise regularly collaborates with other ensembles. The choristers recorded a CD of French fauxbourdon, ‘Polyphonies oubliées’ with the Ensemble Gilles Binchois directed by Dominique Vellard, which received a Diapason Découverte in France and the German critic's prize 'Preis der Deutschen Schallplattenkritik' in the Early Music category. The choir has also performed with the les Sacqueboutiers, Orchestre national du Capitole de Toulouse, Les Passions. Choristers have also sung solo roles at the Théatre du Capitole.

The choristers (aged eleven to fifteen) are educated at the Collège Michelet in specialist classes made up also of instrumentalists and dancers, who are taught in an annexe of the Collège within the buildings of the Conservatoire. They benefit from adapted timetables, allowing them to devote more time to their artistic studies. The choristers perform alone (upper voice repertoire) or with the other elements of the Maîtrise: the ‘juniors’ (soprano and alto) and the lower voices (tenors, baritones and basses who are principally pupils of the conservatoire singing classes and ex choristers, with some professional support).

The Maîtrise is directed by its founder, Mark Opstad.

== Discography ==
- Missa Brevis (2010) Regent Records (UK)
- Motets français (2013) Regent Records
- Polyphonies oubliées (2014) Aparté Records
- Noël français (2015) Regent Records
- Slava! (2017) Regent Records
- Requiem (2020)
- Frank Martin - Messe pour double chœur/Maurice Duruflé - Requiem (2022)
