= Hohenstein-Ernstthal =

- Town
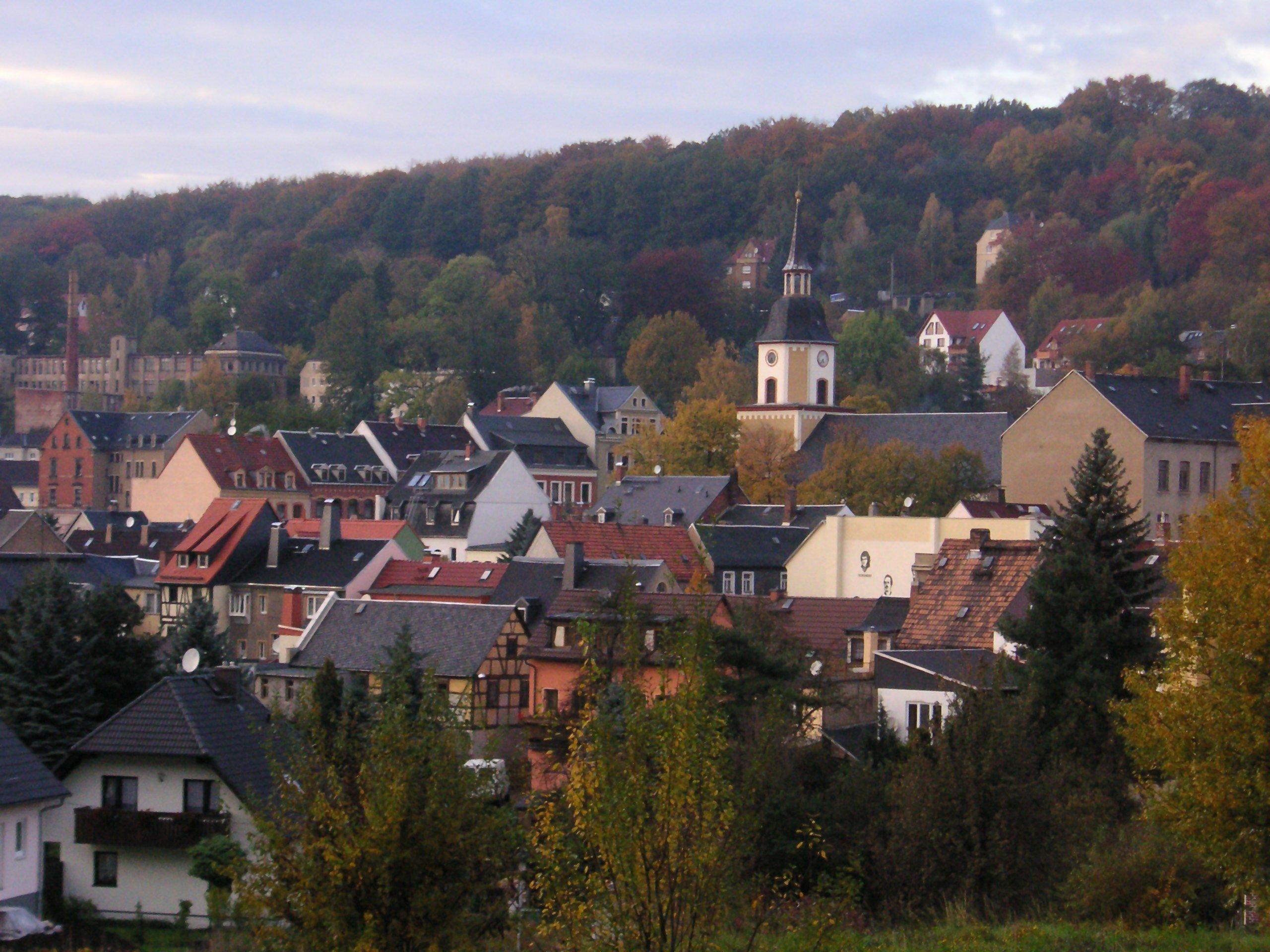
- Hohenstein-Ernstthal

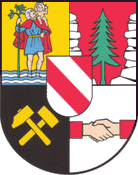
- Coat of arms

- Location of Hohenstein-Ernstthal within Zwickau district
- Interactive map of Hohenstein-Ernstthal
- Location within Germany Location within Saxony
- Coordinates: 50°48′N 12°43′E
- Country: Germany
- State: Saxony
- District: Zwickau

Government
  - Mayor (2019–26): Lars Kluge (CDU)

Area
  - Total: 18.58 km^{2} (7.17 sq mi)
- Elevation: 355 m (1,165 ft)

Population (2025-12-31)
  - Total: 13,681
  - Density: 736.3/km^{2} (1,907/sq mi)
- Time zone: UTC+01:00 (CET)
  - Summer (DST): UTC+02:00 (CEST)
- Postal codes: 09337
- Dialling codes: 03723
- Vehicle registration: Z, GC, HOT, WDA
- Website: hohenstein-ernstthal.de

Hohenstein-Ernstthal (German pronunciation: [ˈhoːənˌʃtaɪn ˈɛʁnstˌtaːl]) is a town in the Zwickau rural district, Saxony, Germany. The towns of Hohenstein and Ernstthal were united in 1898, and the town is either known by its hyphenated form, or simply called Hohenstein.

The town grew in the 15th century after silver mines were established nearby. Ernstthal was named in honor of August Ernst von Schoenburg.

Physicist Gotthilf Heinrich von Schubert and inventor Christoph Gottlieb Schröter were born in Hohenstein. The writer Karl May was born in Ernstthal. The house of his birth is a museum.

Furthermore, Hohenstein-Ernstthal is especially famous for the Sachsenring racing circuit.

== History ==
In the 15th century, the town of Hohenstein was established after silver was found and mined there. The name is said to be derived from the phrase ″uff dem hohen Stein″ (on the high rock), that the first settlers used when they saw the Pfaffenberg mountain. In 1680 some people from Hohenstein moved to the forest near the town to escape the dangers of the plague. That settlement was later named Ernstthal (Ernst valley) after August Ernst von Schönburg. Both town united in 1898, thus becoming Hohenstein-Ernstthal. During 19th and 20th century silver mining became less efficient, so the textile industry became more important. In 1999, Wüstenbrand became a part of Hohenstein-Ernstthal.

== Geography ==
Hohenstein-Ernsthal is located about 15 kilometres (9.3 mi) west of Chemnitz. The Ore Mountains rise south of the city. The highest point of Hohenstein-Ernstthal is the Pfaffenberg north of the town with an elevation of 479 metres (1,572 ft).

== Lord Mayor ==
- 1994-2012 Erich Homilius
- since 2012 Lars Kluge (CDU), he was elected in September 2012 with 91.9% of the votes, and re-elected in 2019 and 2026.

== Transport ==
Hohenstein-Ernstthal is adjacent to the Bundesautobahn 4. There are 2 railway stations, the Hohenstein-Ernstthal station and Wüstenbrand station, both on the Dresden–Werdau railway.

== Notable people ==
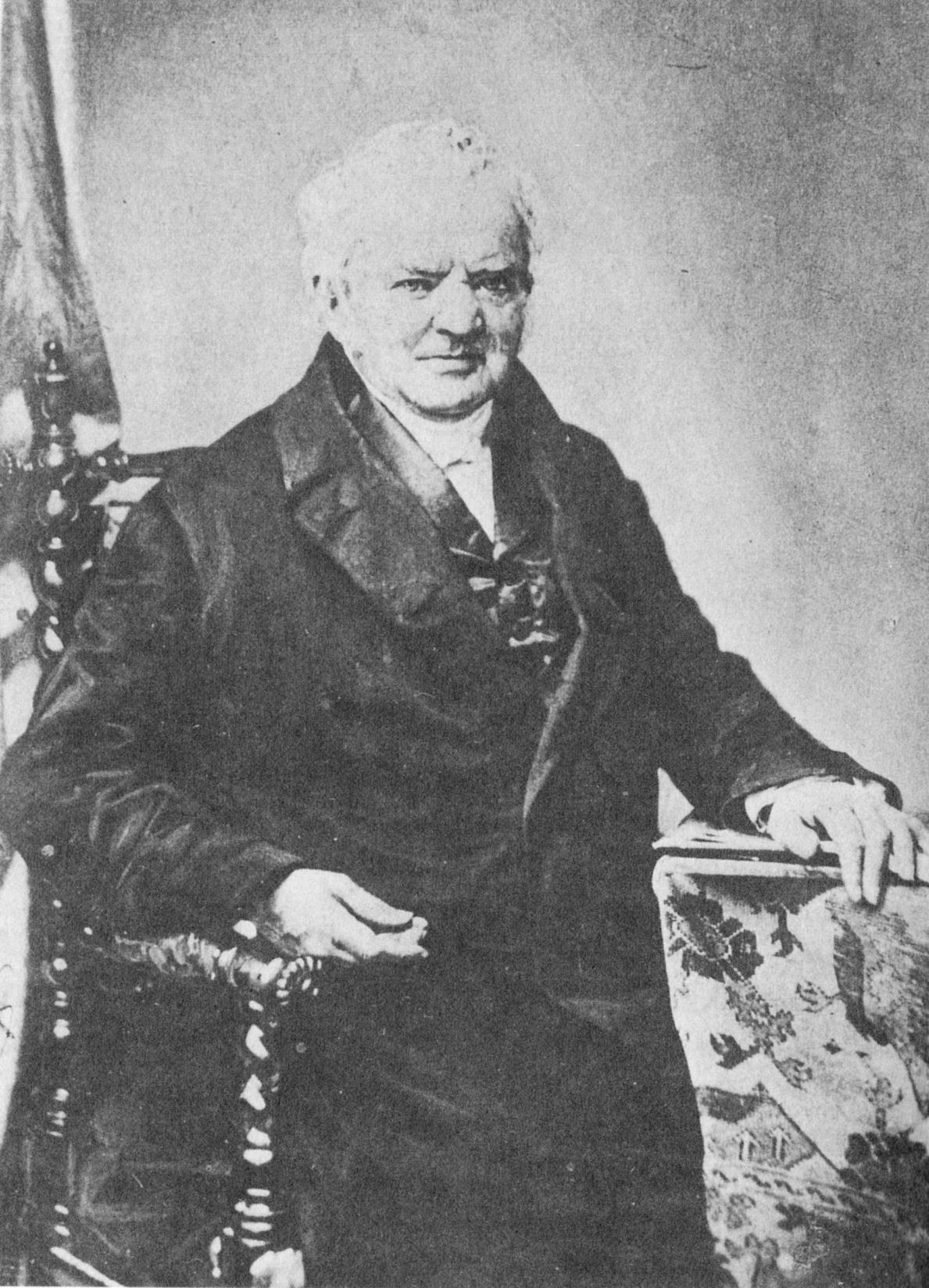
Gotthilf Heinrich von Schubert

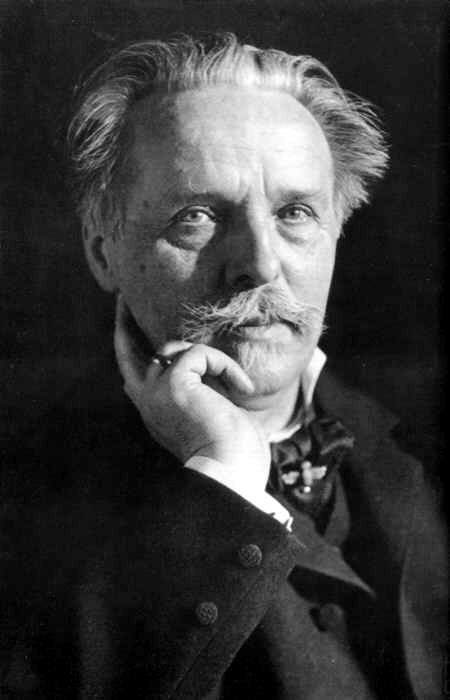
Karl May in 1907

- Karl May (1842–1912), author
- Hans-Uwe Pilz (born 1958), football player and trainer
- Hans Wolfgang Reinhard, general
- Christoph Gottlieb Schröter (1699-1782) composer and organist
- Gotthilf Heinrich von Schubert (1780–1860), natural scientist
- Heinz Tetzner (1920-2007), painter and printmaker
