= Roman de Fauvel =

14th-century French poem

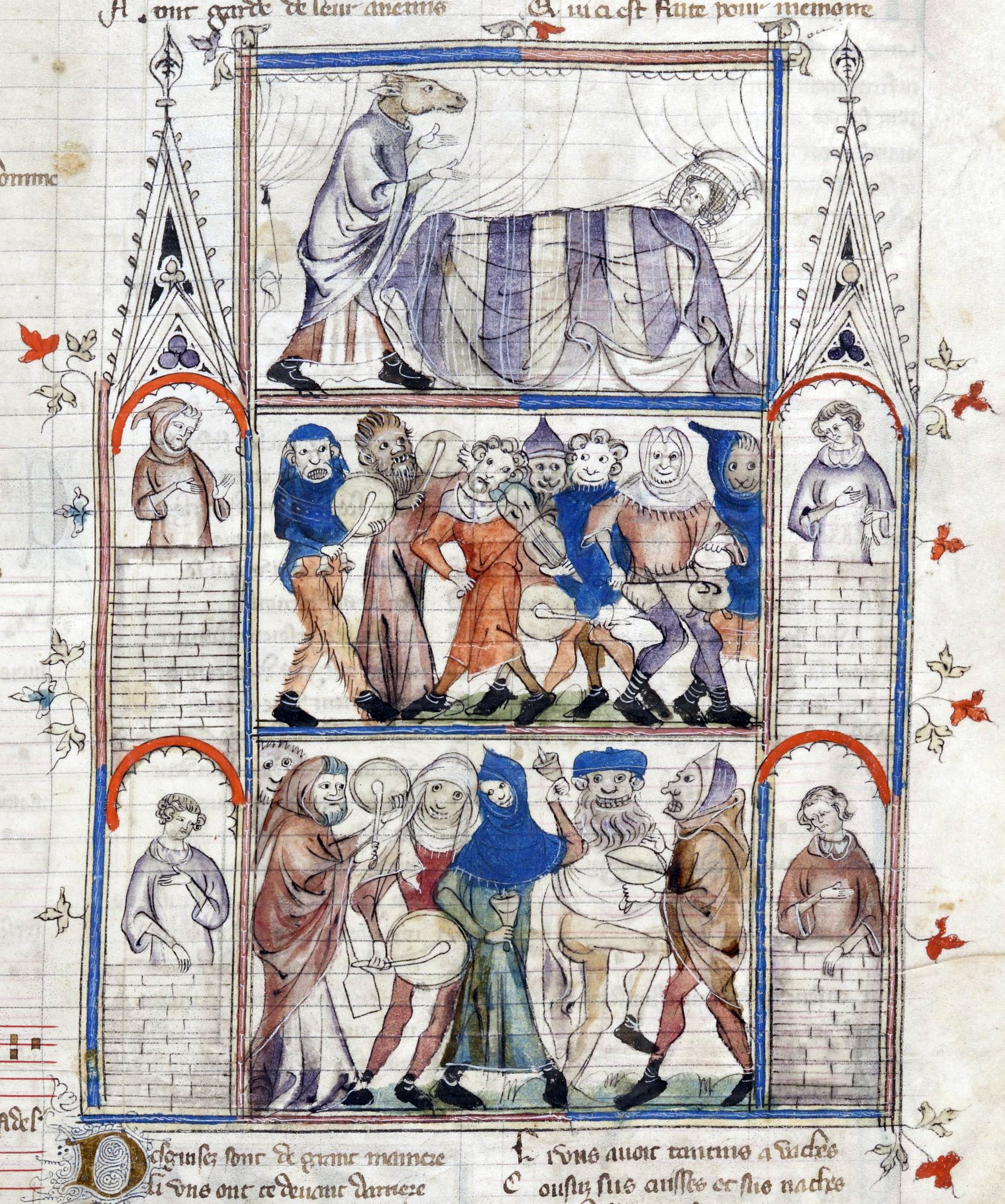
As the horse Fauvel is about to join Vainglory in the bridal bed, the people form a charivari in protest. From the Roman de Fauvel.

The Roman de Fauvel is a 14th-century French allegorical verse romance of satirical bent, generally attributed to Gervais du Bus, a clerk at the French royal chancery. The original narrative of 3,280 octosyllabics is divided into two books, dated to 1310 and 1314 respectively, during the reigns of Philip IV and Louis X. In 1316–7 Chaillou de Pesstain produced a greatly expanded version.

The romance features Fauvel, a fallow-colored horse who rises to prominence in the French royal court, and through him satirizes the self-serving hedonism and hypocrisy of men, and the excesses of the ruling estates, both secular and ecclesiastical. The antihero's name can be broken down to mean "false veil", and also forms an acrostic F-A-V-V-E-L with the letters standing for the human vices: Flattery, Avarice, Vileness, Variability (Fickleness), Envy, and Laxity. The romance also gave birth to the English expression "curry fauvel", the obsolete original form of "curry favor". The work is reminiscent of a similar tract in the 13th-century Roman de la Rose, though owes more to the animal fabliaux of Reynard the Fox.

Chaillou's manuscript (Paris, BN fr. 146) is a splendid work of art with illuminations by the painter known as the maître de Fauvel, as well as being of considerable musicological interest due to interpolations of 169 pieces of music, which span the gamut of thirteenth- and early fourteenth-century genres and textures. Some of these pieces are linked to Philippe de Vitry and the nascent musical style referred to as Ars Nova.

== Plot ==
The poem revolves around the central figure, an ambitious and foolish horse, called Fauvel. The horse's name itself is rife with symbolism. "Fauvel" comes from the color of its coat, which is "muddy beige" (or fallow-colored) (Note: The corresponding modern French fauve denotes a darker shade of brown, and the color has also been described by other commentators as "fawn" or "dun".) and symbolic of Vanity. The name breaks down to fau-vel, or "false veil", and is furthermore an acronym F-A-V-V-E-L taken from the head letters of these vices: Flattery, Avarice, Vileness, Variability (Fickleness), Envy, and Laxity (Flaterie, Avarice, Vilanie, Varieté, Envie, Lascheté).

The first book is a rebuke against the clergy and society, tainted by Sin and corruption. Fauvel though he is a horse no longer resides in a stable, but is set up in a grand house (the royal palace in fact) by the grace of Dame Fortune, the goddess of Fate. He changes his residence to suit his needs, and has a custom manger and hayrack built. In his garderobe (toilet) he has those from the religious order stroking him to make sure "no dung can remain on him." Church and secular leaders far and wide make pilgrimages to see him, and bow to him in servitude. These potentates condescend to brush and clean Fauvel from his tonsured head to tail. These fawning groomers are said to "curry" (Old French: torcher) Fauvel in the original phrasing of the work, and this is where the English expression "curry favour" has originated, corrupted from the earlier form "curry fauvel."

Fauvel travels to Macrocosmos and asks Dame Fortune for her hand in marriage. She denies him, but in her stead she proposes he wed Lady Vainglory. Fauvel agrees, and the wedding takes place, with such guests present as Flirtation, Adultery, Carnal Lust, and Venus, in a technique similar to that of the Morality plays of the 15th and 16th centuries.

Finally, Dame Fortune reveals that Fauvel's role in the world is to give birth to more iniquitous rulers like himself, and to be a harbinger of the Antichrist.

The manuscript was written to criticise King Philip IV, but direct attacks on his character were too dangerous. Instead, the king's second in command, Enguerrand de Marigny was the model for Fauvel.

== Text ==
The Roman de Fauvel is a poem of 3280 octasyllabic rhyming couplets, divided into two books: Book 1 in 1226 verses, completed 1310 according to its last verse; and Book 2, in 2054 verses, completed 1314 according to its explicit. In 1316–7 Chaillou de Pe[s]stain (a still unidentified member of a family of bureaucrats) augmented this text with an additional 3000 verses spanning both books (1800 lines of which are spent on Fauvel's wedding).

=== Surviving copies ===
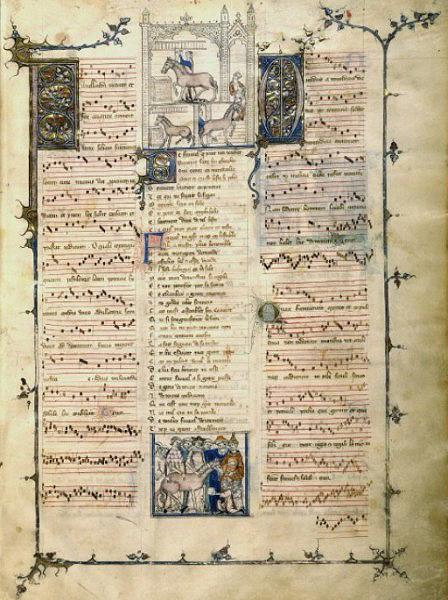
Opening page (fol. 1r) from manuscript of Fauvel, BN fr. 146.

The earliest manuscript to survive contains Chaillou's expanded version in his own hand (Paris, BN fr. 146). The dozen or so other extant manuscripts are of the non-interpolated form, and these continued to be copied into the fifteenth century. (Note: "dozen or so" — Långfors's edition counted 11 mss. of the shorter version, which other commentators have followed (Rosenberg & Tischler 1991, Regalado 1995a). But there is one fragment Långfors did not include in his tally, and in 1994 Mühlethaler published the existence of two previously unnoticed manuscript sources (1 complete copy and 1 fragment).) Chaillou's deluxe manuscript is illustrated with 78 miniatures, and inserts 169 musical pieces, woven into a complex mise-en-page.

== Music ==
Of all the surviving manuscript versions of Le Roman de Fauvel, the copy compiled by Chaillou de Pesstain (BN fr. 146), has attracted the most musicological attention due to the interpolated musical pieces in musical notation, which span the gamut of thirteenth- and early fourteenth-century genres and textures. The 169 pieces all have lyrics, 124 in Latin, 45 in French. (Note: Or 106 in Latin, 60 in French, and 3 bilingual.) The genres cover the liturgical and devotional, sacred and profane, monophonic and polyphonic, chant, old and new music. Some of these pieces are thought to have been composed by Philippe de Vitry. While these pieces were once thought of as arbitrarily selected repertory for textual "accompaniment", recent scholarship (such as "Fauvel Studies" and Dillon's "Music-Making") has tended to focus on the ingenious intertextual/glossing role(s) played by musical notation – both visual and aural – in augmenting and diversifying the (political) themes of Gervais' admonitio. Amongst other curious discoveries are the inclusion of numerous "false" chants (Rankin) interspersed between actual liturgical material, perhaps a direct musical play on the deceptive qualities of its equine trickster. Much attention has also been paid to fr. 146's numerous polyphonic motets, some of which (In Nova Fert, for example) exhibit red notation of newer mensural notational innovations generally described under the umbrella of ars nova.

Although the text of the Roman de Fauvel is not particularly well known, the music has been frequently performed and recorded. The question of how the entire work would have been read or staged in the 14th century is the subject of academic debate. Some have suggested that BN fr. 146 could have been intended as a theatrical performance. This hypothesis contradicts the concurrent opinion that the Roman de Fauvel is mainly an anthology. Modern performance projects, live and recorded, based on the BN 146 manuscript of the "Roman de Fauvel", involving text, music, and at times staging or semi-staging, have been created by the Studio der Fruehen Musik, the Clemencic Consort, and The Boston Camerata, among others. Camerata's version has toured extensively in the U.S. and Europe, and was last seen at the 2011 Boston Early Music Festival.

=== Discography ===
The first recording of the work was made in 1972 by the Studio der Frühen Musik (Studio of Early Music) on the EMI Reflexe label, directed by Thomas Binkley. This recording is currently available as part of a 5-CD box set on the Virgin label. The speaker of the verses uses the original old French, including some now very odd-sounding pronunciations of still familiar French words. It has been suggested that the musical interludes have some, especially for that time, poignantly dissonances and counterpoints, which likely serve to illustrate the mocking nature of the whole story. The musical style of the polyphonies, nonetheless, is characteristic of the period in general.

The recording of the Roman de Fauvel by The Boston Camerata, directed by Joel Cohen, was made in 1991 for Erato Disques. As of mid-2015, it was still available from Warner Classics. Erato also produced, the same year, a "video book" of the Roman de Fauvel. The video project was shown to audiences at the Louvre Museum, Paris, and at several conferences/colloquia; it was, however, never released commercially.

== See also ==
- Ars nova
- Medieval music#France: Ars nova
- Guillaume de Machaut
- Philippe de Vitry
- Allegory in the Middle Ages
