= Crawford Young =

American lutenist and musicologist

Crawford Young is an American lutenist and musicologist residing in Basel, Switzerland. He is the director of the Ferrara Ensemble, Ensemble Project Ars Nova, Shield of Harmony, and is a long time accompanist of Andreas Scholl.

== Life and career ==
Robert Crawford Young graduated in 1976 from New England Conservatory in Boston, where he played classical guitar, lute, and tenor banjo. At Stanford University, he came in 1977 into contact with Thomas Binkley from 1978-1981 was active with Sequentia of Benjamin Bagby and Barbara Thornton in Cologne as performer on the lute and gittern. Since 1982, Young has taught medieval lute and medieval music performance practice at the Schola Cantorum Basiliensis, where he also performs.

In 1982, Young was a founding member of Ensemble P.A.N. (Project Ars Nova), along with Laurie Monahan (mezzo-soprano), Michael Collver (countertenor and corno muto) and first performed in Paris in 1982. For their American debut in Boston in 1984, Shira Kammen (bowed strings) and John Fleagle (tenor and medieval harp) joined the group. The group ceased to perform in 1999, following the death from cancer of John Fleagle.

The Basel-based Ferrara Ensemble was founded almost simultaneously with Ensemble P.A.N., in 1983. Since the ensemble includes students at the Schola Cantorum, membership is fluid. Members have included: Randall Cook (viola d’arco, vielle), Lena Susanne Norin (contralto), Kathleen Dineen (soprano), Debra Gomez (harp), Stephen Grant (baritone), Norihisa Sugawara (lute), Marion Fourquier (harp), Miriam Andersen (mezzo-soprano, harp), Masako Art (harp), Raitis Grigalis (baritone), Els Janssens (mezzo-soprano), Eve Kopli (soprano), Jessica Marshall (viola d’arco), Eric Mentzel (tenor), Karl-Heinz Schickhaus (dulce melos).

Young is considered by many to be the premier interpreter of repertory for Medieval and Renaissance lute.

== Publications ==
- Chapter 25 On the trail of ensemble music in the fifteenth century in Companion to Medieval and Renaissance Music.

== Recordings ==
=== With Ensemble P.A.N. (Project Ars Nova) ===
- Ars Magis Subtiliter. Secular Music of the Chantilly Codex. New Albion Records, 1989.
- The Island of St. Hylarion. Music of Cyprus 1413-1422. New Albion Records, 1991.
- Hommage to Johannes Ciconia. ca. 1370-1412. New Albion Records, 1992.
- Machaut: Remède de Fortune. New Albion Records, 1994.
- Unseen Rain: Music by Robert Kyr. New Albion Records, 1994.

=== With Ferrara Ensemble ===
- Alexander Agricola: Secular music. Deutsche Harmonia Mundi, 1990, 2010
- Forse che si, forse che no - Musique de danse du Quattrocento. Fonti Musicali 182.
- Hildebrandston: Chansonniers Allemands du XV^{e} siècle. Producer Michel Bernstein Arcana A35.
- Balades a III chans de Johan Robert "Trebor" & al. Arcana A32 1994 "Helas pitié envers moy dort si fort" etc. reissued in Figures of Harmony: Songs of Codex Chantilly c.1390 4CD 2015
- Fleurs de vertus: Chansons subtiles à la fin du XIV^{è} siècle. Arcana A40 "Pictagoras Jabol et Orpheüs" etc. reissued in Figures of Harmony: Songs of Codex Chantilly c.1390 4CD 2015
- The Whyte Rose: Poétique anglo-bourguignone au temps de Charles le Téméraire. Arcana A301.
- En doulz chastel de Pavie: Chansons à la cour des Visconti, 1400. (Songs for the court of Visconti, 1400) Schola Cantorum Basiliensis "Documenta", Harmonia Mundi 905241 "De ma doulour" reissued in Figures of Harmony: Songs of Codex Chantilly c.1390 4CD 2015
- Machaut: Mercy ou Mort - Chansons & motets d'amour. Arcana A305
- Walter Frye: Northerne Wynde. Marc Aurel Edition 20018
- Corps Femenin: L’avant-Garde de Jean Duc de Berry. Senleches, Trebor, Solage. Arcana, recorded 2000 & 2008, issued 2010. Angelorum psalat tripudium etc. reissued in Figures of Harmony: Songs of Codex Chantilly c.1390 4CD 2015

=== With Shield of Harmony ===
- Oswald von Wolkenstein: Songs of Myself Andreas Scholl. Harmonia Mundi, 2010
