= Schmahl =

Schmahl is a German surname. Notable people with the surname include:

- Frederik Schmahl (born 2002), German footballer
- Christoph Friedrich Schmahl (1739-1814), German musical instrument maker
- Günter Schmahl (1936-2018), German physicist and professor
- Gustav Schmahl (1929-2003), German violinist and university lecturer
- Jeanne Schmahl (1846-1915), French feminist
- Julius A. Schmahl (1867-1955), American politician

== See also ==
- Schmal
