= Ladurner =

Ladurner is a surname. Notable people with the surname include:

- Josef Alois Ladurner (1769–1851), Austrian composer
- Sabine Ladurner (born 1960), Italian middle-distance and cross-country runner
