= Jean Gilles (composer) =

French composer (1668–1705)

Jean Gilles (8 January 1668 – 5 February 1705) was a French composer, born at Tarascon.

== Biography ==
After receiving his musical training as a choirboy at the Cathedral of Saint-Sauveur at Aix-en-Provence, he succeeded his teacher Guillaume Poitevin as music master there. After moving on several times, he became music master at the Cathedral of St Etienne at Toulouse in 1697, as the successor of André Campra. His musical style was influenced by Campra, as were most musicians of his day. He composed motets and a famous requiem, which was performed for the first time at his own funeral (because the original commissioner thought it too expensive to perform) but was later sung at the funeral services for Jean-Philippe Rameau in 1764, Stanisław Leszczyński, King of Poland in 1766, and Louis XV in 1774. His motets were played frequently from 1728 to 1771 at the Concert Spirituel. His choral works often alternate passages sung by the soloists with those sung by the chorus. In 1752, in Lettres sur les hommes célèbres du règne de Louis XIV, Pierre-Louis d'Aquin said that Gilles would doubtless have replaced Lalande if he had lived long enough. Gilles died suddenly at the age of 37 in Toulouse.

== Works ==
- Requiem (1705)
- Mass
- Te Deum
- 24 grands motets
- 5 motets for grand choeur
- 3 psalms
- 10 airs for solo voices, transcribed from the grands motets.
- Leçons de ténèbres

== Selected recordings ==
The Requiem is one of the most frequently recorded of all French baroque works. Recordings include two early recordings conducted by Louis Frémaux (1957) and (1965), then two landmark recordings conducted by Philippe Herreweghe - the first paired with the Carillon des morts of Michel Corrette (1709-1795) performed by the Collegium Vocale Gent and Musica Antiqua Köln for Archiv (1981) the second with La Chapelle Royale for Harmonia Mundi (1990). Other recordings include the Boston Camerata directed by Joel Cohen (1989), Le Concert Spirituel and Hervé Niquet (2000), and Les Passions directed by Jean-Marc Andrieu (3 different recordings in 2007, 2009, 2012 and a pack of 3 CDs in 2013), Les Folies françoises, Les Pages & Les Chantres du Centre de musique baroque de Versailles conducted by Fabien Armengaud, CD CVS 2023.
