= Schmal =

Schmal is a German surname. Notable people with the surname include:

- Adolf Schmal (1872-1919), Austrian fencer and racing cyclist
- George W. Schmal (1849-1923), American Army blacksmith
- Jesús González Schmal (born 1923), Mexican lawyer

== See also ==
- Schmahl
