= Josef Alois Ladurner =

Josef Alois Ladurner (7 March 1769 – 20 February 1851) was an Austrian composer from a widespread South Tyrol musician family. He was the brother of the pianist and composer Ignaz Anton Ladurner. After studies at the Benediktbeuern monastery, he became organist at his native Algund in 1784. He also studied piano and composition with Josef Graetz. After becoming a priest in Brixen in 1799 and later court chaplain and consistorial councillor, he continued directing choirs and teaching, active at the Innsbruck and Salzburg music societies. He died in Brixen in 1851.

His compositions were highly regarded by his contemporaries. Besides church music and organ works, they include many fantasias and variations for the piano, some of them published by Schott in Mainz and Falter in Munich.

Ladurner owned a clavichord by Christoph Friedrich Schmahl of Regensburg, in Bavaria. He wrote to Robert Schumann in a letter of 28 February 1838: "As for myself, my favourite entertainment is by means of my excellent Schmahl clavichord, which sounds wonderful. It is the only instrument I have used to draft all my compositions."
