= Orchestrina di camera =

Musical instrument

The orchestrina di camera (or clavecin harmonique) is a small keyboard instrument invented around the 1860s by the English builder of harmoniums and organs, Cheltenham-born W. E. Evans (1810–1884).

The orchestrina di camera, which resembled a harmonium, had stops that allowed it to imitate such instruments as flute, oboe, clarinet, bassoon, and horn, and was intended to stand in for them in small orchestras lacking the relevant musicians.
