= Pfaffenberg (Hohenstein-Ernstthal) =

Mountain in Germany

Coordinates: 50°48′42″N 12°43′23″E

Highest point
- Elevation: 479 m (1,572 ft)

Geography
- Location: Saxony, Germany

Pfaffenberg is a mountain in Hohenstein-Ernstthal in the state of Saxony, southeastern Germany. It is part of the Saxon Uplands.

In 1911 a mountain inn was built on Pfaffenberg by the Ore Mountain Club, however in 2014 it was temporarily closed for renovations and has yet to fully reopen.

In the 1860s, the Royal Saxon Triangulation operated station number 16 on the Pfaffenberg. The triangulation point is still visible.

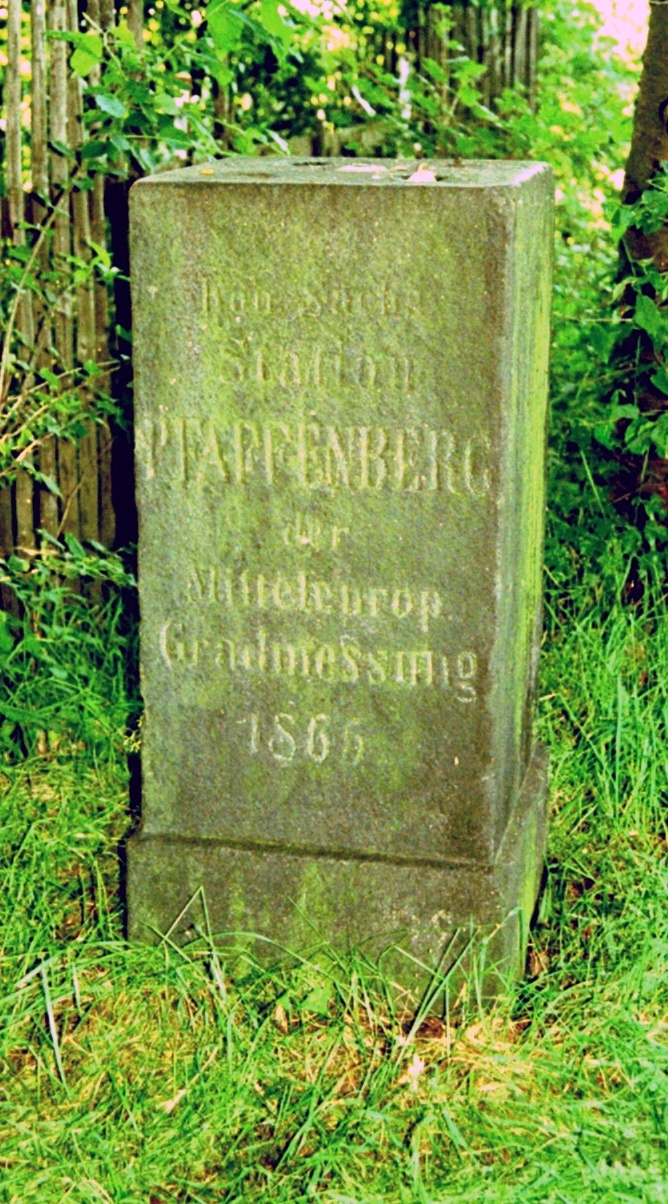
Former triangulation point
