= Mark Opstad =

British conductor (born 1978)

Mark Opstad (born 1978) is an Anglo-French choral conductor based in France. He founded and directs the Maîtrise de Toulouse (Conservatoire de Toulouse), a critically acclaimed choir based at the Toulouse Conservatoire which has become one of the leading choir school model choirs In France. The choir was awarded the Prix Bettencourt for choral music from the Académie des Beaux-Arts in 2017.

Opstad was a chorister at Bristol Cathedral and Organ Scholar of Balliol College, Oxford where he studied Music. He was subsequently Assistant Organist of Clare College, Cambridge before moving to France.

== Discography ==
- Missa Brevis (2010) Regent Records (UK)
- Motets français (2013) Regent Records
- Polyphonies oubliées (2014) Aparté Records
- Noël français (2015) Regent Records
- Slava! (2017) Regent Records
- Requiem (2020)
- Frank Martin - Messe pour double choeur /Maurice Duruflé - Requiem (2022)
