= Christoph Gottlieb Schröter =

German organist

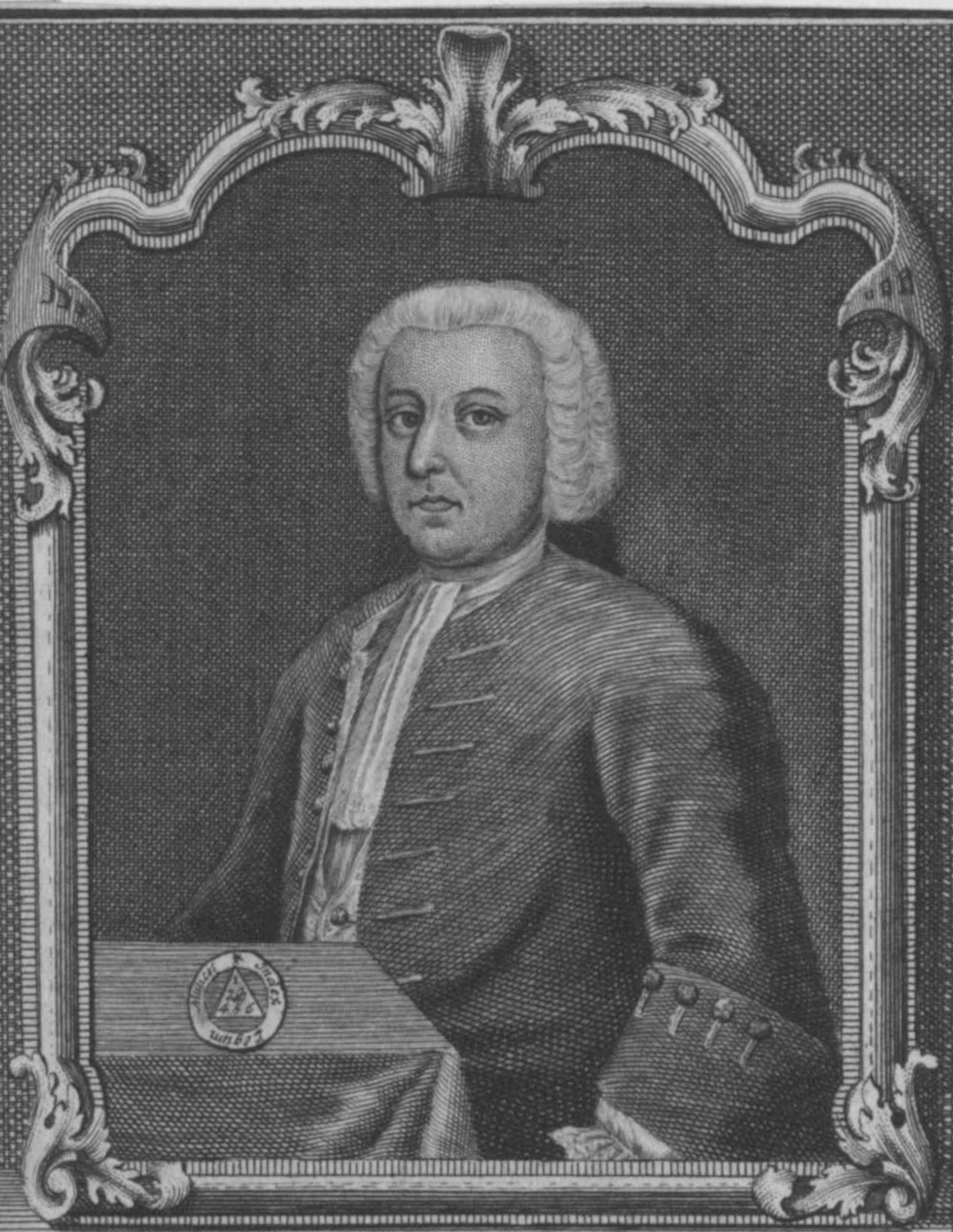
Schröter, c. 18th century, portrait engraving by an unknown artist

Christoph Gottlieb Schröter (10 August 1699 – 20 May 1782), was a German composer and organist, who is best known for his contributions to the tangent piano, which in 1717 he invented a keyboard instrument whose strings were not plucked, but struck by hammers.

== Biography ==
Born in Hohenstein-Ernstthal, Schröter showed his musical ability as a choirboy in the Staatskapelle Dresden, becoming a student of Johann Christoph Schmidt. In 1717, at the age of 18, he went to the Kreuzschule in Dresden and studied theology. While studying, his mother died, to which he went back to the Staatskapelle to study music and was recommended as a amanuensis to composer Antonio Lotti, which to him was a great honour.

Schröter was later employed as a secretary and musical associate to an unknown man, who he would travel with throughout Germany, Netherlands and England. Schröter would later in 1724 settle in Jena where he would teach open lectures about music theory at the University of Jena. In 1726, he became an Organist at the St. Martini Church in Minden, he was called "one of the bravest organists of our time" by Ernst Ludwig Gerber. He would reside in Minden until 1732 when he traveled to Nordhausen, where he would continue being an Organist at the St. Nikolai Church until his death in 1782.

== Literature ==
- Deutliche Anweisung zum Generalbaß (1772)
- Lezte Beschäftigung mit musicalischen Dingen (1782)
