= Chaillou =

Chaillou is a French surname. Notable people with the surname include:

- Antoine-Jean Amelot de Chaillou (1732–1795), French politician
- Auguste Chaillou (1866–1915), French biologist and physician
- Jean-Jacques Amelot de Chaillou (1689–1749), French politician
- Narcisse Chaillou (1835–1916), French painter
- Timothée Chaillou, French art curator and critic
