= Dulce melos =

Early keyboard instrument

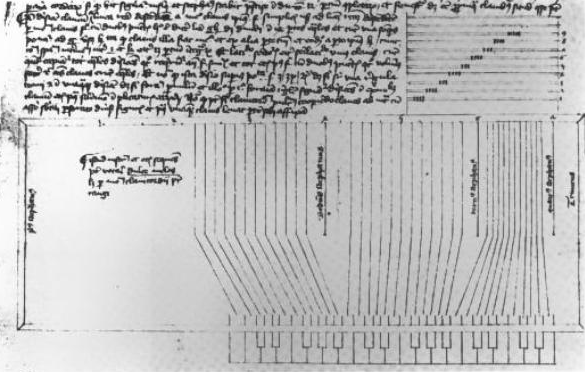
Diagram of a dulce melos from Henri-Arnault de Zwolle's 1440 manuscript.

The dulce melos (or doucemelle) is an early keyboard instrument and possible ancestor of the piano. The instrument is described as a type of zither, similar to a hammered dulcimer, but with the strings struck by hammers on keys. The instrument had twelve pairs of strings, each divided into three sections in a 4:2:1 ratio, resulting in a full chromatic octave of 36 notes, as each note is divided into two higher octaves by the bridges. Among the instrument's first attestations was a 1440 work by Henri-Arnault de Zwolle.

The instrument was researched in the 1844 publication Dissertation sur les instruments de musique au moyen-age by Bottée de Toulmon, which detailed a piano-like instrument detailed in a 15th-century Latin manuscript.
