= Wüstenbrand station =

Railway station in Hohenstein-Ernstthal, Germany

Wüstenbrand
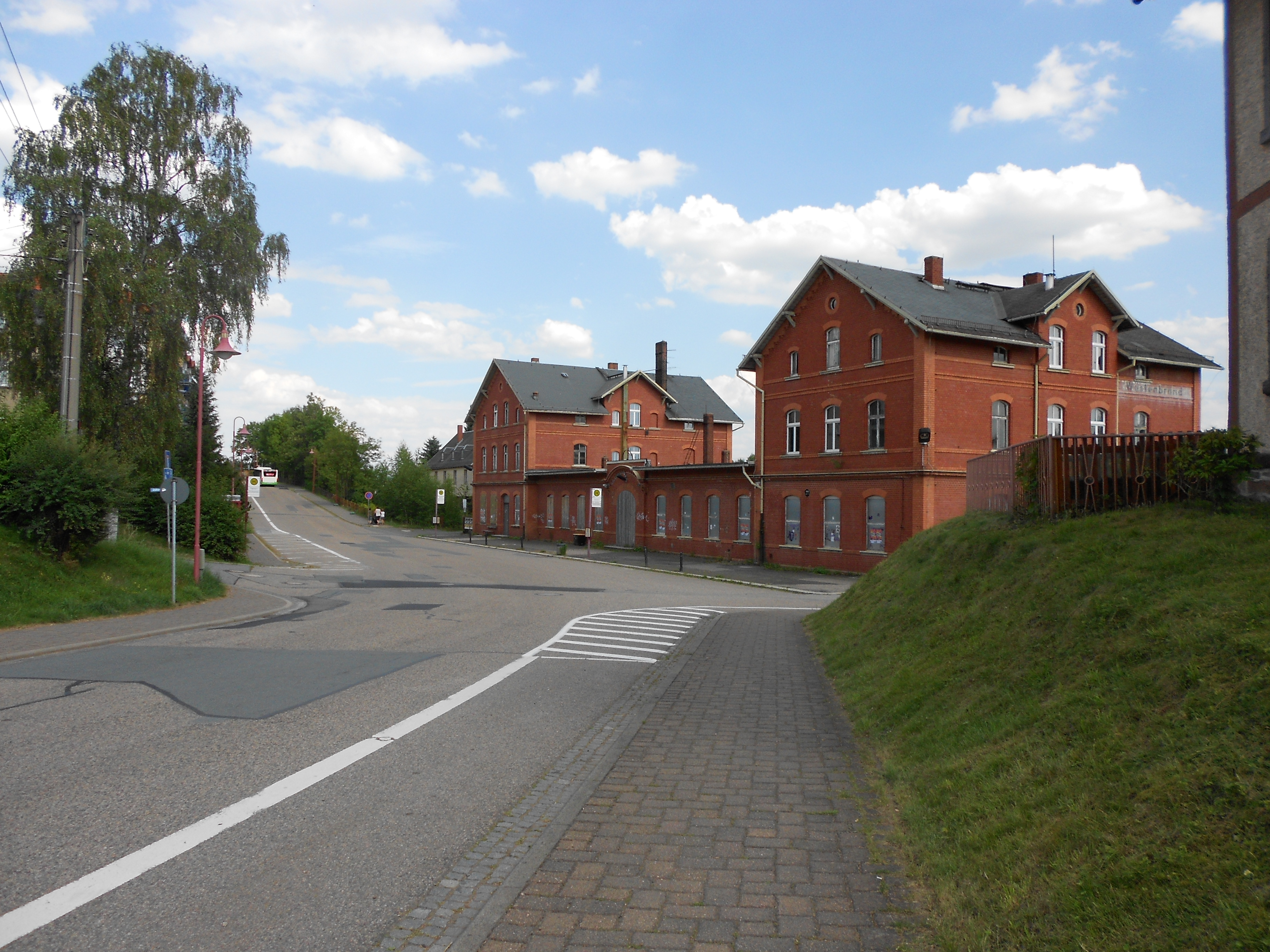

General information
- Location: Bahnhofstr. 18, Hohenstein-Ernstthal, Saxony; Germany
- Coordinates: 50°48′20″N 12°45′24″E
- Lines: Dresden–Werdau railway (km 94.31); former Neuoelsnitz–Wüstenbrand (km 13.00); former Neuoelsnitz–Wüstenbrand (km 12.14)
- Platforms: 2

Construction
- Accessible: Platform 1 only

Other information
- Station code: 6952
- DS100 code: DWD
- IBNR: 8010388
- Category: 6
- Website: www.bahnhof.de

History
- Opened: 1 November 1858

Services
Preceding station	Mitteldeutsche Regiobahn	Following station
Hohenstein-Ernstthal towards Zwickau Hbf	RB 30	Grüna (Sachs) towards Dresden Hbf
Location
- Location within Saxony Location within Germany Location within Europe

Wüstenbrand station is a station on the Dresden–Werdau railway in the south west of the German State of Saxony. In the past, it was a terminus for the secondary lines to Limbach-Oberfrohna and Neuoelsnitz. Currently, it serves as a through station.

== History ==
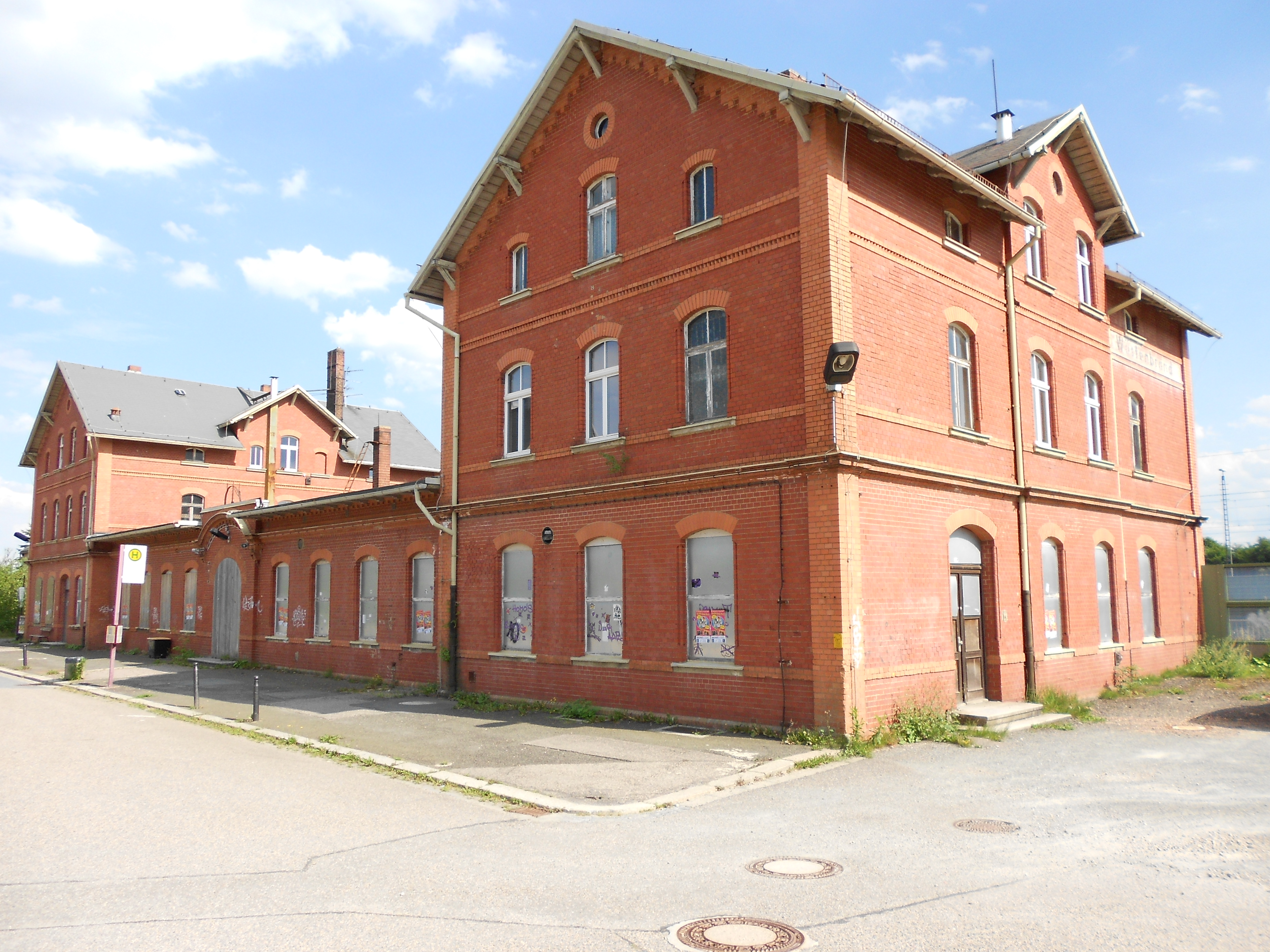
Wüstenbrand station (2013)

The station was built along with the Dresden–Werdau railway in 1858 as a connecting station to the Keilbahnhof ("wedge station", referring to the wedge between the branching tracks) of the coal railway to Lugau (which was later extended to Neuoelsnitz). Using a connecting curve, the coal trains could also run directly to Chemnitz. As early as August 1862, the station had to be expanded, since public passenger and goods traffic to Lugau were permitted from then on.

The line to Limbach was opened in 1897 and the system of tracks was expanded again. In 1899, a new entrance building and a workshop were built at a cost of about 85,000 marks for the same reason.

Already in the 1950s, the station began to decline and passenger and freight traffic to Limbach were discontinued in 1950 and the rest of the line to Grüna was assigned to the Chemnitz–Obergrüna line. After Die Wende, the traffic to Neuoelsnitz also disappeared in 1990.

In the 1995/96 timetable, the 1667 express from Munich to Dresden stopped in Wüstenbrand every Friday.

During the upgrade of the Saxon-Franconian trunk line, the system of tracks was extensively rationalised in the late 1990s, leaving only two passing loops with outside platforms and two sidings.
