= Johann Esaias von Seidel =

German printer

Johann Esaias von Seidel (28 April 1758 – 20 November 1827) was a printer, publisher and publicist in the 19th century who promoted the reforms of Maximilian von Montgelas. He also promoted ecumenism, the concept of unity among different Christian denominations.

== Life and career ==
=== Origin and childhood ===
Seidel was born in Ortenburg, Bavaria, on 28 April 1758. He was the fourth of eight children of the Protestant pastor Georg Stephan Alexander Seidel and his wife Anna Margarete (née Faust). As early as 1766, Seidel moved from Ortenburg to Sulzbach to join his uncle, Georg Abraham Lorenz Lichtenthaler (1711-1780), at his printshop. He was the fourth generation to run the oldest of four publishing houses there (founded in 1664).

=== Seidel as a printer and publisher ===
Seidel learned the printing trade from his uncle, Lichtenthaler, and went on a journey in 1777 which led him to Johann Baptist Rotermundt in Regensburg, among others. When he was offered the position of factor there in 1780, Lichtenthaler died. At the request of his widow, Seidel returned to Sulzbach to continue running the publishing house. In 1785 Seidel bought it and also took over the Lutheran (1790) and the Catholic (1797) printing works together with their privileges. Seidel rapidly expanded the business. In 1790 he was appointed Royal Bavarian Kommerzienrat. He established close contacts with the modern North German book trade and created a wide network of relationships in art and culture, church and politics, state administration, education and science.

In 1821, he was raised to hereditary nobility. He died on 20 November 1827. Contemporaries (such as the publisher Friedrich Christoph Perthes in 1823) praised Seidel's extraordinary business acumen, which was always coupled with a comprehensive sense of social responsibility. In 1822, for example, he took in the Hebrew printing house that had been affected by a fire in the city, even though doing so caused him capacity bottlenecks.

Seidel died in Sulzbach at the age of 69.

== Intellectual-historical significance ==
=== Promoter of the Bavarian reforms ===
Like the Prussian Reform Movement in Prussia, Maximilian von Montgelas, supported by the Barons of Aretin, Seidel pushed for administrative modernisation in Bavaria. Seidel had a relationship of trust with Count Montgelas, so that the official publications of the Bavarian government were published by his publishing house. Conversely, Seidel supported Montgelas' reforms by publishing a journal entitled The Genius of Bavaria under Maximilian IV from 1801 to 1804, edited by Johann Georg von Aretin. Its task was to place the former grievances in State and public life in clear contrast to Montgelas' reforms.

The monthly journal Allemania, which Johann Georg's younger brother Johann Christoph von Aretin published from 1815 to 1816, turned against the romantic nationalism, especially as espoused by Ernst Moritz Arndt and Johann Gottlieb Fichte and opposed it with the enlightened spirit of the Bavarian state reformers.

=== Patrons of the Irenics ===
Seidel's significance for South German intellectual culture around 1800 lies in his consistently irenic attitude. Today, Irenicism would be understood as ecumenism. Seidel mediated not only between Protestantism and Catholicism, but also between Enlightenment and Romanticism, North and South Germany. As a pioneer of ecumenism, he built up an interdenominational Bible institute with great commitment. Here, from 1810 onwards, a common Bible edition for Catholics, Lutherans and Reformed was published for the first time with royal Bavarian privilege.

Although Seidel himself was Protestant, his company became one of the most important publishers for Southern German Catholicism in the 19th century.

=== Saving Sulzbach Castle ===
In 1807, Seidel acquired the Burg Sulzbach, which had been empty since 1794, and brought together all his business premises there. He thus saved the castle from decay. On the Schlossberg he had elaborate terraced gardens laid out and a "Pantheon" with 18 portrait busts of important scholars, churchmen and statesmen erected. The sculptor Joseph Kirchmayer was involved in both projects. Among other things, he created a life-size Minerva statue made of lead for Sulzbach, which is considered a prime example of the newer Bavarian metal casting and today adorns the backyard in front of the Seidel Hall.

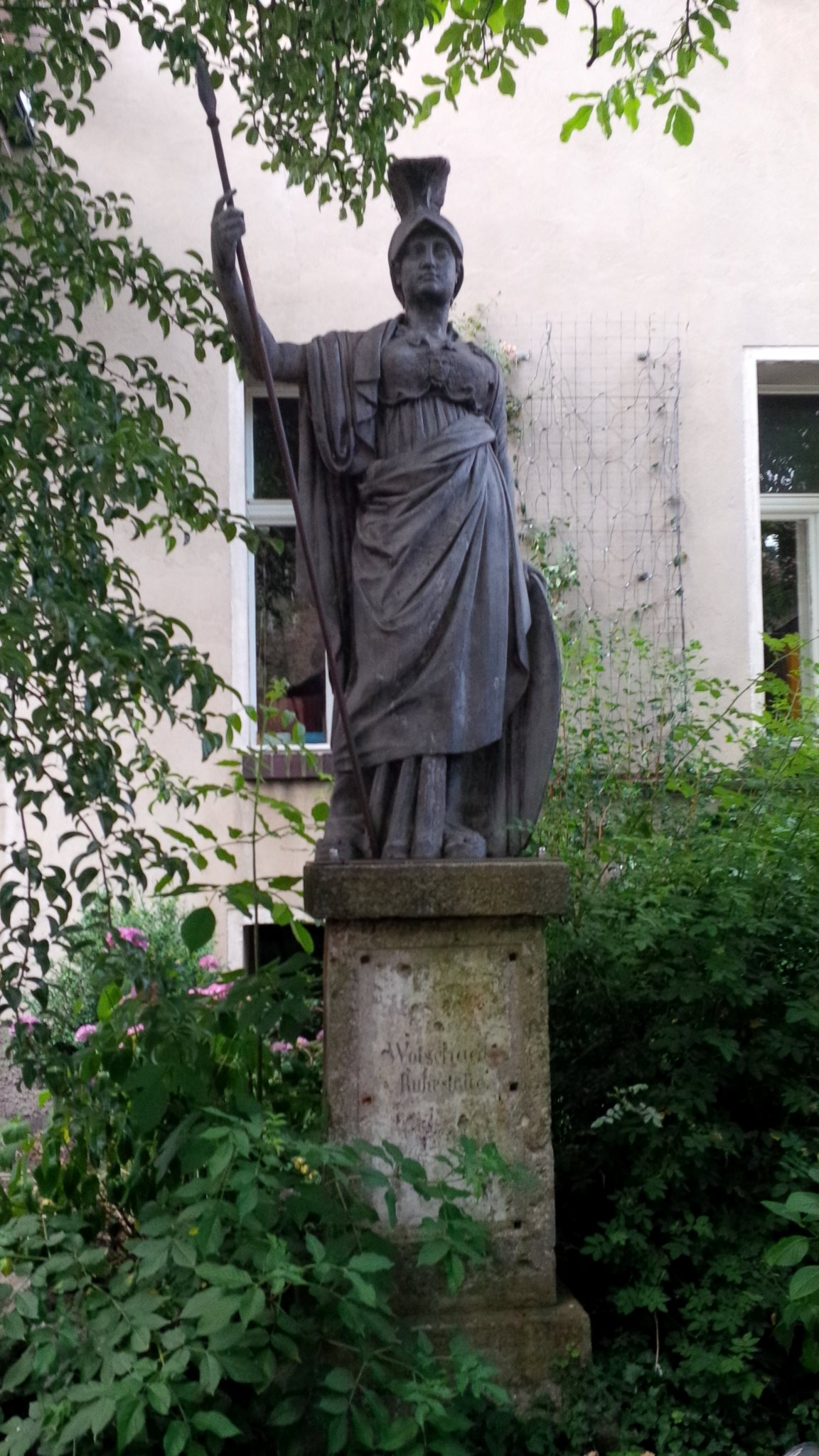
Statue of Minerva by Joseph Kirchmayer

== Historical printing house J. E. v. Seidel ==
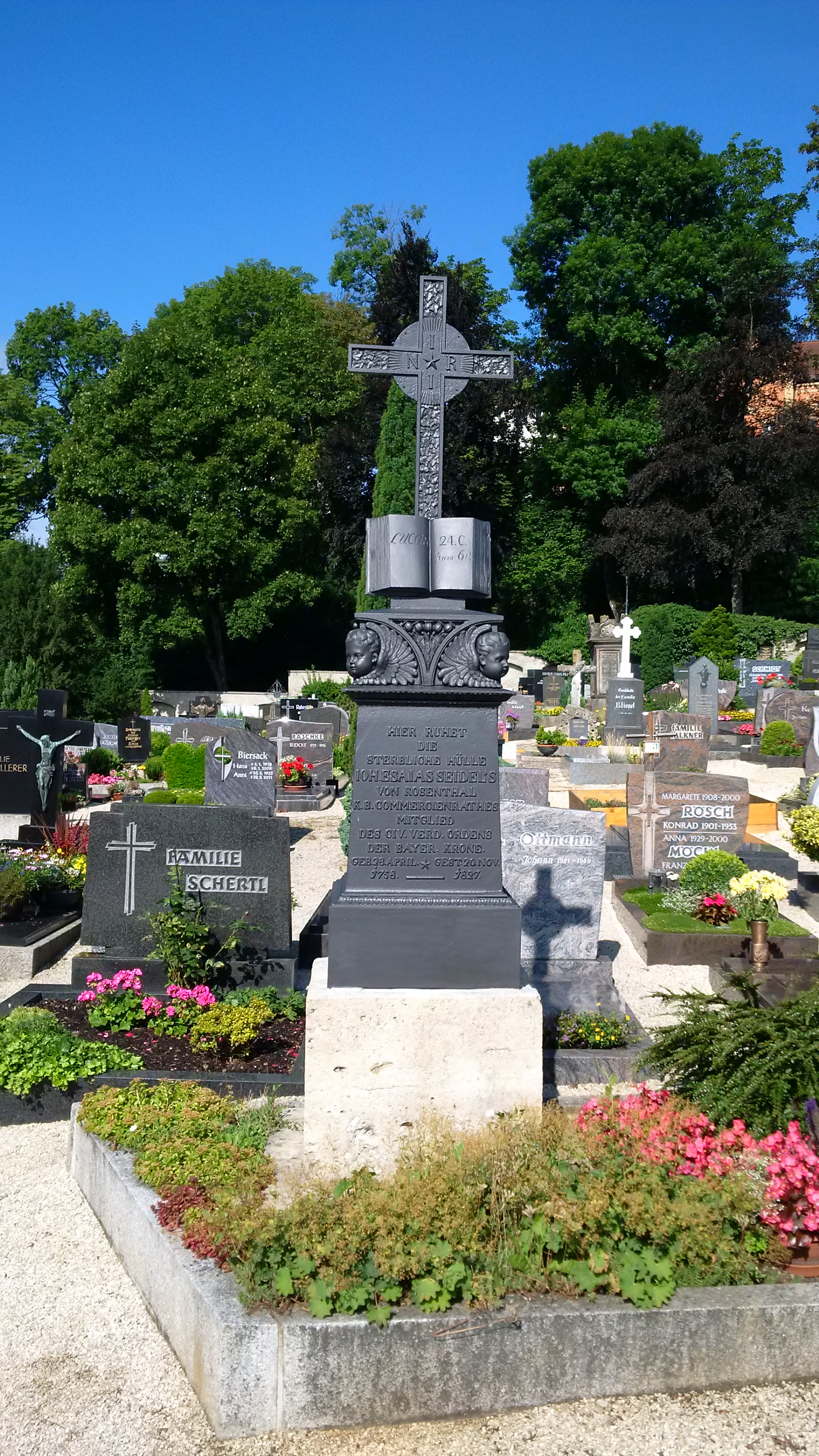
Tomb of Johann Esaias von Seidel in the town cemetery of Sulzbach-Rosenberg after renovation

After Seidel's death in 1827, his sons initially succeeded him, then sold in 1854 to Friedrich Pustet from Regensburg. Pustet sold the castle in 1862 and moved into smaller rooms on Sulzbach's Luitpoldplatz. In 1877, Pustet handed over the company to Dietrich Wotschack, who had already been an authorised signatory of the company since 1848. His great-grandson Ingo Wotschack continued to run the "J. E. v. Seidel'sche Buchhandlung" in Sulzbach-Rosenberg (after the printing business ceased in 1976) until his death in 2006.

As late as 2006, an intensive academic inventory and investigation of the extensive, nationally significant estate began, which includes the publisher's archive and the publisher's library from the 17th to the 20th century. The first results were published in 2008. The discovery of the picture story "Der Kuchenteig" by Wilhelm Busch was considered a "sensational find", which represents a previously unknown preliminary study for Max und Moritz. This was published in 2010 by Suhrkamp Verlag in the series Insel-Bücherei as IB 1325. The further indexing of the estate, in which some four and a half thousand hours of voluntary work have been invested so far, is ongoing.

The expansion of the rooms of the Seidel printing house into an exhibition centre and event hall started in 2010 and completed in April 2011 with a ceremonial opening as the Seidel Hall. Funding was provided by LEADER programme funds, donations and voluntary contributions from the townspeople. In the meantime, the Seidel Hall has established itself as a venue for events in addition to those organised by the Friends, especially for events organised by the Kulturwerkstatt Sulzbach-Rosenberg.

A tangent piano in its original condition was discovered in the estate. It was presented to the public in 2012 after extensive restoration during a concert.

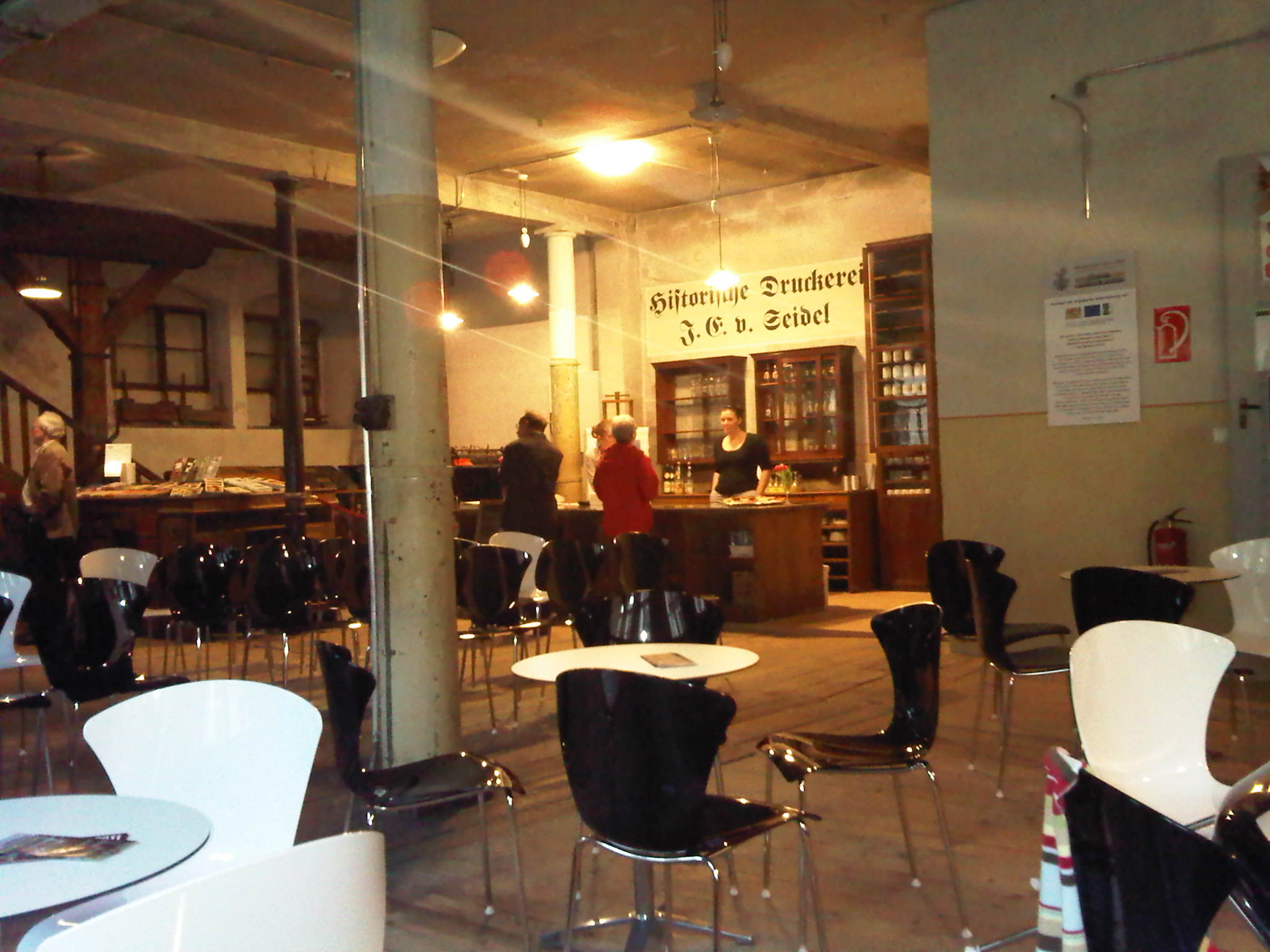
The renovated "Seidel Hall" in the historic print shop
