= Keyboard instrument =

Musical instrument played using a keyboard

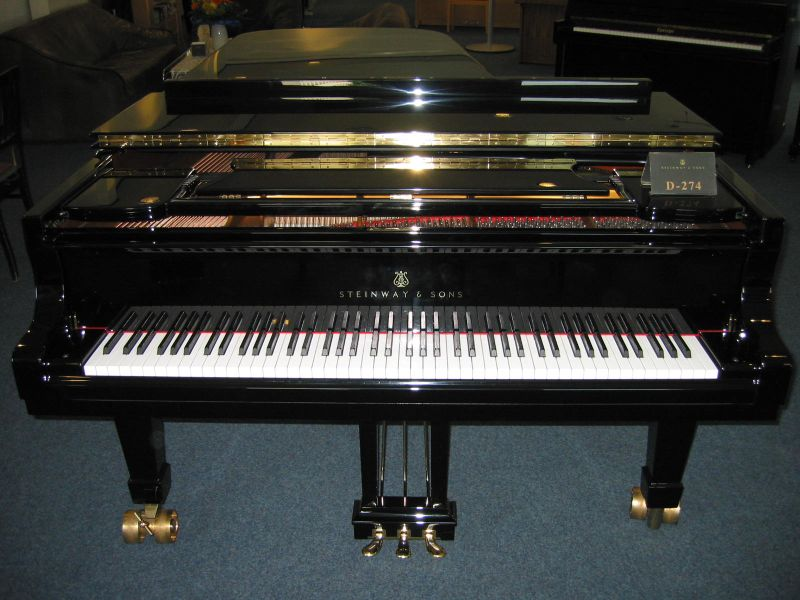
The piano, a common keyboard instrument

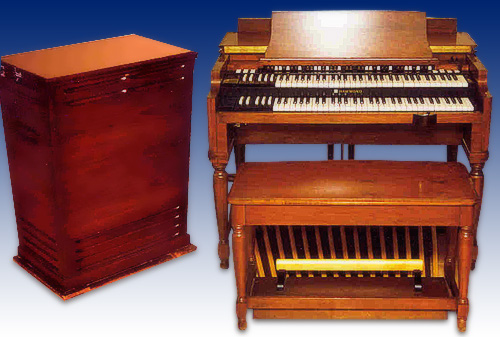
Hammond organ with part of a Leslie speaker shown

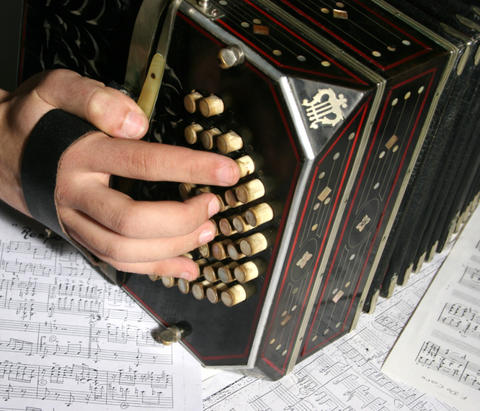
Bandoneon

A keyboard instrument is a musical instrument played using a keyboard, a row of levers that are pressed by the fingers. The most common of these are the piano, organ, and various electronic keyboards, including synthesizers and digital pianos. Other keyboard instruments include celestas, which are struck idiophones operated by a keyboard, and carillons, which are usually housed in bell towers or belfries of churches or municipal buildings.

Today, the term keyboard often refers to keyboard-style synthesizers and arrangers as well as work-stations. These keyboards typically work by translating the physical act of pressing keys into electrical signals that produce sound. Under the fingers of a sensitive performer, the keyboard may also be used to control dynamics, phrasing, shading, articulation, and other elements of expression—depending on the design and inherent capabilities of the instrument. Modern keyboards, especially digital ones, can simulate a wide range of sounds beyond traditional piano tones, thanks to advanced sound synthesis techniques and digital sampling technology.

Another important use of the word keyboard is in historical musicology, where it means an instrument whose identity cannot be firmly established. Particularly in the 18th century, the harpsichord, the clavichord, and the early piano competed, and the same piece might be played on more than one. Hence, in a phrase such as "Mozart excelled as a keyboard player", the word keyboard is typically all-inclusive.

The term keyboard classifies instruments based on how the performer plays the instrument, and not on how the sound is produced. Categories of keyboard instruments include the following families (of which this is only a partial list):

- aerophones (pipe organ, pump organ, accordion);
- idiophones (celesta, carillon, glasschord);
- chordophones:
  - plucked string instruments (harpsichord, tangent piano, lautenwerck);
  - bowed string instruments (hurdy-gurdy, bowed clavier);
  - struck string instruments (clavichord, piano);
- electrophones (electric pianos, electric and electronic organs, synthesizers, mellotron).

== History ==
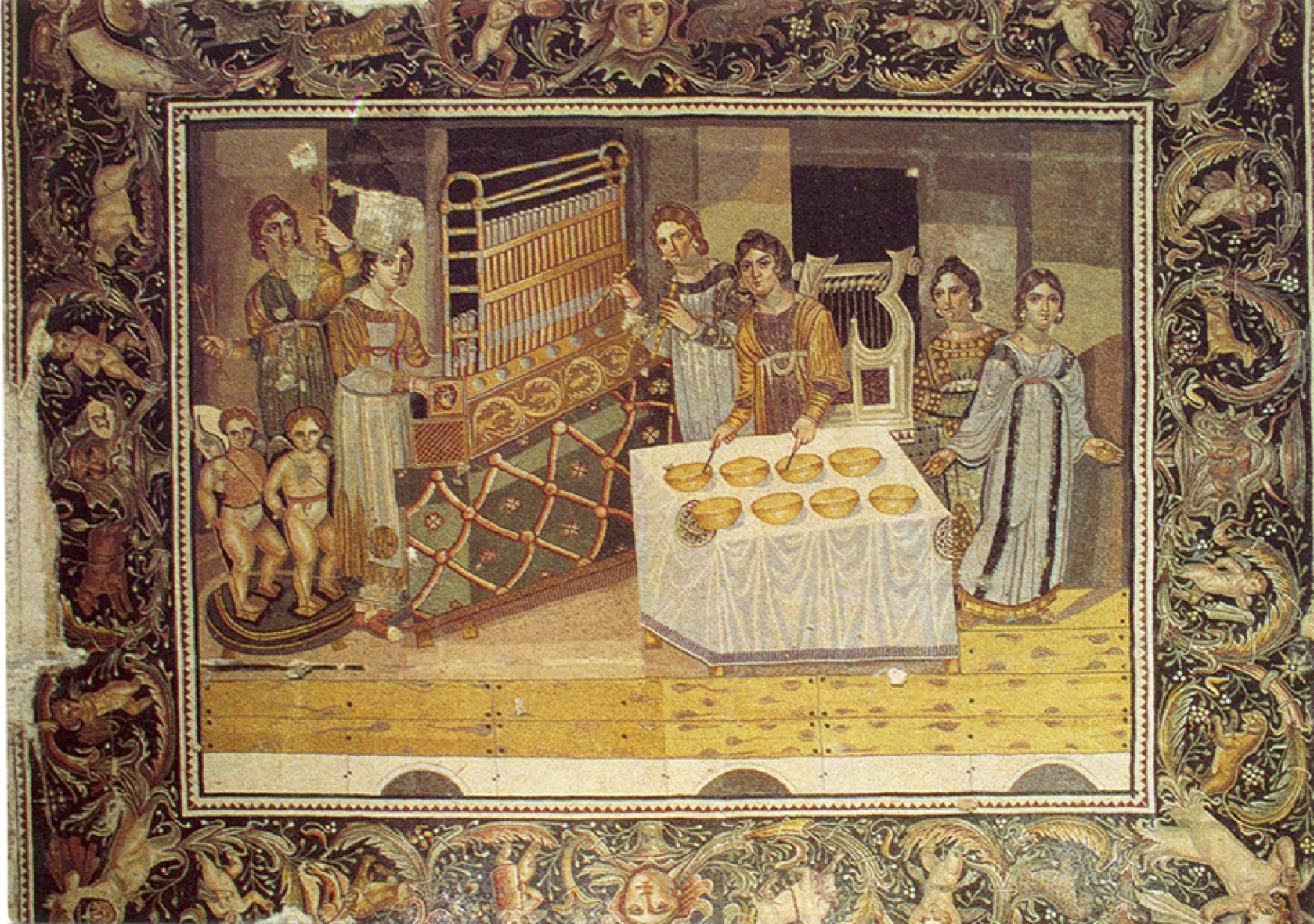
Late 4th century AD "Mosaic of the Female Musicians" from a Byzantine villa in Maryamin, Syria.

The earliest known keyboard instrument was the Ancient Greek hydraulis, a type of pipe organ invented in the third century BC. The keys were likely balanced and could be played with a light touch, as is clear from the reference in a Latin poem by Claudian (late 4th century), who says magna levi detrudens murmura tactu . . . intonet, that is "let him thunder forth as he presses out mighty roarings with a light touch" (Paneg. Manlio Theodoro, 320–22). From its invention until the fourteenth century, the organ remained the only keyboard instrument. Often, the organ did not feature a keyboard at all, but rather buttons or large levers operated by a whole hand. Almost every keyboard until the fifteenth century had seven naturals to each octave.

The clavicymbalum, clavichord, and the harpsichord appeared during the fourteenth century—the clavichord probably being earlier. The harpsichord and clavichord were both common until the widespread adoption of the piano in the eighteenth century, after which their popularity decreased. The first template for the modern piano was introduced in 1698 in Italy by Bartolomeo Cristofori as the gravicèmbalo con piano e forte ("harpsichord with soft and loud"), also shortened to pianoforte, as it allowed the pianist to control the dynamics by adjusting the force with which each key was struck. In its current form, the piano is a product of further developments made since the late nineteenth century and is distinct in both sound and appearance from the instruments known to earlier pianists, including Mozart, Haydn, and Beethoven. Beginning in the twentieth century, early electromechanical instruments, such as the Ondes Martenot, began to appear as well. Later in the 20th century, electronic keyboards appeared.

== See also ==
- Enharmonic keyboard
- Hammered dulcimer
- Keyboard percussion
- Musical keyboard
- Orchestrina di camera
- List of keyboard instruments
