= Joel Cohen (musician) =

American musician (1942–2026)

- Born: May 29, 1942
- Died: July 26, 2026 (aged 84) Haverhill, Massachusetts, U.S.
- Genres: Early music, Classical
- Occupations: Musician, music producer, musical director
- Instruments: Lute
- Formerly of: Boston Camerata

Joel Cohen (May 29, 1942 – July 26, 2026) was an American musician who specialized in early music. Cohen was involved with the Boston Camerata, an American early music ensemble. Cohen studied at Harvard University and furthered his training in Europe, particularly in France, where he also worked with national public radio on early music projects.

== Life and career ==
Cohen was the music director of the Boston Camerata from 1968 to 2008, and music director emeritus from 2008 until his death. He founded the Camerata Mediterranea ensemble in 1990. He has collaborated with French-born soprano Anne Azéma. From 1992 onward, Cohen and the Boston Camerata collaborated with the Shaker community at Sabbathday Lake (in the US); together they recorded two albums — Simple Gifts and The Golden Harvest — of Shaker songs. Cohen produced recordings themed around historical, cultural, or religious concepts, such as A Mediterranean Christmas, Carmina Burana, and The American Vocalist. He recorded over 50 albums on the Erato, Nonesuch, and Harmonia Mundi labels.

Cohen died in Haverhill, Massachusetts, on July 26, 2026, at the age of 84.

== Vision and approach ==
Cohen often blended music with storytelling, exploring the social and cultural context of the works that he presented. He had an interest in cross-cultural musical traditions, frequently exploring intersections between Western early music, Jewish, Islamic, and other world traditions. He also wrote essays and program notes on the interpretation of early music, and he promoted historically-informed performances in the United States.

== Discography (selected) ==
- Jewish Baroque Music. Harmonia Mundi, 1978.
- Sing We Noel: Christmas Music from England and Early America. Nonesuch Records, 1978.
- Henry Purcell, Dido and Aeneas. Harmonia Mundi, 1980.
- Tristan and Iseult. Erato, 1987.
- Jean Gilles, Requiem. Erato, 1990.
- The Sacred Bridge. Jews and Christians in Medieval Europe. Erato, 1990.
- Le Roman de Fauvel. Erato, 1990.
- A Baroque Christmas. Erato Nonesuch, 1992.
- Carmina Burana: Medieval Songs. Erato, 1996.
- Liberty Tree: Early American Music, 1776–1861. Warner Classics, 1998.
- What Then is Love? An Elizabethan Songbook. Erato, 1998.
- A Boston Camerata Christmas: Worlds of Medieval Christmas Music. Warner Classics, 2008.
- Le Voir-Dit. Erato, 2009.
