= Heinz Tetzner =

German artist (1920–2007)

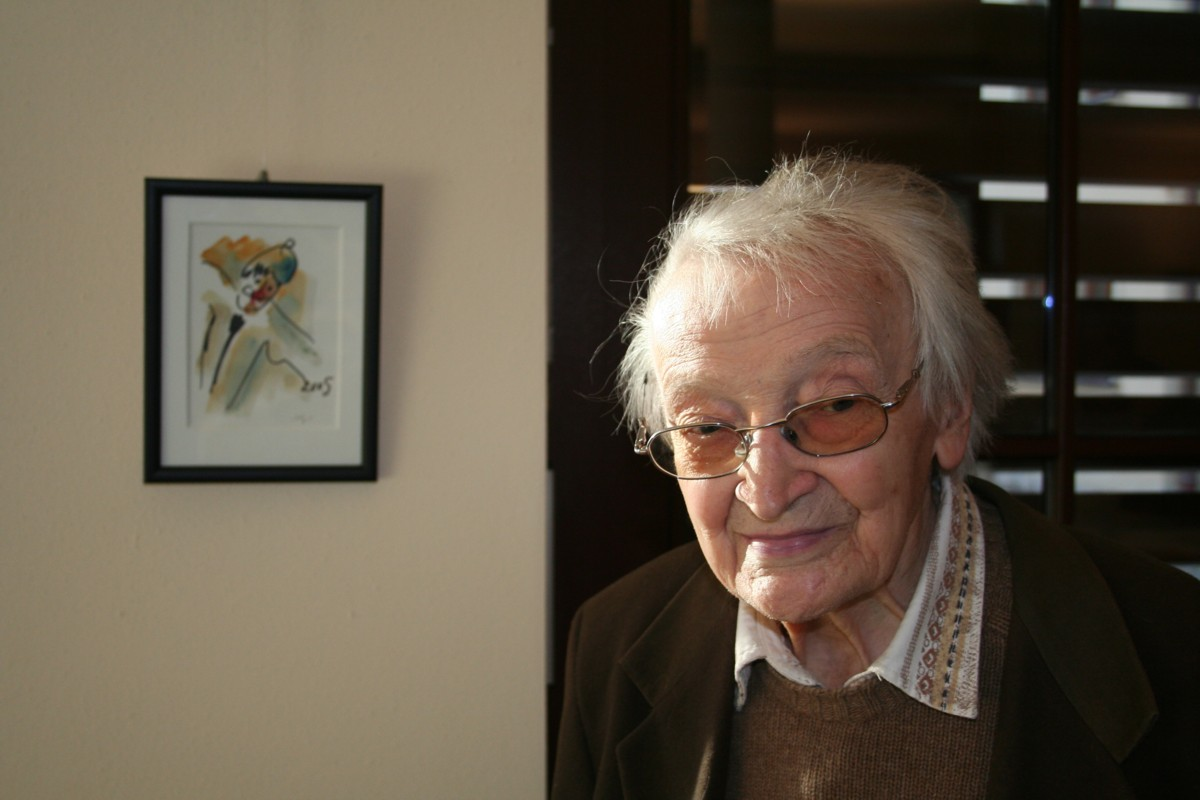
- Born: 8 March 1920; Gersdorf, Germany
- Died: 20 August 2007 (aged 87); Gersdorf, Germany
- Movement: Expressionism
- Website: www.heinz-tetzner.de

Heinz Tetzner (8 March 1920 – 20 August 2007) was a German expressionist painter and printmaker. Tetzner was born in Gersdorf (Saxony). He died in Gersdorf 2007.
