= Narcisse Chaillou =

French painter (1835–1916)

Narcisse Chaillou (12 March 1835 – 1916) was a French painter famous for his genre scenes of Paris and Brittany life.

He moved to Paris in 1870 and became the student of Léon Bonnat (1833–1922), Ernest Hébert (1817–1908) et Jean-Baptiste-Camille Corot (1796–1875). He exhibited his works in many French Salons, among them the Salon de Paris and the Salon des artistes français. He moved to Brittany in 1880. The artworks of Narcisse Chaillou belong to the public collections and museums in the cities of Rennes, Nantes, Morlaix and Vitré.

The painter died in Guémémé-sur-Scorff (Brittany) in 1916.
