= Les Passions =

- Baroque orchestra
- Former name: Baroque Orchestra of Montauban
- Founded: 1986
- Location: Montauban
- Website: www.les-passions.fr/en/baroque-orchestra/

Les Passions is a Baroque orchestra. Created in 1986 by the recorder player Jean-Marc Andrieu, the orchestra is in residence in the south-west French town of Montauban. This ensemble specialises in the practice of period instruments. Its artistic approach reconciles two principles: a respect for the musical technique of the period (authentic performance) and a dynamic interpretation of the musical composition. Its vocation is to convince the public that ancient music is as relevant to the present as are the writings of Molière, the paintings of La Tour or the architecture of Mansart.

Its repertoire extends from the beginning of the 17th century (Monteverdi’s Vêpres à la Vierge) to the end of the 18th century (Mozart's Requiem) encompassing a large number of the masters of the Baroque era (Bach, Handel, Telemann, Scarlatti, Vivaldi, Purcell, Charpentier...). The orchestra is also dedicated to rediscovering the legacy of French music by producing the opera Stratonice by Méhul, Daphnis et Alcimadure by Mondonville, and works by Toulouse composers Dupuy, Levens, and Jean Gilles. The orchestra also contributes to the restitution of the musical library of the Dukes of Aiguillon.

Formerly the Baroque Orchestra of Montauban, at the end of 2003 Jean-Marc Andrieu renamed the orchestra Les Passions in reference to a musical form and to the philosophical and literary subject very much discussed in the 17th and 18th centuries that influenced lyrical composers during the Baroque and Classical periods.

The intention of Music is not only to please the Ear, but express Sentiments, strike the Imagination, affect the Mind, and command the Passions.

— Francesco Geminiani, The Art of Playing on the Violin, 1751

== Residence and support ==
Les Passions currently resides at the Conservatory of Music of Montauban, France. The orchestra receives support from the city of Montauban, the Midi-Pyrénées Region, and the city of Toulouse. It is also registered with the Ministry of Culture and Communication. The orchestra is recorded and distributed by Ligia Digital and Harmonia Mundi.

== Discography ==
- Cantem Nadal – Noël Baroque Occitan, 2009
- Requiem. Jean Gilles, 2008
- Vêpres Vénitiennes. Porpora, Vivaldi, 2007
- Con voce Festiva. Scarlatti, 2005
- La Passion selon Saint-Matthieu. J. S. Bach, 2000
- Leclair, Telemann, Vivaldi, Purcell, 1993
- Disque Te Deum de Levens, 2008
