= Guillaume Poitevin =

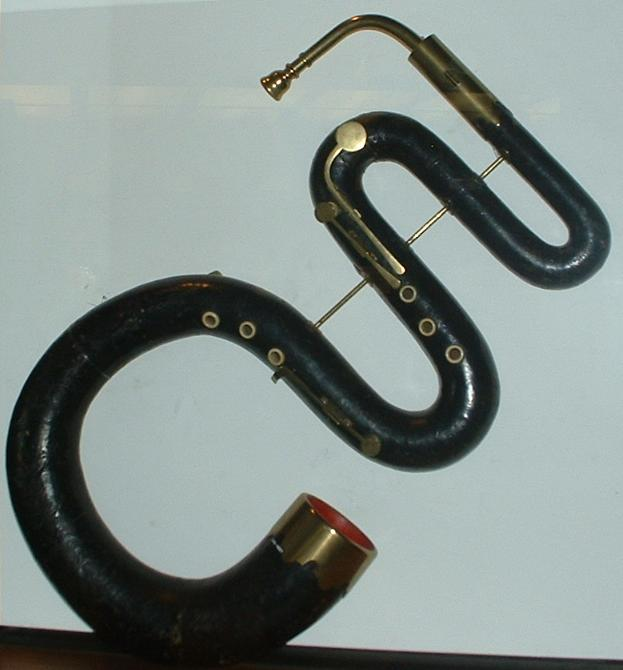
Serpent (V&A museum, London)

Guillaume Poitevin (2 October 1646 – 26 January 1706) was a French Roman Catholic priest, church vocalist, serpent player, conductor, music educator, and composer. He was trained as a singer in his youth at the Church of St. Trophime, Arles in his native city where he worked as a boy soprano. His gifts as serpent player earned him a position at the Aix Cathedral in 1663. He remained at the Aix Cathedral until his death nearly forty years later. There he became an ordained priest in 1672, and served in a variety of roles both musical and non-musical. He is best remembered for being an outstanding music teacher and director of the cathedral's choir through his role as maître de chapelle; a post he held intermittently from 1667 until his sudden death in 1706 at the age of 59.

== Biography ==
Born in Boulbon near Arles, Guillaume Poitevin was to son Roc Poitevin, a merchant who owned a butcher shop. He was trained as a boy soprano in the choir of Church of St. Trophime, Arles. He was singing at that church when Louis XIV visited Arles in 1660.

Poitevin was also a wind instrument player who was gifted at playing the serpent, an early instrument in the brass family. His skills on this instrument earned his a position at the Aix Cathedral where he began working on November 17, 1663. He devoted himself to religious life, receiving the tonsure on March 8, 1665. He was ordained as a priest on April 2, 1672 and was made a prebendary at the Aix Cathedral on May 14, 1677.

Poitevin worked as the maître de chapelle of the Aix Cathedral intermittently during his years of service at that church. He was a gifted teacher, and many of his pupil's in cathedral's choir went on to successful careers as musicians. He was first appointed to the post of maître de chapelle on April 23, 1667 and remained in that role until July 1680 when he requested reassignment. After nearly five years of absence from that post, he returned the role in January 1685 and continued to serve in that capacity until May 1693 when he reached his thirty year service mark and the regulations of the church mandated he must retire. His pupil Jean Gilles succeeded him at this time. Gilles was in turn succeeded by another of Poitevan's pupils, Jacques Cabassole.

Poitevin returned to the post of maître de chapelle for a third time in that role in May 1698 at the request of. This time, he remained the maître de chapelle until his sudden death at the Aix Cathedral on January 26, 1706 at the age of 59. Other musicians who were trained by him included André Campra, François Estienne, Claude Mathieu Pelegrin, Laurent Belissen, and Antoine Blanchard.

== Discography ==
The Baroque ensemble Les Festes d'Orphée recorded the totality of the work known to date a priori (three incomplete masses out of the four, the third being lost):

- I : "Ave Maria": "Les Maîtres Baroques de Provence / Vol. I" - 1996 - Parnassie éditions]
- II : "Speciosa facta es" et IV : "Dominus tecum": "Les Maîtres Baroques de Provence / Vol. II" - 1999 - Parnassie éditions
