= Henri Arnaut de Zwolle =

Henri Arnaut de Zwolle (c. 1400, in Zwolle – September 6, 1466, in Paris) (often Henri Arnault, also Henricus Arnold/Arnoldus/Arnoul of/van Zwolle) was employed as a physician, astronomer, astrologer, and organist to Philip the Good. He is best known for a treatise on musical instruments.

Henri Arnaut apparently was born in Zwolle, then part of the Burgundian Netherlands. There are no data on his education. Perhaps he became a physician first, as he was named Magister Henricus Arnault, Medicus Alemannus de Zuvolis (Zuvolis = Zwolle). He became a student of the instrument-maker Jean de Fusoris, who was employed between 1400 and 1445 by Philip the Good and later by the French king Louis XI. By 1432, Henri was at the court of Philip the Good in Dijon as well.

Between 1438 and 1446 (several decades before the activities of Leonardo da Vinci), he created manuscripts in Latin on a wide variety of technical subjects, including astronomy, hydraulics, astronomical instruments, and drawings of apparent inventions like a folding ladder and a gem polishing machine. Among the manuscripts is a copy (in Henri's handwriting) of Jacob of Liège's Speculum musicae. The best known part is his treatise on the design and construction of musical instruments, containing, amongst others, the earliest illustration of a harpsichord. He gave a detailed description of the action and the operation of this keyboard plucked instrument with the complex linkages between the keyboard and the strings. He also described the lute, the clavichord, the dulce melos, and the organ. His description of the organ is more practical than earlier treatises, describing the composition of the diapason chorus and the scaling of the pipes. He describes the layout of pipes, either with the longest in the middle, "in the form of a bishop's mitre", or in chromatic order, longest at the left, and he is credited with the first mention of reed pipes. All instruments in his manuscript were to be played at the court and not in churches. The manuscripts were probably only bundled in the 16th century (F-Pn Lat. 7295).

As councilor to Philip the Good, he produced a map in 1444 of the region contested between France and Burgundy, in order to define French enclaves that could be eliminated to simplify the border.

Between 1454 and 1461 he left the Burgundian court to work for the French kings Charles VII and Louis XI in Paris, where he died of the plague in 1466.

His clavichord has a compass of three octaves B–b^{2}. A separate diagram is included showing the fretting: in this, 34 tangents are shown acting on nine courses of strings, disposed in threes and fours except that the top course has as many as five tangents. However, since the compass of the clavichord requires 37 notes, this is three tangents too few and there must be some kind of error. Most commentators have accepted the solution proposed by Ripin, which is to provide ten courses, with the fretting disposed as follows:

B-c-c#-d|e♭-e-f-f#|g-g#-a|b♭-b-c^{1}-c#^{1}|d^{1}-e♭^{1}-e^{1}|f^{1}-f#^{1}-g^{1}-g#^{1}|a^{1}-b♭^{1}-b^{1}|c^{2}-c#^{2}-d^{2}|e♭^{2}-e^{2}-f^{2}-f#^{2}|g^{2}-g#^{2}-a^{2}-b♭^{2}-b^{2}

Note that with the exception of the top and bottom courses, this is equivalent to "classic" multiple fretting.
