= Ernst Ludwig Gerber =

German composer, organist, cellist, and author (1746 – 1819)

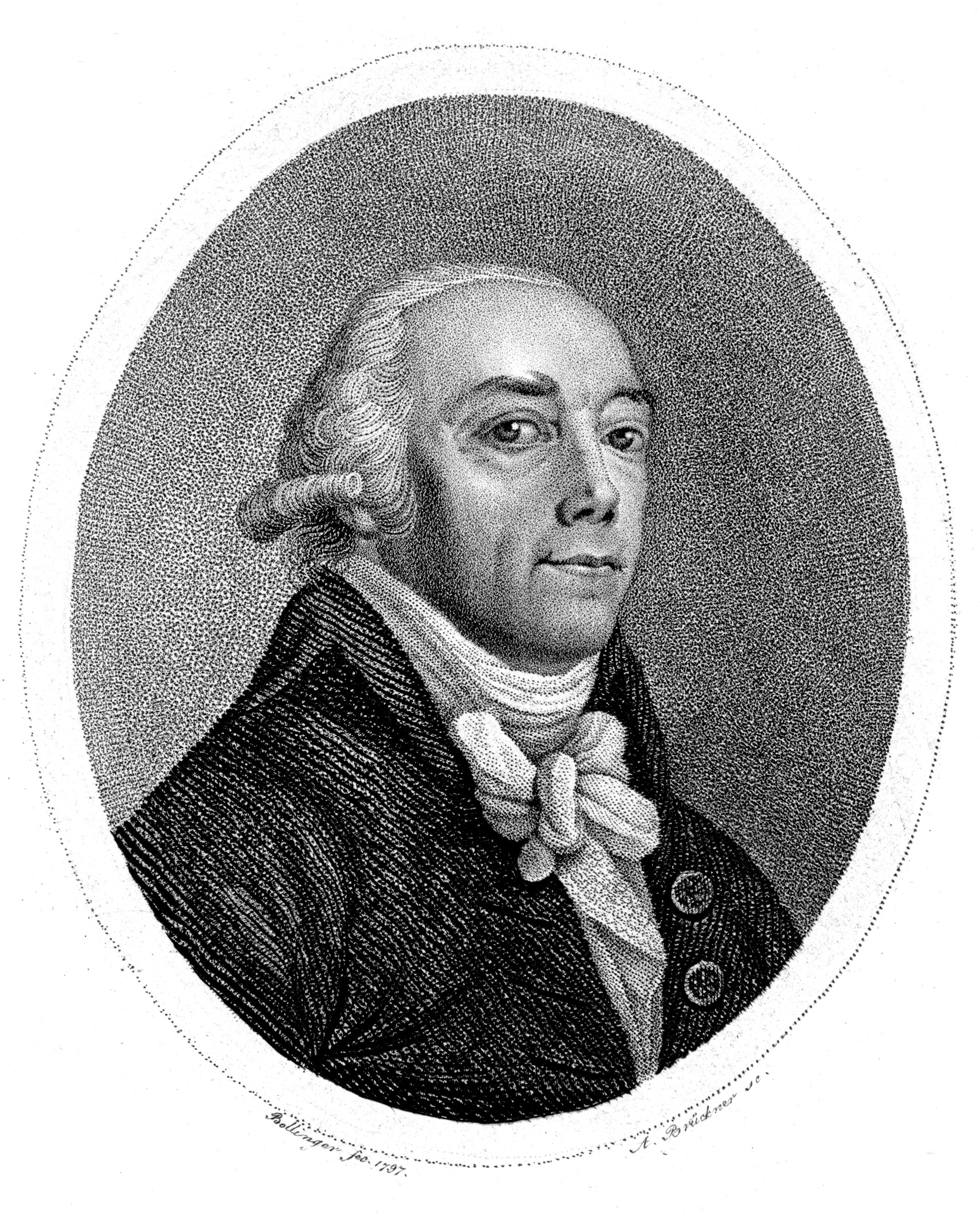
- Ernst Ludwig Gerber
- Born: 29 September 1746; Sondershausen, Germany
- Died: 30 June 1819 (aged 72)
- Occupations: composer, organist, and author

Ernst Ludwig Gerber (29 September 1746 in Sondershausen, Germany – 30 June 1819 in Sondershausen) was a German composer, organist, cellist, and author of a famous dictionary of musicians.

His father, Heinrich Nikolaus Gerber (1702–1775), a pupil of J. S. Bach, was an organist and composer of some distinction, and under his direction Ernst Ludwig at an early age had made great progress in his musical studies. In 1765 he went to Leipzig to study law, but the claims of music, which had gained additional strength from his acquaintanceship with Johann Adam Hiller (of whom Gerber became the cellist of his orchestra Großes Concert Concert), soon came to occupy almost his sole attention. On his return to Sondershausen he was appointed music teacher to the children of the prince, and in 1775 he succeeded his father as court organist.

Afterwards he devoted much of his time to the study of the literature and history of music, and with this view he made himself master of several modern languages. His Historisch-biographisches Lexikon der Tonkünstler appeared in 1790 and 1792 in two volumes; and the first volume of what was virtually an improved and corrected edition of this work was published in 1810 under the title Neues Historisch-biographisches Lexikon der Tonkünstler, followed by three further volumes in 1812, 1813 and 1814. Gerber also contributed a number of papers to musical periodicals, and published several minor musical compositions.

Gerber, as it has been cited, owned a manuscript from a member of Bach family, which contained the settings of more than 200 chorale melodies.
