= Christoph Friedrich Schmahl =

German musical instrument maker

Christoph Friedrich Schmahl (c. 1739 – 15 May 1814) was a German musical instrument maker.

== Life ==
Schmahl came from a family of organ builders. He was born in Heilbronn to Johann Adam Schmahl (1704–1757), an organ builder from the city. By 1770, he had been working in Regensburg.

In 1772, he married Anna Felicitas Späth, the second daughter of Franz Jakob Späth. Späth was looking for a journeyman who could inherit his business. In 1774, he partnered with Späth to found a piano-building firm. After Späth's death in 1786, he continued to manufacture and sign pianos under his and Späth's name until 1793, when he started to sign only his name. After he retired in 1812, his son, Christian Carl (1782–1815), took over the firm.

Schmahl died on 15 May 1814 in Regensburg. A year after, Christian Carl died and the firm was dissolved.
