= Boston Camerata =

Music ensemble

The Boston Camerata is an early music ensemble based in Boston, Massachusetts. It was founded in 1954 by Narcissa Williamson, at the Museum of Fine Arts, Boston, as an adjunct to that museum's musical instrument collection.

The Camerata incorporated as an independent nonprofit in 1974. It was directed from 1969 to 2008 by Joel Cohen, who remains Music Director Emeritus. Since 2008, the company's artistic director has been French-born singer and scholar Anne Azéma. Azéma has produced several new programs with the Camerata, featuring repertoire that spans eight centuries of music. The Camerata has a regular subscription series for Boston-area residents, as well as tours in the United States and abroad.

From 1992 onwards the Boston Camerata and Joel Cohen collaborated with the still-functioning community at Sabbathday Lake (USA) and recorded together two albums (Simple Gifts and The Golden Harvest) of Shaker songs.

In 2011, Camerata was in residence in Reims, France, contributing five programs of medieval French music to the 800th anniversary celebration of the Reims Cathedral. Recently, the ensemble has appeared in Paris at the Palais de Chaillot in collaboration with the Tero Saarinen Company of Helsinki, Finland (2014), at the Théatre de Ville during its 60th anniversary season (2015), and at La Philharmonie de Paris (2018). The Night's Tale, Azéma's innovative staged production built around a medieval tournament in France, was first presented in France and Luxembourg in 2007. It has since been performed in Boston to great acclaim in Spring 2016 and will tour in the US in 2020. The company's South American début tour took place in Brazil in July, 2016.

In 2017 and 2018, the Camerata toured in Switzerland, Holland, and France and Canada and the US Midwest, including a reprise of the Play of Daniel, first presented to Boston audiences in late 2014.

The Camerata's recordings include programs on Harmonia Mundi, Erato, Telefunken, and Warner Classics. Among the ensemble's awards are the Grand Prix du Disque (1987), awarded for a medieval version of the Tristan and Iseult legend. Other media projects include two prizes at FIFA Montréal, 2014. It has undertaken museum and educational projects including a visiting artist residency at the Massachusetts Institute of Technology, Art Gallery of Ontario, Toronto, and The Metropolitan Museum Cloisters Concerts. It has collaborated with local choirs, both children and adults.
