= Henry Madin =

French composer

Henry Madin (7 October 1698 – 3 February 1748) was a French composer at the Chapelle royale and music theorist.

== Biography ==
Madin was born in Verdun, Three Bishoprics of a French mother and an Irish father born in Galway who had left Ireland in the early 1690s with the Wild Geese. His first music studies took place in Verdun, among the children singing in the cathedral school. After having directed church choirs at the cathedrals of Meaux, Verdun, Tours, and Rouen), Madin moved to Versailles in 1736, where he was first active for the King's service, relieving the duties of Charles-Hubert Gervais and André Campra. In 1738, after having ensured membership in the royal chapel, he became "Sous-maître de la Musique de la Chapelle du Roi" – the highest position for a musician at the French court – alongside Esprit Antoine Blanchard. From 1742, protected by Louis XV, Madin was appointed Governor of the Pages. He died in Versailles aged 49.

In 1742 Madin published a treatise on counterpoint, Traité de contrepoint simple, which was inspired by Louis-Joseph Marchand's earlier 1739 publication Traité du contrepoint simple, ou Chant sur le livre.

== Editions ==
- Henry Madin, Les Messes. Edited by Jean-Paul C. Montagnier (Versailles: Centre de musique baroque de Versailles, 2003).
- Henry Madin, Te Deum. Edited by Jean-Paul C. Montagnier (La Petite-Raon, Nancy: Entreprise & culture en Lorraine, 2017).

== Recordings ==
- Henry Madin: Masses, Motets; Ensemble Almasis, directed by Iakovos Pappas, on Arion ARN 68432 (CD, 1998).
- Henry Madin: Les Petits motets; Ensemble Le Concert Lorrain, directed by Anne-Catherine Bucher, on K617 K617184 (CD, 2008).
- Henry Madin: Te Deum pour les victoires de Louis XV; Ensemble Stradivaria, Les Cris de Paris, directed by Daniel Cuiller, on Alpha-Classics ALPHA 963 (CD, 2016).

== Bibliography ==
- Jean-Paul C. Montagnier: Henry Madin (1698–1748). Un musicien Lorrain au service de Louis XV (Langres: Éditions Dominique Guéniot, 2008).
- Jean-Paul C. Montagnier: "De Galway à Verdun: les origines irlandaises du compositeur Henry Madin", in: Le Pays lorrain, vol. 108 no. 92 (December 2011), p. 375–377.
- Jean-Paul C. Montagnier: The Polyphonic Mass in France, 1600–1780: The Evidence of the Printed Choirbooks (Cambridge: Cambridge University Press, 2017).
- Jean-Paul C. Montagnier, "The War of the Austrian Succession and the Masses by Henry Madin (1741-1748)", in: Music & Letters, 100 (August 2019), pp. 391–419.
