= Antoine de Longueval =

French composer

Antoine de Longueval (fl. 1498–1525) was a French singer and composer of the Renaissance. A contemporary of Josquin des Prez, he was singing master of the French royal chapel under King Francis I, and was important in the history of the polyphonic setting of the Passion.

== Life ==
Little is known about his early life, not even his approximate birthdate, but he was probably from the village of Longueval in the Somme region of Picardy (scene of much heavy fighting during the Somme battles in 1916). By 1498, court records indicate that he was employed by Anne of Brittany, and between 1502 and 1504 he was a singer at the Savoy court, where his high pay indicates the respect he was accorded as a musician. From there he went to Ferrara, where he was a singer between December 1503 and September 1504; therefore he was there at the same time as Josquin des Prez. It is presumed that he wrote his most famous composition, the passion setting Passio Domini nostri for Holy Week of 1504, the same event for which Josquin's famous Miserere was likely written.

Why he left Ferrara is not known, but he may have fled an outbreak of the plague, as did Josquin and a large proportion of the town's population. In 1507 he is listed as a member of the group of private musicians of the French king, Louis XII, and in 1515, Francis I promoted him to maître de chapelle (singing master) of the royal chapel. That same year he went to Italy with the French king, along with composer Jean Mouton, where Pope Leo X made both composers apostolic notaries. On returning to France, Longueval was further honored by being made a canon of Notre Dame de Paris, a position he resigned in 1519 in order to become abbot of the Benedictine priory in Longueval, the probable town of his birth. Alfonso I, the Duke of Ferrara, made one more attempt to get him to return to his opulent musical establishment in Italy, but evidently was not successful. The last mention of Longueval is at the French court in 1525, and it is presumed he may have died shortly after.

His colleague at the chapelle royale, Pierre Moulu, pays tribute to Longueval in his "musicians' motet" Mater floreat (from a manuscript presented to Lorenzo II de’ Medici at his wedding in 1518) which after paying tribute to the leading composers of Europe, from Du Fay, Regis, Busnois, Basiron, Alexander Agricola, Jacob Obrecht, and Josquin, turns to Louis XII's own composers giving first and longest place to Longueval.

== Works ==
Longueval's surviving attributed works consist of two motets, two chansons, and attribution of the famous Passion setting Passio Domini nostri Jesu Christi for four voices. He wrote at least one mass setting, which was documented as being sent to Ferrara, but it either has not survived or has survived anonymously.

Passio Domini nostri is unusual for being a polyphonic setting of much of the Passion text from the Gospel of St. Matthew and the other three Gospels, especially that of St. John, with variation in texture, rhythmic character, scoring, and other musical attributes depending on the speaker and the context. It was enormously influential on Lutheran musicians in Germany throughout the 16th century, and was much imitated. The passion was recorded under the direction of Roger Blanchard and Pierre Poulteau in 1964. Finnish ensemble Kuninkaantien muusikot (Musicians of the King's Road) has performed the Passion as a part of its early passions cycle. The performance took place in Turku Cathedral in 2017, the year of the 500th anniversary of the Reformation.

The chansons by Longueval show both archaic characteristics, in that they partially abide by the 15th century convention of the formes fixes, but they also are progressive in their use of imitation, which may be an influence of Josquin.
