= Nicolas Bernier =

French composer

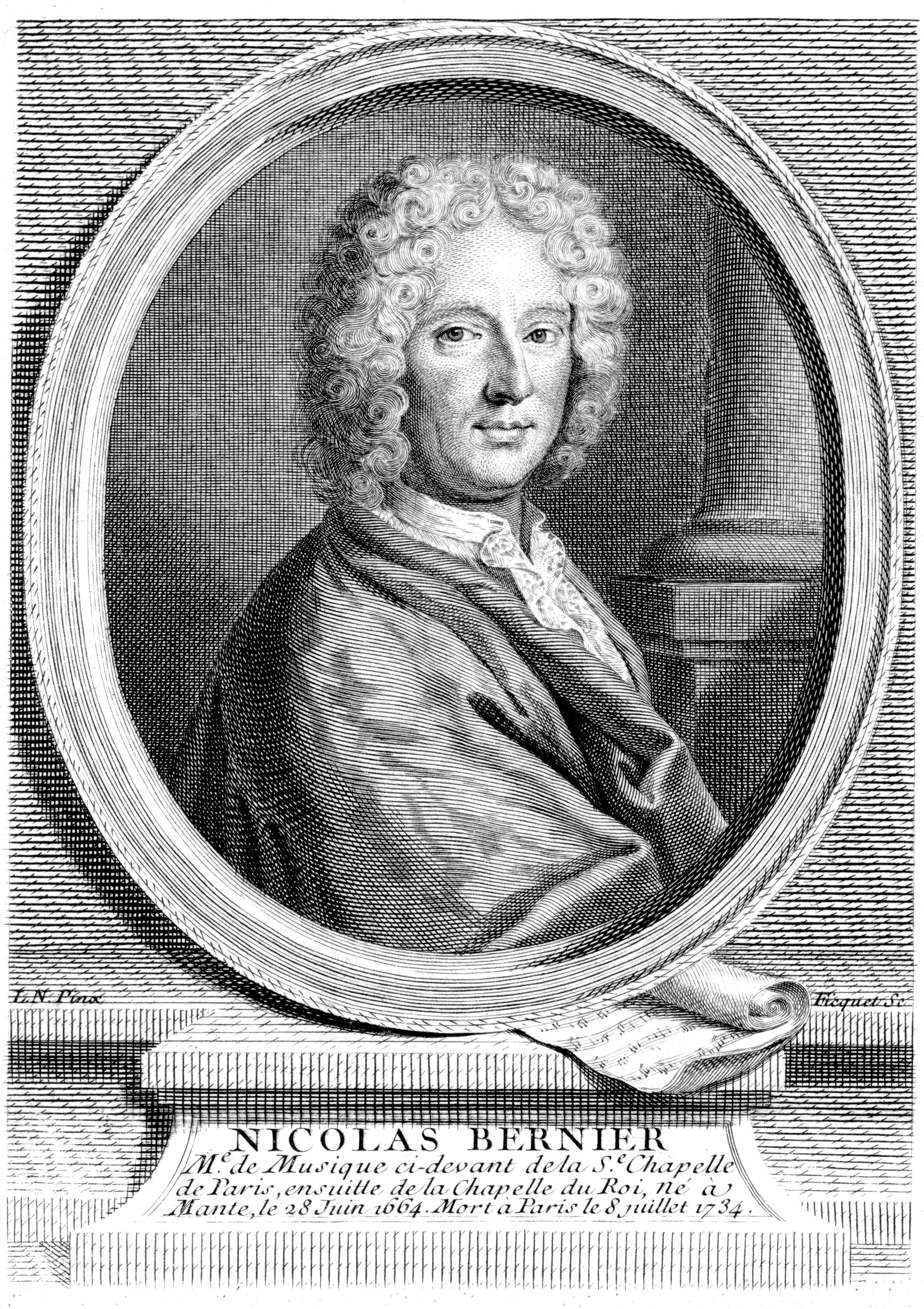
Nicolas Bernier, engraving by Étienne Ficquet

Nicolas Bernier (28 June 1664 – 5 September 1734) was a French Baroque composer.

== Biography ==
He was born in Mantes-sur-Seine (now Mantes-la-Jolie), the son of Rémy Bernier and Marguerite Bauly. He studied with Antonio Caldara and is known for an Italian-influenced style. After Marc-Antoine Charpentier he is probably the most Italian-influenced French composer of this era, and replaced Charpentier as maître de musique des enfants (master of choristers) at the royal Sainte-Chapelle in 1704. He died in Paris.

"French composer, harpsichordist, theorist and teacher. He probably learnt music in the maîtrise of the collegiate church of Notre Dame, Mantes, and in that of Evreux Cathedral. According to the Etat actuel de la Musique du Roi (1773) he then studied with Caldara in Rome. In 1692 Bernier was living in the rue Tiquetonne in Paris and was teaching the harpsichord. On 20 November 1693 he failed to win the post of maître de musique at Rouen Cathedral in competition with Jean-François Lalouette. He was appointed head of the maîtrise of Chartres Cathedral on 17 September 1694 and remained there until 18 March 1698, when he obtained a similar position at St Germain-l'Auxerrois, Paris. A Te Deum performed before the king at Fontainebleau on 24 October 1700 was very successful, and was sung again in several Parisian churches in 1701 and 1704. On 5 April 1704 he succeeded Marc-Antoine Charpentier as maître de musique of the Sainte-Chapelle, resigning from this post on 18 September 1726 in favour of his friend François de La Croix. It had taken the patronage of Philippe, Duke of Orléans, for him to keep the position after his marriage to Marie-Catherine Marais on 20 June 1712, since the rule of the Sainte-Chapelle required its maître de musique to be ‘a celibate in clerical garb’. In spite of Le Cerf de La Viéville's claim, Bernier was not an abbé, but only an acolyte entitled to wear the clerical collar. In 1715 he took part in the divertissements organized by the Duchess of Maine at her château of Sceaux. In January 1723, at the request of the regent, Michel-Richard de Lalande gave up three of his four trimestrial periods of duty as sous-maître de musique at the Chapelle Royale. The posts thus created were allotted, without being thrown open to competition, to André Campra, Charles-Hubert Gervais and Bernier, who officiated during the summer term of duty until his death. In 1726 Lalande's term became vacant when he died, and was shared between the remaining sous-maîtres, with Bernier taking charge of the education of the Chapelle pages until 1733. He was in fact famous as a teacher. He wrote a treatise entitled Principes de composition and numbered Louis-Claude Daquin among his pupils.

Bernier offered a personal solution to the union of French and Italian tastes. He achieved equilibrium between the two styles in his first book of French cantatas, a genre of which he was one of the first creators together with Jean-Baptiste Morin. Vigorous recitatives and da capo airs, with or without an initial motto, follow each other freely, while the expressive melody, with few wide intervals or long melismas, is rooted more in the French tradition. Les nuits de Sceaux contains Bernier's only instrumental pieces: dances and two overtures which adopt the Lullian structure but are italianate in style. The 45 petits motets, the 36 grands motets and the 39 cantatas exhibit a stylistic feature peculiar to Bernier: the often systematic repetition of a motif, whether or not it is transposed. Bernier had a reputation as a contrapuntist, and the polished writing of fugal choruses in Beatus vir and Confitebor tibi Domine bear witness to his skill. Two of his grands motets were sung several times at the Concert Spirituel from 1725 onwards. Most of his Principes de composition is devoted to two-part counterpoint; the work resembles the treatises of Nivers and Masson."

== Works ==
all printed works published in Paris

== Sacred Vocal ==
[26] Motets, 1–3vv, bc, some with insts, op.1 (1703)

16 for 1v, 7 for 2vv, 3 for 3vv

[15] Motets, 1–3vv, bc, some with insts, op.2 (1713)

11 for 1v, 3 for 2vv, 1 for 3vv

3 motets, 1v, and 1 motet, 3vv, in Motets ... par Mr. de la Croix, 1–3vv, bc, some with insts, op.1 (1741)

Grands motets, all SATBB, str: Beatus vir, F-Pc; Benedic anima mea, Pc; Cantate Domino, LYm; Confitebor tibi Domine, Pc; Cum invocarem, LYm; Deus noster refugium, Pc; Lauda anima mea Dominum, Pc; Lauda Jerusalem, Pc; Laudate Dominum quoniam, Pc; Miserere mei, Pc; Venite exultemus, Pc

[9] Leçons de Ténèbres, S, bc, LYm, V

Mass; Te Deum: both lost

Chants des offices de différents Saints nouveaus, cited in Privilège Général, 3 March 1724, lost

Motets attrib. Bernier, all doubtful authenticity: Quis habitat, Resonate, Salve regina, Sicut cervus, all Pn; Haec dies quam fecit Dominus, LYm

== Secular Vocal ==
[24] Cantates françoises ou musique de chambre, 1–2vv, bc, some with insts, bk 1–4 (1703)

repr, in The Eighteenth-Century French Cantata, vi–vii (New York, 1990)

21 for 1v, 3 for 2vv

Les nymphes de Diane, cantate françoise, 2vv, bc (1703)

repr. in The Eighteenth-Century French Cantata, vi (New York, 1990)

Les nuits de Sceaux, concerts de chambre, ou cantates françoises, solo vv, bc, insts, bk 5 (1715)

repr. in The Eighteenth-Century French Cantata, viii (New York, 1990)

2 divertissements

[6] Cantates françoises, ou musique de chambre, 1v, bc, some with insts, bk 6 (1718)

repr. in The Eighteenth-Century French Cantata, viii (New York, 1990)

[6] Cantates françoises, ou musique de chambre, 1v, bc, some with insts, bk 7 (1723)

repr. in The Eighteenth-Century French Cantata, viii (New York, 1990)

1 air in Recueil d'airs sérieux et à boire (1706)

several airs in Nouvelles poésies, bk 1–8 (1703–7)

1 air in Nouveau recueil de chansons choisies, bk 7 (1736)

Works in Pc attrib. Bernier, all doubtful authenticity: Polyphème, cantata, B, insts [2 copies, 1 without insts]; 3 duos and 1 air in Recueil d'airs choisies

== Writing ==
Principes de composition de Mr Bernier (MS, F-Pn, n.d.); Eng. trans. in P.F. Nelson, Nicolas Bernier: Principles of Composition (Brooklyn, NY, 1964)

== Bibliography ==
N. Dufourcq and M. Benoit: ‘A propos de Nicolas Bernier (1665–1734)’, RdM, 39 (1957), 78–91

P.F. Nelson: Nicolas Bernier (1665–1734): a Study of the Composer and his Sacred Works (diss., U. of North Carolina, 1958)

P.F. Nelson: ‘Nicolas Bernier: a Résumé of his Works’, RMFC, 1 (1960), 93–8

P.F. Nelson: ‘Principes de composition de Mr Bernier’, RMFC, 2 (1961–2), 95–8

P.F. Nelson: ‘Nicolas Bernier (1665–1734): a Bibliographic Study’, Studies in Musicology, ed. J.W. Pruett (Chapel Hill, 1969), 109–17

D. Tunley: The Eighteenth-Century French Cantata (London, 1974, 2/1997)

P.F. Nelson: ‘Nicolas Bernier’, RMFC, 18 (1978), 51–87; xix (1979), 51–101

J.A. Kotylo: A Historical and Stylistic Study of the Petit Motet 1700–1730 (diss., U. of Colorado, 1979)

M.J. Voloshin: The Secular Cantatas of Nicolas Bernier (diss., U. of Kentucky, 1984)

Jean-Paul C. Montagnier: ‘Attributing Early Music: the Case of Nicolas Bernier’, Recercare, 4 (1992), 81–104

Jean-Paul C. Montagnier: ‘De l'air da capo à un embryon français de “forme sonate”: les cas du Confitebor tibi et du Beatus vir de Nicolas Bernier’, Revue de Musicologie, 79 (1993), 308–18

Jean-Paul C. Montagnier: ‘Nicolas Bernier's Principes de composition and the Italian Partimento Tradition’, Early Music, 49 (February 2021), p. 87-100.
