= Gabriel Expilly =

Pierre Gabriel Expilly (c. 1630 – c. 1690) was a 17th-century French viol player and composer.

== Biography ==
Gabriel Expilly's origin and education are unknown. The name is of Savoie origin (Savoie, Isère).

=== Sub-Master of the Chapelle du roi ===
His first known job was as a sub-master of the Chapelle Royale of Versailles. The death of Jean Veillot had been the occasion to renew the position of sub-master, which had been divided into quarters (trimesters). In two stages, it seems that the positions fell to Thomas Gobert, Pierre Robert, Henry Du Mont and Gabriel Expilly. For Expilly, his quarter seems to be the result of the duplication of the semiannual charge, first passed to Thomas Gobert and had been the subject of a competition in 1663, if one believes what Pierre Perrin writes in the preface to his Cantica pro capella regis (1665):

S’il luy plaist [à Louis XIV] de se ressouvenir du succès qu’ont eu plusieurs de ces cantiques, lorsqu’ils ont été chantez dans sa Chapelle ; entr’autres celuy du Martyr que luy fit entendre le sieur Expilly, lors de sa concurrence à la maistrise, qui ravit toute vostre cour, & qui fit dire à Votre Majesté qu’il avait combattu avec des armes avantageuses; & en suitte ceux dont il l’a régalée pendant son quartier, de Sainte Anne & de la Vierge martyre...

Expilly held the quarter from July to September; he received wages of 1650 lt for his 1664 quarter, which includes his personal wages, food and pages maintenance. In 1666 his wages were only 450 lt. He resigned in July 1668 without us knowing the cause of his departure. At this point, the sub-master's charge remained divided by quarters, but with two sub-masters alternating between them. (Pierre Robert and Henry Du Mont).

=== Viol player from the King's Chamber ===
Expilly then became a viol player in the King's Chamber. He is cited several times in the payment lists of the Chamber, at 600 lt per year. Around 1678, he worked alongside Charles Le Camus, then around 1688 with Étienne Lemoyne, successor of the previous one, both viol players.

On 31 December 1689, he resigned his office in favour of Antoine Forqueray. Since traces of him disappear after that, it is supposed he died shortly afterwards.

== Works ==
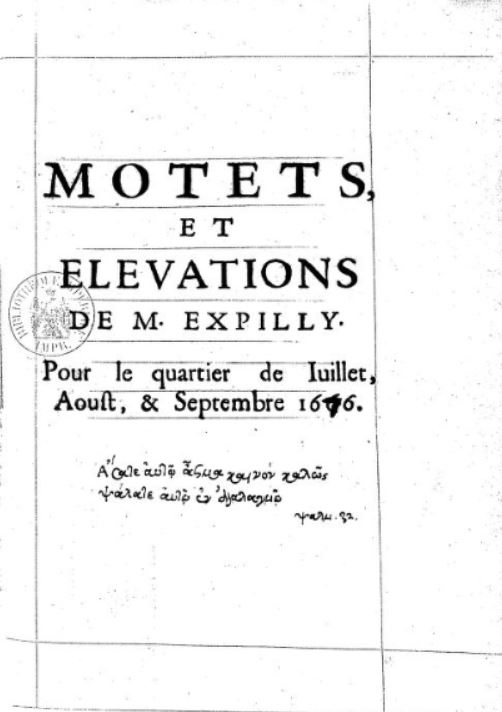
Title page of the booklet of Motets et élévations d'Expilly (1666). Paris BNF.

Expilly wrote a significant amount of religious music, which seems to have earned him some esteem from his contemporaries, but his work is completely lost. The only remaining evidence is the printed booklet for the service of the Chapelle royale:

- Motets et élévations de M. Expilly. Pour le quartier de juillet, aoust et septembre 1666. [Paris, Robert III Ballard], 1666, in-4° digitalized on Gallica.

This booklet contains the texts of 35 motets, including 7 psalms, 4 hymns and 9 pieces by Pierre Perrin; it also contains 8 elevations, including a psalm and 3 texts by Perrin. This repertoire seems quite similar in function to the one Henry Du Mont produced at the same time: motets (probably with a large chorus) for the stages of divine service and, for elevations, more intimate pieces with a small number of members. Some of these lyrics had also been set to music by Thomas Gobert and Du Mont.

Four motet texts are also mentioned with his name in the manuscript collection of Pierre Perrin's works of verse.

== Bibliography ==
- Laurence Decobert, Henry Du Mont (1610-1684), maistre et compositeur de la musique de la Chapelle du Roy et de la Reyne. Liège : Mardaga ; Versailles : CMBV, 2011. partially digitalized on Google books.
- Marcelle Benoit, Musiques de cour : chapelle, chambre, écurie, recueil de documents on WorldCat. Paris, Picard, 1971.
- Laurent Guillo, Pierre I Ballard et Robert III Ballard, imprimeurs du roy pour la musique (1599-1673) on philidor.cmbv.fr Sprimont and Versailles: 2003. 2 vol.
