= Jean Veillot =

French composer and priest

Jean Veillot (died before 1662) was a French composer and priest.

In 1640, he succeeded Henry Frémart as maître de chapelle at Notre-Dame de Paris then replaced François Cosset, when he took charge in 1643 as sous-maître of the Chapelle royale. After the death of Eustache Picot in 1651, he undertook duties alternating with Thomas Gobert.

== Works ==
Three motets for double choir

== Bibliography ==
- Marcelle Benoît, Versailles et les musiciens du Roi, 1661-1733 : étude institutionnelle et sociale. Paris: Picard, 1971.
- Michel Brenet (pseud. of Marie Bobillier, Les musiciens de la Sainte-Chapelle du Palais : documents inédits, recueillis et annotés. Paris, A. Picard, 1910.
- Yolande de Brossard, Musiciens de Paris 1535–1792, d'après le fichier Laborde. Paris: Picard, 1965.
- Yolande de Brossard. La vie musicale en France d’après Loret et ses continuateurs, 1650-1688. Recherches sur la musique française classique 10 (1970) (pp. 117–193).
- John Burke: "Sacred music at Notre-Dame-des-Victoires under Mazarin and Louis XIV", Recherches sur la musique française classique 20 (1981), (pp. 19–44).
- François Léon Chartier. L’ancien chapitre de Notre-Dame de Paris et sa maîtrise d’après les capitulaires (1326–1790) avec un appendice musical.... Paris: 1897.
- Madeleine Jurgens. Documents du Minutier central concernant l’histoire de la musique (1600–1650). Tome premier [études I – X]. Paris: 1967.
- Denise Launay, Les motets à double choeur en France dans la première moitié du XVIIe siècle, Revue de musicologie 39-40 (1957), (pp. 173–195).
- Denise Launay, A propos de deux manuscrits musicaux aux armes de Louis XIII, Fontes artis musicæ 13 (1966/1), (pp. 63–67).
- Denise Launay, La musique religieuse en France du Concile de Trente à 1804. Paris: Société française de musicologie, 1993.
- Catherine Massip, La Vie des musiciens de Paris au temps de Mazarin (1643-1661): essai d'étude sociale. Paris: Picard, 1976.
- Henri Sauval, Histoire et recherches des antiquités de la ville de Paris, tome premier. Paris, 1724. Digitalized on Internet Archive.
