= Sainte-Chapelle (choir) =

The Sainte-Chapelle was the name for the chapelle, the men of the clerical and musical institution which attached to the building, the Sainte-Chapelle (built 1243–1249), in Paris.

The establishment of the Sainte-Chapelle royale consisted of a treasurer, canons, and college - the members of which may have overlapped with the choir and instrumentalists. However, following the dissolution of the musical establishment in the French Revolution, the term Sainte-Chapelle after 1803 applies only to the building.

== Cappella ==
The distinction between the men and the building comes from the original meaning of French chapelle, as with Italian cappella or Spanish capilla, to mean a choral establishment, rather than the building where the priests, singers and instrumentalists of the chapelle were based. Consequently, as with the Chapelle royale the Sainte-Chapelle originally indicated not only the building, but more the costs and functions of clerical and musical establishment attached to it. However, unlike the Chapelle-royale the choir of the Sainte-Chapelle did not change residence or travel with the king.

== Between King and Pope ==
The Burgundian Duke Hugues III founded a Sainte-Chapelle in 1172. Although this is not the direct ancestor of the Saint-Chapelle established to serve the new building in the 1240s, Duke Hugues' Sainte-Chapelle also found itself between royal and papal authority. Rivalry between the Sainte-Chapelle and Chapelle royale existed from at least 1511 when Louis XII was petitioned by both the treasurer of the Sainte-Chapelle and the master of the Chapelle royale for funds.

== Masters of the Sainte-Chapelle ==
Notable composers who served as maîtres and sous-maîtres of the Sainte-Chapelle include Pierre Certon, Claudin de Sermisy, Nicolas Formé, Thomas Gobert, and Jean Veillot, but the most notable was perhaps Marc-Antoine Charpentier, from 1698. The masters were not only responsible for music for services, but also for the care of the enfants de la chapelle, the boys choir. Although this was officially part of Charpentier's job, from the 1460s the non-musical responsibilities in regard to the boys in practice delegated to the maître de grammaire (grammar teacher) and sous-maîtres of the chapelle.
