= Lagorce =

Lagorce may refer to:

Places

- Lagorce, Ardèche, a commune in Ardèche, France
- Lagorce, Gironde, a commune in Gironde, France
- La Gorce Island, Miami Beach, Florida

People

- Franck Lagorce (born 1968), French racing driver
- Guy Lagorce (1937–2023), French sprinter, journalist and writer
- Marcel Lagorce (1932–2023), French classical trumpeter
