= Chapelle royale =

Musical establishment of French kings

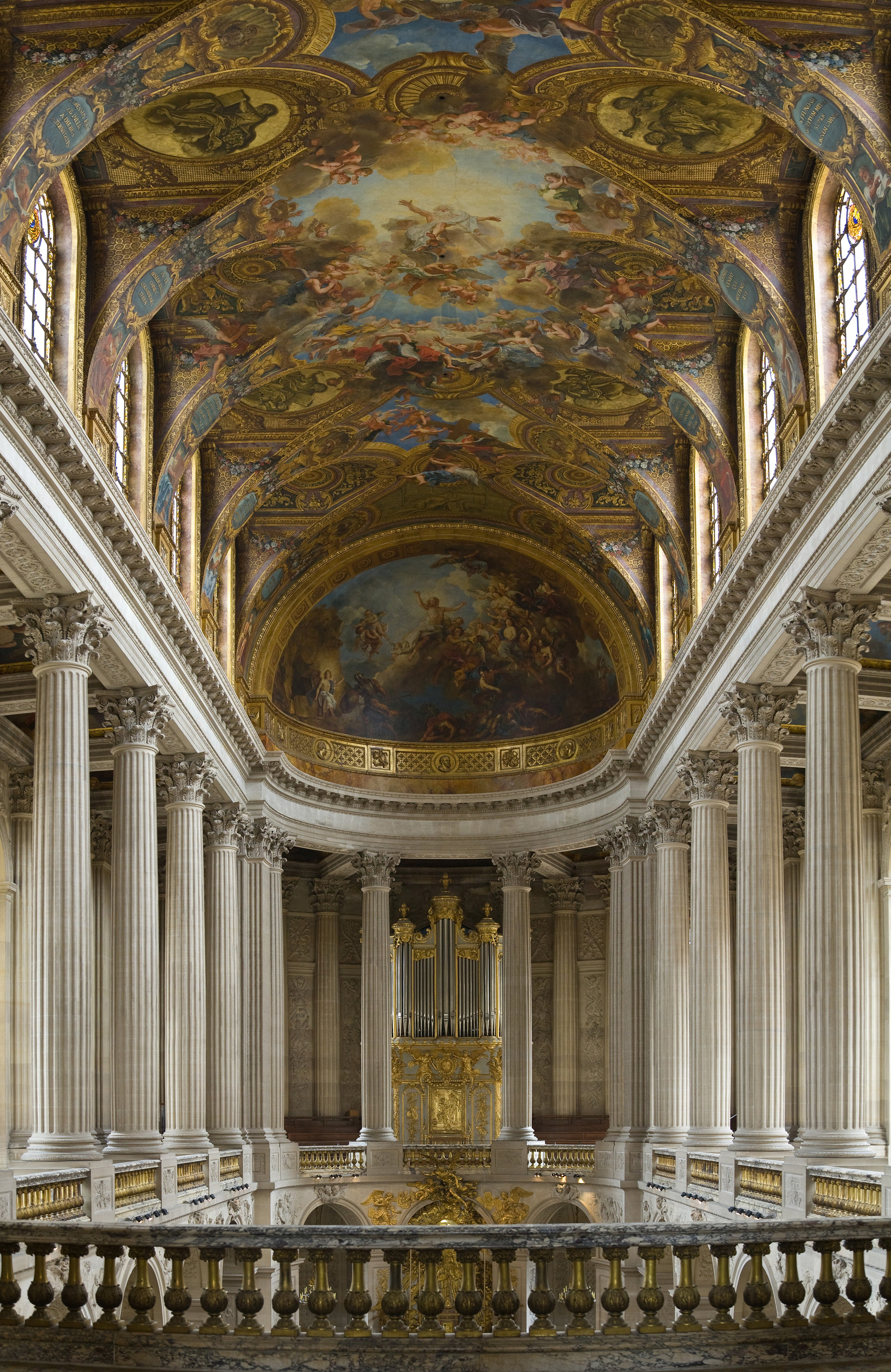
A four segment vertical panorama of the Royal Chapel of the Palace of Versailles (2006)

The chapelle royale (chapel royal) was the musical establishment attached to the royal chapel of the French kings. The term may also be applied to the chapel buildings, the Chapelle royale de Versailles.

The establishment included a choir, organist and instrumentalists and was separate from the musique du chambre which performed secular music.

== Maîtres and sous-maîtres of the Chapelle Royale ==
=== During the reign of Louis XII (1498–1515) ===
- Josquin des Prez premier chantre de la chapelle de Louis XII

In 1511 Louis XII decided the responsibilities of the treasurer of the Sainte-Chapelle and the master of the chapelle royale. The death, and sumptuous 40-day funeral of Louis' wife, Anne of Brittany in 1514 marks the origin of a unified chapelle royale combining the chapels of both Louis and Anne. Though at Anne's funeral the two chapels sang separately for the last time. Louis' Chapelle du Roi led by Antoine de Févin, included Johannes Prioris, Costanzo Festa, and Antoine de Longueval but not Jean Braconnier (died 1512). Anne's Chapelle de la Reine led by Antoine Divitis included Jean Mouton, Jean Richafort, Claudin de Sermisy, and Pierre Moulu.

=== François I (1515–1547) ===
- François I inherited all 29 singers of the combined chapels of Louis and Anne. Claudin de Sermisy, who was earlier noted as clerc musicien of the Sainte-Chapelle in 1508, and in 1515 as a member of the Chapelle Royale under Louis XII, from 1532 became sous-maître of the chapelle of François I. From 1547 to 1553, Guillame Belin and Hilaire Rousseau also were sous-maîtres de la chapelle.

=== Henri II (1547–1559), François II (1559–1560) ===
- Pierre Certon (died 1572).

=== Charles IX (1560–1574), Henri III (1574–1589), Henri IV, Bourbon (1589–1610) ===
Henri IV was the king whom legend tells said "Paris is worth a Mass."

- Eustache du Caurroy maître de la chapelle du roi
- Nicolas Morel
- Estienne Le Roy

=== During the reign of Louis XIII (1610–1643) ===
- Eustache Picot
- Nicolas Formé, sous-maître from 1609 to 1638
- Jacques Blondin, maitre de la chapelle royale de Paris

=== During the reign of Louis XIV (1643–1715) "The Sun King" ===
- Jean Veillot, sous-maître from 1643 to 1662
- Thomas Gobert, sous-maître from 1654 to 1668.
- Henry Du Mont (1610–1684), sous-maître from 1663 to 1683; compositeur from 1672.
- Pierre Robert (composer) (c. 1615 – 1699), sous-maître from 1663 to 1683; compositeur from 1672.
- Nicolas Le Prince.

On the 1683 retirement of Henry Du Mont and Pierre Robert the position of maître of the chapelle was divided into four positions:

- Pascal Collasse (1649–1709), sous-maître from 1683 to 1704, assistant to Lully until 1683, when he won one of the four seasonal assignments into which the Chapelle Royale directorship had been divided. His later years were devoted to alchemy.
- Michel Richard Delalande (1657–1726), sous-maître from 1683 to 1723.
- Nicolas Goupillet (1650–1713), sous-maître from 1683 - but in 1693 dismissed for plagiarism of Henri Desmarest.
- Guillaume Minoret, sous-maître from 1683 to 1714

=== Louis XV (1715–1774) ===
- Charles-Hubert Gervais (1671–1744), In 1721 named one of four sous-maîtres
- André Campra (1660–1744), sous-maître from 1721
- Nicolas Bernier (1664–1734), sous-maître from 1721
- Anne Danican Philidor (1681–1728) sous-maître from 1723
- Henry Madin (1698–1748), sous-maître from 1736
- Jean-Joseph Cassanéa de Mondonville (1711–1772), maître de musique de la chapelle du roi. Acquired the reversion of André Campra's post in 1740, he acceded to the position itself on 4 March 1744 on the death of Charles-Hubert Gervais. But since he was not permitted to publish the motets he composed for the chapel, he resigned from the post in 1758.

1761 Four posts reduced to two.

- Esprit Antoine Blanchard (1696–1770)
- Abbé Charles Gauzargues (1725–1799)
- Julien Amable Mathieu (1734–1811)

=== During the reign of Louis XVI (1774–1792) ===
- François Giroust

=== Chapelle de l'Empereur (1804–1814) ===
- Jean-François Le Sueur

=== Louis XVIII (1815–1824), Charles X (1824–1830) ===
- Luigi Cherubini from 1816, directeur

=== Louis Philippe I (1830–1848), Second Empire (1852–1870) ===
- Daniel François Esprit Auber succeeded Cherubini and then was maître de chapelle of Napoléon III from 1852.

== Organists ==
- François d'Agincourt
- Guillaume-Antoine Calvière (1685–1755)
- François Couperin, organist (January trimester) from 1693 to 1730
- Jean Buterne, (April trimester)
- Guillaume-Gabriel Nivers, organist (July trimester)
- Nicolas Lebègue, (October trimester)
- Jacques Thomelin
- Jean-Baptiste Buterne
- Gabriel Garnier
- Louis Marchand
- Jean-François Dandrieu
- Nicolas-Hubert Paulin
- Louis-Claude Daquin
- Pierre-Claude Foucquet, succeeded François d'Agincourt in 1758
- Jean Landrin
- Claude-Bénigne Balbastre
- Armand-Louis Couperin
- Jean-Jacques Le Bourgeois
- Pierre-Louis Couperin
- Nicolas Séjan

== See also ==
La Chapelle Royale founded in 1977 in Paris by the Belgian conductor Philippe Herreweghe.
