= Closset =

Closset is a surname. Notable people with the surname include:

- Marc Closset (born 1974), Belgian table tennis player
- Marie Closset (1873–1952), Belgian poet
- Roger Closset (1933–2020), French fencer

== See also ==
- Cosset (disambiguation)
