= Louis Joseph Marchand =

Louis Joseph Marchand may refer to:

- Louis-Joseph Marchand (musician) (1692–1774), French music theorist, composer, choir director, and priest
- Louis-Joseph-Narcisse Marchand (1791–1876), French memoirist on Napoleon Bonaparte who served as Bonaparte's valet
