= Méduse (opera) =

Méduse, tragédie en musique (Medusa) is an opera by the French composer Charles-Hubert Gervais (1671-1744), ordinaire de la Musique of the Duc de Chartres. The opera was first performed at the Académie Royale de Musique (the Paris Opera) on 13 January 1697. It takes the form of a tragédie en musique in a prologue and five acts. The libretto, by the dramatist Abbé Claude Boyer (1618-1688), concerns the Greek myth of Medusa.

== Synopsis ==
The opera consists of five acts and a prologue.

Prologue

The theater represents a beautiful countryside from which one can see the Temple de l'Amour in the distance. Shepherds and shepherdesses are in the midst of preparations for la fête de l'Amour. The shepherdess Iris, however, has decided to leave the celebrations early because she has abandoned love for "happy and wise indifference." Before leaving, she announces that the shepherds and shepherdesses are about to see a performance of a story in which jealous love curses Medusa with a horrible transformation. The shepherds and shepherdesses break into a chorus celebrating Louis XIV, who grants peace to his kingdom, as long as his enemies do not force him to wage war.

Act I

The theater represents a seaport. Méduse and her confidants, Orphise and Melante, discuss preparations for a beauty contest between Méduse and Minerve. Orphise and Melante question Méduse's agitated demeanor, assuring her of her fortune in the fact that Neptune has promised to defend her beauty against Minerva's. Medusa admits that she is upset that Persée, the Greek prince, is defending Minerve. She argues that, even if she appears to show signs of falling in love with Persée, she is in fact only intent on bribing him away from his defense of Minerve. At the end of the act, Palemon and troupes of Tritons, Nereids, and maritime people arrive to celebrate Méduse's beauty and Neptune's declaration to defend Méduse against Minerve.

Act II

The scene is set at the Temple of Minerve. Persée reveals to Arcas that the reason for his frequent visits to Minerve's temple is an excuse to see Princess Ismenie, who has retreated to the temple in her effort to escape Méduse's jealousy. Ismenie arrives onstage and confesses that she is frightened that Minerve will punish their love because it distracts Persée from his duty to glory. When Minerve arrives, however, Persée convinces the goddess that his love only adds to his glory. Neptune, Méduse, and her supporters arrive at the temple to defend Méduse's claim to beauty. Before the argument grows out of hand, Jupiter appears and destroys the temple to mark Minerve's fury. Persée and Ismenie decide to leave the city to find a safe haven under Minerve's protection.

Act III

The scene begins on the seashore, where Ismenie waits to board a ship with Persée. Ismenie worries that her situation puts her personal gloire in danger. As soon as she and Persée board their vessel, sea monsters who support Méduse create a tempest that causes the ship to strike a rock. Meanwhile, Neptune informs Méduse that Persée loves Ismenie. On hearing this, Méduse expresses her terrible rage and jealousy.

Act IV

The scene takes place in the garden of the Hesperides, where the trees carry golden apples. Neptune has captured Persée and Ismenie. Méduse orders her sisters, the Hesperides, to try to convince Persée to love Méduse when Neptune brings him to the garden. Despite the Hesperides' enticements, Persée's love for Ismenie is unchanged. Angered, Méduse threatens to kill Ismenie. Meanwhile, Neptune, who has been in love with Méduse all along, grows increasingly jealous of Méduse's love for Persée. He vows to avenge himself of his unrequited love.

Act V

The scene changes to a frightening desert in which lies the cave of the Gorgons. Méduse brings Persée and Ismenie to the cave, declaring that Ismenie must renounce her love for Persée or perish. Jupiter appears in the clouds, however, and announces that Minerve has punished Méduse by transforming her into a terrible monster. Méduse looks at Ismenie and transforms her to stone with her new powers. Fortunately, Minerve reverses the transformation and brings Persée and Ismenie to her palace to celebrate their marriage.

== Sources ==
- Jean-Paul C. Montagnier, “Claude Boyer librettiste: remarques sur Méduse,” Revue d’histoire du théâtre 191 (1996), pp. 303-320.
- Jean-Paul C. Montagnier,Charles-Hubert Gervais (1671-1744), un musicien au service du Régent et de Louis XV. Paris: CNRS Editions, 2001.

(in French) Libretto at "Livrets baroques"

- (in French) Félix Clément and Pierre Larousse Dictionnaire des Opéras, Paris, 1881, page 448.
