= Eustache Picot =

Eustache Picot (died 1651) was a French musician and composer. He was maître de musique of the maîtrise Saint-Evode at the cathedral of Rouen (1601-1604), and sous-maître of the chapelle royale of Louis XIII, following Nicolas Formé, from 1609 till his death. He was succeeded by Thomas Gobert. Despite his reputation in his own lifetime only fragments of his works survive. The king gave him the abbaye de Chaulmoy and a canonry at the Sainte Chapelle.
