= Hypermnestre =

Hypermnestre (Hypermnestra) is an opera by the French composer Charles-Hubert Gervais, first performed at the Académie Royale de Musique (the Paris Opera) on 3 November 1716. It takes the form of a tragédie en musique in a prologue and five acts. The libretto, by Joseph de Lafont, concerns the Greek myth of Hypermnestra.

== Discography ==
- Hypermnestre, Purcell Choir, Orfeo Orchestra, Katherine Watson, Mathias Vidal, Thomas Dolié, Philippe-Nicolas Martin, Chantal Santon-Jeffery, Juliette Mars, Manuel Munez Camelino, conducted by György Vashegyi. 2 CD Glossa 2019. 5 Diapasons

== Sources ==
- Jean-Paul C. Montagnier, « Les deux versions du cinquième acte d’Hypermnestre de Charles-Hubert Gervais », Revue de musicologie, 82 (1996), pp. 331-343.
- Jean-Paul C. Montagnier, Charles-Hubert Gervais (1671-1744), un musicien au service du Régent et de Louis XV. Paris: CNRS Editions, 2001.

(in French) Libretto at "Livrets baroques"

- (in French) Félix Clément and Pierre Larousse Dictionnaire des Opéras, Paris, 1881, page 349
