= Jean-Baptiste Nôtre =

French composer and organist

- Born: 4 September 1732; Toul, France
- Died: 20 February 1807 (aged 74); Toul
- Occupations: Composer; Organist

Jean-Baptiste Nôtre (4 September 1732 – 20 February 1807) was a French composer and organist.

== Biography ==
Born in Toul, Jean-Baptiste Nôtre's father, Jacob Notter, from Mels near Sargans in Switzerland, married in Toul in 1721 and settled there, after serving as a soldier in the Esly regiment; he became the Swiss of the cathedral, under the French name Jacques Nôtre.

Jean-Baptiste Nôtre, who was initially a choirboy in the cathedral, probably received his first organ lessons from the organists Noirel et Martelet. In 1754, the canons awarded him a scholarship to train for six months in Paris by Guillaume-Antoine Calvière (1695–1755), one of the organists of the Chapelle Royale and titular at Notre-Dame de Paris. When he returned, they named him organist of the Toul Cathedral, which had a magnificent instrument built by Nicolas Dupont between 1751 and 1755.

He was asked to appraise the organs of the Cistercian abbey Notre-Dame de Beaupré. (1775), the abbatiale Saint-Pierre-et-Saint-Paul de Neuwiller-lès-Saverne (1778), the Saint-Vincent de Metz abbey (1779), as well as those of the Nancy Cathedral (1787, 1789).

In 1793, he was commissioned to estimate the organs of all the churches in Toul, which became national property. Even though the French Revolution suspended his activities for a while, he remained organist of the cathedral until his death.

In 1757, he married Nancy Françoise Mangin, daughter of an innkeeper, who gave him five children. Their daughter Marguerite Nôtre (1759–1837) was an organist in the Lunéville parish of Saint-Jacques.

== His Livre d'orgue ==
Preserved at the Municipal Library of Châlons-en-Champagne (manuscript 941), among the scores from the organist Jean-Baptiste Charbonnier (1764–1859), and entitled Livres de piesses d'orgue par l'organiste de Toul, the collection of Nôtre's pieces contains eight suites of nine short pieces, ordered by ton, which could in fact be verses for the Magnificat:

- [First ton]: Plein jeux. Fugue grave. Duo. Trio. Basse de trompette. Récit. Duo. Grand jeux. Grand jeux.
- [Second ton]: Plein jeux. Fugue grave. Duo. Trio. Cornet. Basse de trompette. Grand jeu. Récit de cromhorne. Grand jeux.
- [Third ton]: Plein jeux. Fugue grave. Duo. Trio. Récit. Cornet. Trio. Grand jeux. Grand jeux.
- [Fourth tone]: Plein jeux. Fugue grave. Duo. Trio. Récit. Cornet. Duo. Grand jeux. Grand jeux.
- [Fifth ton]: Plein jeux. Fugue grave. Duo. Récit. Clairinette. Basse de trompette. Trio. Grand jeux. Grand jeux.
- [Sixth ton]: Plein jeux. Fugue grave. Duo. Clairinette. Duo. Trio. Basse de trompette. Grand jeux. Grand jeux.
- [Seventh ton]: Plein jeux. Fugue grave. Duo. Récit. Trompette. Trio. Basse de trompette. Grand jeux. Grand jeux.
- [Eight ton]: Plein jeux. Fugue grave. Duo. Trio. Clairinette. Cornet. Récit. Grand jeux. Grand jeux.

While in keeping with the great French tradition of liturgical organ books, Nôtre's book reflects the evolution of taste in the second half of the 18th century, particularly the influence of German music for the pianoforte. The pieces are written without a pedal and can be played on the piano.

== Modern edition of the Livre d'orgue ==
Jean-Baptiste Nôtre, Livre d'orgue…, published by Jean-Luc Gester, intr. by Jean-Luc Gester and Damien Vaisse, Hombourg-Haut: Institut Théodore Gouvy, 2003, 66 p.

== Bibliography ==
- Gustave Clanché, La musique, le chœur, le bas-chœur de la cathédrale de Toul (documents historiques), Toul, 1936.
- Olivier Douchain, Les organistes laïques du diocèse de Toul aux XVIIe–XVIIIe, Recherches sur la musique française classique, vol. 20, 1981, (pp. 77–181), vol. 21, 1983, (pp. 43–117) and vol. 22, 1984, (pp. 164–218).
- Jean-Luc Gester et Damien Vaisse, Jean-Baptiste Nôtre, organiste de Toul, et son Livre d'orgue, Études touloises, no. 109, 2004, (pp. 29-39); article republished with some supplements in La Tribune de l'orgue. Revue suisse romande, vol. 57/1, 2005, (pp. 10-23).

== Discography ==
- Jean-Baptiste Nôtre, Le Livre d'Orgue – Pascal Vigneron at the large Curt Schwenkedel organs (1963) of the Toul Cathedral and the historical organ of Charles Cachet (1720) at Domgermain – ref. Quantum QM 7064 (2012).
- The "Livres de Piesses dorgue" by Jean-Baptiste Nôtre was recorded (October 2016) by Dominique Dantand, titular of the historical Küttinger organ of Vézelise, organ received and played by J-B Nôtre in 1775. The CD is available from the Association des Amis de l'orgue de Vézelise.
