= Pascal Vigneron =

French organist, conductor and trumpeter (born 1963)

Pascal Vigneron (born 23 June 1963) is a French classical musician, both trumpeter, organist, and conductor.

== Life ==
Born in Commercy (Lorraine), Vigneron's genealogy goes back to 1841, when his ancestors lived in the town of Bruley. He has been a professor at the École normale de musique de Paris from 1999 to 2007 and is the initiator and artistic director of the Bach Festival of Toul founded in 2010.

=== Trumpet ===
Heir to the tradition of the French Trumpet School bequeathed by his masters Roger Delmotte and Marcel Lagorce, his objective was to make this instrument known through original works from Renaissance music to the present day. Pedagogue, musicologist, passionate about art and instrumental making, he has been a privileged collaborator of the Selmer company for 20 years (http://www.selmer.fr).

=== Organist ===
Vigneron was a pupil of Jacques Marichal (organist at the Notre-Dame de Paris cathedral). In 2005, after a work of more than four years, he published Bach's The Art of Fugue with a new instrumentation, for brass, woodwind and organ according to the order of Jacques Chailley.

As an organist, he has recorded Bach's Well Tempered Clavier with Dimitri Vassilakis and Christine Auger. In 2008, he also recorded the Goldberg Variations on the Grand Kurt Schwenkedel Organ of the Toul cathedral and a new setting of The Musical Offering BWV 1079.

=== Conductor ===
Vigneron is the conductor of the Orchestre de chambre du Marais. He has conducted Brahms' Ein deutsches Requiem, the great lyrical works of Mozart, Berlioz' Symphonie fantastique, Stravinsky's L'Histoire du soldat with Hae Sun Kang, Dimitri Vassilakis, André Isoir, Michel Chapuis, François Castang, Monique Zanetti, Jérôme Correas, Kun Woo Paik, Sergei Edelmann, Sylvie Hue as soloists... He has recorded Vivaldi's Four seasons with Frédéric Pelassy as solo violinist.

He has to his credit more than 28 recordings: the complete work with trumpet by Jean Langlais, the complete chorals by Johann Ludwig Krebs, the trumpet concertos by Haydn, Hummel, Telemann, numerous baroque pieces including the Concertos for organ Op. 4 by Haendel with Michel Chapuis.

New works are dedicated to him: pieces by Pierre Jansen (Grand Prix symphonique of the Sacem), Antoine Tisné, Pierre-Yves Level, Pierre Lantier.

He also recorded the Paraphrases sur Les Jours de l'Apocalypse after Armel Guerne's poems (Éditions du Zodiaque, 1967), with Marie-Christine Barrault. They also inaugurated together the Saint-Étienne cathedral of Toul on 20 September 2008 with more than 1200 people attending.

=== Other activities ===
Vigneron masters digital audio and video techniques. In this capacity he was artistic director of the Orchestre national d'Île-de-France conducted by Yoel Levi, for the complete Camille Saint-Saëns's symphonies. Director of the Quantum classic label, he has been artistic director of the Bach festival of Toul since 2010.

== Discography ==
Johann Sebastian Bach

- The Art of fugue BWV 1080 pour cuivres, bois et orgue (Ordonnance des Fugues Jacques Chailley - setting Pascal Vigneron)
- Johann Sebatian Bach, The well-tempered clavier, vol.I and II, Recording with the three required instruments (organ, piano, harpsichord) tuned to the temperament Werckmeister III with Dimitri Vassilakis and Christine Auger, recording prefaced by Michel Chapuis and Gilles Cantagrel
- Johann Sebastian Bach's The Goldberg Variations first critical recording with the three keyboard instruments - Pascal Vigneron, organ, Dimitri Vassilakis, piano and Christine Auger, harpsichord.
- Johann Sebastian Bach's The Musical Offering, Pascal Vigneron, "Curt Schwenkedel" organ of the Temple de l'Annonciation of Paris

Soloists of the Orchestre de Chambre du Marais, Pascal Vigneron's brass ensemble.

- Johann Sebastian Bach's Les Arias pour Mezzo-Soprano et instruments obligés, Pascal Vigneron, "Curt Schwenkedel" organ of the Temple de l'Annonciation of Paris, Anne Maugard, mezzo-soprano, Vinh Pham, violin, Patricia Nagle, flute, Pierre Makareenko, oboe.
- Johann Sebastian Bach, Partitas I-II-III, Pascal Vigneron, organ Curt Schwenkedel du Temple de l'Annonciation de Paris, de la Cathédrale de Toul et de l'église d'Arques-la-Bataille
- Johann Sebastian Bach, Transcriptions for flugelhorn and piano, Preludes Chorales, Sonatas and Arias
- Johann Sebastian Bach's Suites for Cello, transcribed for four-piston flugelhorn

Jean-Baptiste Nôtre

- Jean-Baptiste Nôtre, Le Livre d'orgue, first world recording

Antonio Vivaldi

- Antonio Vivaldi's The four seasons, Frédéric Pelassy, violin - Orchestre de Chambre du Marais - P.Vigneron

Baroque and classical musics

- Georg Friedrich Haendel's Concertos for Organ and Orchestra, Michel Chapuis, Organ, Orchestre du Marais, Pascal Vigneron
- Les Grands Concertos pour Trompette: Haendel, Telemann, Mozart, Haydn, Hummel with the Prague Chamber Orchestra
- Various recordings with organ with Pierre Méa, Vincent Warnier, Jacques Amade, Jean-Paul Imbert, Michael Matthes, etc.
- Several recitals of Italian, English, German music
- Johann Ludwig Krebs: Intégrale des chorals pour trompette et orgue (world premiere)
- L’Art du Cantus Firmus vol.1&2, Bach, Précurseurs, Contemporains et Élèves

French music of the 20th and 21st centuries, including several dedicated creations

- Jacques Chailley, Pierre Jansen, Antoine Tisné, Pierre Yves Level, Marcel Landowski, Jean Rivier, André Jolivet, Pierre Ancelin (with organ)
- Jean Aubain, Pierre Lantier, Georges Enesco, Jean Hubeau, Florent Schmitt (with piano)
- Jean Langlais, complete works for trumpet and organ
- Paraphrases on Les Jours de l'Apocalypse after Armel Guerne's poems with Marie-Christine Barrault.

- L'Anthologie du cornet à pistons, first volume in 2007, out of twenty volumes planned (world premiere)

Pascal Vigneron's Brass ensemble

- L'Europe des Cuivres, Bach, Gabrielli, Purcell, Lejeune, ... .
