= Guillaume Belin =

Guillaume Belin (? - 1568) (sometimes cited as Bellin, Bellyn, or Belain) was a French Renaissance singer and composer. His known compositions of chansons date to about 1539. Pieces by Belin were included in two of the volumes of "New Songs with Four Parts" published in 1543 and 1544 in Paris by Pierre Affeingnant and Hubert Jullet. He is known to have been employed as a singer at the Chapelle royale circa 1547, and also became sous-maître de la chapelle. He was later at the Sainte-Chapelle where he set music to "Hymns of the Bible" in French. He died the year 1568.
