= François Giroust =

French composer

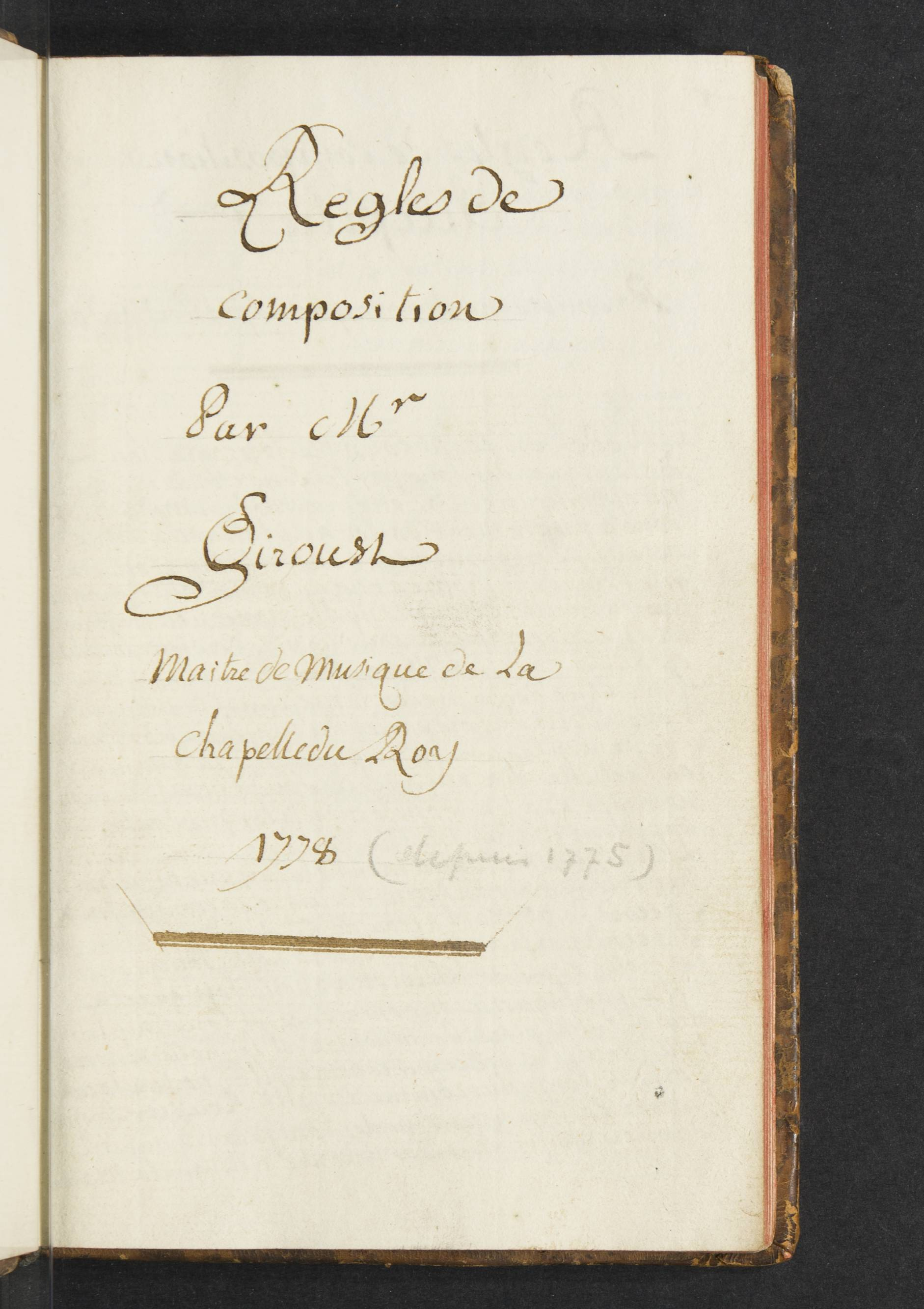
First page of François Giroust's Regles de composition.

François Giroust (10 April 1737 – 28 April 1799) was a French composer. He was born in Paris, where he was the last maître of the Chapelle royale before the French Revolution. He died, aged 62, at Versailles.

== Biography ==
After having studied at the Notre-Dame de Paris with Louis Homet (1691–1767) until 1748 and afterwards with Antoine Goulet, Giroust got appointed as maître de musique (Kapellmeister) at the cathedral of Orléans, where he stayed until 1769. He was very much appreciated by his employers. He also became the leader of the music academy of Orléans (1757-1765), which became a big yet temporary success soon after his appointment.

Two of his works won both 1st and 2nd place in a contest for composers of the Concert Spirituel, organised by the Tuileries in Paris, 1768. Because of this, he was appointed as kapellmeister at the church of the Saint-Innocents in Paris.

On the 17th of February 1775, Giroust became sous maître de chapelle at the Chapelle Royale at Versailles, replacing Charles Gauzargues. This took place under Louis XVI's reign. During his time in this position, he composed the Coronation Mass for Louis XVI, and the Missa pro defunctis for Louis XV.

In 1780, Giroust was appointed as surintendant of the same chapel, a post he kept until 1792. After some financial hardships, he became a concierge at the Palace of Versailles, where he died on 28 April 1799.

Giroust is well known for his many revolutionary pieces, among which the Hymne des Versaillais is the most famous. He joined the revolutionaries after the fall of the monarchy in 1792. Most of his masonic works have been lost, with the exception of the cantata Le Déluge. The majority of his other compositions have been saved by his widow Marie-Françoise de Beaumont d'Avantois, who was a singer at the same court. They are now conserved by the Paris Conservatory. A previously unknown notebook by Giroust titled Regles de composition was recovered in 2015. The manuscript is of educational nature, and explains the basics of composing music. It dates back to 1778. It is currently conserved by KU Leuven.

== Works ==
- 6 masses, including the Coronation Mass for Louis XVI (31 June 1776) and the Missa pro defunctis for Louis XV.
- 70 grands motets.
- Rituel Maçonnique Funèbre "Le Déluge" (1784).
- 14 oratorio's (partly lost).
- 12 Magnificat settings for the cathedral at Orléans.
- Télèphe (opera, lost except for the overture).
- Regles de composition (a notebook on music theory).
- Various revolutionary songs.

== Recordings of works by Giroust ==
=== Incomplete list of recordings ===
- La Psalette d'Orléans, dir. Jean Turellier : Giroust - Prose des Morts (Dies Irae), from Musiques et musiciens d'Orléans, Merjitur, CL 84102, 1984
- Choeur de Chambre de Namur, Musica Polyphonica, dir. Louis Devos: Giroust - Messe Du Sacre De Louis XVI, Super Flumina Babylonis, Prose de Morts (Dies Irae), Erato–2292-45024-2, 1990
- Chœur de Chambre de Namur, Les Agrémens, dir. Jean-Claude Malgoire: Grands Motets / Grétry - Confitebor, Gossec - Terribilis est locus site, Giroust - Benedic anima mea, K617181-HM90, 2006
