= Cosset =

Cosset may refer to:

- François Cosset (c. 1610 – c. 1673), French composer
- Sébastien Cosset (born 1975), French illustrator
- Helicopter parent, also referred to as "cosseting parent"

== See also ==
- Corset, a garment
