= Thomas Gobert =

French priest and composer

Thomas Gobert (Picardy, c. 1600 - 26 September 1672) was a French priest and composer.

In 1630 he was a canon at Saint-Quentin, then maître de chapelle at Péronne, Somme. In 1635 he was appointed aumônier with Armand Jean du Plessis de Richelieu. He succeeded Nicolas Formé as sous-maître of the Chapelle royale. Following the death of Jean Veillot, he was one of the four sous-maîtres with Pierre Robert, Gabriel Expilly and Henry Du Mont. He was charged with the January quarter till 1669.

== Works ==
Few of his works have survived, the grands motets being lost:

- a Paraphrase des Psaumes de David, en vers françois par Antoine Godeau (1659), à 2 voix;
- several airs in the Recueil des plus beaux airs of Benigne de Bacilly (1661);
- 6 pieces in the Livre d'airs de dévotion à 2 parties, of François Berthod (1662).
