= Henri Frémart =

French composer

Henri Frémart (Beauvais, Picardy c. 1595 – 1651) was a French priest and composer. He was at Notre Dame de Paris from 1625 until 1640.

== Works ==
- Missa Confundantur superbi

== Sources ==
- Jean-Paul C. Montagnier, The Polyphonic Mass in France, 1600–1780: The Evidence of the Printed Choirbooks, Cambridge: Cambridge University Press, 2017.
