= Musicians of the King's Road =

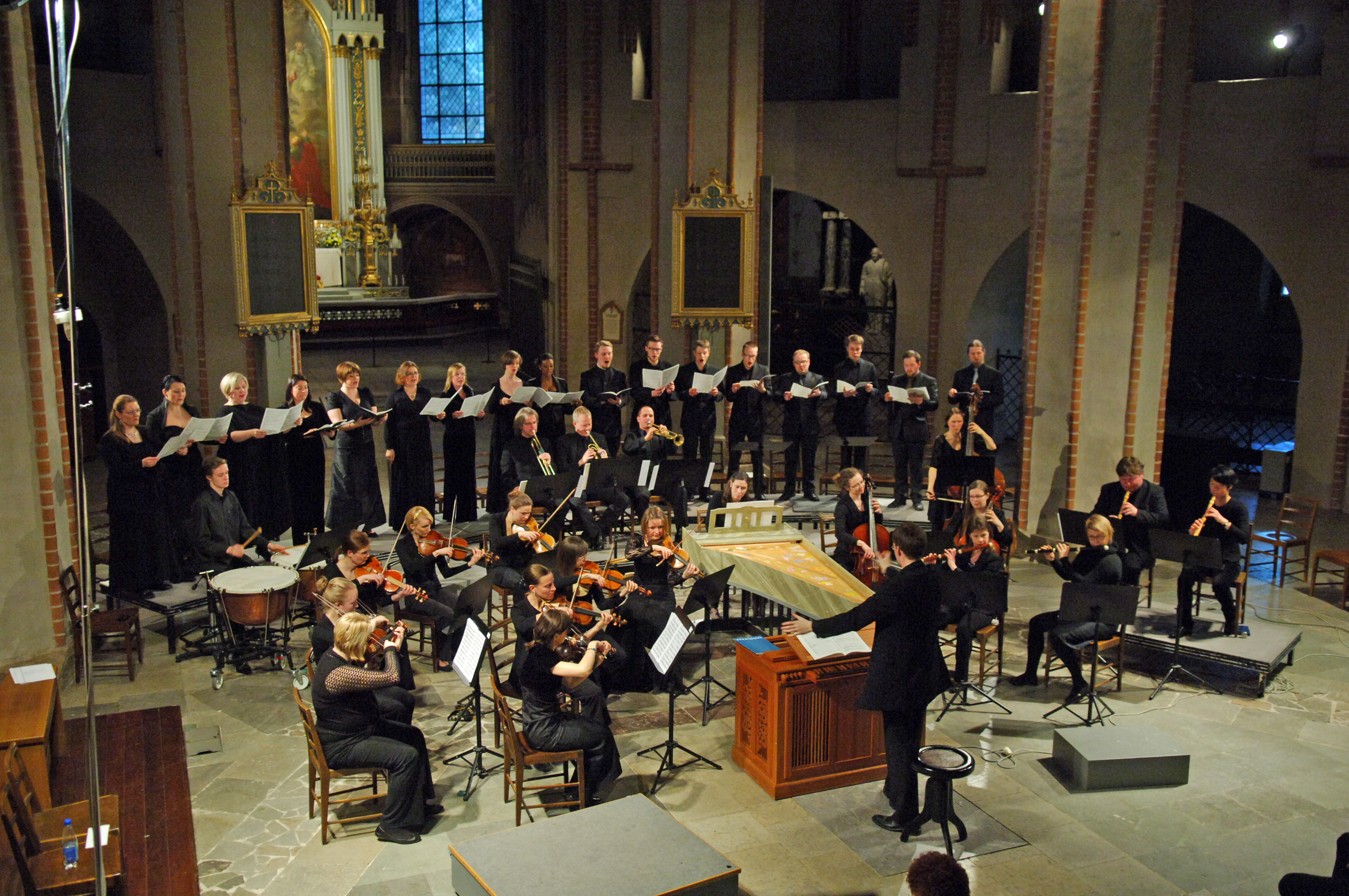
Musicians of the King's Road in Turku Cathedral in 2012

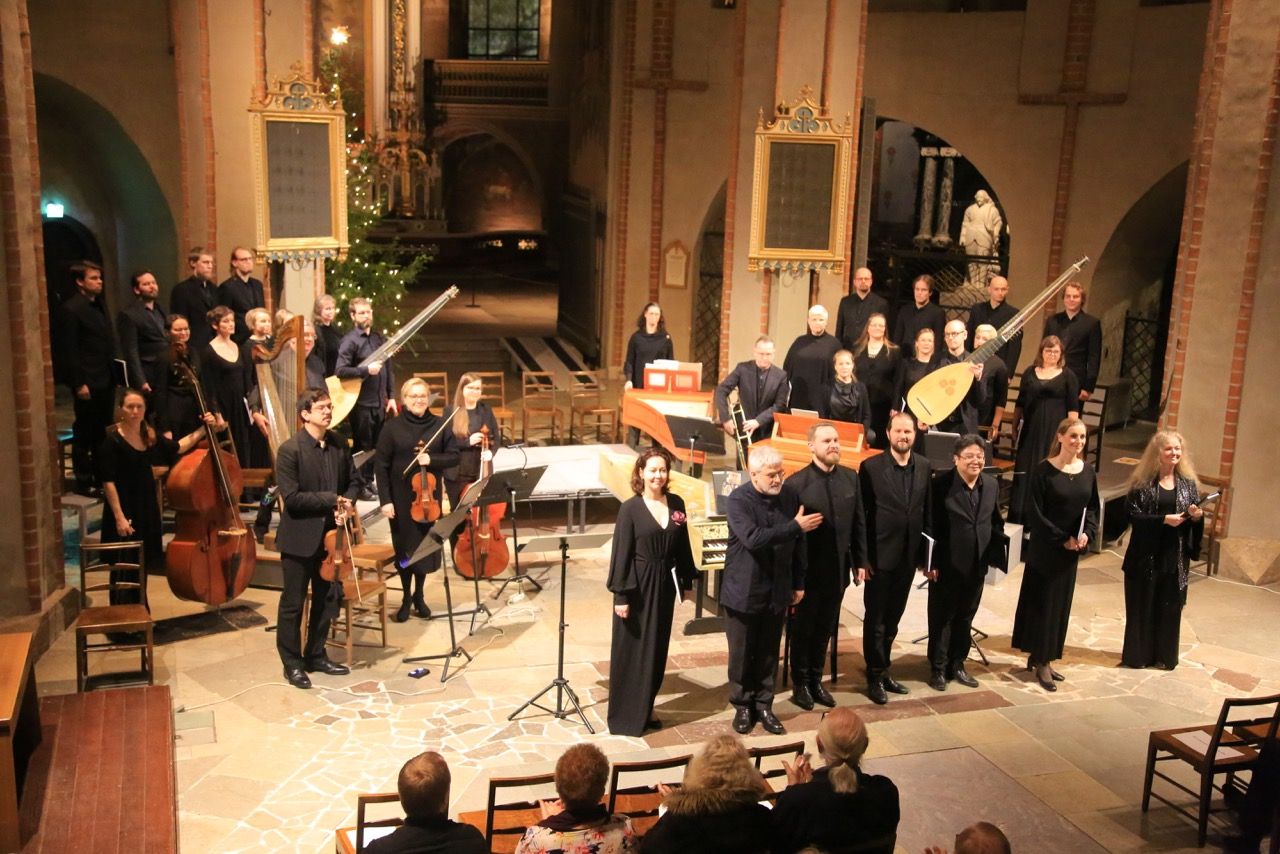
Musicians of the King's Road in Turku Cathedral on 6 January 2020

Musicians of the King's Road (Finnish: Kuninkaantien muusikot, Swedish: Kungsvägens musiker) is a Finnish professional baroque orchestra and choir. The orchestra plays on period instruments.

== Orchestra and choir ==
Musicians of the King's Road is a professional baroque orchestra and choir. The ensemble was founded in the autumn of 2008 in Turku in Finland. It specialises in performing musical rarities written by European composers. The orchestra plays on period instruments. Conductor Markus Yli-Jokipii was the artistic director of Musicians of the King's Road from 2009 to 2015.

Several compositions have been performed for the first time in Finland by Musicians of the King's Road. Many of these works have lain forgotten in archives for a long time and have consequently not been performed for centuries, neither in Finland nor elsewhere. In spring 2013, Musicians of the King's Road performed the 400-year-old St Matthew Passion written by the German composer Melchior Vulpius. The performances were given within a liturgical context in four churches in Southwest Finland. On Good Friday 2014, the passion was performed in the Taulumäki Church in Jyväskylä and a year later in the church of Vähäkyrö in Vaasa. Later on, Musicians of the King’s Road continued the passion cycle by performing historical passion settings by Antoine de Longueval, Jakob Meiland, Johann Walter, Christoph Demantius and Bartholomäus Gesius. These performances were conducted by Jonas Rannila.

In 2012, Musicians of the King's Road started a series of concerts that presents rare musical instruments for which works were written by many composers of the classical period. In the opening concert William Zeitler played the glass harmonica. The series continued on the Night of the Arts 2013 when Paolo Tognon, who is specialised in historical wind instruments such as bassoons and dulcians, appeared as soloist on baroque bassoon. In January 2014, when Musicians of the King's Road performed the Te Deum by Marc-Antoine Charpentier, the orchestra included a historical serpent. In the same concert, the instrument called Chinese hat was heard probably for the first time ever in Finland. Later in the same year, Sigiswald Kuijken appeared as soloist with Musicians of the King's Road on violoncello da spalla. On the Night of the Arts 2015, the instrument in focus was the lira-chitarra, played by Eleonora Vulpiani from Italy. The next instrument presented in the series was the tromba marina played by Eberhard Maldfeld from Germany. In the same concert, another rarity, the wooden timpani, could be heard for the first time in Finland. Before the break caused by the COVID-19 pandemic, the concert series featured Maija Lampela on the so-called violin for women, pardessus de viole. She was followed by the Belgian musician Marieke Van Ransbeeck, one of the few performers of the French baroque bagpipe, musette de cour. In 2023, the series featured the German musician Daniel Ahlert, whose instrument is historical Neapolitan mandolin. He was followed in 2024 by Ritva Hautsalo, who played the lirone.

== Historically Informed Performance Practice ==
Historically Informed Performance Practice (HIP) refers to an approach to performing classical music in which the performance conventions, style, and expression of a particular musical period are followed as closely as possible. Musicians of the King’s Road performs in concerts using historical period instruments or accurate replicas of such instruments. The sound of Baroque instruments is generally softer than that of their modern counterparts, and these instruments also require more frequent and longer tuning, including during concerts. Unlike many other ensembles today, Musicians of the King’s Road uses only traditional printed sheet music in rehearsals and concerts. Music is not performed from electronic devices such as iPads or other tablet computers.

== Acknowledgements ==
Musicians of the King's Road was chosen the regionally most significant cultural project in 2010 by the Finnish Cultural Foundation, Varsinais-Suomi regional fund. The Pro Musica Säätiö foundation that supports performers of classical music in Finland awarded Musicians of the King's Road a grant in 2012. In 2017, Musicians of the King’s Road was awarded the Mikael Agricola 2007 Jubilee medal by the Mikael Agricola Society for the cycle of historical passion settings performed as a part of the Reformation anniversary festivities.

== Publicity ==
Musicians of the King's Road gives concerts regularly but has not made any recordings. It mainly performs in concerts that are its own productions and its publicity approach also includes not appearing with videos on YouTube. The Finnish Broadcasting Company Yle has broadcast several of its concerts.

== Turku Night of the Arts festival ==
Musicians of the King’s Road was responsible for coordinating the official programme of the Night of the Arts festival in Turku in 2016–2026. The event celebrated its 30th anniversary in 2019.
