= Étienne Ficquet =

French engraver (1719–1794)

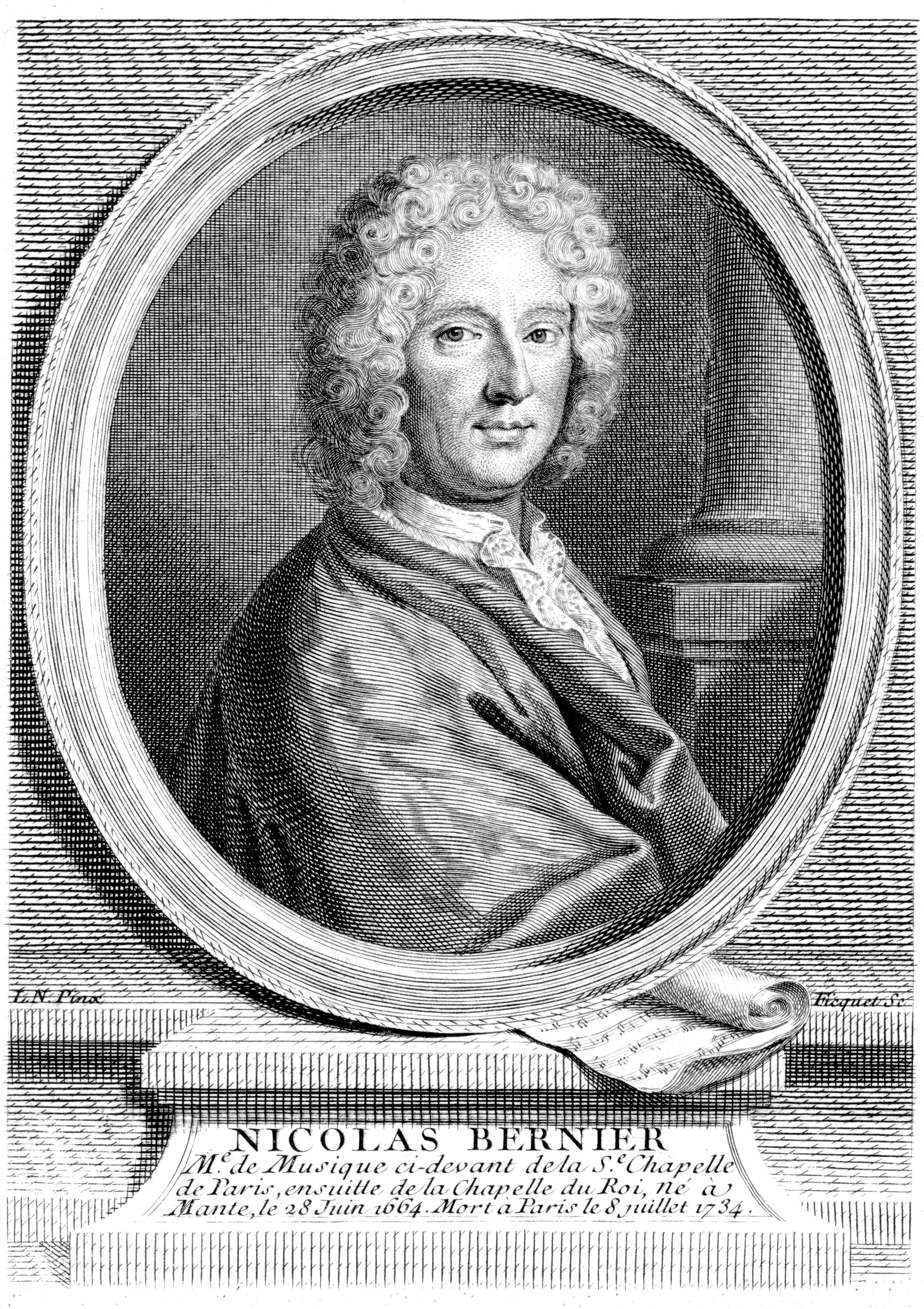
Nicolas Bernier

Étienne Ficquet (13 September 1719 – 11 December 1794) was a French engraver.

Ficquet was born in Paris in 1719, and was instructed by G. F. Schmidt and Le Bas. He acquired great reputation by a set of small portraits which he engraved of distinguished literary characters of France. They are executed with extraordinary neatness and delicacy, and are very correctly drawn. One of his best plates is a portrait of Madame de Maintenon, after Mignard, now become very scarce. He engraved also several of the plates for Descamps' Vie des Peintres Flamands et Hollandais, of which those of Rubens and Van Dyck are very highly finished. He died in Paris in 1794.

== Works ==
- Françoise d'Aubigné; after P. Mignard.
- J. de La Fontaine; after Rigaud.
- J. F. Regnard; after the same.
- J. J. Rousseau; after De La Tour. 1763.
- F. M. Arouet de Voltaire; after the same. 1762.
- Pierre Corneille; after Le Brun.
- J. de Crébillon; after Aved.
- J. B. P. de Molière; after Coypel.
- René Descartes; after F. Hals.
- M. Montaigne; after Dumonstier. 1772.
- De La Mothe Le Vayer; after Nanteuil.
- F. de La Mothe Fénélon; after Vivien.
- J. J . Vadé; after Richard.
- P. P. Rubens; after Van Dyck.
- Anton Van Dyck; after the same.
