= François Cosset =

French composer

François Cosset (Picardy, c. 1610 - c. 1673) was a French composer. His works include 8 masses, 4 of them composed at Reims in 1659.

== Bibliography ==
- Yolande de Brossard, La collection Sébastien de Brossard 1655-1730. Catalogue.. Paris, BNF, 1994, XXV-539 pages, ISBN 9782717718331
- Charles Cerf, « La musique dans l’église de Reims », Travaux de l’Académie nationale de Reims 84/2(1890), p. 415-437.
- François-Léon Chartier, L’ancien chapitre de Notre-Dame de Paris et sa maîtrise. Paris, 1897.
- Georges Durand, « La musique de la cathédrale d’Amiens avant la Révolution », Bulletin de la Société des antiquaires de Picardie, 1920–21 (1922), p. 329–457; repr. in La vie musicale dans les provinces françaises (Genève, 1971).
- Catalogue de la bibliothèque de F.-J. Fétis acquise par l'État Belge. Bruxelles, Librairie européenne C. Muquardt, 1877.
- Charles Gomart, Notes historiques sur la maîtrise de Saint-Quentin et sur les célébrités musicales de cette ville. Saint-Quentin, 1851.
- Laurent Guillo : Pierre I Ballard et Robert III Ballard : imprimeurs du roy pour la musique (1599–1673). Liège : Mardaga et Versailles : CMBV, 2003. 2 vol. ISBN 2-87009-810-3.
- Denise Launay, La musique religieuse en France du concile de Trente à 1804. Paris, 1993.
- J. Leflon, Henri Hardouin et la musique du chapitre de Reims au XVIIIe siècle. Reims, 1933.
- Anne-Marie Yvon-Briand, La vie musicale à Notre-Dame de Paris aux XVIIe et XVIIIe siècles. Thèse de l'École des Chartes, Paris, 1949, 2 vol.
- Jean-Paul C. Montagnier, The Polyphonic Mass in France, 1600-1780: The Evidence of the Printed Choirbooks. Cambridge: Cambridge University Press, 2017.

== Sources ==
- Jean-Paul C. Montagnier, The Polyphonic Mass in France, 1600-1780: The Evidence of the Printed Choirbooks. Cambridge: Cambridge University Press, 2017.
