= Marcel Lagorce =

French classical trumpeter (1932–2023)

Antoine Marcel Lagorce (14 June 1932 – 11 May 2023) was a French classical trumpeter.

== Biography ==
Born in Ussel (Corrèze), Lagorce was admitted in September 1951 to the Conservatoire de Paris, where he met Maurice André.

Lagorce won a first prize for cornet in 1954 then a first prize for trumpet in 1955.

In 1956, he joined the French Republican Guard Band. From 1957 to 1967 he was solo trumpeter with the Symphony Radio Orchestra, which became the Philharmonic Orchestra of the ORTF. From 1967 to 1993 he was solo trumpeter with the Orchestre de Paris.

Lagorce was a member of the brass quintet Ars Nova founded in 1964 by Georges Barboteu (French horn) with Bernard Jeannoutot (trumpet), Camille Verdier (trombone) and Elie Raynaud (tuba).

In 1976 he took over as Maurice André's interim teacher at the Conservatoire de Paris, and taught there until 1988. He provided an open teaching of the cornet and trumpet. Among his students, the most famous are Frédéric Mellardi (principal trumpet of the Orchestre de Paris), Pascal Vigneron (professor at the École Normale de Musique de Paris), Hervé Noel Professor at the Royal Conservatory of Brussels, Michel Barre, André Chpélitch and Marc Bauer (principal trumpet of the Orchestre National de France).

From 1994, he was a member of the Harmonie municipale de Limoges, where he first played the horn and then the tuba.

Lagorce was responsible for several publications and methods for learning the trumpet that are widely used today in conservatories and music schools.

Lagorce died on 11 May 2023, at the age of 90.

== Discography ==
Lagorce had a game very close to his friend Maurice André. The two men were friends, thus whenever Maurice André needed a second trumpet with him, Lagorce was usually there.

So it was naturally for the Erato record label that Lagorce worked. He is present in many orchestral and concertos pieces alongside Maurice André, with Jean-François Paillard's chamber orchestra. Several of these recordings have won the Grand Prix du Disque and remain a reference: the suites of J S Bach, Handel's Water Music, Vivaldi's Concerto for Two Trumpets.

In total, Lagorce has participated in more than 60 recordings.
