= Claudin de Sermisy =

French composer (c. 1490 – 1562)

Claudin de Sermisy (c. 1490 – 13 October 1562) was a French composer of the Renaissance. Along with Clément Janequin he was one of the most renowned composers of French chansons in the early 16th century; in addition he was a significant composer of sacred music. His music was both influential on, and influenced by, contemporary Italian styles.

== Biography ==
Sermisy was most likely born either in Picardy, Burgundy, or Île-de-France, based on the similarity of his surname to place names there. Sometime in his early life he may have studied with Josquin des Prez, if Pierre de Ronsard is to be believed, but many musicologists consider the claim unreliable; at any rate he absorbed some of the older composer's musical ideas either early, or later, as he became acquainted with his music. Josquin was possibly at the French court between 1501 and about 1503, though this has never been definitely established, so a master-pupil relationship would have been possible then; Sermisy's whereabouts before 1508 are not known, but his presence at the Royal Chapel was certainly possible.

In 1508 the young Sermisy was appointed as a singer in the Royal Chapel of Louis XII, where he was also a cleric. His birthdate is inferred from the date he joined the royal chapel; 18 was about the right age for such an appointment. In 1515 he went to Italy with Francis I, and in 1520 he was part of the musical festivities arranged by Francis I and Henry VIII of England at the Field of the Cloth of Gold, directed by Jean Mouton, where he was almost certainly a singer. He may have been a composer of some of the music there as well. In 1532 he also participated in the similar meeting between the kings at Boulogne, for which he wrote a ceremonial motet.

For a while in the early 1520s Sermisy was a canon at Notre-Dame-de-la-Rotonde in Rouen, but he left there in 1524 to take a similar position in Amiens. By 1532 he was music director of the Royal Chapel, still under Francis I, who reigned until 1547. At this post he was expected to teach and care for the boys of the choir, as well as find talented singers to recruit. In 1533, in addition to his post at the Royal Chapel, he became a canon of the Sainte-Chapelle, which would have required him to live in Paris. He acquired a large house there, large enough to shelter refugees from the church in St Quentin when the Spanish sacked their city in 1559. In 1554 he also was given a prebend at Ste Catherine in Troyes. Few biographical details are available about his last years, but he seems to have been active as a composer up to the end of his life based on publication dates of works. He was buried in the Sainte-Chapelle.

== Works ==
=== Sacred music ===
Sermisy wrote both sacred music and secular music, and all of it is for voices. Of his sacred music, 12 complete masses have survived, including a Requiem mass, as well as approximately 100 motets, some magnificats and a set of Lamentations. Unlike many of his contemporaries writing sacred music in France, there is no evidence he had any Huguenot sympathies; he seemed to remain a faithful Catholic all his life.

His interest in the sacred genres increased steadily throughout his life, corresponding to a decline in interest in secular forms, using the publication dates as a guide (actual dates of compositions are extremely difficult to establish for composers of this period, unless a work happened to be composed for a specific occasion). Since the prevailing style of polyphony among contemporary composers during his late career was dense, seamless, with pervasive imitation, as typified in the music of Mouton and Gombert, it is significant that he tended to avoid this style, preferring clearer textures and short phrases: a style more akin to the chansons he wrote earlier in his career. In addition he varied the texture in his composition by alternating polyphonic passages with homorhythmic, chordal ones, much like the texture found in his secular music.

Sermisy wrote two of the few polyphonic settings of the Passion found in French music of the period; the musical setting is simple, compared to his masses and motets, and he strove to make the words clearly understandable. The gospels chosen were those of St. Matthew and St. John. Sermisy's settings were published in the 10th volume of Motets published by Pierre Attaignant.

=== Chansons ===
By far Sermisy's most famous contribution to music literature is his output of chansons, of which there are approximately 175. They are similar to those of Janequin, although less programmatic; his style in these works has also been described as more graceful and polished than that of the rival composer. Typically Sermisy's chansons are chordal and syllabic, shunning the more ostentatious polyphony of composers from the Netherlands, striving for lightness and grace instead. Sermisy was fond of quick repeated notes, which give the texture an overall lightness and dance-like quality. Another stylistic trait seen in many of Sermisy's chansons is an initial rhythmic figure consisting of long-short-short (minim-crotchet-crotchet, or half-quarter-quarter), a figure which was to become the defining characteristic of the canzona later in the century.

The texts Sermisy chose were usually from contemporary poets, such as Clément Marot (he set more verse by Marot than any other composer). Typical topics were unrequited love, nature, and drinking. Several of his songs are on the topic of an unhappy young woman stuck with an unattractive and unvirile old man, a sentiment not unique to his age.

Most of his chansons are for four voices, though he wrote some for three early in his career, before four-voice writing became the norm. Influence from the Italian frottola is evident, and Sermisy's chansons themselves influenced Italian composers, since his music was reprinted numerous times both in France and in other parts of Europe.

== Influence ==
Sermisy was well known throughout western Europe, and copies of his music are found in Italy, Spain, Portugal, England and elsewhere. Rabelais mentioned him in Gargantua and Pantagruel (Book 4) along with several other contemporary composers. Sermisy's music was transcribed numerous times for instruments, including viols and lute as well as organ and other keyboard instruments, by performers from Italy, Germany, and Poland in addition to France. Even though Sermisy was a Catholic, many of his tunes were appropriated by Protestant musicians in the next generation: even a Lutheran chorale tune ("Was mein Gott will, das g'scheh allzeit") is based on a chanson by Sermisy (Il me suffit de tous mes maulx).

== Compositions ==
=== Chansons ===
- Au joly boys
- Aupres de vous secretement (two parts)
- C'est une dure departie
- Changeons propos, c'est trop chante d'amours
- Content desir, qui cause ma douleur
- Dont vient cela (#10 in Attaingnant, P.: 37 Chansons musicales a quatre parties, nd)
- En entrant en ung jardin (publ. 1529)
- Je ne menge point de porc
- Languir me fais
- Si mon malheur my continue
- Si vous m'aimez
- Tant que vivray (publ. 1527)
- Tu disais que j'en mourrais
- Vignon, vignon, vignon, vignette
- Vive la serpe

=== Motets ===
- Aspice, Domine

== Sources and further reading ==
- Isabelle Cazeaux, "Claudin de Sermisy", The New Grove Dictionary of Music and Musicians, ed. Stanley Sadie. 20 vol. London, Macmillan Publishers Ltd., 1980. ISBN 1-56159-174-2
- Gustave Reese, Music in the Renaissance. New York, W.W. Norton & Co., 1954. ISBN 0-393-09530-4

== Media ==
Tant que vivray for Organ

En entrant en ung jardin
