= Louis-Joseph Marchand (musician) =

French music theorist, composer, choir director and priest

Louis-Joseph Marchand (1 January 1692, Troyes — 20 November 1774) was a French music theorist, composer, choir director, and priest.

== Life and career ==
Born in Troyes, Louis-Joseph Marchand studied singing in Bourges and Auxerre. He became a priest in the Roman Catholic Diocese of Troyes. He first served as the 'maître de musique' at the Châlons Cathedral, before taking up a similar position at the Besançon Cathedral. He left the latter post in August 1735 to head the maîtrise (a term used in France to refer collectively to a position of responsibility over the choristers, their living quarters, and other associated responsibilities) at the Collegiate Church of St Maxe at Bar-le-Duc; a position he held until his retirement 32 years later. He also concurrently held the position of canon at the Notre-Dame Cathedral in 1764–1765. After retiring in 1767, he returned to Troyes where he lived until his death on November 20, 1774.

Marchand authored the first work on counterpoint published in France in the 18th century: Traité du contrepoint simple, ou Chant sur le livre (published 1739 by Richard Briflot in Bar-le-Duc). His theories were conservative, and did not agree with the more progressive theories proposed by Jean-Philippe Rameau. The work heavily influenced composer and theorist Henry Madin who in turn published Traité de contrepoint simple (Paris, 1742) after being inspired by Marchand. Only one work composed by Marchand survives, the choral work Missa quatuor vocibus, cui titulus, Quis, ut Deus? (Paris, 1743).
