= Antoine Tisné =

French composer

Antoine Tisné (29 July 1932 – 19 July 1998) was a French composer.

== Life ==
Antoine Tisné was born in Lourdes on 29 July 1932. He began his musical studies at the Ecole nationale de musique de Tarbes before transferring to the Conservatoire de Paris (CP) in 1952. At the CP he studied music composition with Darius Milhaud, Jean Rivier, and André Jolivet. He was also a student of Georges Hugon in harmony and Noël Gallon and Jean Rivier in fugue and counterpoint. He won a Second Grand Prix de Rome in 1962. He was principal music inspector at the Ministry of Cultural Affairs between 1967 and 1992, and then appointed music inspector in charge of the municipal conservatories of the City of Paris.

Tisné composed more than three hundred works ranging from pieces for solo instrument to the symphony orchestra. His works were recorded in France by MFA, REM and Calliope. He was an Officer of the National Order of Merit, a Commandeur of the Ordre des Arts et des Lettres and was decorated with the Ordre des Palmes académiques.

Among other awards, he has received the Copley Foundation Prize, the Helphen Prize, the Lili Boulanger Prize, the Koussevitsky Foundation Prize, the Casa de Velázquez Prize, the Grand Prix musical de la Ville de Paris, the Composers' Prize of the SACEM.

Tisné died in Paris in 1998.

== Works ==
- Sonata for piano (1968)
- Épigraphe pour une stèle for piano (1968)
- Soliloques for bassoon solo (1968)
- Concerto for flute and string orchestra (1969)
- Hommage à Calder (1970)
- Stabile Mobile (1970)
- Luminescences for organ (1970)
- Solstices for bassoon and string orchestra (1973)
- Sonata for violin and piano (1973)
- Alliages (1974)
- Osiriaques (1975)
- Héraldiques for trumpet and piano (1975)
- Music for Stonehenge for alto saxophone and piano (1977)
- Espaces irradiés for alto saxophone and piano (1983)
- Bucéphale for 2 pianos and narrator (1984)
- Musique en trio for violin, cello and piano (1984)
- Après... for clarinet (1984)
- Concerto for viola and orchestra (1985)
- Ombra Veneziana for 2 guitars (1985)
- Soleils Noirs for piano (1986)
- Espaces irradiés (1987)
- Antienne pour l'au-delà : Baryton, violon solo et orchestre à cordes (1986)
- Horizons for clarinet and viola (1987)
- Vision des temps immémoriaux (1987)
- Trio pour Ondes Martenot Piano Percussion
- Ragas - Hommage à René Daumal (1987)
- Trio pour Ondes Martenot Piano Percussion avec récitante (1987)
- Épisodes New-Yorkais for flute, clarinet, violin, cello and piano (1988)
- Monodie IV pour un espace sacré for flute solo (1989)
- Sonata for viola and piano (1989)
- Partita for flute solo (1990)
- Les Voiles de la nuit, premiered by the Orchestre symphonique français conducted by Laurent Petitgirard (1992)
- Conte opera : les enfants du ciel
- Conte opera : le chemin des bulles
