= Guillaume-Antoine Calvière =

French musician and composer

Organist, Notre-Dame de Paris cathedral
- In office 1730–1755
- Preceded by: Médéric Corneille
- Succeeded by: Armand-Louis Couperin

Personal details
- Born: 1685
- Died: 1755 (aged 69–70)
- Citizenship: French
- Profession: Organist

Guillaume-Antoine Calvière (1695 - 18 April 1755) was a virtuoso French musician and composer who was for many years organist of the Cathedral of Notre-Dame de Paris.

== Early years ==
Guillaume-Antoine Calvière was born in Paris around 1695, the son of Rodolphe Calvière and Jeanne Boundin. He was a pupil of Philippe Isoré de La Fontaine, who spent his whole career until his death in 1733 as organist of Saint-Denis. Calvière was gifted and precocious, and made his first public performance at the age of eleven. Calvière's younger sister Cécile Louise Calvière, born in 1703, was also an organist.

== Celebrity ==
Calvière became organist of Saint-Germain-des-Prés in 1722, and in 1730 succeeded Maderic Corneille as organist at Notre Dame. He became a national celebrity, and the Mercure published verses in his praise. He held the prestigious posts of organist of the Cathedral of Notre-Dame de Paris from 1730 until his death 1755, and of the Royal Chapel from 1738. Calvière was appointed organist of Sainte-Chapelle in succession to Pierre Février, holding this position from 1739 until his death. He was also organist at Sainte-Marguerite. For six months in 1754 he trained Jean-Baptiste Nôtre, who then became organist of the Toul Cathedral for more than half a century.

== Work ==
Calvière was an admirer of François Couperin. His work included motets and pieces for organ. His Te Deum mimicked the sounds of wind and thunder. But apart from a short piece preserved in the library of the Brussels Conservatory, almost nothing has survived. After his death his widow gave his manuscripts to Louis-Claude Daquin for editing and publication. Daquin, his friend, colleague and also rival, neglected to do so. In fairness, Daquin failed to publish many of his own works.
