= Louis-Claude Daquin =

French composer (1694–1772)

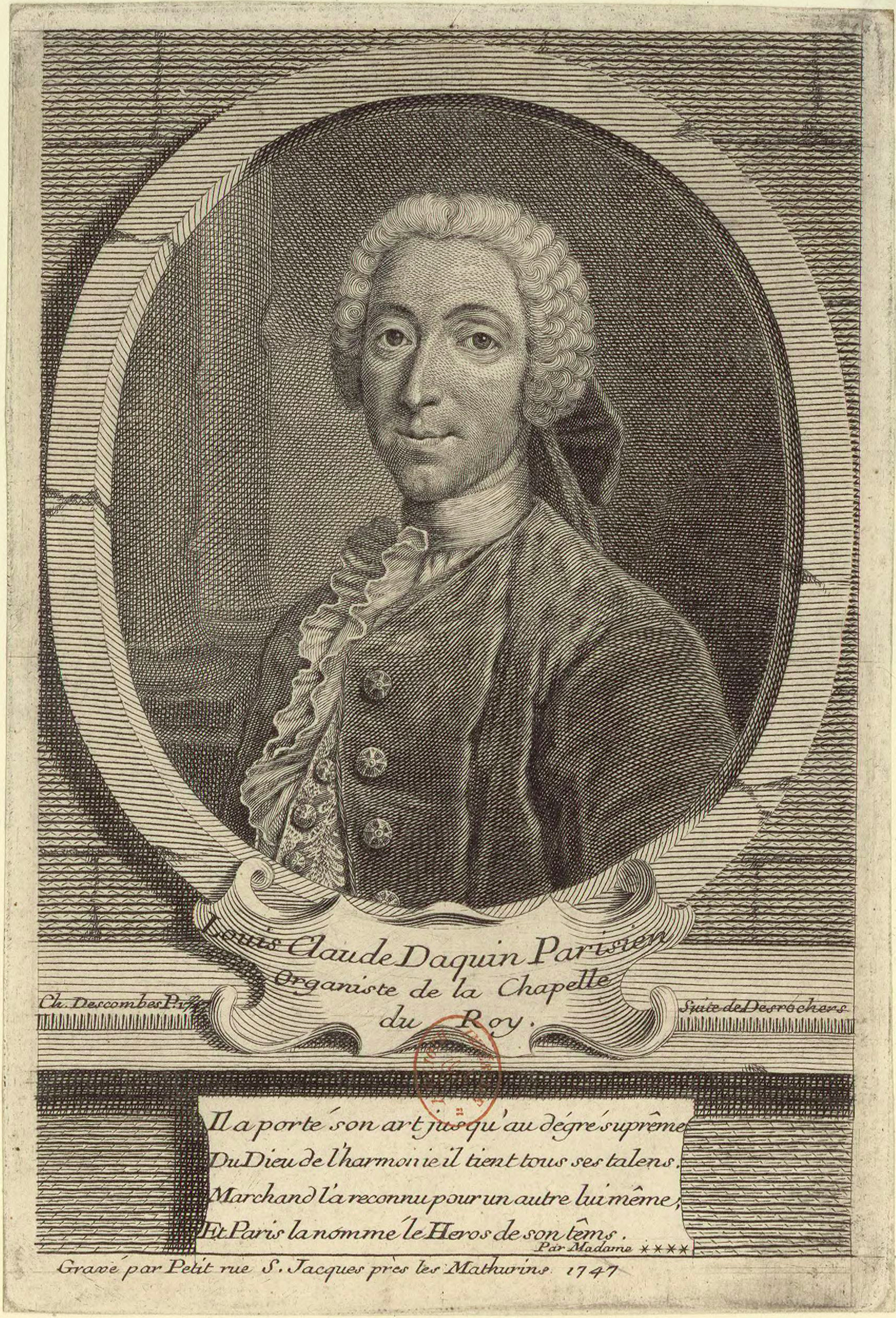
Louis-Claude Daquin

Louis-Claude Daquin (French pronunciation: [lwi klod dakɛ̃]; or D'Aquino, d'Aquin, d'Acquin; July 4, 1694 – June 15, 1772) was a French composer, writing in the Baroque and Galant styles. He was a virtuoso organist and harpsichordist.

== Life ==
Louis-Claude Daquin was born in Paris to a family originating from Italy, where his great-great-grandfather took the name D'Aquino after converting from Judaism to Catholicism in the town of Aquino. Louis-Claude's parents were Claude Daquin, a painter, and Anne Tiersant, a grand-niece of Rabelais. One of Louis-Claude's grand-uncles was a professor of Hebrew at the Collège de France, and another was the principal physician of King Louis XIV.

Daquin was a musical child prodigy. He performed for the court of Louis XIV at the age of six. He was for a while a pupil of Louis Marchand. At the age of 12, he became organist at the Sainte-Chapelle, and in the following year took a similar post at the Church of Petit Saint Antoine. In 1722 he married Denise-Thérèse Quirot.

Louis-Claude Daquin never lacked for work as an organist. In 1727 he was appointed organist at the Church of Saint Paul in Paris, ahead of Jean-Philippe Rameau who was also a candidate. Five years later, Daquin succeeded his teacher Marchand as organist at the Church of the Cordeliers. In 1739 he became organist to Louis XV at the Chapelle Royale. In 1755 he was made titular organist at Notre-Dame Cathedral, succeeding Guillaume-Antoine Calvière.

By reputation a dazzling performer at the keyboard, Daquin was courted by the aristocracy, and his great expertise at the organ drew large crowds to hear him. He was known for his "unfaltering precision and evenness" at both the harpsichord and organ.

== Compositions ==
At the age of eight, he conducted his own choral work Beatus Vir.

Daquin's surviving music includes four harpsichord suites, the c.1757 Nouveau livre de noëls for organ and harpsichord (settings of Christmas carols, which include some of his harpsichord improvisations), a cantata, an air à boire, and manuscripts of two Masses, a Te Deum, a Miserere, and Leçons de Ténèbres. Among the most famous of his works are the Swiss Noël (Noël Suisse, No. XII from his Nouveau livre) and The Cuckoo (Le coucou, from his 1735 harpsichord suite, Pièces de clavecin, Troisième Suite).

Among technical innovations, his Trois cadences for harpsichord contains a triple trill.

=== The Noëls ===
For Daquin's twelve published Noëls, French organist Jean-Claude Duval has sourced the following old texts:

1. Noel, sur les jeux d'Anches sans tremblant: «À la venuë de Noël»
2. Noel, en dialogue, Duo, Trio, sur le cornet de récit, les tierces du positif et la pédalle de Flûte: «Or nous dites Marie»
3. Noel en Musette, en Dialogue, et en Duo: «Une bergère jolie»
4. Noel en Duo, sur les jeux d'Anches, sans tremblant: «Noël, cette journée»
5. Noel en Duo: «Je me suis levé» or «Ô jour glorieux»
6. Noel, sur les jeux d'Anches, sans tremblant, et en Duo: «Qu'Adam fut un pauvre homme»
7. Noel, en Trio et en Dialogue, le cornet de récit de la main droitte, la Tierce du Positif de la main gauche: «Chrétiens qui suivez l'Église»
8. Noel Étranger, sur les jeux d'anches sans tremblant et en Duo: «?» (foreign carol, perhaps Italian)
9. Noel, sur les Flûtes: «Noël pour l'amour de Marie» and «Chantons, je vous prie»
10. Noel, Grand jeu et Duo: «Quand Dieu naquit à Noël» or «Bon Joseph, écoutez-moi»
11. Noel, en Récit en Taille, sur la Tierce du Positif, avec la Pédalle de Flûte, et en Duo: «Une jeune Pucelle»
12. Noel Suisse, Grand jeu, et Duo: «Il est un p'tit l'ange» or «Ô Dieu de clémence»

=== Media ===
Noël No. X

Le Coucou

== Discography ==
- Louis Claude Daquin, l'œuvre intégrale pour orgue / Louis Claude Daquin, Complete organ works. Marina Tchebourkina at the Great Organ of the Royal Chapel of the Palace of Versailles. — Natives, 2004. (EAN 13 : 3760075340049)
