= Charles-Hubert Gervais =

French composer (1671–1744)

Charles-Hubert Gervais (19 February 1671 – 14 January 1744) was a French composer of the Baroque era. The son of a valet to King Louis XIV's brother, Monsieur, Gervais was born at the Palais Royal in Paris and probably educated by Monsieur's musical intendants, Jean Granouillet de Sablières and Charles Lalouette. He worked as a musician for the Duc de Chartres, the future regent of France. In 1701, he married Françoise du Vivier (she died in 1723). In 1721 he was named sous-maître de musique at the Chapelle royale along with André Campra, Nicolas Bernier and Michel Richard Delalande (who had previously held the post alone). Gervais composed sacred music, 42 grand motets, 7 petits motets, cantatas, and operas, including two tragédies en musique.

== Works ==
=== Operas ===
- Idille sur le retour du duc de Chartres (1692)
- Méduse (tragédie en musique, 1697)
- Divertissement de Fontainebleau (1698, attributed to Gervais)
- Hypermnestre (tragédie en musique, 1716)
- Les amours de Protée (opéra-ballet, 1720)
- Divertissement de Villers-Cotterêts (1722)

== Discography ==
- Grand motet - Te Deum, Chorale des Jeunesses Musicales de France, Orchestre Des Jeunesses Musicales De France, conducted by Louis Martini. Vinyl LP 1958
- Grand motet - Exaudiat te Dominus, Chorale des Jeunesses Musicales de France, Orchestre de l'association des Concerts Pasdeloup, conducted by Louis Martini. Vinyl LP 1958
- Hypermnestre, Purcell Choir, Orfeo Orchestra, Katherine Watson, Mathias Vidal, Thomas Dolié, Philippe-Nicolas Martin, Chantal Santon-Jeffery, Juliette Mars, Manuel Munez Camelino, conducted by György Vashegyi. 2 CD Glossa 2019. 5 Diapasons
- Grands motets - Exaudi Deus, O filii et filiae, Judica me Deus, Uquequo Domine, Te Deum, Purcell Choir, Orfeo Orchestra, conducted by György Vashegyi. CD Glossa 2022. 5 Diapasons
- Grands motets - Jubilate Deo, Super flumina Babylonis, Miserere, Choeur du Concert Spirituel, Les Ombres, conducted by Sylvain Sartre. CD CVS 2022. 5 Diapasons

== Sources ==
- Charles-Hubert Gervais, Super flumina Babilonis. Edited by Jean-Paul C. Montagnier. "Recent Researches in the Music of the Baroque Era" no. 84. Madison, WI: A.R. Editions, Inc., 1998.
- Charles-Hubert Gervais, Miserere. Ed. Jean-Paul C. Montagnier. Stuttgart: Carus-Verlag, 2004
- Jean-Paul C. Montagnier,"Charles-Hubert Gervais’s Psiché burlesque and the Birth of the Comic Cantate française," The Journal of Musicology 17 (1999): 520–545.
- Jean-Paul C. Montagnier,Charles-Hubert Gervais (1671-1744), un musicien au service du Régent et de Louis XV. Paris: CNRS Editions, 2001.
- Jean-Paul C. Montagnier, "Les deux versions du cinquième acte d'Hypermnestre de Charles-Hubert Gervais", Revue de musicologie, 82 (1996), pp. 331–343.
- Jean-Paul C. Montagnier, "Claude Boyer librettiste: remarques sur Méduse,” Revue d’histoire du théâtre 191 (1996), pp. 303–320.

== See also ==
- List of French composers
