= Esprit Antoine Blanchard =

French baroque composer

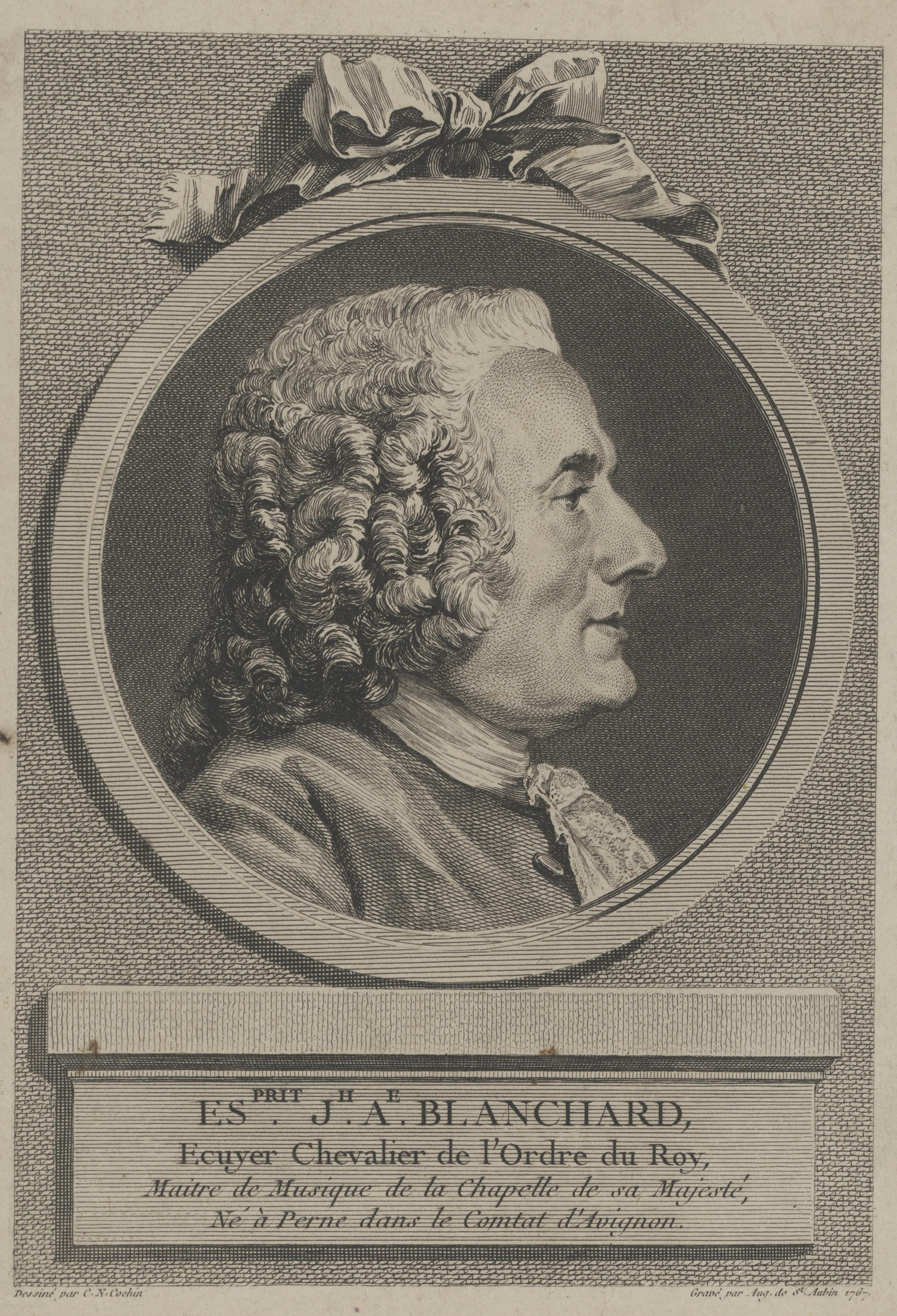
Esprit-Joseph-Antoine Blanchard

Esprit-Joseph-Antoine Blanchard (29 February 1696 – 19 April 1770) was a French baroque composer, a contemporary of Jean-Philippe Rameau, regarded as a representative composer of religious music in eighteenth-century France.

Blanchard was born at Pernes in the County of Avignon in 1696. His father was a physician. He was a choirboy at the Cathedral of Aix-en-Provence. He died, aged 74, at Versailles.

== Works, editions and recordings ==
- Eleven of his grands motets were published by Marc-François Bêche, a highly esteemed singer of the Chapelle Royale, who had sung under Blanchard when he performed during the king's mass at Versailles.
- Te Deum first performed on 26 October 1744 for the recovery of the king from the Alsace campaign, but rededicated on 12 May 1745 for the victory at the Battle of Fontenoy in 1745 as Cantique d'action de grâces pour les conquêtes de Louis XV.
- In Exitu Israël composed in April 1749 for the Chapelle Royale and given again at the Concert Spirituel in 1763. Restored in 2003 by Michel Lefèvre and recorded 2004 by his Ensemble Jubilate de Versailles.
- 46 Motets conserved at the Bibliothèque Nationale.
