= Pierre Moulu =

Franco-Flemish composer

Pierre Moulu (1484? – c. 1550) was a Franco-Flemish composer of the Renaissance who was active in France, probably in Paris.

== Life ==
Little is known of his life, but internal evidence in his compositions indicates he was probably at the French royal chapel during the first two decades of the 16th century, at least, and was also associated with the cathedral in Meaux, on the Marne east of Paris. He composed music for ceremonial occasions, for example a sombre lament for the death of Queen Anne of Brittany (1514), and he also composed a motet which lists all the composers which he considered to be the most celebrated in France, arranged chronologically, and ending with Josquin. Documents from the Vatican (1505–1513) help establish his identity, as they indicate that a "Petrus Moulu" held various clerical positions at Meaux Cathedral. He may have written his mass Stephane gloriose, for the cathedral of St Etienne (Saint Stephen) in this town.

== Music ==
Moulu's music was clearly influenced by Josquin, but no documentary evidence survives to substantiate Pierre de Ronsard's claim that he studied with Josquin. The motet Anxiatus est in me spiritus meus which laments Queen Anne's death is modeled on a similar, and much more famous composition by Josquin for the death of Ockeghem, La Déploration sur la mort Ockeghem. Moulu's music shows the style of pervasive imitation and smooth polyphony with exactly equal voices which was prevalent in the generation after Josquin (well exemplified by, and perhaps most famous in, the music of Nicolas Gombert).

Of Moulu's music, five masses survive, the most famous being his mass on the Marian antiphon Alma Redemptoris Mater, which can be sung in two different manners: with or without rests longer than a quarter. The latest discovery is the mass Paranymphus, based on a motet by Loyset Compère. In addition to the masses, Moulu wrote motets and chansons, some of which are of doubtful authorship (Mouton and Josquin are also suggested as the composer for several of these pieces).

=== Masses ===
1. Missa Alma Redemptoris mater, 4vv
2. Missa Missus est Gabriel angelus (based on the motet by Josquin), 4vv
3. Missa Mittit ad virginem, 4vv
4. Missa Paranymphus (based on the motet by Compère), 4vv
5. Missa Stephane gloriose, 4vv

=== Motets ===
1. Adest nobis dies laetitiae, 4vv;
2. Alleluia, Regem ascendentem, 4vv;
3. Domine Dominus noster, 4vv; (by Mouton)
4. Fiere attropos, 5vv;
5. Induta est caro mea, 4vv;
6. In hoc ego sperabo, 3vv;
7. In illo tempore, 4vv; (probably by Mouton)
8. In omni tribulatione, 4vv; (by Mouton)
9. In pace, 5vv;
10. Mater floreat florescat, 4vv;
11. Ne projicias, 6vv;
12. Oculi omnium, 3vv;
13. O dulcis amica Dei, 5vv;
14. Oremus pro conctis, 4vv;
15. Quam dilecta, 3vv;
16. Quam pulchra es 4vv; (also attributed to Mouton)
17. Regina caeli, 4vv;
18. Salve Barbara martyr, 7vv;
19. Salve regina Barbara, 4vv;
20. Sancta Maria, Dei mater, 4vv; (only alt-voice)
21. Saule, Saule, quid me persequeris, 4vv; (by Jean le Brung)
22. Sicut malus, 3vv;
23. Tu licet (same as the 'Crucifixus' from the Missa Alma Redemptoris mater), 2vv;
24. Virgo carens criminibus, 4vv; (by Andreas de Silva)
25. Vivo ego, 3vv;
26. Vulnerasti cor meum, 5vv.

=== Chansons ===
1. Amy souffrez, 3vv; (by Heinrich Isaac)
2. Au bois, au bois, madame, 4vv;
3. En despit des faux mesdisans, 6vv;
4. Et dout venès vous, 3vv;
5. Hellas, hellas madame, 4vv;
6. J'ay mis mon cueur, 7vv; (probably by Descaudain)
7. La rousée de moys de may, 6vv; (by Mouton)
8. N'aymés jamais ces gens, 3vv;
9. Voicy le may, 4vv.

In addition some works of Moulu have survived without text. For example, as late as 1592, an untexted 3-voice canon appears in Lodovico Zacconi's Prattica de musica under the name 'Pietro Molu'. This canon already appeared in 1503, printed by Petrucci, so Moulu's attribution is very unlikely.

== Recordings ==
- Capilla Flamenca, The A-La-Mi-Re Manuscripts, Flemish Polyphonic Treasures for Charles V. Naxos CD 8.554744. Contains the motet Mater floreat florescat.
- The Brabant Ensemble, Stephen Rice (conductor), Missa Alma redemptoris & Missus est Gabriel, Hyperion Records, Hyperion CDA 67761

== References and further reading ==
- J.G. Chapman, The Works of Pierre Moulu: a Stylistic Analysis. Ph.D. dissertation, New York University, 1964.
- Article "Pierre Moulu," in The New Grove Dictionary of Music and Musicians, ed. Stanley Sadie. 20 vol. London, Macmillan Publishers Ltd., 1980. ISBN 1-56159-174-2
- Gustave Reese, Music in the Renaissance. New York, W.W. Norton & Co., 1954. ISBN 0-393-09530-4
- Jan Jaap Zwitser, De Missa Paranymphus, een onbekende mis van Pierre Moulu?. Doctoraalscriptie Universiteit Utrecht, 2002.
- Howard Mayer Brown/Richard Freedman: "Pierre Moulu", Grove Music Online, ed. L. Macy (Accessed March 29, 2007), (subscription access)
- Moulu: Missa Alma redemptoris & Missus est Gabriel, Hyperion Records, (Hyperion CDA 67761)
