= Marc-Antoine Charpentier =

French composer (1643–1704)

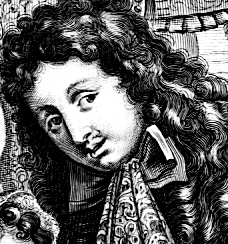
- An engraving from the 1682 Almanach Royal thought to be of Charpentier
- Born: 1643; France
- Died: 24 February 1704 (aged 60–61); Paris, France
- Occupation: Composer

Marc-Antoine Charpentier (French: [maʁk ɑ̃twan ʃaʁpɑ̃tje]; 1643 – 24 February 1704) was a French Baroque composer during the reign of Louis XIV. One of his most famous works is the prelude of his Te Deum H.146, Marche en rondeau, which has been used as the theme song fanfare before television broadcasts of the Eurovision Network since the inception of the European Broadcasting Union in 1954.

Marc-Antoine Charpentier dominated the Baroque musical scene in seventeenth century France because of the quality of his prolific output. He mastered all genres, and his skill in writing sacred vocal music was especially hailed by his contemporaries.

He began his career by going to Italy, where he fell under the influence of Giacomo Carissimi as well as other Italian composers, perhaps Domenico Mazzocchi. He would remain marked by the Italian style and become the only one with Jean-Joseph Cassanéa de Mondonville in France to approach the oratorio. In 1670, he became a master of music (composer and singer) in the service of the Duchess of Guise. From 1690 Charpentier composed Médée, on a piece by Corneille. It was a determining failure in his career of composer: he henceforth devoted himself to religious music. He became the composer of the Carmelites of the "Rue du Bouloir", Montmartre Abbey, Abbaye-aux-Bois and Port-Royal. In 1698, Charpentier was appointed music master for the children of the Sainte-Chapelle du Palais. After having obtained from the king Louis XIV a softening of Lully's monopoly, Molière turned to Charpentier to compose the music for the intermissions of Circe and Andromeda, as well as sung scenes for the revivals of The Forced Marriage, and finally the musical pieces of The Imaginary invalid.

He composed secular works, stage music, operas, cantatas, sonatas, symphonies, as well as sacred music, motets (large or small), oratorios, masses, psalms, Magnificats, Litanies.

At the time of his death, Charpentier's complete works must have numbered about 800 opus numbers, but today only 28 autograph volumes remain, or more than 500 pieces that he himself took care to classify. This collection, called Mélanges, is one of the most comprehensive sets of musical autograph manuscripts of all time.

== Biography ==
Charpentier was born in or near Paris, the son of a master scribe who had very good connections to influential families in the Parlement of Paris. Marc-Antoine received a very good education, perhaps with the help of the Jesuits, and registered for law school in Paris when he was eighteen. He withdrew after one semester. He spent "two or three years" in Rome, probably between 1667 and 1669, and studied with Giacomo Carissimi. He is also known to have been in contact with poet-musician Charles Coypeau d'Assoucy, who was composing for the French Embassy in Rome. A legend claims that Charpentier initially traveled to Rome to study painting before he was discovered by Carissimi. This story is undocumented and possibly untrue; at any rate, although his 28 volumes of autograph manuscripts reveal considerable skill at tracing the arabesques used by professional scribes, they contain not a single drawing, not even a rudimentary sketch. Regardless, he acquired a solid knowledge of contemporary Italian musical practice and brought it back to France.

Immediately on his return to France, Charpentier probably began working as house composer to Marie de Lorraine, duchesse de Guise, who was known familiarly as "Mlle de Guise." She gave him an "apartment" in the recently renovated Hôtel de Guise – strong evidence that Charpentier was not a paid domestic who slept in a small room in the vast residence, but was instead a courtier who occupied one of the new apartments in the stable wing.

For the next seventeen years, Charpentier composed a considerable quantity of vocal works for her, among them Psalm settings, hymns, motets, a Magnificat setting, a mass and a Dies Irae for the funeral of her nephew Louis Joseph, Duke of Guise, and a succession of Italianate oratorios set to non-liturgical Latin texts. (Charpentier preferred the Latin canticum to the Italian term, oratorio). Throughout the 1670s, the bulk of these works were for trios. The usual trio was two women and a singing bass, plus two treble instruments and continuo; but when performance in the chapel of a male monastic community required male voices, he would write for an haute-contre, a tenor and a bass, plus the same instruments. Then, about 1680, Mlle de Guise increased the size of the ensemble, until it included 13 performers and a singing teacher. In the pieces written from 1684 until late 1687, the names of the Guise musicians appear as marginalia in Charpentier's manuscripts – including "Charp" beside the haute-contre line. Étienne Loulié, the senior instrumentalist who played keyboard, recorder and viol, probably was entrusted with coaching the newer instrumentalists.

Despite what is often asserted, during his seventeen years in the service of Mlle de Guise, Charpentier was not the "director" of the Guise ensemble. The director was a gentleman of Mlle de Guise's court, an amateur musician, Italophile, and Latinist named Philippe Goibaut, familiarly called Monsieur Du Bois. Owing to Mlle de Guise's love for Italian music (a passion she shared with Du Bois), and her frequent entertaining of Italians passing through Paris, there was little reason for Charpentier to conceal the Italianisms he had learned in Rome.

During his years of service to Mlle de Guise, Charpentier also composed for "Mme de Guise", Louis XIV's first cousin. It was in large part owing to Mme de Guise's protection that the Guise musicians were permitted to perform Charpentier's chamber operas in defiance of the monopoly held by Jean Baptiste Lully. Most of the operas and pastorales in French, which date from 1684 to 1687, appear to have been commissioned by Mme de Guise for performance at court entertainments during the winter season; but Mlle de Guise doubtlessly included them in the entertainments she sponsored several times a week in her palatial Parisian residence.

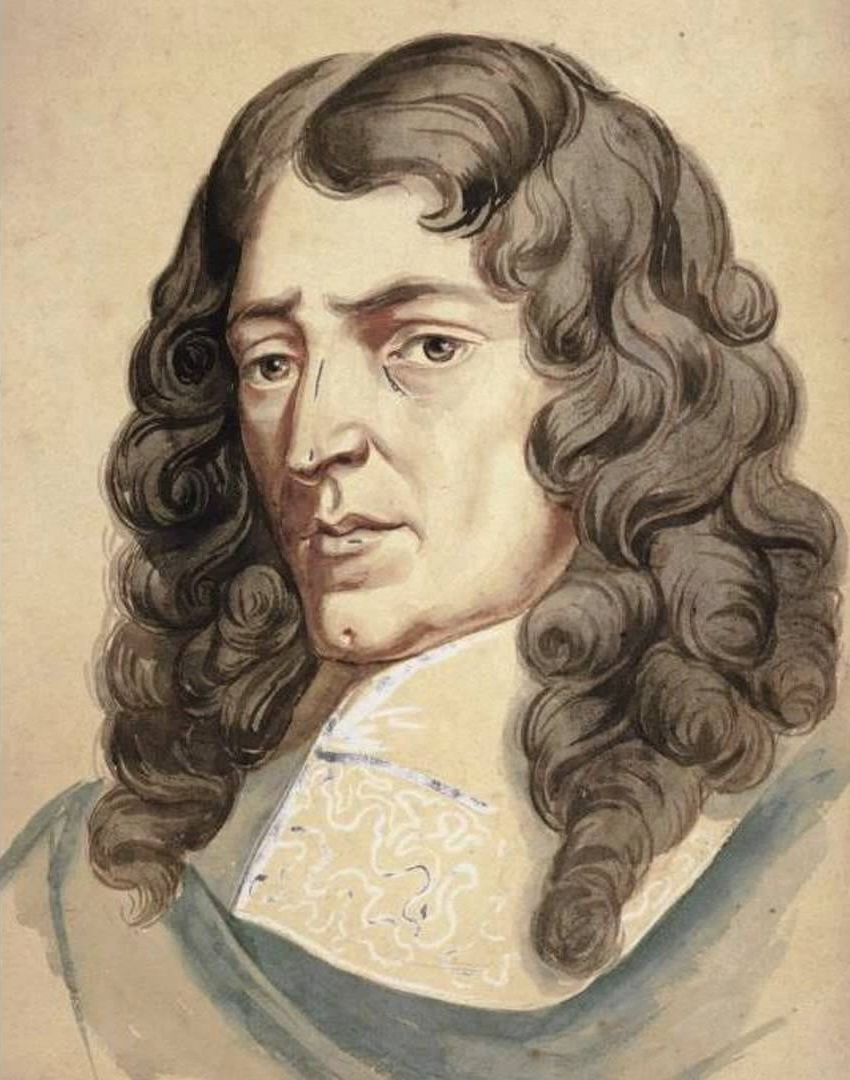
A recently discovered portrait, inscribed by the artist as representing Charpentier, but dating circa 1750, about 40 years after his death.

By late 1687, Mlle de Guise was dying. Around that time, Charpentier entered the employ of the Jesuits. Indeed, he is not named in the princess's will of March 1688, nor in the papers of her estate, which is strong evidence that she had already rewarded her loyal servant and approved of his departure.

During his seventeen-odd years at the Hôtel de Guise, Charpentier had written almost as many pages of music for outside commissions as he had for Mlle de Guise. (He routinely copied these outside commissions in notebooks with Roman numerals.) For example, after Molière's falling out with Jean-Baptiste Lully in 1672, Charpentier had begun writing incidental music for the spoken theater of Molière. It probably was owing to pressure on Molière exerted by Mlle de Guise and by young Mme de Guise that the playwright took the commission for incidental music for Le Malade imaginaire away from Dassoucy and gave it to Charpentier. After Molière's death in 1673, Charpentier continued to write for the playwright's successors, Thomas Corneille and Jean Donneau de Visé. Play after play, he would compose pieces that demanded more musicians than the number authorized by Lully's monopoly over theatrical music. By 1685, the troop ceased flouting these restrictions. Their capitulation ended Charpentier's career as a composer for the spoken theater.

In 1679, Charpentier had been singled out to compose for Louis XIV's son, the Dauphin. Writing primarily for the prince's private chapel, he composed devotional pieces for a small ensemble composed of royal musicians: the two Pièche sisters singing with a bass named Frizon, and instruments played by the two Pièche brothers. In short, an ensemble that, with Mlle de Guise's permission, could perform works he had earlier composed for the Guises. By early 1683, when he was awarded a royal pension, Charpentier was being commissioned to write for court events such as the annual Corpus Christi procession. In April of that year, he became so ill that he had to withdraw from the competition for the sub-mastership of the royal chapel. Speculations that he withdrew because he knew he would not win seem disproved by his autograph notebooks: he wrote nothing at all from April through mid-August of that year, strong evidence that he was too ill to work.

From late 1687 to early 1698, Charpentier served as maître de musique (music master) to the Jesuits, working first for their collège of Louis-le-Grand (for which he wrote Celse martyr, David et Jonathas and where he was still employed in April 1691) and then for the church of Saint-Louis adjacent to the order's professed house on the rue Saint-Antoine. Once he moved to Saint-Louis, Charpentier virtually ceased writing oratorios and instead primarily wrote musical settings of psalms and other liturgical texts such as the Litanies of Loreto. During his years at Saint-Louis, his works tended to be for large ensembles that included paid singers from the Royal Opera. In addition, during these years Charpentier succeeded Étienne Loulié as music teacher to Philippe, Duke of Chartres.

Charpentier was appointed maître de musique for the Sainte-Chapelle in Paris in 1698, a royal post he held until his death in 1704. One of his most famous compositions during his tenure was the Mass Assumpta Est Maria (H.11). That this work survived suggests that it was written for another entity, an entity that was entitled to call upon the musicians of the Chapel and reward them for their efforts. Indeed, virtually none of Charpentier's compositions from 1690 to 1704 have survived, because when the maître de musique died, the royal administration routinely confiscated everything he had written for the Chapel. Charpentier died at Sainte-Chapelle, Paris, and was buried in the little walled-in cemetery just behind the choir of the chapel. (The cemetery no longer exists.)

In 1727, Charpentier's heirs sold his autograph manuscripts (28 folio volumes) to the Royal Library, today the Bibliothèque nationale de France. Commonly known as the Mélanges, or Meslanges, and now available as facsimiles published by Minkoff-France, these manuscripts were divided by Charpentier himself into two series of notebooks – one bearing Arabic numbers and the other Roman numbers, and each notebook numbered chronologically. These manuscripts (and their watermarks) have permitted scholars not only to date his compositions but also to determine the events for which many of these works were written.

== Music, style and influence ==
His compositions include oratorios, masses, operas, leçons de ténèbres, motets and numerous smaller pieces that are difficult to categorize. Many of his smaller works for one or two voices and instruments resemble the Italian cantata of the time, and share most features except for the name: Charpentier calls them airs sérieux or airs à boire if they are in French, but cantata if they are in Italian.

Not only did Charpentier compose during that "transitory period" so important to the "evolution of musical language, where the modality of the ancients and the emerging tonal harmony coexisted and mutually enriched one another" (Catherine Cessac, Marc-Antoine Charpentier, 2004 edition, p. 464), but he also was a respected theoretician. In the early 1680s he was analyzing the harmony in a polychoral mass by the Roman composer Francesco Beretta (Bibliothèque nationale de France, Ms. Réserve VM1 260, fol. 55–56). About 1691 he wrote a manual to be used for the musical training of Philippe d'Orléans, duke of Chartres; and about 1693 he expanded this manual. The two versions survive as copies in the hand of Étienne Loulié, Charpentier's colleague, who called them Règles de Composition par Monsieur Charpentier and Augmentations tirées de l'original de Mr le duc de Chartres (Bibliothèque nationale de France, ms. n.a. fr. 6355, fols. 1–16). On a blank page of the Augmentations, Loulié in addition listed some of the points that Charpentier made in a treatise that Loulié called Règles de l'accompagnement de Mr Charpentier. Three theoretical works long known to scholars exist, but did not reveal much about Charpentier's evolution as a theoretician. Then, in November 2009, a fourth treatise, this time in Charpentier's own hand, was identified in the collection of the Lilly Library at Indiana University, Bloomington, U.S.A. Written during the final months of 1698 and numbered "XLI," this treatise appears to have been the forty-first in a series hitherto not imagined by Charpentier scholars, a series of theoretical treatises that spans almost two decades, from the early 1680s to 1698.

== Modern significance ==
The prelude to his Te Deum, H.146, a rondo, is the signature tune for the European Broadcasting Union, heard in the opening credits of Eurovision events. This theme was also the introductory music to The Olympiad films of Bud Greenspan.

Charpentier's Psaume "Super Flumina Babylonis"
After Psalm 137; live recording (excerpt)

== Writings ==
- Remarques sur les messes à 16 parties d'Italie, H.549
- Règles de composition par Mr Charpentier, H.550
- Abrégé des règles de l'accompagnement de Mr Charpentier, H.551

== Recordings ==
The complete discography regularly updated, is available on the CMBV website.

== Tributes ==
The asteroid discovered in May 1997 by Paul G. Comba at the Prescott Observatory in Arizona, US has been called 9445 Charpentier (1997 JA8) by NASA.

Thierry Pécou : Le Tombeau de Marc-Antoine Charpentier, pour 3 chœurs à voix égales, orgue baroque, basse de viole, positif et cloches (1995)

Philippe Hersant : Le Cantique des 3 enfants dans la fournaise (1995), poem by Antoine Godeau, in front of La Messe à 4 Choeurs H.4 by Marc-Antoine Charpentier with same chorus and orchestra. (CD Radio France 2019)

== Bibliography ==
=== Biography ===
- Saint-Saëns, Camille, Au courant de la vie, Un contemporain de Lully, chapitre 1, édition Dorbon-Ainé 1914, report édition Wentworth Press, Scholar sélect 2018.
- Crussard, Claude (1893–1947), Un musicien français oublié, Marc-Antoine Charpentier, 1634–1704, Paris, Librairie Floury, 1945.
- Lowe, Robert W, Marc-Antoine Charpentier et l'opéra de collège, Paris, G.-P. Maisonneuve et Larose, 1966, 195 p.
- Cessac, Catherine. Marc-Antoine Charpentier. Translated from the French ed. (Paris 1988) by E. Thomas Glasow. Portland (Oregon): Amadeus Press, 1995.
- Cessac, Catherine, ed., Marc-Antoine Charpentier, un musicien retrouvé (Sprimont: Mardaga, 2005), a collection of pioneering works originally disseminated in the Bulletin Charpentier, 1989–2003. The bulk of the articles deal with his life and works: his family and its origins, Italy and Italianism at the Hôtel de Guise, his work for the Jesuits, the sale of his manuscripts, plus background information about specific works.
- Cessac, Catherine, ed., Les Manuscrits autographes de Marc-Antoine Charpentier (Wavre: Mardaga, n.d.), papers presented at the conference held at Versailles, 2004. The articles in this volume focus primarily on what scholars can deduce from the 28 autograph volumes that contain his compositions.
- Ranum, Patricia M. "A Sweet Servitude: A musician's life at the court of Mlle de Guise," Early Music, 15 (1987), pp. 347–60.
- Ranum, Patricia M. "Lully Plays Deaf: Rereading the Evidence on his Privilege," in John Hajdu Heyer, ed., Lully Studies (Cambridge, UK: Cambridge University Press, 2000), pp. 15–31, which focuses on Charpentier's powerful contacts.
- Ranum, Patricia M. (2004). Portraits Around Marc-Antoine Charpentier. Baltimore: Dux Femina Facti. ISBN 978-0-9660997-3-7. Archived from the original on 15 May 2009.

=== Music history and theory ===
- Anthony, James R. (1997). French baroque music from Beaujoyeulx to Rameau. Portland, Ore.: Amadeus Press. ISBN 1-57467-021-2. OCLC 35298622.
- Hitchcock, H. Wiley (1982). Les œuvres de Marc-Antoine Charpentier : catalogue raisonné = The works of Marc-Antoine Charpentier (in French). Paris: Picard. ISBN 2-7084-0084-3. OCLC 9683157.
- Lasocki, David; Charpentier, Marc-Antoine (2018). Marc-Antoine Charpentier and the flûte recorder or traverso?. Portland, Oregon: Instant Harmony. ISBN 978-1-5483-0374-7. OCLC 1162813991.
- Thomas, Downing A. (2002). Aesthetics of opera in the Ancien Régime, 1647-1785. Cambridge: Cambridge University Press. ISBN 0-521-80188-5. OCLC 49530155.
- Tunley, David (1997). The eighteenth century French cantata. Oxford [England]: Clarendon Press. ISBN 0-19-816439-4. OCLC 35559214.
- Thompson, Shirley (2010). New perspectives on Marc-Antoine Charpentier. Farnham, Surrey, England: Ashgate. ISBN 978-0-7546-6579-3. OCLC 319318911.
- Cessac, Catherine; Ranum, Patricia M. (2016). Les Histoires sacrées de Marc-Antoine Charpentier : origines, contextes, langage, interprétation : hommage à Patricia M. Ranum (in French). Turnhout, Belgium: Brepols. ISBN 978-2-503-56968-0. OCLC 962330865.
