= Nicolas Formé =

French composer

Nicolas Formé (Paris 26 April 1567 – 27 May 1638) was a French composer.

In 1587, aged 20, Formé joined the choir of the Sainte-Chapelle, but was excluded from the fraternity for drunkenness and womanising. He was reinstated in 1592, to the Chapelle royale, and then finally, with the support of King Louis XIII, in 1626 he returned to the Sainte-Chapelle as a canon, where he worked under the protection of the King until his death.

Formé paid no attention to publishing his works and all his secular works are lost. The sacred works which survive were preserved in the private archive of the French crown. These include:

- Motet Ecce tu pulchra es (Ballard, Paris, 1638)
- Eight settings of the Magnificat in eight modes
- Mass for double choir
