= Jean-Paul C. Montagnier =

French musicologist

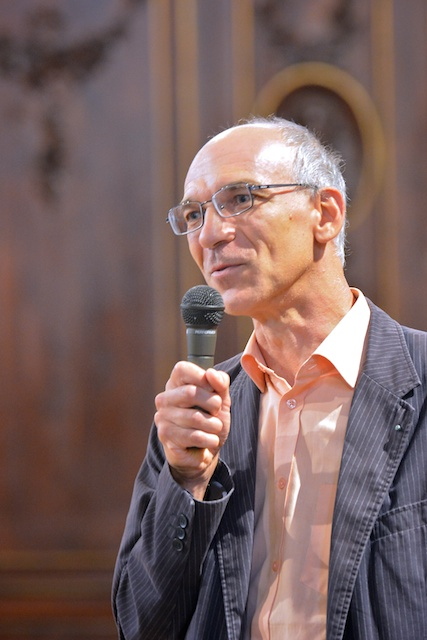
Jean-Paul C. Montagnier lecturing at the Morez Parish Church (France), 16 August 2015

Jean-Paul C. Montagnier (born September 28, 1965, at Lyon) is a French musicologist. He studied at the Conservatoire de Paris, where he received two first prizes in musical analysis (1988, professor: Claude Ballif) and music history (1989, professors: Yves Gérard, and Bernard Gagnepain), before completing a PhD at Duke University under the supervision of Professor Peter Williams (1994). He is currently Professor of musicology at the University of Lorraine (Nancy, France), and Associate Member of the Institut de Recherche en Musicologie (CNRS). He also was adjunct professor at McGill University (2007–2017). He was involved with Musica Gallica, an edition of the works of the musical patrimony of France (2000–2017). He was the secretary of the research program "Musical Life in Europe, 1600-1900: Circulation, Institutions, Representation" supported by the European Science Foundation (1998–2002), and the secretary (1994–2004), then the editor (2004) of the Revue de musicologie. He was a member of the editorial board of Eighteenth-Century Music published by Cambridge University Press (2002–2013). He currently serves on the editorial board of the Collected Works of Jean-Baptiste Lully published by Olms (Germany), and on the editorial board of the Revue belge de musicologie. He was made Officer in the Order of Arts and Letters by the French Government in 2012, and Chevalier in the Ordre National du Mérite in 2021. He was nominated to become a Robert M. Trotter Visiting Distinguished Professor at the University of Oregon School of Music and Dance during the 2018–2019 academic year.

He specializes in the sacred music of the French Baroque, and has extensively published in numerous international journals. In addition to several books and book chapters, he has also edited many scores and facsimiles. He is regularly invited to lecture and teach in North-American and European universities.

He is a member of several learned societies, among which the American Musicological Society, the Royal Musical Association, and the International Musicological Society.

His grandfather, Georges Montagnier (1892–1967), was a novelist, playwright and poet.

== Books ==
- La vie et l’œuvre de Louis-Claude Daquin (1694-1772). Lyon: Aléas Editeur, 1992. ISBN 2-908016-18-4.
- Un mécène-musicien: Philippe d’Orléans, Régent (1674-1723). Paris: Éditions Auguste Zurfluh, 1996. ISBN 2-87750-076-4.
- Charles-Hubert Gervais (1671-1744), un musicien au service du Régent et de Louis XV. Paris: CNRS Editions, 2001. ISBN 2-271-05879-1.
- Henry Madin, Louis-Joseph Marchand: traités de contrepoint simple ou de chant sur le livre. Ed. J.-P. C. Montagnier. Paris: Société française de musicologie, 2004. ISBN 2-85357-014-2.
- Henry Madin (1698-1748), un musicien Lorrain au service de Louis XV. Preface by Davitt Moroney. Langres: Editions Dominique Guéniot, 2008. ISBN 978-2-87825-412-9.
- Nicolas Bernier: Principes de composition, fac-similé du manuscrit Rés. Vmb ms. 2 de la Bibliothèque nationale de France. Ed. J.-P. C. Montagnier. Langres: Editions Dominique Guéniot, 2009. ISBN 978-2-87825-449-5.
- Georges Montagnier, Œuvres complètes. Ed. J.-P. C. Montagnier. Nancy, Langres: J.-P. C. and Ph. Montagnier, 2011. ISBN 978-2-87825-494-5.
- Georges Montagnier (1892-1967). Un écrivain lyonnais de l'entre-deux-guerres. Ed. J.-P. C. Montagnier. Nancy: J.-P. C. and Ph. Montagnier, 2013. ISBN 978-2-9545458-0-6.
- The Polyphonic Mass in France, 1600-1780. The Evidence of the Printed Choirbooks. Cambridge: Cambridge University Press, 2017. ISBN 978-1-107-17774-1.
- Catalogue des œuvres de Jules-Marie Laure Maugüé (Nancy, 1869–Paris, 1953) et autres documents sur sa vie et son œuvre. Nancy: The Author, 2019. ISBN 978-2-9545458-1-3.
- Julie Reisserová (1888-1938): Czech Composer and Feminist. Cambridge: Cambridge University Press, 2025, ISBN 978-1-009-51736-2.

== Selection of Articles ==
- "The Problems of ‘Reduced Scores’ and Performing Forces at the Chapelle Royale of Versailles during the Tenure of Henry Madin (1738–1748)," The Journal of Musicological Research, 18 (1998), p. 63-93.
- "Charles-Hubert Gervais’s Psiché burlesque and the Birth of the Comic Cantate française," The Journal of Musicology, 17/4 (1999), p. 520-545.
- "Heavenly Dissonances: the Cadential 6/4 Chord in French Grands Motets and Rameau's Theory of the Accord par supposition," Journal of Music Theory, 47/2 (2003), p. 305-323.
- "Chanter Dieu en la Chapelle Royale: le grand motet et ses supports littéraires," Revue de musicologie, 86 (2000), p. 220-263.
- "La messe polyphonique imprimée en France au XVIIIe siècle: survivance et décadence d’une tradition séculaire," Acta musicologica, 77 (2005), p. 47-69.
- "Catholic Church Music in France," in The Cambridge History of Eighteenth-Century Music, ed. Simon Keefe. Cambridge: Cambridge University Press, 2009, p. 113-126.
- "'Plain-chant dégeneré' et fleuretis: quelle musique pour quelle prière?," Acta musicologica, 83 (2011), p. 223-243.
- "Französische Sonderformen, 1600 bis ca. 1730," and "Französische Sonderformen, ca. 1730 bis 1800," in Enzyklopädie der Kirchenmusik, ed. Wolfgang Bretschneider, Günther Massenkeil, and Matthias Schneider. Vol. 2, Geschichte der Kirchenmusik, ed. Wolfgang Hochstein, and Christoph Krummacher. Laaber: Laaber-Verlag, 2012, p. 105-109, 287–291.
- "Un motet, deux auteurs, un copiste: les Cantate Domino ChG.36 et HM.12 de Charles-Hubert Gervais et Henry Madin," Revue de musicologie, 97 (2011), p. 329-360.
- "France," in Mozart in Context, ed. Simon Keefe. Cambridge: Cambridge University Press, 2019, p. 114-121.
- "The War of The Austrian Succession and the Masses by Henry Madin (1741-1748)," Music & Letters, 100 (August 2019), p. 391-419.
- "Autour de la Pastorale maritimo de Julie Reisserová (1888-1938)," Revue belge de musicologie, 74 (2020), p. 143-166.
- "Nicolas Bernier's 'Principe de composition' and the Italian Partimento Tradition," Early Music, 49 (February 2021), p. 87-99.
- "Julie Reisserová (1888-1938): A Czech Woman Composer of Importance," in It’s a Man’s World? Künstlerinnen in Europas Musik-Metropolen des frühen 20. Jahrhunderts, ed. Kaï Hinrich Müller, and Sabine Meine. Würzburg: Königshausen & Neumann GmbH, 2023, p. 157-167.
- "Bernier and Italy: Bernardo Pasquini's Partimento and Nicolas Bernier's Counterpoint," Journal of the Royal Musical Association, 151/1 (2026), p. 123-146.

== Selected Scholarly Editions ==
- Charles-Hubert Gervais, Super flumina Babilonis. Ed. J.-P. C. Montagnier. “Recent Researches in the Music of the Baroque Era,” 84. Madison, WI: A.R. Editions, Inc., 1998.
- André Campra, Messe de mort. Ed. J.-P. C. Montagnier. London: Ernst Eulenburg, 2002.
- Pierre Tabart, Œuvres complètes. Ed. J.-P. C. Montagnier. Versailles: Centre de musique baroque de Versailles, 2002.
- Henry Madin, Les Messes. Ed. J.-P. C. Montagnier. Versailles: Centre de musique baroque de Versailles, 2003.
- Charles-Hubert Gervais, Miserere. Ed. J.-P. C. Montagnier. Stuttgart: Carus-Verlag, 2004.
- Claude Debussy, Prélude à l’après-midi d’un faune. Ed. J.-P. C. Montagnier. London: Ernst Eulenburg, 2007.
- Jean-Philippe Rameau, Les Cantates. Ed. J.-P. C. Montagnier. Rameau Opera Omnia III.1. Paris, Cassel: Société Jean-Philippe Rameau, Bärenreiter, 2008.
- Paul Dukas, L'Apprenti sorcier. Ed. J.-P. C. Montagnier. London: Ernst Eulenburg, 2014.
- André Campra, De profundis. Ed. J.-P. C. Montagnier. Stuttgart: Carus-Verlag, 2015.
- Jean-Baptiste Lully, Dies iræ, Benedictus, Miserere. Œuvres complètes Lully. Ed. J.-P. C. Montagnier. Hildesheim: George Olms, 2017.
- Julie Reisserová, Œuvres pour orchestre / Orchestral Works [Suita and Pastorale maritimo]. Ed. J.-P. C. Montagnier. Berlin: Ries & Erler, 2022.
- Julie Reisserová, Březen. Version pour orchestre / Orchestral Version. Ed. J.-P. C. Montagnier. Berlin: Ries & Erler, 2023.
- Julie Reisserová, Musique de chambre / Chamber Music. Ed. J.-P. C. Montagnier. Berlin: Ries & Erler, 2023.
