= A Sei Voci =

French vocal group

The ensemble A Sei Voci was a French vocal group founded in 1977 and which ceased in 2011.

The group originally was formed by Rachid Safir, Bernard Fabre-Garrus, Régis Oudot, Bernard Dehont, Gael de Kerret, Alain Zaepffel, and Philippe Balloy dedicated primarily to renaissance music and baroque music. In 1991, it restructured around Bernard Fabre-Garrus (d.2006) and four singers: Thierry Bréhu, James Gowings, Raoul Le Chenadec and director Bernard Fabre-Garrus. It was awarded Ensemble vocal de l'année at the Victoires de la musique classique in 1994.

Later, the group also performed contemporary works, including those composed for it by Thierry Escaich, Guy Reibel, Michaël Levinas, Alain Bancquart, and Michel Decoust.

== Selected discography ==
- 1987 – Guillaume Costeley, Guillaume de Chastillon: Airs et chansons au temps du roy Henry. A Sei Voci LP, cassette Editions Pluriel 1987, digital re-release 2010
- 198? – Giovanni Gabrieli: Sacrae Symphonae. With Les Saqueboutiers de Toulouse. LP Adda, re-issued CD Accord 472,351.
- 198? – Salve regina – Musiques festives mariales du grégorien au 17e siècle Giovanni Croce, Dufay and other composers. With Jean Boyer A Sei Voci. LP Adda 198?, re-issued CD Accord 1999
- 198? – Guillaume Costeley: Musicque LP 198?, CD Erato Records 1999
- 1982 – Carlo Gesualdo: Tenebrae Responsories. Benedictus. Miserere. Erato 97411, Warner Classics 2564 62782, Apex.
- 1985 – L'Art Sacre de Josquin Des Pres. Forlane 16552.
- 1992 – Elzéar Genet, dit Carpentras: Lamentations du Prophéte Jérémie. Erato "MusiFrance" 2292-45021.
- 1993 – Charles D'Helfer: Requiem, messe de funérailles des ducs de Lorraine A sei voci La Psallette de Lorraine. Les Sacqueboutiers de Toulouse Astrée 1994, reissued Naïve 2010
- 1993 – Josquin Desprez: Vol.1 Missa Ave maris stella. Motets à la Vierge. Astrée 8507.
- 1994 – Gregorio Allegri: Miserere a 9. Missa Vidi Turbam Magnam. De ore prudentis Repleti sunt omnes. Cantate domino. Miserere. Astrée E 8524.
- 1995 – Josquin Desprez: Vol.2 Missa De beata Virgine. Motets à la Vierge. Astrée 8560.
- 1995 – Clément Janequin: Le Verger de Musique. With the viol ensemble Labyrinthes. Astrée 8571.
- 1995 – Pietro Paolo Bencini: Vesperae Beatae Virginis in Sancto Pietro Romae. Astrée 8540
- 1996 – Niccolo Jommelli: Vesperae in Sancto Petro Romae. Miserere. Astrée 8590 (2 CD).
- 1997 – Josquin Desprez: Vol.3 Missa Hercules Dux Ferrariae. Astrée E 8601.
- 1997 – Josquin Desprez: Vol.4 Missa Gaudeamus & Motets à la Vierge. Astrée E 8612.
- 1998 – Bartolomeo de Escobedo: Missa Philippus Rex Hispaniæ. With Les Sacqueboutiers de Toulouse and Choeur Philippus Rex Hispaniæ. Astrée 8640.
- 1999 – Stefano Fabri: Vesperae a quattuor Choris. Astrée 8663
- 2000 – Monteverdi: Selva Morale ed altre raccolte spirituali. Naïve Astrée 8815.
- 2000 – Pietro Paolo Bencini: Ave Maria. Missa de Oliveria. Astrée 8806
- 2000 – Josquin Desprez: Vol.5 Missa Pange Lingua & Motets. Astrée E 8639.
- 2001 – Josquin Desprez: Vol.6 Messes de l'Homme Armé. With the Maîtrise Des Pays De Loire. Astrée E 8809.
- 2003 – Ave Maria – works by Josquin Desprez, Bartholomeo de Escobedo: Naive (2003)
- 2005 – Maurizio Cazzati: Requiem Messa e Salmi per li defonti. Studio S.M. D3030

Compilation

- 1999 – Une Messe Imaginaire – works from the Astrée discography. Naive (1999)

Guest recording

- Brahms: Alto Rhapsody op. 53 Stephanie Blythe and A Sei Voci John Nelson EMI
