= Pierre Robert (composer) =

French composer

Pierre Robert (c. 1618 – 30 December 1699) was a French composer and early master of the French grand motet.

== Biography ==
Robert was educated at the boys choir, or maîtrise, of Notre Dame de Paris under the direction of Henry Frémart, Jean Francois, and Cosset Veillot before being appointed master of music at the Senlis Cathedral in 1643. In 1650, he went to the Cathedral of Chartres before returning to Senlis in March 1652. On 28 April 1653, he was appointed music master of Notre Dame de Paris, replacing Valentin de Bournonville. Robert remained ten years as head of the maîtrise.

In 1663, Louis XIV chose him with Henry Du Mont to occupy one of the four posts of Assistant Master of the Chapelle Royale. He initially filled this function in conjunction with Thomas Gobert, Gabriel Expilly and Henry Du Mont, though Gobert and Expilly resigned in 1668. Du Mont and Robert developed the grand motet, the characteristic genre of French baroque sacred music. Du Mont and Robert retired in 1682 when Louis XIV relocated the court to Versailles, and a competition was held to find four replacements among thirty five contenders; the four chosen were Michel Richard Delalande, Pascal Collasse and two minor composers Nicolas Coupillet, and Guillaume Minoret. Among those passed over were Paolo Lorenzani, Guillaume-Gabriel Nivers, Jean-Féry Rebel, Henry Desmarets and Marc-Antoine Charpentier who withdrew from the competition because of illness.

Robert died in Paris and was buried at Saint-Nicolas-des-Champs.

== Works ==
- 2 contrapuntal motets, prior to 1663: Regina Coeli (2 versions), Tristis est anima mea
- 24 grands motets for the Chapelle du roi - published in Paris by Christophe Ballard in 1684.
  - De profundis
  - Quare fremuerunt gentes
  - Te decet hymnus
  - Nisi Dominus
  - Bonum est confiteri Domine
  - Conserva me Domine
  - Veniat dilectus meus
  - Laudate Dominum
  - Exultate justi in Domino
- 10 elevations (petits motets) for the Chapelle du roi
- 3 hymns plainchant on poems of Jean Santeul for the new breviary of Paris (1680)

== Discography ==
- Pierre Robert - Grands Motets: De profundis, Quare fremuerunt gentes, Te decet hymnus, Nisi Dominus, Musica Florea, Olivier Schneebeli 2009 K617
