= Tommaso Bai =

Italian composer

Tommaso Bai, or Tommaso Baj, was born in Crevalcore around 1650 and died in Rome on 22 December 1714. He was an Italian conductor, composer, and tenor at the Vatican. He is most well known for his Miserere, which is associated with Gregorio Allegri's Miserere. During the last years of his life he had been the Kapellmeister of the Cappella Giulia in Rome.

== Biography ==
In the year of 1670, he joined the Choir of the Cappella Giulia and stayed there until his dying day. He also advanced to become a personal singer of the pope. He served the following superiors, who had been his predecessors as the Kapellmeister of the Cappella Giulia:

- Orazio Benevoli (1646–1672)
- Ercole Bernabei (1672–1674)
- Antonio Masini (1674–1678)
- Don Francesco Berretta (1678–1694)
- Paolo Lorenzani (1694–1713)

In 1713, he got to be the Kapellmeister. He kept this function until his dying day. There are different opinions about this date; for example in a music sheet of his Virgo gloriosa - owned by a person called Haberl - his date of death is claimed to be 1717. According to Baini, he died on 22 December 1714.

== Works ==
Bai was acclaimed for his intricate attention to prosody, accentuation of words, and notation. His well known Miserere, which he composed in 1713, is claimed by some opinions to be an imitation Gregorio Allegri's Miserere. According to Eitner this Miserere, that is performed during the Easter day, consists of two parts; the first part is written for 5 voices and it had been composed by Allegri and the second part written for four voices origininates of Baj [originally by Eitner 1905: Der 1. Chor zu 5 Stim., ist von Allegri und der 2. Chor zu 4 Stim. von Bai. (Capella sistina Kat. p. 50. B, B., L 24. B. Joach. Bei'lin Singak. Lübeck. Schwerin F. inkompl. Hofb. Wien 15926, 2. Musikfr. Wien. Bologna.— printed in Choron, Burney and Lugano 1840.)].

Furthermore, there exist the following compositions (quotation after Eitner):

- Miserere 4voices, performed as described above in sequence with the Miserere by Allegri (s. u.)
- Virgo gloriosa, (Haberl, privately, see above))
- Miserere 8 voc. fecit 1700. Ms. 16690
- Missa super Ut re mi fa, 5 voc. in P. — T 39 allerlei Gesge. in P. — "W. 17 Nr. 81 obige Messe in P".
- Mss. in B. M.
- 2 Messen zu 5 Stkn., 1 Miserere zu 5 Stim, and 13 Motetten zu 4 u. 5 Stim, in P.
- Missa 5 voc., Ms. 16698 Nr. 13 in Hofb. Wien
- 2 Motetten zu 4 Stim, in P: Serve bone and Dne. quando veneris, Ms. Bd. 158 in Breslau Kircheninstit.
- 1 Gesg. in alter Hds., P. in Brüssel 1854
- further pieces of mucic, printed later on.
