= Guillaume Minoret =

French composer

Guillaume Minoret (ca. April 1650 – 1717 or December 1720) was a French baroque composer.

He was of the generation of Marc-Antoine Charpentier, but unlike him only a small part of his œuvre survives. Minoret famously won one of the four rotating annual positions for sous-maîtres at the Chapelle royale in 1683, organised by Louis XIV following the retirement of Henry Du Mont and Pierre Robert. Unfortunately compared to both de Lalande, who won the most prestigious Christmas turn of the four positions, and Pascal Collasse who in most opinions came second, Minoret and his colleague Nicolas Goupillet have been consigned by music historians to the roles of musical mediocrities. Prior to the competition he had been maître de chapelle at Orléans Cathedral since 1679.

== Life ==
Minoret was born in Paris. He was possibly trained by the school of Notre-Dame de Paris, under the composer Pierre Robert. At the age of about twenty, he became master of music (maître de chapelle) at the cathédrale de Rodez, then at Saint-Sernin de Toulouse, succeeding the composer Étienne Moulinié. On 26 April 1679 he was made master of the music at the cathédrale Sainte-Croix d'Orléans, but did not stay there long and left around the start of September - his successor Pierre Tabart was installed on 9 November the same year. This provincial cathedral's music was of high quality - ten years earlier, on 14 September 1669, for the anniversary of the church's dedication, Claude Perrault (brother of the conteur), noted in his Relation du Voyage de Paris à Bordeaux "At Holy Cross [...] we heard music that was very good and which, today, is second only to that at Notre-Dame de Paris". The master was then Philippe Martinot, who was retired as too old on 14 January 1679, thus allowing Minoret to succeed him.

Orléans Cathedral was still undergoing major rebuilding work in the 17th century, after its near-total destruction on 24 March 1568 during the French Wars of Religion. It was possible to bring the apse and choir, which had survived in large part, back into use quite quickly. The slow rebuilding began under Henry IV of France on 18 April 1601. In 1679, thanks to the generosity of Louis XIV, the transepts were inaugurated - the royal effigy features on their exterior. The musical officers were probably celebrated on this occasion.

On 5 September, after leaving Orléans, Minoret was employed at the church of Saint-Germain-l'Auxerrois in Paris. In April 1683 he took part in a competition organised by Louis XIV with the aim of recruiting four sous-maîtres for the chapelle royale at the Palace of Versailles (the post of maître was held by an ecclesiastic without any musical function). With Michel Le Tellier's support, Minoret one of the four taken on (the other three were Michel-Richard Delalande, Pascal Colasse and Nicolas Goupillet). Minoret entered the role on the following 1 July. Because he was a priest, he and Nicolas Goupillet were put in charge of the education of the pages of the chapel (i.e., the young boys who sang in the choir, which was otherwise made up of professional adult men). He began by reorganising this musical chapel in summer 1683 and held the role until 1714, leaving it shortly before the king's death on 1 September 1715. Minoret himself died at Versailles some time later (exact date uncertain).

== Works, editions and recordings ==
- Six grands motets for double choir of which three are of Psalms 12 (Usquequo Domine), 27 (Ad te Domine levavi), 94 (Venite exultemus), while the three others take the texts Currite populi, Deus docuisti me, and the Prope es of Ps. 118 (Paris, BnF. Copied by André Danican Philidor, king's librarian, dated 1697);
- Two petits motets : Sancti Spiritus and Misericordia Domine for two voices and basso continuo (Lyon, Bibliothèque municipale);
- A mass for Christmastime (Missa pro tempore Nativitatis), for double choir, on Christmas themes, to which Sébastien de Brossard added two voices, in 1694 (Paris. BnF. Coll. S. de Brossard);
- A Domine salvum fac regem (God save the King), for double choir, which ended this mass

All these works are preserved in manuscript. Three of them (le Ps. 94, the Currite populi and the Prope es tu) have so far been published by the Japanese musicologist Yuriko Baba, in the collection: Edition critique - Anthologies, du Centre de musique baroque de Versailles (CMBV).

For the musicologist Jean Duron, these motets give "a good idea of this composer's style, using an elegant style and a fine yet always simple theme". In his 18th century Parnasse français, Evrard Titon du Tillet they "prove very praiseful on Minoret and notably on his manner of writing for instruments supporting the voices" (cf. Bibliographie: Jean Duron).
