= Bencini =

Bencini may refer to:

- Bencini (company), a former Italian manufacturer of cameras
- Francis Dominic Bencini (1664–1744), a Maltese philosopher
- Graham Bencini (born 1976), a Maltese professional footballer
- Pietro Paolo Bencini (ca. 1670–1755), an Italian Baroque composer
