= Miserere (Allegri) =

Setting of Psalm 51 by Gregorio Allegri

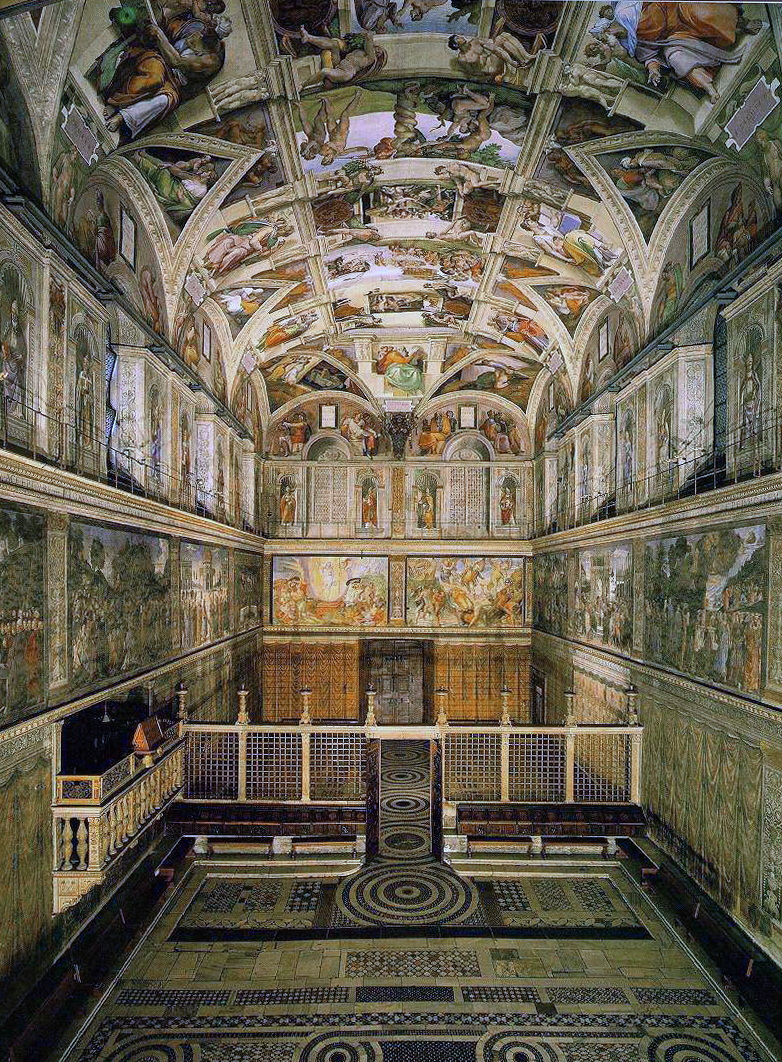
Sistine Chapel

Miserere (full title: Miserere mei, Deus, Latin for "Have mercy on me, O God") is a setting of Psalm 51 (Psalm 50 in Septuagint numbering) by Italian composer Gregorio Allegri. It was composed during the reign of Pope Urban VIII, probably during the 1630s, for the exclusive use of the Sistine Chapel during the Tenebrae services of Holy Week, and its mystique was increased by unwritten performance traditions and ornamentation. It is written for three choirs, two of five and four voices respectively, with a third choir singing plainsong responses, each singing alternately and joining to sing the ending in one of the most recognised and enduring examples of polyphony, in this case in a 9-part rendition.

== History ==
Composed around 1638, Allegri's setting of the Miserere was amongst the falsobordone settings used by the choir of the Sistine Chapel during Holy Week liturgy, a practice dating back to at least 1514. At some point, several myths surrounding the piece came to the fore, stemming probably from the fact that the Renaissance tradition of ornamentation as practised in the Sistine Chapel was virtually unknown outside of the Vatican by the time the piece became well known. This alleged secrecy is advanced by an oft repeated statement that there were only "three authorised copies outside the Vatican, held by Emperor Leopold I, the King of Portugal, and Padre Martini." However, copies of the piece were available in Rome, and it was also frequently performed elsewhere, including such places as London, where performances dating as far back as c. 1735 are documented, to the point that by the 1760s, it was considered one of the works "most usually" performed by the Academy of Ancient Music.

From the same supposed secrecy stems a popular story, backed by a letter written by Leopold Mozart to his wife on 14 April 1770, that at fourteen years of age, while visiting Rome, his son Wolfgang Amadeus Mozart first heard the piece during the Wednesday service, and later that day, wrote it down entirely from memory. (Doubt has however been cast on much of this story, as the Miserere was known in London, which Mozart had visited in 1764–65, that Mozart had seen Martini on the way to Rome, and that Leopold's letter (the only source of this story) contains several confusing and seemingly contradictory statements.) Less than three months after hearing the piece and transcribing it, Mozart had gained fame for his musical work and was summoned back to Rome by Pope Clement XIV, who showered praise on him for his feats of musical genius, and later awarded him the Chivalric Order of the Golden Spur on 4 July 1770.

The original ornamentations that made the work famous were Renaissance techniques that preceded the composition itself, and it was these techniques that were closely guarded by the Vatican. Few written sources (not even Charles Burney's) showed the ornamentation, and it was this that created the legend of the work's mystery. The Roman priest Pietro Alfieri published an edition in 1840 including ornamentation, with the intent of preserving the performance practice of the Sistine choir in both Allegri's and Tommaso Bai's (1714) settings. The work was also transcribed by Felix Mendelssohn in 1831 and Franz Liszt, and various other 18th and 19th century sources, with or without ornamentation, survive.

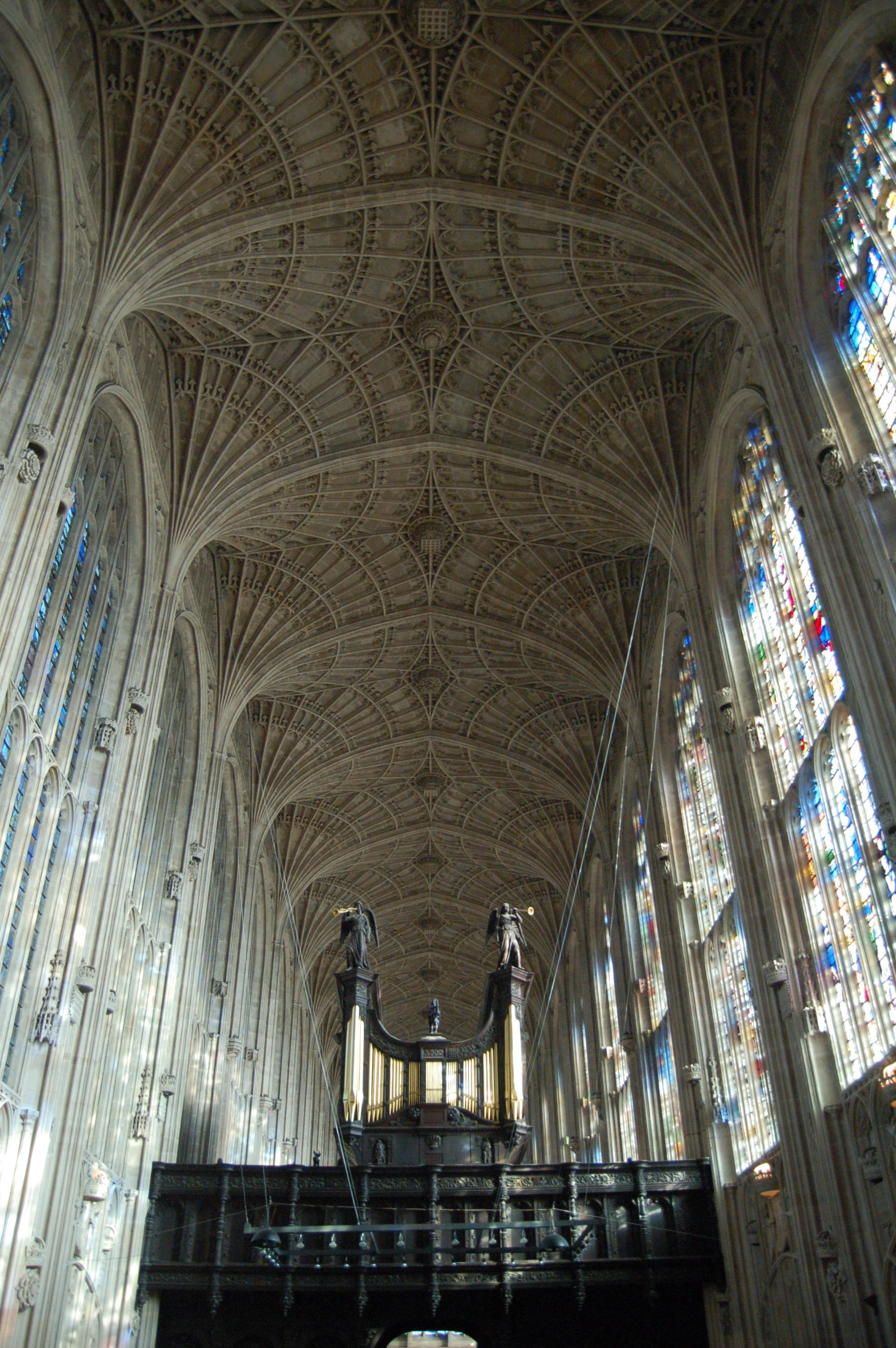
King's College Chapel, Cambridge

The version most performed today, with the famous "top C" in the second-half of the 4-voice falsobordone, is based on that published by William Smyth Rockstro in the first edition of the Grove Dictionary of Music and Musicians (1880) and later combined with the first verse of Burney's 1771 edition by Robert Haas (1932). Since this version was popularised after the publication in 1951 of Ivor Atkins' English version, with the original Latin text replaced with the translation by Miles Coverdale from the Book of Common Prayer, and a subsequent recording based upon this by the Choir of King's College, Cambridge, Allegri's Miserere has remained one of the most popular a cappella choral works performed.

== Recordings ==
The Miserere is one of the most frequently recorded pieces of late Renaissance music. An early and celebrated recording of it is the one from March 1963 by the Choir of King's College, Cambridge, conducted by David Willcocks, which was sung in English, and featured the then-treble Roy Goodman. This recording was originally part of a gramophone LP recording entitled Evensong for Ash Wednesday, but the Miserere has subsequently been re-released on various compilation discs.

In 2015, the Sistine Chapel Choir released their first CD, including the 1661 Sistine codex version of the Miserere recorded in the chapel itself.

Performances of the whole work usually last between 12 and 14 minutes.

In December 2008, BBC Four broadcast Sacred Music: The Story of Allegri's Miserere, presented by Simon Russell Beale, with a performance by The Sixteen conducted by Harry Christophers.

== Music ==
The work is set as a falsobordone, a technique then commonly used for performing psalm tones in a polyphonic manner. Allegri's setting is based upon the tonus peregrinus. Verses alternate between a five-part setting sung by the first choir (verses 1, 5, 9, 13, 17) and a four-part setting sung by the second (verses 3, 7, 11, 15, 19), interspersed with plain-chant renderings of the other verses. Both choirs come together for a nine-voice finale in verse 20. The original vocal forces for the two choirs were SATTB and SATB, but at some point in the 18th-century one of the two tenors was transposed up an octave, giving the SSATB setting which is most frequently performed today.

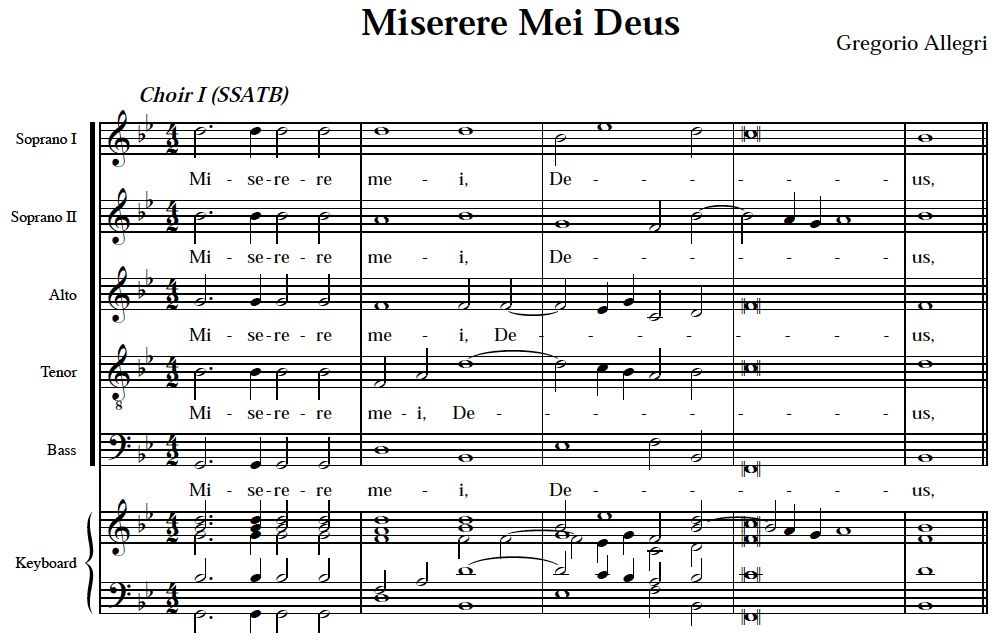
Beginning of the first verse

Miserere mei, Deus
Performed by Ensamble Escénico Vocal at the Tlaxcala City Cathedral, November 2021

== Text ==
Latin

Miserere mei, Deus: secundum magnam misericordiam tuam.
Et secundum multitudinem miserationum tuarum, dele iniquitatem meam.
Amplius lava me ab iniquitate mea: et a peccato meo munda me.
Quoniam iniquitatem meam ego cognosco: et peccatum meum contra me est semper.
Tibi soli peccavi, et malum coram te feci: ut iustificeris in sermonibus tuis, et vincas cum iudicaris.
Ecce enim in iniquitatibus conceptus sum: et in peccatis concepit me mater mea.
Ecce enim veritatem dilexisti: incerta et occulta sapientiae tuae manifestasti mihi.
Asperges me, Domine, hyssopo, et mundabor: lavabis me, et super nivem dealbabor.
Auditui meo dabis gaudium et laetitiam: et exsultabunt ossa humiliata.
Averte faciem tuam a peccatis meis: et omnes iniquitates meas dele.

Cor mundum crea in me, Deus: et spiritum rectum innova in visceribus meis.
Ne proiicias me a facie tua: et spiritum sanctum tuum ne auferas a me.
Redde mihi laetitiam salutaris tui: et spiritu principali confirma me.
Docebo iniquos vias tuas: et impii ad te convertentur.
Libera me de sanguinibus, Deus, Deus salutis meae: et exsultabit lingua mea iustitiam tuam.
Domine, labia mea aperies: et os meum annuntiabit laudem tuam.
Quoniam si voluisses sacrificium, dedissem utique: holocaustis non delectaberis.
Sacrificium Deo spiritus contribulatus: cor contritum, et humiliatum, Deus, non despicies.
Benigne fac, Domine, in bona voluntate tua Sion: et aedificentur muri Ierusalem.
Tunc acceptabis sacrificium iustitiae, oblationes, et holocausta: tunc imponent super altare tuum vitulos.

— Psalms 50:3–21
Translation:
English

Have mercy upon me, O God, according to thy lovingkindness.
According to the multitude of thy tender mercies blot out my transgressions.
Wash me thoroughly from mine iniquity: and cleanse me from my sin.
For I know my transgressions; And my sin is ever before me.
Against thee, thee only, have I sinned, And done that which is evil in thy sight; That thou mayest be justified when thou speakest, And be clear when thou judgest.
Behold, I was brought forth in iniquity; And in sin did my mother conceive me.
Behold, thou desirest truth in the inward parts; And in the hidden part thou wilt make me to know wisdom.
Purify me with hyssop, and I shall be clean: Wash me, and I shall be whiter than snow.
Make me to hear joy and gladness, That the bones which thou hast broken may rejoice.
Hide thy face from my sins, And blot out all mine iniquities.

Create in me a clean heart, O God; And renew a right spirit within me.
Cast me not away from thy presence; And take not thy holy Spirit from me.
Restore unto me the joy of thy salvation; And uphold me with a willing spirit.
Then will I teach transgressors thy ways; And sinners shall be converted unto thee.
Deliver me from bloodguiltiness, O God, thou God of my salvation; And my tongue shall sing aloud of thy righteousness.
O Lord, open thou my lips; And my mouth shall show forth thy praise.
For thou delightest not in sacrifice; else would I give it: Thou hast no pleasure in burnt-offering.
The sacrifices of God are a broken spirit: A broken and contrite heart, O God, thou wilt not despise.
Do good in thy good pleasure unto Zion: Build thou the walls of Jerusalem.
Then will thou delight in the sacrifices of righteousness, In burnt-offering and in whole burnt-offering: Then will they offer bullocks upon thine altar.

— Psalms 51

== See also ==
- Leçons de ténèbres
- Spem in alium
