= Giovanni Battista Costanzi =

Italian composer and cellist

Giovanni Battista Costanzi (1704-1778) was an Italian composer and cellist. He succeeded Stefano Fabri as maestro di cappella of the Cappella Giulia at St. Peter's Basilica in Rome. Also known as a teacher of Luigi Boccherini, the main theatre of the Teatro dell'Opera di Roma is dedicated to Costanzi.

== Recordings ==
- Cantata per Natale, soloists, Gambe di legno, Fra Bernardo.
- Sonate per violoncello. Giovanni Sollima; Monika Leskovar. Arianna Art Ensemble. Glossa.
