= Leçons de ténèbres =

French Baroque music genre

Leçons de ténèbres (lit. 'lessons of darkness'; sometimes spelled Leçons des ténèbres) is a genre of French Baroque music which developed from the polyphonic lamentations settings for the tenebrae service of Renaissance composers such as Sermisy, Gesualdo, Brumel, Tallis, and Tomás Luis de Victoria into virtuoso solo chamber music.

== Spelling ==
In the original French sources "Leçons de ténèbres" is more common; the spelling "Leçons des ténèbres" is increasingly common in later resources, but modern sources still use "de", as seen in Sébastien Gaudelus's Les offices de Ténèbres en France, 1650–1790 (2005). The capitalisation of "ténèbres" varies.

== Liturgical function ==
The tenebrae service uses the text of the Lamentations of Jeremiah, originally deploring the Siege of Jerusalem (587 BC) and subsequent desolation of the city, but applied allegorically to the three days of mourning for Christ between his crucifixion and resurrection.

However the context of the French Leçons de ténèbres was often private performance. Delalande's 15-year-old daughter sang for Louis XIV first in his living rooms and then in chapel, becoming the praise of all Paris. Philidor's catalogue indicates that Delalande's three surviving virtuoso solo Leçons de ténèbres were composed for such occasions.

A complete set of Leçons de ténèbres for the full three days of Holy Week (Holy Thursday, Good Friday, Holy Saturday; played for practical reasons on the eve of each mentioned day, so: Holy Wednesday, Holy Thursday, Good Friday), would have included nine lessons, with each of these leçons requiring the setting of specific texts from Lamentations, although the conventions of exactly which texts to set varied slightly from the Renaissance to the Baroque, and by local custom. The following represents the typical French baroque schema set by Marc-Antoine Charpentier, which follows the order of the Roman Breviary of St. Pius V as it was promulgated after the Council of Trent in 1568.

Holy Wednesday

- Première leçon pour le mercredi Saint – 1:1–5
- Deuxième leçon pour le mercredi Saint – 1:6–9
- Troisième leçon pour le mercredi Saint – 1:10–14

Holy Thursday

- Première leçon pour le jeudi Saint – 2:8–11
- Deuxième leçon pour le jeudi Saint – 2:12–15
- Troisième leçon pour le jeudi Saint – 3:1–9

Good Friday

- Première leçon pour le vendredi Saint – 3:22–30
- Deuxième leçon pour le vendredi Saint – 4:1–6
- Troisième leçon pour le vendredi Saint – 5:1–11

However, in practice composers rarely supplied a complete group of all 9 settings. A notable exception was Charpentier, who authored a complete set Les Neuf Leçons de ténèbres (H. 96–110) and duplicated all the settings several times over.

In addition the services required antiphons and supplementary motets – 9 for each day, 27 in total. Charpentier again produced extensively in this genre, such as his Les neuf répons du mercredi saint (H. 111–119, 120–125, 135–137). As with the lessons the French répons are stylistically differentiated from the Renaissance responsories for Holy Week of Victoria and Gesualdo.

== Musical style ==
The characteristic style of the Leçons de ténèbres is defined by the trend to soloist virtuoso performance, for one or two vocalists with basso continuo, and introspective and melismatic music – specifically in the melismas on the Hebrew letters introducing each Latin verse.

By way of contrast the larger scale choral and orchestral lamentations of provincial composer Jean Gilles stand outside the mainly Parisian genre, and more in line with the lamentations of Central European baroque composers such as Zelenka and Heinichen.

== Composers ==
Of the settings by far the best known are the Leçons de ténèbres of Couperin, however Couperin's were not the first nor was he the most prolific composer in the genre:

- Claudin de Sermisy,
- John Sheppard, Tenebrae Responsories.
- Thomas Tallis, Lamentations of Jeremiah
- Marc-Antoine Charpentier – many complete settings, H.91, H.92, H.93, H.94, H.95, H.96, H.97, H.98, H.99 a, b, c, H.100, a, b, c, H.101, H.102, H.103, H.104, H.105, H.106, H.107, H.108, H.109, H.110, Répons (H.111 - H.119), H.120, H.121, H.122, H. 123, H.124, H.125, Répons (H.126 - 134), H.135, H.136, H.137, H.138, H.139, H.140, H.141, H.142, H.143, H.144 (1670 - 1695).
- Michel Lambert (1689)°
- Michel Richard Delalande before 1711 – one setting each for Wednesday, Thursday and Friday survive.
- François Couperin 1714, 3 settings for Wednesday survive, the other 6 settings for Thursday and Friday are lost.
- Sébastien de Brossard
- Jean-Féry Rebel (lost)
- Louis-Nicolas Clérambault C.183 - 188 (lost)
- Jean Gilles
- Nicolas Bernier
- Jean-Baptiste Gouffet
- Joseph Michel
- Charles-Henri de Blainville
- Guillaume Bouzignac
- Alexandre Villeneuve
- Joseph Meunier d'Haudimont
- Charles-Henri de Blainville
- Michel Corrette

Later composers who in part followed the French chamber style in their settings of lamentations include:

- Joseph-Hector Fiocco
- Franz Xaver Richter
- Jan Dismas Zelenka
- Arnaud Dumond – Suite of nine nocturnes for solo guitar

== Selected recordings ==
- Marc-Antoine Charpentier :
  - Leçons de Ténèbres, Office du Mercredi Saint, H.117, H.120, H.138, H.131, H.126, H.141, H.173, Office du Jeudi Saint, H. 121, H.139, H.136, H.144, H.128, H. 528, H. 510, H. 521, Office du Vendredi Saint, H.95, H.99, H.100, H.140, H.133, H.130. Il Seminario Musicale, Gérard Lesne. Virgin Classics 1995. Diapason d'Or
  - Leçons de Ténèbres, Office du Mercredi Saint, H.96, H.97, H.98, H.111, H.112, H.113, Office du Jeudi Saint, H.102, H.103, H.109; Office du Vendredi Saint, H.105, H.106, H.110 - Judith Nelson, Anne Verkinderen (sopranos), René Jacobs, Concerto Vocale René Jacobs, dir. Harmonia Mundi 1979 Diapason d'or
  - Leçons de Ténèbres, H.96, H.97, H.98/108, H.102, H.103, H.106, H.105, H.109, H.110, H.100 a - Anne Marie Rodde, Sonia Nigoghossian, Helen Watts, Clara Virz, La Grande Écurie et La Chambre du Roy, dir Jean Claude Malgoire. CBS 1978
  - Leçons de Ténèbres, H.120, H.121, H.122, H.123, H.124, H.125, H.135, H.136, H.137; Howard Crook, Luc de Meulenaere, haute-contres; Jan Caals, Harry Ruyl, ténors; Michel Verschaeve, basse taille; Kurt Widmer, basse; Musica Polyphonica, dir Louis Devos. Erato 1984.
- François Couperin :
  - Couperin : Leçons de tenèbres, Alfred Deller, Philip Todd, Raphaël Perulli, Michel Chapuis, Harmonia Mundi 1970.
  - Office des Ténèbres de la Semaine Sainte, 3 Leçons de Ténèbres du Mercredy, Il Seminario Musicale, Gérard Lesne. Harmonic records Cantus. 1993 Diapason d’or
  - Hasnaa Bennani, Isabelle Druet, Claire Lefilliâtre (sopranos), Vincent Dumestre, Le Poème Harmonique, Alpha 2014.
- Michel Richard Delalande :
  - Claire Lefilliâtre (soprano), Vincent Dumestre, Le Poème Harmonique, Alpha 2002.
  - Sophie Karthäuser (soprano), Sébastien Daucé, Ensemble Correspondances, Harmonia Mundi 2015.
- Michel Lambert
  - Neuf Leçons de Ténèbres, Ivete Piveteau, conductor, Noemi Rime, soprano, Nathalie Stutzmann, contralto, Charles Brett, haute-contre, Howard Crook, ténor, Virgin classics 1989
  - Neuf leçons de Ténèbres, Marc Mauillon, Myriam Rigol, viole de gambe, Roussel Thibaut, luth, Mankar-Bennis, clavecin. CD Harmonia Mundi 2018
- Jan Dismas Zelenka
  - Leçons de Ténèbres and Répons, Collegium Vocale 1704, Collegium 1704, Vaclav Luks, conductor. CD Accent 2012
