= Leçons de ténèbres (Couperin) =

1714 French Baroque vocal pieces

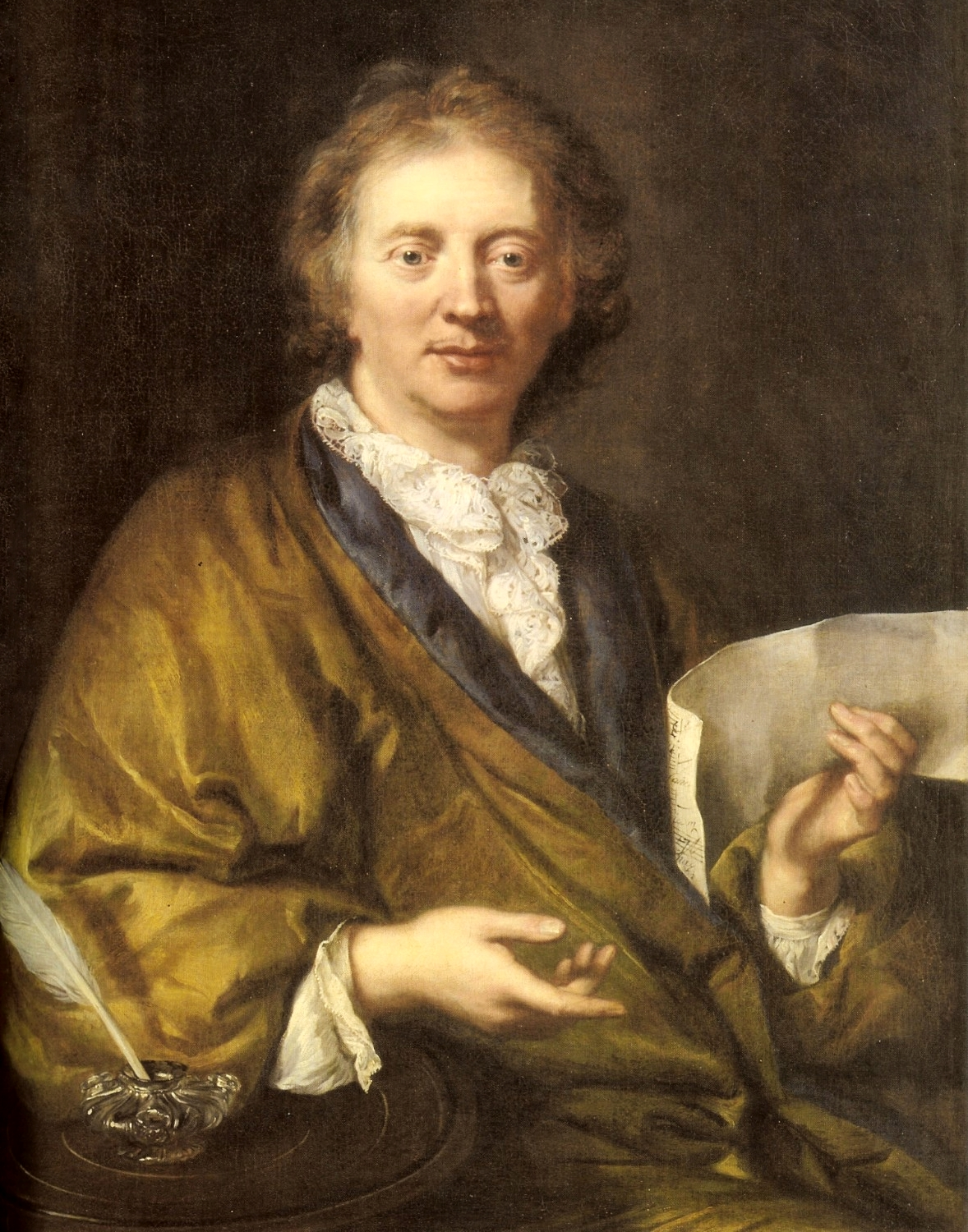
François Couperin

The Leçons de ténèbres à une et à deux voix ("Tenebrae Readings for One and Two Voices," originally spelled "Leçons de tenébres a une et a deux voix") are a series of three vocal pieces composed in 1714 by François Couperin for the Abbaye royale de Longchamp.

Couperin's Leçons de ténèbres use the Latin text of the Old Testament Book of Lamentations, in which Jeremiah deplores the destruction of Jerusalem by the Babylonians.

Musical settings of the Lamentations of Jeremiah the Prophet were common in the Renaissance, famous polyphonic examples being those by Thomas Tallis, Tomás Luis de Victoria, Lassus, and Palestrina. Leçons de ténèbres were a particular French subgenre of this music which rose to prominence during the reign of King Louis XIV, with other similar settings being composed by Marc-Antoine Charpentier, Michel Delalande and others.

Couperin's settings of the Leçons de Ténèbres are scored for soprano vocalists and basso continuo. Couperin originally intended to write two more sets of three for the proceeding two days of Holy Week, but they were either lost or never completed; indeed, this was the last work of sacred vocal music he wrote. Each Latin verse is preceded by a melisma on the first letter of the Hebrew text. The first two were composed for one single voice, while the third was written for two voices.

The works have generally been regarded positively, with Buelow (2004) describing it as "Couperin's greatest achievement in sacred music" and Mellers (1987) as "the highest point of Couperin's church music, and one of the peaks of his music as a whole."
