= Francesco Beretta =

Italian composer

Francesco Beretta (born 1640 in Rome; died 6 July 1694 in Rome) was an Italian organist, composer and Kapellmeister and a predecessor of Paolo Lorenzani - a pupil of Orazio Benevoli - at the Cappella Giulia of St. Peter.

== Biography ==
Beretta's first teacher of music had been Stefano Fabri jr., who was the son of Stefano Fabri. Both of the Fabris worked at the Cappella Giulia, whereas Fabri jr.'s father was a director of music there. Intermediately during the years of 1657 until 1664 Beretta was the musical maestro of the cathedral of Tivoli. Beginning with the year 1664 he advanced to be the director of music at the Chiesa Santo Spirito in Sassia in Rome. Later on at the 21st of September 1678 he was made the director of music of the Cappella Giulia in Rome. He stayed there until his death in 1694. In 1675 he is mentioned as "Don Franc. Beretti". In the libretto of the Oratory „San Ermenegildo" he is titled as „Canonico regolare di S. Spirito e Maestro di capella della Basilica Vaticano di Roma" – this is a canon regular at St. Peter's Basilica.

== Selected works ==
There is a copy of a mass for 4 choirs and 16 voices - the so-called Missa mirabiles elationes maris, which had been done by Marc-Antoine Charpentier, who additionally added some parts. Charpentier is said to have complained the workout of the counterpoint to be very weak. This copy is recently in the National Library of France in Paris. The mass Dies iste celebratur is claimed to have been created for the cardinal M. Santacroce, the bishop of Tivoli, in 1558 in order to celebrate a votive consecration. There exists a recording of this mass. He composed lots of antiphons, offertories and masses in the so-called Roman style.

Giovanni Battista Caifabri published the following compositions:

- San Ermenegildo, Oratory
- Scelta de’ motetti a due e tre voci, composti da diversi eccellentissimi Autori… parte seconda, A. Belmonte, 1667
- Scelta di mottetti sacri raccolti da diversi eccellentissimi autori… , Rome 1667
- Arch. del Capitolo di S. Pietro, Cappella Giulia, arm. 20–23, misc XCI, 429: Cantori della Cappella Giulia, fasc. Maestri di Cappella di San Pietro, s.n. di ff., s.d., 1678
- Salmi vespertini a quattro voci concertati e brevi con l’organo per tutte le feste dell’anno…, 1683
- Lauda Ierusalem a quattro voci, concertato e breve con organo, 1683

== Selected recordings ==
- Missa Mirabiles elationes maris, Ensemble Correspondances, conducted by Sébastien Daucé. CD Harmonia Mundi HMM 922640 (2020)
