= Antonio Masini =

Florentine composer

Antonio Masini (c. 1639 – 20 September 1678) was an Italian composer and conductor. During the last years of his life in Rome he was the Kapellmeister of the Cappela Giulia in Rome and furthermore the chamber musician of the former Queen of Sweden Kristina during her stay in Rome.

== Biography ==
Antonio Masini was born in Florence in c. 1639. During the years 1663 and 1664, his presence in Lucca and Ferrara is known. His opera L’Eumene (now lost) was staged in Ferrara in 1666. In accordance with a report, he already had been in Rome in 1671. A request to pay a surgeon's bill is documented for the intended castration of a boy called Paolo Nanini in order to maintain his voice. In initially worked in Rome as a chamber musician in service to Christina, Queen of Sweden; and continued to do so while working as a church musician.

On 1 May 1674, Masini was named maestro di cappella of St. Peter's Basilica at the Vatican; a post which he maintained until his death. He concurrently served as maestro di capella of the Confraternita della S. Casa di Loreto dei Marchigiani associated with the San Salvatore in Lauro. In recognition of the Holy Year of 1675, eight of his oratorios were performed at the oratory of the Chiesa di Sant'Orsola della Pietà in Rome; including La morte di Saul, Ieft, Sacrifizio d’Abram, S Eustachio, S Dorotea, Sommersione di Faraone, Sposalizio di Salomone, and Tobia. These works demonstrate some of the earliest implementation of the concerto grosso form.

In February of 1678, he performed a play in the presence of several cardinals and his employer Christina, Queen of Sweden. This so called Comedia di Antonio Masini took place in the Casa di Monsù Ridò a Monte Brianzo. Scholars believe this could have been the opera Il Narciso. He died in Rome not long after on September 20, 1678. His post at the St. Peter's Basilica was assumed by Francesco Beretta after his death. According to Baini, his burial place is S. Maria in Posterola.

== Works ==
His best known compositions are as follows:

- Il giuditio delle stagioni concerto musicale rappresentato nella solennità della Ss.ma Annuntiata, (performed at: scuole di S. Maria Cortelandini, Libretto: B. Beverini; Lucca 1663)
- L’Eumene (Oper, Libretto: A. Passarelli, performed in Ferrara at: teatro Bonacossi a S. Stefano, 1666)
- Il Narciso (obviously performed in presence of the former Queen of Sweden in 1678)

Furthermore there exist several oratorios and sacred songs (to be accompanied by Basso continuo) in the libraries of Naples, the Vatican, and in Bologna.
