= Plagal cadence =

Musical cadence

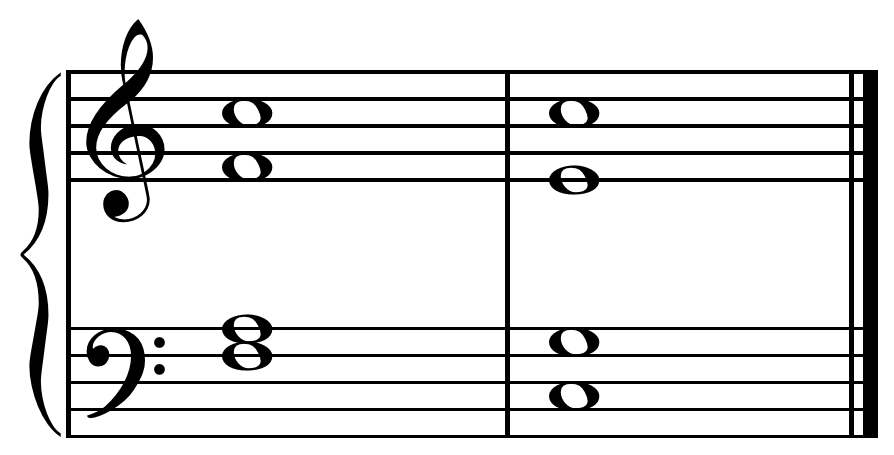
Plagal cadence in C major.

In music theory, a plagal cadence is a type of harmonic cadence in which the subdominant chord moves directly to the tonic chord. It is also sometimes called the Amen cadence due to its prevalence at the ending of hymns, particularly those published between the mid-19th and mid-20th centuries. The plagal cadence has been described as being sadder, softer, and less conclusive than the authentic cadence.

== History ==
As early as the early 16th century, German music theorists described a cadence in which the lowest voice drops by a fourth as a clausula formalis (formal close). 18th century music theorists including Guillaume-Gabriel Nivers, Charles Masson, and Jean-Philippe Rameau analyzed the cadence, calling it a cadence imparfaite (imperfect cadence) or cadence irreguliére (irregular cadence). Charles-Henri de Blainville coined the term plagal cadence in his Essay sur un troisieme mode in 1751.

== Modern use ==
Plagal cadences are commonly used in rock music: the IV chord is the most common chord preceding the tonic in rock music other than the tonic itself. Modern rock songs that utilize a plagal cadence include "Billie Jean" by Michael Jackson, "Fortunate Son" by Creedence Clearwater Revival, "Hound Dog" by Jerry Leiber and Mike Stoller, and "In My Life" by The Beatles. The fourth and sixth scale degrees, which are used in the IV chord, are rarely treated as stable in rock music.

Gospel and blues music often uses repeating plagal cadences throughout sections rather than just using them as single-phrase endings. Plagal cadences are also associated with folk-influenced music.

== Variations ==
=== Minor plagal cadence ===
F minor chord (pictured) resolving to C.

A minor plagal cadence is a type of plagal cadence which uses a minor iv instead of the typical major IV before resolving to the I chord. This cadence is often considered to evoke a nostalgic or bittersweet sound. Because the iv minor chord is not diatonic to the major key, it is also an example of modal interchange with the parallel minor key. The minor plagal cadence was recognized as early as the 1670s, with Wolfgang Caspar Printz coining the term clausula formalis perfecta dissecta acquiescens (dissected acquiescent perfect formal close) to describe the cadence. The minor plagal cadence often follows a major IV chord, creating an IV-iv-I progression that makes use of voice-leading.
