= Nicolas Goupillet =

French composer

Nicolas Goupillet also Coupillet or Goupillier (Senlis, ca. 1650 - Paris, ca. 1713) was a French Baroque composer - albeit a composer who may not have himself composed all of his works.

In 1683 the then fifty-year-old "Sun King" Louis XIV commanded that a competition be held to select four rotating seasonal choirmasters to replace the retiring Henry Du Mont and at the Chapelle royale. Of the 35 applicants, four were selected: Michel Richard Delalande, then the late Lully's assistant Pascal Colasse; Guillaume Minoret a minor figure from Saint-Germain-l'Auxerrois; and finally Nicolas Goupillet, from Meaux.

Goupillet was dismissed from the Chapelle Royale in 1693 when it was discovered that he had been passing off as his own compositions the works of Henry Desmarets - a talented composer who had passed over because of his youth in the competition 10 years earlier. At first the story went around that Desmarets had simply heard his works performed by chance, later suspicions were aroused that Desmarets had been complicit in the deception and blown the whistle when Goupillet failed to pay him. And yet Goupillet clearly could compose when he had to, since the second stage of the original competition in 1683 secluded the applicants in Paris and had them all write grands motets to Psalm 31 Beati quorum remissae sunt iniquitates. In any event the king was not too hard on Goupillet and awarded him a modest pension and a canonship at Saint-Quentin, Aisne.

Goupillet claimed to have been a choir-boy at Notre-Dame under Pierre Robert, but no evidence survives of this. Goupillet was first employed at Langres Cathedral till he was dismissed, for reasons unknown, in September 1681. He found work in Meaux, but then in 1683 applied for, and succeeded, in application for the Paris competition. Sébastien de Brossard lists several works (now lost) as possibly by Goupillet, but the way in which Brossard describes them suggest they were actually by André Pechon, Goupillet's predecessor at Meaux. During the 9 months of the year when he was not required in Paris, Goupillet returned to work with Pierre Tabart at Meaux.
