= Stefano Fabri jr. =

Italian composer

Stefano Fabri junior (born c. 1606 in Rome; died 27 August 1658 in Rome) was the son of Stefano Fab(b)ri (1560–1609), who was the Kapellmeister of the Cappella Giulia. He was the pupil of Giovanni Bernardino Nanino. and the music teacher of Francesco Beretta.

== Biography ==
He was the director of music at the Seminario Romano (1638-1639) and following until 1644 at San Giovanni dei Fiorentini. Afterwards, he stayed at San Luigi de’ Francesi until 1657. He is claimed to have been the director of music of the ensemble of the church of Santa Maria Maggiore in 1648 - definitely, he is mentioned there beginning in 1657. He is also supposed to have been offered employment as a director of music for St. Peter in Rome in 1654, but Baini reports Orazio Benevoli to have been the Maestro there at that time.

A compilation of several compositions (Florido, Cantiones Sacrae ab Excell. Musices Auctoribus) notices him as Maestro in S. Pietro in Vaticano. A severe outbreak of pestilence in 1656 made Pope Alexander VII forbid all public events in Rome. Despite all that, Fabri was made the maestro at Santa Maria Maggiore and in 1657, he advanced to be the director of music of the private chapel of the Borghese family at the same church.

== Works ==
About twenty of his compositions had been published during his lifetime. Several compilations of all the composers of that time were edited by Domenico Bianchi, Filippo Beretti, Giovanni Poggioli and especially by Florido de Silvestris. His brother-in-law and Giacomo Fei published his Magnificat and the Salmi concertati. Many polychoral compositions have been preserved, for example pieces of music like the Magnificat, Confitebor, Laudate pueri, etc.. In Santa Maria Maggiore exists a copy of a mass in five parts.

- Motets a 2-5, Rome 1650
- Salmi concertanti, 1660

== Sheet music ==
- Fabri, Credidi propter quod locutus sum: https://musopen.org/de/music/39022-credidi-propter-quod-locutus-sum/
- Fabri, Emendemus in melius (3 voices, B. continuo): https://musopen.org/de/music/39023-emendemus-in-melius/

== Recordings ==
- Choral Concert: Uppsala Academic Chamber Choir - FABRI II, S. / BERNHARD, C. / VESI, S. / PERANDA, G. / SCHMELZER, J.H. (Laudate!); Catalogue: Proprius PROP7800; Naxos
- Choral Concert: Uppsala Academic Chamber Choir - FABRI II, S. / BERNHARD, C. / VESI, S. / PERANDA, G. / SCHMELZER, J.H. / FOGGIA, F. (Laudate); Catalogue: Proprius PRCD9100; Naxos
