= Pietro Paolo Bencini =

Italian Baroque composer (c1670–1755)

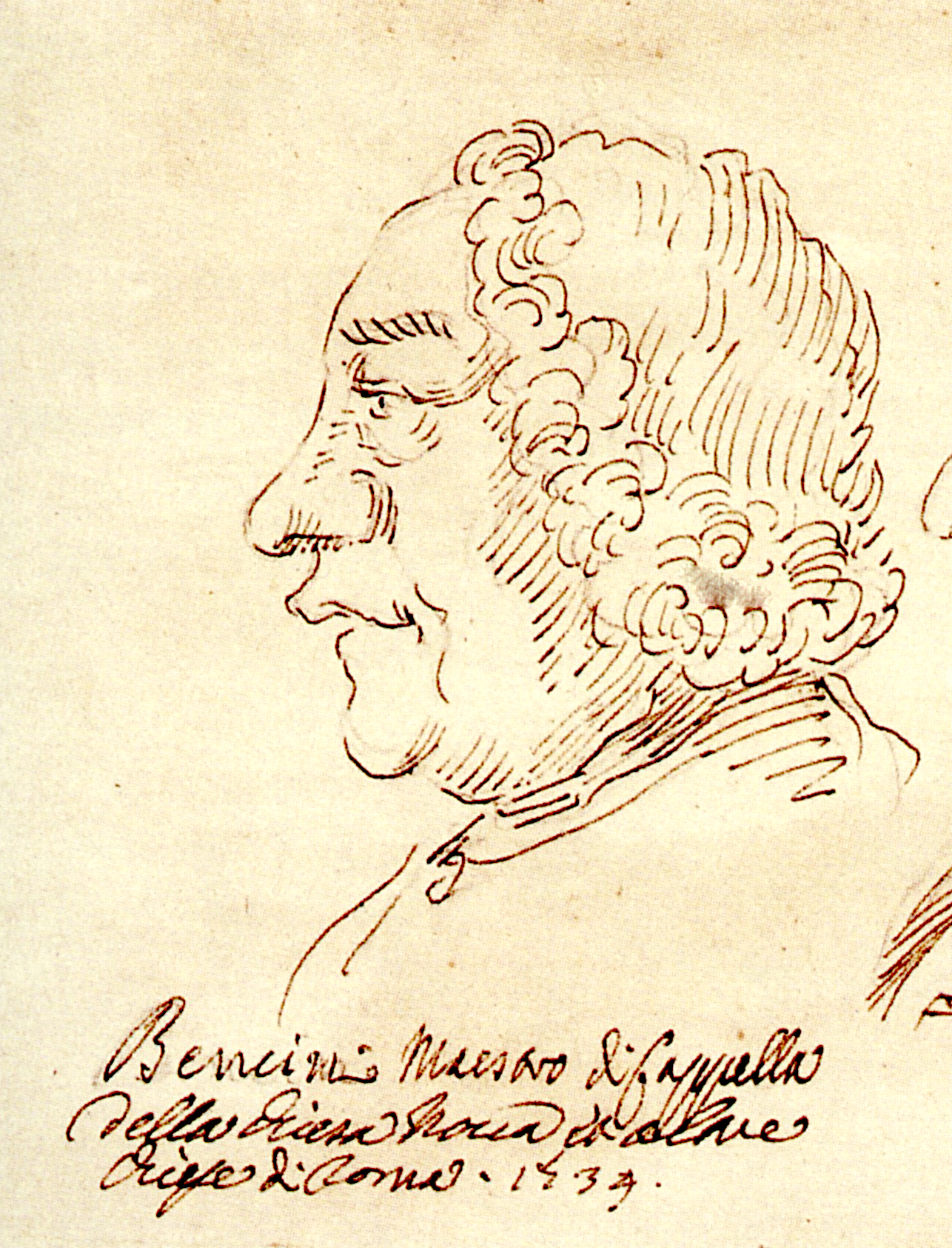
Pietro Paulo Bencini, caricature by Pier Leone Ghezzi, 1734

Pietro Paolo Bencini (c. 1670 – 6 July 1755) was an Italian Baroque composer and Kapellmeister. He was the father of Antonio Bencini (died 13 March 1748), who was also known as a composer of sacred works.

== Life ==
Bencini was born into a musical family. He became maestro di cappella at several churches in Rome. His compositional output consists mostly of religious music, including several oratorios and cantatas. He was maestro di cappella at the Chiesa Nuova (The Roman Oratory) from 1705 to 1743.

He left there to succeed Giuseppe Ottavio Pitoni (1657-1743) as maestro di cappella of the Cappella Giulia at Saint Peter's Basilica in Rome. Between 1749 until 1753, he was supported by Niccolo Jomelli, because Bencini became more and more unable to work because of illness. During this time Jomelli, who was better known as a composer of operas, created the most of his sacral compositions. In 1753, Jomelli left Rome in order to succeed Ignaz Holzbauer in Stuttgart. On his death, Bencini was succeeded by Giovanni Battista Costanzi (1704-1778).

== Selected works ==
He is the author of compositions like oratories, masses, secular and sacral cantatas, liturgies, antiphones and psalms. Many of his sacral works are stored at the Vatican Library. Some of his oratories and additional spiritual music as following:

- Susanna a propheta Daniele vindicata (Giovanni Antonio Magnani, 1698)
- L' innocenza protetta (Giacomo Buonaccorsi, 1700)
- De inopia copia (Filippo Capistrelli, 1703)
- Salomon (Francesco Posterla, 1704)
- Introduzione all'oratorio della passione di nostro signore Gesù Cristo (Pietro Ottoboni, 1707 e 1708)
- S. Andrea Corsini (Giacomo Buonaccorsi, 1722)
- Ad sacrum drama de passione Domini nostri Jesu Christi introductio (1725)
- Il sacrificio di Abramo (oratorio, libretto by Giacomo Buonaccorsi, 1708)
- Tra l'ombre piu romite (cantata)
- Rimembranza crudele (cantata)
- Clori che m'invaghi (cantata)
- Jesu redemptor omnium (Christmas hymn)
