= Léonard de Hodémont =

Belgian musician

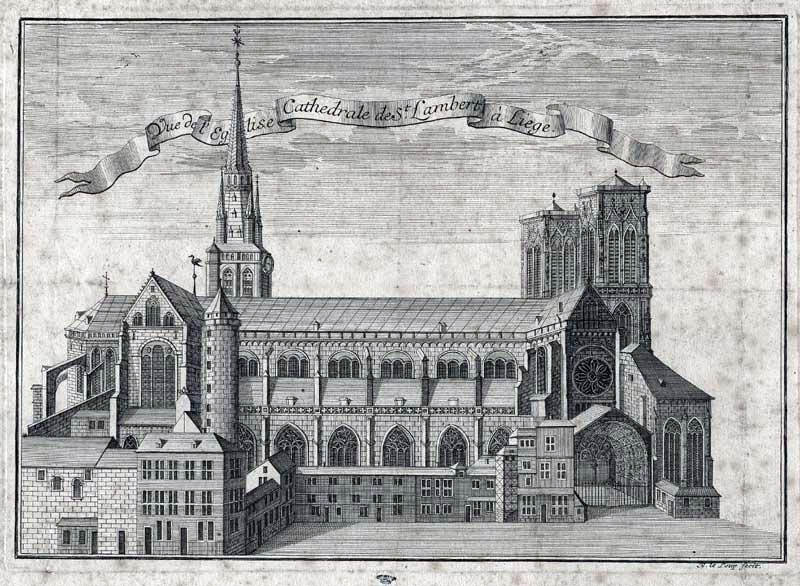
Engraving of St. Lambert's Cathedral

Léonard (Collet) de Hodémont (1575–1639), was a Belgian Baroque composer, conductor, and organist.

== Life ==
Hodémont is thought to have been born in Hodémont or Liège, and received his musical education at Saint Lambert's Cathedral in Liege. From 1595 he studied at the University of Leuven. On 15 October 1610 he was appointed as succentor at the collegiate church of Saint Pierre in Liège. In 1612 he became the canon at Saint Lambert's Cathedral and at the Church of St. Maternus in 1616. On 26 October 1619 he became choirmaster (maître de chant) at Saint Lambert's Cathedral. He held this position until 25 February 1633. He died in Liège.

== Works ==
As a composer he wrote mainly sacred works. His compositions were widely influenced by Italian styles. Hodémont's work influenced music at the beginning of the 17th century in Liège. His pupils included Lambert Pietkin and Henry Du Mont de Thier, who became maître de chapelle for Louis XIV.

=== Sacred works ===
- Salve Regina. Grand Livre de Chœur de Saint lambert
- 3 Ecce panis angelorum, from the 2nd choir book of Saint Lambert's Cathedral. (Liège)
- 14 Librorum antiphonarum de Sancti lamberti, (Liège, 1629)
- Sacri concertus, motets. (Liège, 1630)
- Various sacred compositions, whose manuscripts are preserved in Borgloon and the Conservatory of Liège.

=== Other works ===
- Armonica recreatione, a collection of villanellas for 3 voices and basso continuo. (Antwerp, 1625-1640)
