= Oronthée =

Oronthée (or Orontée) is a French-language opera by the composer Paolo Lorenzani, first performed by the singers and musicians of the Académie Royale de Musique (the Paris Opera) at Chantilly on 23 August 1688 as part of the celebrations the Prince of Condé gave for the Dauphin. It takes the form of a tragédie en musique in a prologue and five acts. Almost all of the score is lost.

== Sources ==
- Article on Lorenzani by Albert La France in The New Grove Dictionary of Music and Musicians, available online at the site CESAR
