= Jean-Baptiste Gouffet =

French organist and composer

Jean-Baptiste Gouffet (1669 in Paris – 1729 in Lyon) was a French organist and composer.

A Franciscan priest, Gouffet seems to have devoted his life entirely to God and to music. Organist in the Franciscan community of St Bonaventure, he composed many organ pieces, all lost. He was also recognized in his time for his talents as a singer and conductor.

Gouffet is the author of nine Leçons de ténèbres, composed in 1705, and of several collections of short motets, mostly for alto and basso continuo.

He was one of the many lyonnais masters of music of that time.
