= Olivier Schneebeli =

Olivier Schneebeli is a French conductor and choirmaster, as well as music teacher, known for his work on Baroque music. He was named to the Legion of Honour in 2021.

Olivier Schneebeli won a Diapason d'Or with Ensemble Vocal. Schneebeli led the Petits Chanteurs de Saint-Louis choir, producing a notable recording of Fauré's Requiem (1893 version) with the Collegium Vocal de Gent in 1988 for Harmonia Mundi recording of Fauré's Requiem with Philippe Herreweghe conducting.

Beginning in 1991, Schneebeli led a choir called "Les Pages et les Chantres" at the Centre de musique baroque de Versailles, retiring after thirty years in 2021. With this choir, Schneebeli sought to establish a major French choir to perform the 17th and 18th century repertoire of Versailles and the French cathedrals.

== Discography (selected) ==
- Guillaume Bouzignac : Motets et Scènes Sacrées, Ensemble Vocal Contrepoint, dir. Olivier Schneebeli. CD Arion (1983) Diapason d'or
- Marc-Antoine Charpentier : Le Massacre des innocents H.411, Psaumes de David H.170, H.215. H.216, H.220, H.221, H.326, Ensemble Vocal Contrepoint, La Symphonie du Marais, dir Olivier Schneebeli. CD Adda (1990)
- Henry Desmarest : Messe à 2 chœurs et 2 orchestres, Les Pages et les Chantres du Centre de Musique Baroque de Versailles, Nova Stravaganza, dir. Olivier Schneebeli. CD Virgin Veritas (2000)
- Michel-Richard de Lalande : Grands Motets, Les Pages et les Chantres du Centre de Musique Baroque de Versailles, La Grande Écurie et La Chambre du Roy, dir. Olivier Schneebeli. CD Virgin Veritas (2002)
- Marc-Antoine Charpentier : Vêpres pour Saint Louis (H.33, H.197, H.375, H.220, H.34, H.221, H.376, H.203, H.35, H.214, H.76, H.292), Les Pages et les Chantres du Centre de Musique Baroque de Versailles, dir. Olivier Schneebeli CD Alpha (2003)
- Jean-Baptiste Lully : Grands Motets, Les Pages et les Chantres du Centre de Musique Baroque de Versailles, Musica Florea de Prague, dir. Olivier Schneebeli. CD K617 (2004)
- Marc-Antoine Charpentier : Grands motets à double chœur, (H.171, H.167, H.168, H.74), Les Pages et les Chantres du Centre de Musique Baroque de Versailles, dir. Olivier Schneebeli, CD K 617 (2005)
- Nicolas Formé, Le Vœu de Louis XIII : Les Pages et les Chantres du Centre de Musique Baroque de Versailles, dir. Olivier Schneebeli. CD Alpha (2005)
- Henri-Joseph Rigel : Trois Hierodrames, La Sortie d'Égypte, Jephté, La Destruction de Jericho, Les Pages et les Chantres du Centre de Musique Baroque de Versailles, Orchestre des Folies Françoise, dir. Olivier Schneebeli. CD K617 (2007)
- André campra : Requiem, In Convertendo, Agnus Dei, Les Pages et les Chantres du Centre de Musique Baroque de Versailles, Orchestre de Musiques Anciennes et à Venir, dir. Olivier Schneebeli. CD K617 (2010)
- Marc-Antoine Charpentier : Judith Sive Bethulia liberata H.391, Le Massacre des innocents H.411, Les Pages, Les Chantres & Les Simphonistes du Centre de Musique baroque de Versailles, dir. Olivier Schneebeli. CD K617 (2012)
- André Campra : Tancrède, Les Pages et les Chantres du Centre de Musique Baroque de Versailles, Orchestre Les Temps présents, dir. Olivier Schneebeli. 3 CD Alpha (2016)
- Marc-Antoine Charpentier, Messe à 4 Chœurs H.4, Les Pages et les Chantres du Centre de Musique Baroque de Versailles, Maitrise de Radio France, dir. Olivier Schneebeli. CD Radio France (enregistré en 2019). 2021

== See also ==
- Baroque Music
- French Baroque music
