= Guillaume de Chastillon =

French composer

Guillaume Chastillon de la Tour (fl. 1550–1610) was a French composer of airs de cour and chansons. He published three books of airs in 1590 at Caen.
