= Henri Dumont =

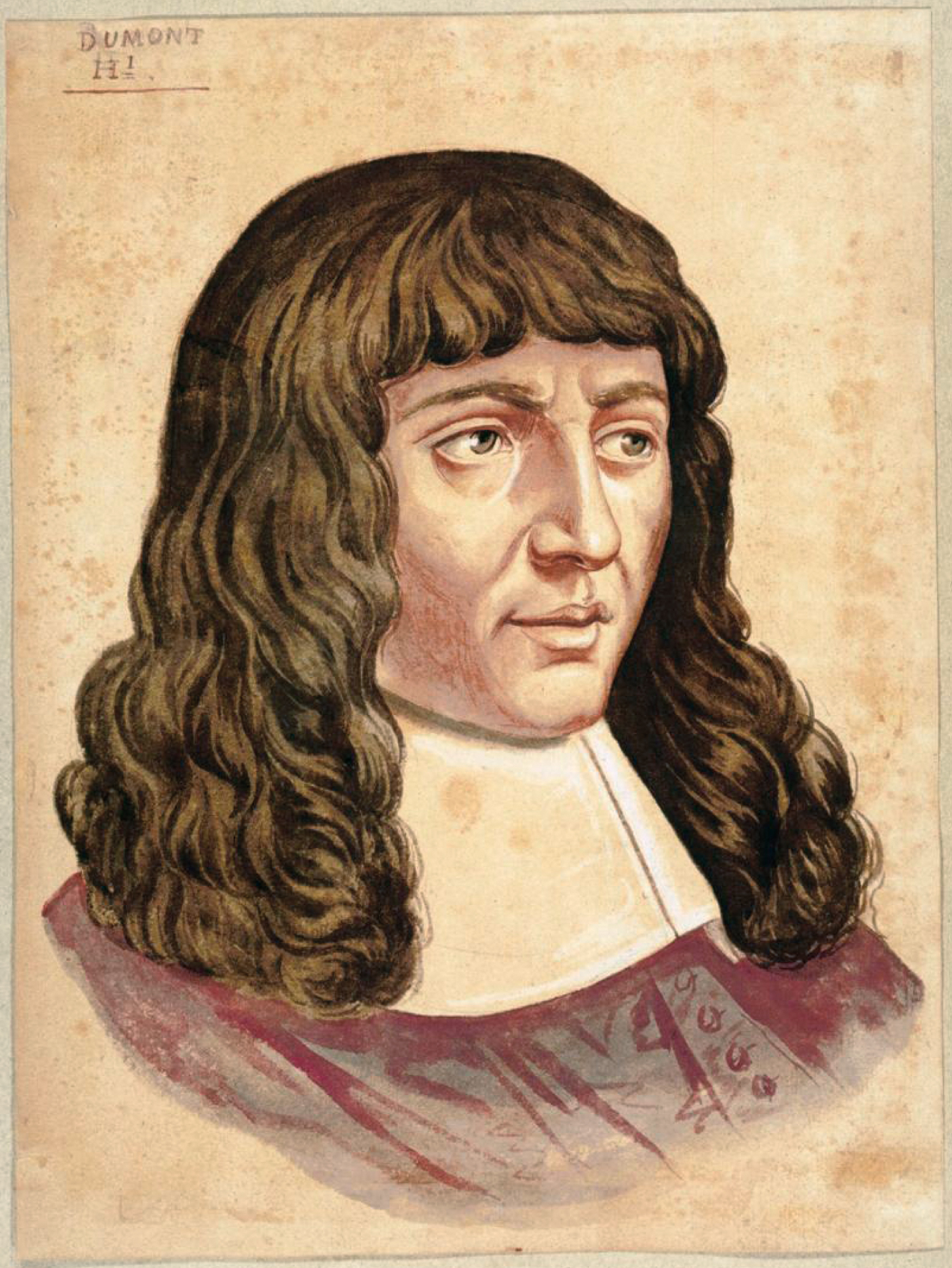
Mid-18c watercolor, purportedly a portrait of Henri Dumont

Henri Dumont (French pronunciation: [ɑ̃ʁi dymɔ̃]; also Henry Du Mont, originally Henry de Thier) (1610 – 8 May 1684) was a baroque composer of the French school, born in the Prince-Bishopric of Liège.

== Life ==
Dumont was born to Henry de Thier and Elisabeth Orban in Looz (Borgloon). The family moved to Maastricht in 1613, where Henri and his brother Lambert were choirboys at the church of Notre-Dame (i.e., the Basilica of Our Lady). In 1630 he was named organist and given a leave of two months to complete his education. In the principality of Liège (where he spent much of his time) he studied with Léonard de Hodémont (1575–1639), absorbing trends from Italy. On 1 December 1632, he resigned in favor of his brother. In 1639 he went to Paris to become organist at the important parish church of Saint-Paul. From this time he used the name Dumont or Du Mont in place of De Thier. From 1652 he was harpsichordist at the court of the Duke of Anjou (Philippe I, Duke of Orléans, the only brother of Louis XIV), and in 1660 he obtained that post on the household of Louis's young wife Marie-Thérése. In 1663 he became "maitre" of the Chapelle Royale in Versailles, in 1672 "Sous-maître de la musique du Roy" (with Pierre Robert) and in 1673 Master of the Queen's Music.

In 1653 Dumont married Mechthild Loyens, daughter of the mayor of Maastricht. As a widower he acquired the substantial benefice of the abbey of Silly near Lisieux in Normandy. In 1683 he resigned the last of his posts and died a year later in Paris.

== Works ==
With the exception of a few songs and the instrumental pieces in the 1657 Meslanges, Dumont was a composer of religious music. His output includes nearly a hundred Petits Motets, the principal French genre of his time; his illustrious successors were Jean-Baptiste Lully and François Couperin. Du Mont was the first to publish separate continuo partbooks in France.

- Meslanges à II, III, IV et V parties, avec la basse continue (1657)
- Cantica sacra II, III, IV cum vocibus tum instrumentibus modulata. Liber primus, Paris 1652
- Meslanges à II, III, IV et V parties, avec la basse continue (1657)
- Cinq Messes en plain-chant musical (1660, reprinted 1701 as Messes Royales en plein chant)
- Airs à 4 parties avec la basse continue ... sur la paraphrase des psaumes (1663)
- Motets à deux voix avec la basse continue (1668)
- Motets à deux III et IV parties, pour voix et instruments, avec la basse continue (1681)

The most important of these is Meslanges à II, III, IV & V parties avec le Bassecontinue contenant plusieurs chansons, motets, magnificats, Préludes et allemandes pour orgue et pour les viols. Et la litanie de la Vierge, [re]published in partbooks posthumously by Ballard under the title: Motets pour la Chapelle du Roy, mis en musique par Monsieur Dumont Abbé de Silly, et Maistre de la Musique de ladite Chapelle... Imprimez par exprès commandement de Sa Majesté. In addition, the Bibliothèque Nationale holds numerous works in manuscript among which is Dialogus de anima for five voices, a masterpiece that is his only true oratorio.

== Legacy ==
The anthology Cantica sacra published in 1652 contained motets for 1, 2, 3 or 4 soloists with continuo, the first of their kind in France. What was new was not the use of continuo (for which there was some precedent even among French composers, and there were abundant precedents in Italian scores) but the combining, in sacred music, of solo voices with obbligato instruments, particularly in the petits motets for one or two voices. Here there are many innovations, such as the introduction of typical Italian devices such as vocalise and echo. The grand motets also look forward to those later written for Versailles. The oratorio genre and the recitativo style are both prefigured in the dialogue motets. As to the continuo, if he did not introduce it to France, he was the first to print a separate partbook and thus did much to propagate its use. His grands motets pour la Chapelle Royale (1686) reunite all the formal experiments of his previous work. It is notable that Dumont's motets were sung in parish churches into the 1730s, that is, 60 years after his death.

=== Grands Motets ===
Dumont's grands motets for the Chapelle Royale are the first representatives of the genre. Unlike the later works of Lully, Delalande, Desmarest, Charpentier, Mondonville and Rameau they are not made of successive movements unified by key and thematic material - rather, the versets (without final barline, regardless of what appears in some modern editions) are linked and ordered with a constant eye towards contrast, which can also be seen in the deployment of the performing forces: soloists, groups of soloists, sub-choir, ripieno and orchestra all join, retire, engage in dialogue, and reunite, the solo voices rejoining the choir. The five-part writing is typical of the French grand motet and remained so until the 18th century. Dumont used two violins and two violas [sic], which is noteworthy because it reflects North European practice, whereas Lully used one violin part and three violas. (This likely means clefs; the violin family was not yet standardized.)

- Note on pitch: The meantone temperament prevailed in France until the end of the 18th century, above all in religious music using the organ (Dumont's instrument).
- Note on instrumentation: The orchestra for grands motets contained théorbos and harpsichord (and organ), violins and viols.

His five plainchant masses, known as the Messes Royales, survived up to the mid-20th century (before Vatican II), though they display little of the genius developed in his motet writing. Nevertheless one can still hear them sung at major feasts in a few Catholic places of worship (for example at St Eugène in Paris) and his motets also continue to find a place in the liturgy.

In the 1681 Motets à ii iii & iv parties the following note appears, suggesting four singers as the normal size for a choir (as Joshua Rifkin argues in Bach's Chorus: A Preliminary Report): "Quand on voudra deux pourrant chanter dans une mesme Partie, & la petit lettre italique signifie qu'une des deux doit chanter seul, & la grosse lettre ronde pour chanter Tous ensemble comme si c'estoir à deux choeurs."

== Bibliography ==
- Laurence Decobert: Henry Dumont (1610–1684), sous-maître de la chapelle de Louis XIV : contribution à l'histoire de la musique religieuse au Grand Siècle (Lille, 1990)

== Recordings ==
- Motets pour la chapelle du roi, Magnificat (La Chapelle royale, Philippe Herreweghe) Harmonia Mundi 1981
- Motets à voix seule (Ricercar Consort, Henri Ledroit haute-contre) Ricercar 1984
- Motets et dialogue (Les Talens Lyriques, Christophe Rousset). Virgin veritas 2004.
- Henry Du Mont : O Mysterium, Motets & Élévations, l'Ensemble Correspondances, conducted by Sébastien Daucé, Harmonia Mundi, 2016.
- Les litanies de la vierge (Ensemble Dumont, Peter Bennet) Linn 2018
- Grands Motets, Magnificat, Ricercar Consort, Choeur de Chambres de Namur, dir Philippe Pierlot. Ricercar 2002
- A fairly extensive discography
