= Francis Dominic Bencini =

Maltese philosopher (1664–1744)

- Born: 1664; Malta
- Died: 1744 (aged 79–80)
- Occupation: Philosopher

Francis Dominic Bencini (1664–1744) was a Maltese philosopher who specialised in apologetics.

== Life ==
Benici began his studies in Malta, and went on to become a diocesan priest. He then studied theology in Rome, from where he obtained his graduate colours. Thereafter, he immediately began teaching dogmatic theology at the Collegio Urbano, in Rome, Italy. While there, he was also installed as librarian of Propaganda Fide, and chosen as secretary to the pontifical councils. He dedicated much of his intellectual energies to the anti-reformist polemic which was in full swing during his times.

After many years working hard in Rome, Bencini expected to be awarded for his efforts. However, no official recognition was forthcoming, and this left him quite embittered. Sick of waiting, he thus left Rome and went to Turin, in northern Italy. There, at least, he was made professor at the University of Turin. He mainly taught theology and Holy Scripture. He seems to have been glad at his new place of adoption. For, from his personal financial resources, he paid for the establishment of a Chair of Apologetics, and also established a Catholic school of catechism.

Bencini may have died in Turin. No portrait of him is known to exist.

== Publications ==
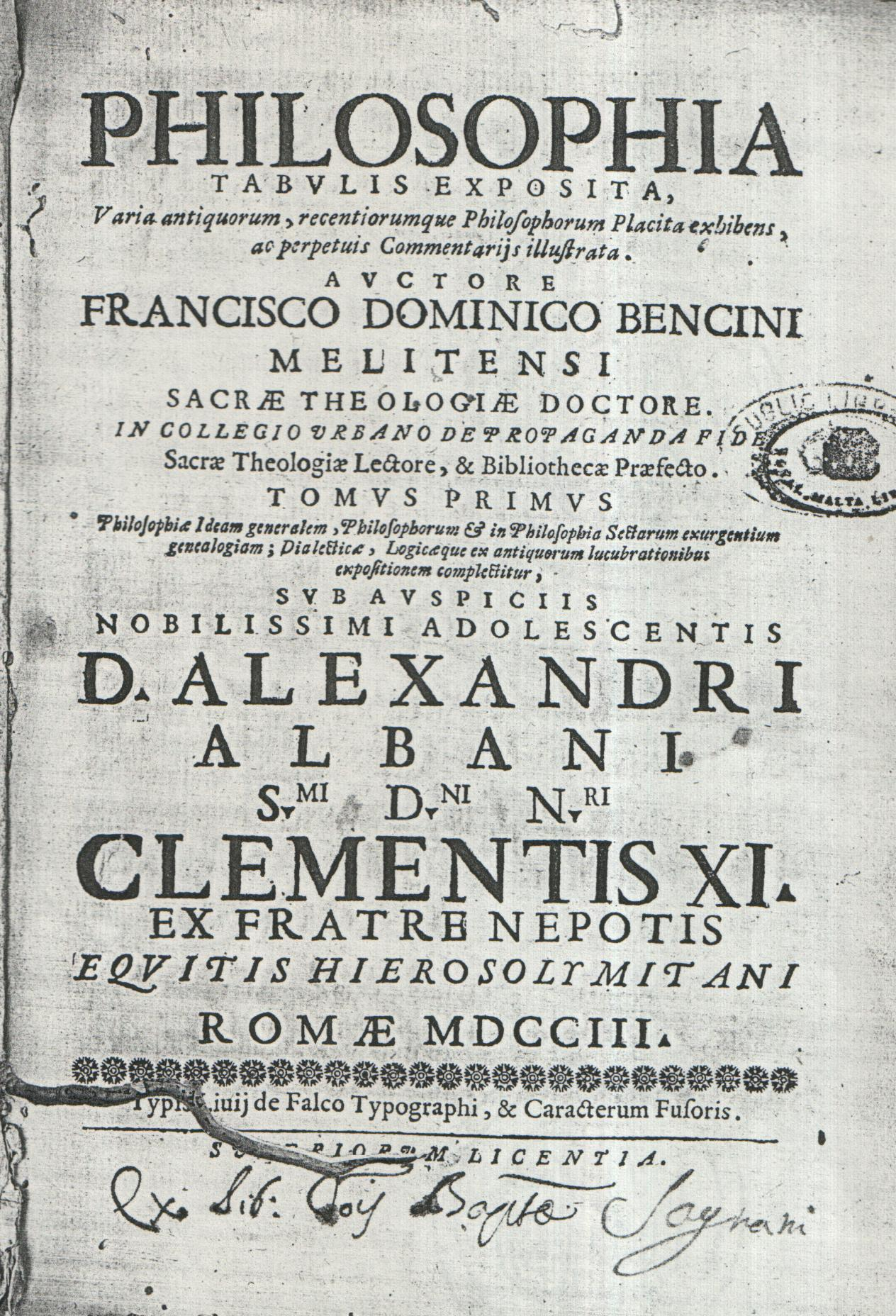
Frontispiece of Bencini’s Philosophia Tabulis Exposita (1703)

=== Main work ===
All of Bencini’s manuscripts remain in the holdings of the University of Turin. Bencini himself published some of his works during his lifetime, otherwise no other manuscripts have ever been published. Most of these works concern themes related to Christian, particularly Catholic apologetics.

Of those published, his Philosophia Tabulis Exposita (1703), from a philosophical point of view, is of special interest. This is a work in Latin, and published in Rome. It carries the sub-title: Varia antiquorum, recentiorumque Philosophorum Placita exhibens, ac perpetius commentarijs illustrata (Illustrations of various known philosophies of ancient and recent times, with each illustration commented).

The book is dedicated to an adolescent boy called Alessandro Albani, the nephew of Pope Clement XI Albani. What follows is a textual format explanation of the work, some general information about the illustrations, the commemorative reason for publishing the work, and the method used for the order of the illustrations.

The predominant book contents are the illustrations, divided into three sections. The first deals with philosophy in general; the second with dialectics; the third with logic. Six illustrations are presented in the first section, seven in the second, and nine in the third. In a systematic order, each illustration is described by an extensive description. The parts dealing with dialectics and logic are basically based on Aristotle. The first section is predominantly concerns classical Greek philosophy.

=== Other works ===
Other published works by Bencini, though not of a philosophical theme, are Præfatio dicta ante disputationem thesium (Preface as an Afterword of a Disputation of Theses; 1687) and Il Concilio di Calcedonia (The Council of Chalcedon; 1715). Both deal with apologetical themes, particularly in reference to reformation.

== See also ==
- Philosophy in Malta
