= Grand motet =

Genre of motet

The grand motet (plural grands motets) was a genre of motet cultivated at the height of the French baroque, although the term dates from later French usage. At the time, due to the stylistic feature of employing two alternating choirs, the works were typically described as motet pour deux choeurs - motet for double choir.

== Form of a grand motet ==
In the context of French baroque music the grand motet primarily contrasted with the petit motet. The first distinction is evident in the name; the grand form was truly grand (big) in proportion calling for double choirs and massed orchestral forces, whereas the petit form was a chamber genre for one or two solo voices, one or two solo instruments, and basso continuo - the basso continuo typically provided by the harpsichord at home or organ in a smaller church. These two French baroque motet types are also very distinct from the medieval motets of Dufay and renaissance motets of Lassus, and the German motet style of J. S. Bach. The French motet type was also connected to, and determined by, the occasion and venue; whereas the grand motet was cultivated at Versailles, the Chapelle royale; the petit motet - unless accompanying a larger event, could also be for private often domestic devotions. The texts varied also; a grand motet was generally a Latin psalm, hymne, Biblical cantique or Dies irae, while the petit motet could be shorter Latin verses from a variety of religious sources.

The grand motet also had a set of stylistic conventions, even if some of the distinctive musical conventions of the grand motet - such as entrusting the initial intonation to a soloist - were not new. The grand motet also had operatic contrast, so a grand motet was a sequence of autonomous numbers (numeros) much like choruses, arias and recitative in Italian than French baroque opera. The operatic effect was a part of the embellishment of the Sun King's splendour.

Although the grand motet was distinct from the early 13th-century motet, bar the use of Latin text, they too combine elements of secular and sacred nature. By incorporating theatrical elements of French spectacle and concerto elements inherited from Italian music, the French grand motet became the archetypal genre of the Versailles style, the "ne plus ultra of French Baroque music." As a grandiose genre, the grand motet "took on the aspects of a sacred concert right from its inception," lacking the liturgical significance of the first motets, serving to signify the grandeur associated with the monarchy.

These grand motets extend and elaborate upon preexisting conventions; they epitomize Versailles style and are lengthier and more musically interesting than their forerunners. The motet Versaillais, which reached its apex under the talent of Michel Richard Delalande, is characterized by its unprecedented length (Lully's Te Deum, for instance, has over 1200 bars) and a sectional structure that incorporates the alternation of a grand choeur with a petit choeur composed of (at least) four soloists.

== From court to concert ==
The first generation of grands motets, the works of Henry Du Mont, were purely royal occasions. However, after the death of Louis XIV the crown became less proprietary with grands motets and the genre, and specifically the works of Delalande, moved into the Concert spirituel from the first concert on 18 March 1725. Composers who may not have often been heard at court wrote grands motets for a new audience.

== The composers ==
Virtually all major, and some minor, composers of the French baroque tried their hand at the genre, but only performance at court or, later, the Concert spirituel conferred approval.

- Jean-Baptiste Lully - produced some very grand, and operatic, grands motets.
- Henry Du Mont - the composer who established the conventions of the genre at the Chapelle royale
- Pierre Robert - not as prolific as Du Mont or later Delalande, but 24 grand motets of Robert were printed by order of the king, in folio with those of Du Mont and some of Lully, in 1684, the year of Robert and Du Mont's retirement.
- Marc-Antoine Charpentier - as prolific as Delalande
- Michel Richard Delalande - as many as 70 grands motets
- Pascal Collasse - mainly lost
- Henri Desmarets - under his own name which survive, and also some, more scandalously, for Nicolas Goupillet, which are lost.
- Charles-Hubert Gervais - 42 grand motets, several received at the Concert spirituel
- François Couperin - the master of the petit genre, Couperin also composed as many as 12 grands motets, all of which are lost.
- Antoine Blanchard - 11 grands motets.
- Sébastien de Brossard - produced several grands motets, but in his role as an important music theorist of the French baroque he ignored any distinction between grands and petits motets in his writing.
- Jean Gilles - 24 surviving grands motets
- André Campra - five published grand motets, one with a marked Italian influence
- Nicolas Bernier - 36 motets "pour l'usage de la Chapelle du Roy" are recorded in his will, but only 11 grands motets have survived. His grands motets and Te Deum were still in the repertoire at the Concert spirituel until the last concert in May 1790, and the French Revolution. His motets feature the five-part chorus doubled by the orchestra, and are harmonically more conservative than those of Charpentier and Delalande.
- Jean-Joseph de Mondonville - the favourite of the Concert spirituel in the years after Delalande, but after the 1740s the interest of the Concert spirituel began to turn to the works of Haydn.
- Jean-Philippe Rameau - only four survive.
