= Paolo Lorenzani =

Italian composer

Paolo Francesco Lorenzani (5 January 1640 – 28 October 1713) was an Italian composer of the Baroque Era. While living in France, he helped promote appreciation for the Italian style of music.

Lorenzani was born in Rome and was trained by Orazio Benevoli, maestro di cappella for the Cappella Giulia in The Vatican.

He served in Rome as maestro di cappella at the Church of the Gesù and Collegio Romano, the first Jesuit university, which later expanded to become Pontifical Gregorian University. He later served at the cathedral of Messina in Sicily.

In 1678, Lorenzani traveled to Paris, hoping to find fortune. His motets were performed for Louis XIV, who recognized his talent and appointed him music master to the queen. Under orders of the king, Lorenzani traveled back to Italy and recruited singers for the monarch's chapel. Despite assistance from Madame de Montespan, he never achieved sufficient popularity to overcome great antagonism from Jean-Baptiste Lully, a great force in French music at the time. Underhanded efforts by Lully probably kept Lorenzani from receiving several available posts at the Chapelle royale in 1683. This setback and the death of the queen marked the beginning of Lorenzani's break with Versailles. Due to his ultramontane beliefs, he was ordered to leave Versailles, thanks to protests made by Lully.

Despite all of that, an Italian Serenade in 1684 proved to be a success, thanks to help from Michel Richard Delalande. In Paris, he earned a post as maître de musique at a Theatines monastery. Here, he conducted his own music in the presence of Italophile aristocrats. In 1688, his opera Oronthée, composed in the French style, premiered at the Académie royale in Chantilly. In 1693, Lorenzani published his Grand Motets, which were dedicated to the king.

He returned to Rome in 1695 and served as maestro di cappella for the Cappella Giulia.
