= Pierre Tabart =

French composer

Pierre Tabart (also Thabart, Tharbart) (Chinon, baptized 8 January 1645 – Meaux, 1716) was a French composer and maître de chapelle. Said to have studied music under 'the best contrapuntist of his time', he served as maître de musique in Orléans until 1683, followed by Senlis from 1683-1689. He then succeeded Nicolas Goupillet as maître de musique of Meaux Cathedral. However, due to the fact that his nine-year contract was left unrenewed, he was succeeded by Sébastien de Brossard in 1699. He later aided his successor to the post in selecting the maître de musique for Évreux Cathedral.
