= Bartolomé de Escobedo =

Spanish composer of the Renaissance

Bartolomé de Escobedo (1515 – August 11, 1563) was a Spanish composer of the Renaissance.

== Biography ==
He was born in Zamora, studied at Salamanca where he was a singer, and in 1536 joined the papal choir in Rome as only the second Spaniard to be admitted after Cristóbal de Morales. He remained in Rome until 1554, interrupted by a short return to his home in 1541-5. When he left the papal choir he returned to Spain, taking a non-resident prebend at the cathedral in Segovia.

He had his share of difficulties while in Rome, mostly due to his short temper and illness. Records from the Vatican, the Diarii Sistini, show that he was fined on two occasions for calling a fellow singer an "ass" and a "fat pig", and that he was inexplicably excommunicated for one day in 1546. Despite this, he was well regarded as a theorist and was famously involved in judging the public debate of 1551 between Nicola Vicentino and Vicenzo Lusitano over the relevance of ancient Greek modes to 16th century music.

Escobedo has been speculated to be the teacher of Tomás Luis de Victoria, but no firm evidence of this has been uncovered.

Of his music only two masses, six motets and one villancico survive.

== Works ==
Masses:

- Missa Ad te levavi (a6)
- Missa Philippus Rex Hispanie (a6)

Motets:

- Domme non secundum (a5)
- Erravi sicut ovis (a4)
- Exurge quare obdormis (a4)
- Hodie completi sunt (a5)
- Immutentur habitu (a4)
- Magna opera Domini (a4)

Villancico:

- Ay, ay, ay, quien se queja (a6)

== References and further reading ==
- Anthony Fiumara, 'Escobedo's Missa Philippus Rex Hispanie: a Spanish descendant of Josquin's Hercules Mass', Early Music, Vol. 28, 2000. pp. 50–62
- Stevenson, Robert (1980). "Bartolomé de Escobedo". In Sadie, Stanley (ed.). The New Grove Dictionary of Music and Musicians. Vol. vi (1st ed.). London: Macmillan. p. 244.
- Gustave Reese, Music in the Renaissance. New York, W.W. Norton & Co., 1954. ISBN 0-393-09530-4
