= Fra Bernardo =

Fra Bernardo is a Vienna-based classical music record label founded by Bernhard Drobig, and specializing in young artists and early music.
