= Falsobordone =

Musical harmonization technique

Falsobordone is a style of recitation found in music from the 15th to the 18th centuries. Most often associated with the harmonization of Gregorian psalm tones, it is based on root position triads and is first known to have appeared in southern Europe in the 1480s.

== Structure of Falsobordone ==
Falsobordoni are made up of two sections, each containing a recitation on one chord, followed by a cadence. Their usage was mostly intended for the singing of vespers psalms, but falsobordone can also be found in Passions, Lamentations, reproaches, litanies, psalms, responses, and settings of the Magnificat.

== Construction and Relationship to Fauxbourdon ==
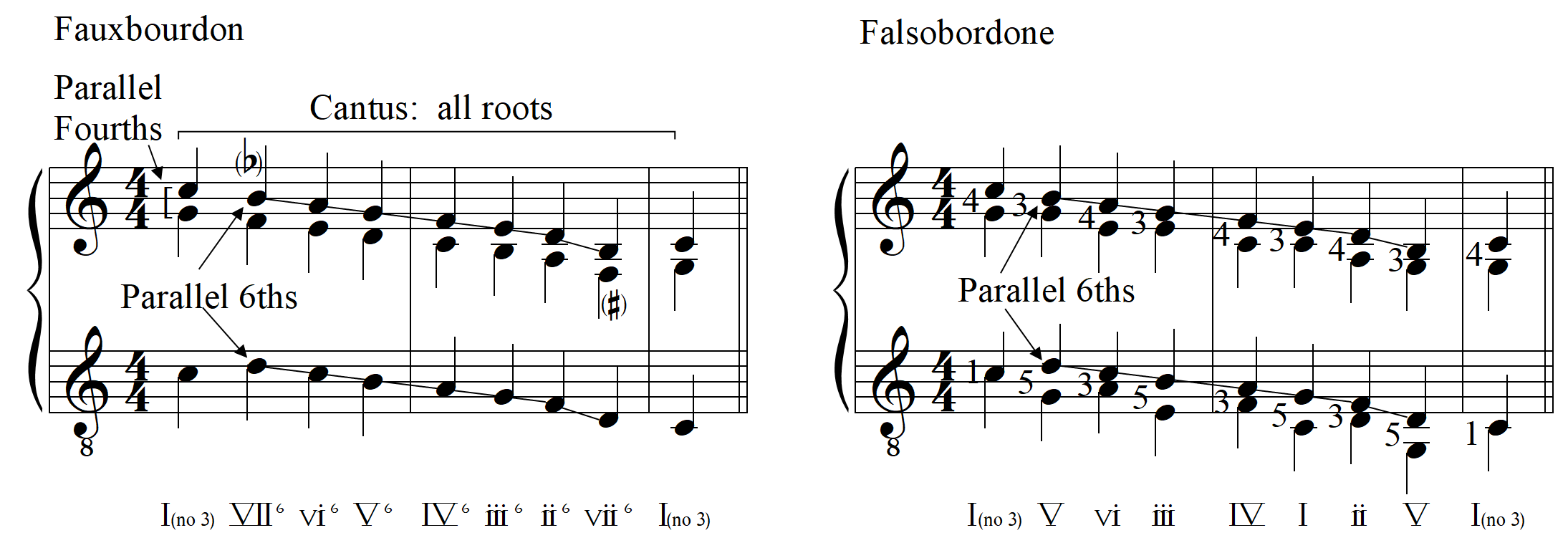
A comparison of fauxbourdon and falsobordone through a hypothetical example applying each technique to a descending scale. Both techniques maintain parallel sixths between the soprano and tenor. However, in fauxbourdon, the countertenor maintains strict parallel fourths below the soprano, while in falsobordone, the fourths alternate with thirds and a bass voice is added, alternating between fifths and thirds. The Roman Numeral/Figured Bass analysis is anachronistic, but demonstrates that while fauxbourdon produces a succession of first-inversion triads in close position, falsobordone produces root-position triads in close position in which the soprano alternately carries the root or the third of the triad. In a descending scale such as this, falsobordone also produces the traditional voice leading of the descending thirds sequence common in tonal music.

There is no consensus on the exact relationship between falsobordone and the etymologically related fauxbourdon, and the historical use of the terms is not consistent. Guilielmus Monachus describes both fauxbourdon (set in three voices) and falsobordone (set in four voices) but calls both modus faulxbordon (or just faulxbordon). Both fauxbourdon and falsobordone seem to have arisen as techniques for improvising a polyphonic setting of a melody; these processes subsequently developed into compositional techniques.

In three voices (fauxbourdon), Guilielmus explains that a soprano voice is added, conceptualized as beginning and ending in unison with the tenor, but otherwise moving in parallel thirds below; this voice is then sung an octave higher than it is conceived, so that the actual intervals produced are octaves at the beginning and end, with parallel sixths everywhere else. A countertenor is also added, beginning and ending a fifth above the tenor, and otherwise moving in strict parallel thirds with the tenor (which consequently consistently maintains strict parallel fourths against the soprano). The resulting structure of all three voices begins and ends with a 1-5-8 chord and elsewhere moves in parallel 1-3-6 chords.

In four voices (falsobordone), Guilielmus also begins with the two-part structure of the soprano and tenor beginning and ending with octaves, elsewhere moving in strict parallel sixths, as in three-part fauxbourdon. But he then explains that the alto voice does not maintain strict parallel thirds above the tenor (parallel fourths below the soprano), but rather alternates between thirds and fourths above the tenor (which is the same as alternating fourths and thirds below the soprano). In addition, a bass voice (he calls it a “bass countertenor”) is added that alternates between a fifth and a third below the tenor. Although he does not say so, the condition that the soprano and tenor have octaves at the beginning and end also implies that the bass should begin and end on a unison and alternate between fifth and third everywhere else. If the two alternating voices (alto and bass) are correctly synchronized, the falsobordone will begin and end on a 1-1-5-8 voicing and will otherwise alternate between 1-5-8-10 and 1-3-5-8 voicings.

== Characteristics of Falsobordone ==
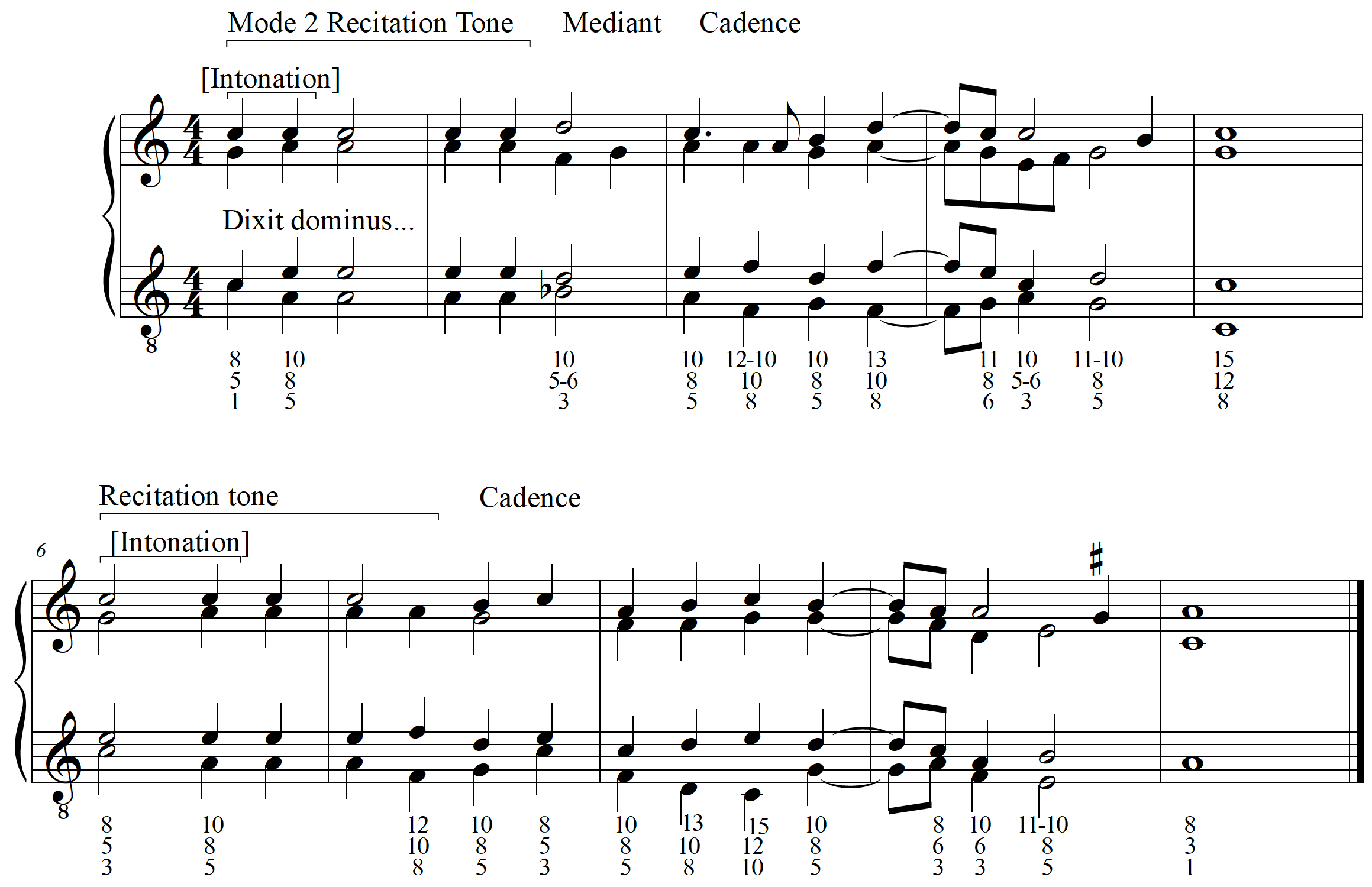
A falsobordone setting of Dixit dominus, originally from Barcelona, Bibl. cent. 454 (f. 177v). Adapted from Trumble, Falsobordone: An Historical Survey, 55. After a single chord change intonation, the falsobordone harmonizes the reciting tone of the second psalm tone, complete with mediant, followed by an elaborate medial cadence. Another single chord intonation leads back to the recitation tone, followed by another elaborate cadence. The recitation and the last few chords of the cadence follow the traditional alternation of chord voicings; the rest is more varied, but are almost entirely root position triads with the upper three voices in close position.

The typical falsobordone may be described in modern terms as a four-part setting of root-position triads in close position (with the root doubled), selected such that the notes in the soprano alternate between the chordal root and third. Additionally, there is a notable tendency for the bass (chordal roots) to move by fifth or fourth. This characteristic arises automatically when the soprano contains the chordal third and rises by step or when soprano contains the root and descends by step; where these conditions are not already present, they can often be induced by progressing to the next chord in the countertenor and bass voices while the soprano and tenor are held obliquely; even in improvised settings, such a procedure is possible, requiring only a cue from a leader.

However, the falsobordone settings that have survived in the manuscript tradition have been carefully composed, and as in fauxbourdon, it is quite unusual for the composed form to hold strictly to the procedure described by Guilielmus. As a result, a composed falsobordone generally does not perfectly display the characteristics described above. In practice, a composed falsobordone does not maintain strict alternation between the chordal third and root in the soprano, and it is common for other voicings to be used that would put the chordal fifth in the soprano (in which case, the bass frequently ends up in unison with the tenor). These liberties allow for even more frequent movement of the bass by fourth and fifth and also allow for more careful control of other kinds of harmonic movement. The bass voice is also freed from its exact relationship to any one upper voice, so that while it still contains the chordal root, it may shift from being in unison with the tenor to being an octave away from the tenor). Occasionally, chords of the sixth (inverted triads) may also be used in composed falsobordone, but root-position triads still predominate.

The strict alternation of 1-5-8-10 and 1-3-5-8 voicings has a particularly valuable property for improvised polyphony: it cannot produce parallel octaves or parallel fifths. In four-part settings of unornamented successions of simple triads, parallel octaves can only occur when the doubled chord tone appears in the same two voices two chords in a row. Since the chords in this strict alternation are always in root position and the root is always doubled, one of the doubling voices is always the bass; parallel octaves could only occur if the octave of the bass appears in the same upper voice in both voicings, which it does not. Similarly, under the same conditions, parallel fifths could only occur if the fifth were in the same voice in both voicings, which it is not. Thus, strictly applying Guilielmus’ rules makes forbidden parallels impossible, even without preplanning the harmony.

Authentic, composed falsobordone is usually applied to recitations. The chord may change after the first beat or so, in the manner of an intonation, but otherwise, a single chord will be repeated several times, corresponding to the recitation tone. The recitation is followed by an elaborate cadence in which the chord changes every beat, more or less in the manner described above, but rarely in an absolutely strict alternation of 1-3-5-8 and 1-5-8-10 voicings.

== Similarity to Tonal Harmony ==
Guilielmus is quite specific that the phrase should be set in such a way that the second last chord should be of the form with a fifth between bass and tenor (and therefore with the soprano a tenth above the bass). Since most tenors (cantus firmi, traditional chant melodies) would have ended with a descending step to the finalis (the tonal center of a mode, comparable to a tonic), the bass voice would consequently approach the finalis from a fourth below, resulting in a chord succession that anticipates the dominant–tonic relationship that would govern later music. Relative to tonal music, this ending could be described as a Perfect Authentic Cadence, with the soprano ascending from the leading tone to the tonic. However, the other typical form of the Perfect Authentic Cadence, with the soprano descending to the tonic from the supertonic, cannot be created from a strict alternation of 1-5-8-10 and 1-3-5-8 because the supertonic forms the fifth of the dominant chord in that paradigm, and neither of these voicings contains the fifth in the soprano. Such a cadence would be theoretically possible in composed falsobordoni, since a strict alternation is not necessary in such compositions, but this cadence paradigm is not typical in historical falsobordoni because of the strong tendency for the descending step to be placed in the tenor in Renaissance polyphony.

Falsobordone also anticipates other chord progressions typical in tonal harmony. For example, the harmonization of a descending scale with the strict alternation of 1-5-8-10 and 1-3-5-8 voicings generates the traditional voice leading of the descending thirds sequence that famously forms the basis of Johann Pachelbel's Canon in D; this sequence can be seen in the hypothetical falsobordone example provided above (in the section “Construction and Relationship to Fauxbourdon”).
