= Sébastien Daucé =

Sébastien Daucé is a French conductor, born in Rennes (France) on 4 June 1980. He is artistic director and founder of Ensemble Correspondances, formed from alumni of the Conservatoire National Supérieur de Musique de Lyon.

It was during his training at the Conservatoire National Supérieur de Musique de Lyon that he met the future members of Correspondances. Key influences among his teachers there were Françoise Lengellé and Yves Rechsteiner. Initially in demand as a continuo player and vocal répétiteur (with the Pygmalion ensemble, the Festival d’Aix en Provence, and the Maîtrise and Orchestre Philharmonique de Radio France among others), he formed the Correspondances ensemble in Lyon in 2009, assembling around him singers and instrumentalists with a passion for the French sacred repertory of the Grand Siècle.

With this ensemble, which he directs from the harpsichord or the organ, he now travels throughout France and around the world, and frequently broadcasts on radio. Sébastien Daucé and Correspondances are in residence at the Théâtre de Caen, where they developed their first staged projects (Trois Femmes directed by Vincent Huguet in 2016, Le Ballet Royal de la Nuit directed by Francesca Lattuada in November 2017), and are associate artists at the Centre Culturel de Rencontre d’Ambronay, at the Opéra and Chapelle of the Château de Versailles, and at La Chapelle de la Trinité with the support of the Ville de Lyon.

Significant stages in the ensemble's career have been tours to Japan, Colombia, the United States and China, alongside regular appearance in Europe (the United Kingdom, Germany, Benelux, Italy, Poland). Its exploration of a little-performed and often unpublished repertory has led, with the support of the harmonia mundi label, a pioneer of the Baroque repertory in many respects, to a discography of eleven recordings that have attracted considerable press attention and have received such distinctions as the Diapason d’Or of the Year, ffff de Télérama, Editor's Choice in Gramophone, ‘Choc’ of the Year in Classica, German Record Critics’ Award and IRR Outstanding.

Correspondances now enjoys international recognition: at the ECHO Preis ceremony in the Berlin Konzerthaus in 2016, it won the award categories of Best World Premiere Recording (for Le Concert Royal de la Nuit) and Best Young Conductor of the Year, while the Australian Limelight magazine named it Operatic Recording of 2016 for Le Concert Royal de la Nuit.

Alongside his activities as a performing musician, Sébastien Daucé works with the leading scholars of seventeenth-century music, publishing regular articles and taking part in important performance practice projects. Passionately interested in questions of musical style, he edits the music that makes up the ensemble's repertory, going so far as to recompose complete pieces when necessary, as was the case in Le Ballet Royal de la Nuit. He has taught at the Pôle Supérieur de Paris since 2012. In 2018 he is guest artistic director of the London Festival of Baroque Music. Sébastien Daucé is also an associate artist of the Fondation Royaumont.

== Discography ==
  - 2010 : Marc-Antoine Charpentier, "O Maria", Psaumes et Motets.1 CD Zig-Zag Territoires (Choc Classica, Coup de cœur de l'Académie Charles-Cros)
  - 2011 : Antoine Boësset, "L'Archange et le Lys", Messe et Motets 1 CD Zig-Zag Territoires.
  - 2013 : Marc-Antoine Charpentier, Litanies de la Vierge H.83, Miserere H.193, Motets pour la maison de Guise . 1 CD Harmonia Mundi (Choc de l'année 2013 Classica, Diapason d'Or, ffff Télérama, Pizzicato Supersonic).
  - 2014 : Étienne Moulinié, Meslanges pour la chapelle d'un Prince, pièces du recueil Meslanges de sujets chrestiens, cantiques, litanies et motets (1658. 1 CD Harmonia Mundi. Choc Classica, Gramophone Editor's Choice, ***** Diapason.
  - 2015 : Michel-Richard de Lalande, Leçons de Ténèbres. 1 CD Harmonia Mundi. Choc Classica, ffff Télérama, Diapason d'Or.
  - 2015 : Le Concert Royal de la Nuit. 2 CD Harmonia Mundi. Choc Classica, ffff Télérama, Gramophone Editor's Choice, Diapason d'Or de l'année 2015, Limelight Opera Recording of the Year, Echo Preis World Premiere Recording of the Year.
  - 2016 : Henry du Mont, "O Mysterium", Motets & Élévations. 1 CD Harmonia Mundi
  - 2016 : Marc-Antoine Charpentier, Pastorale de Noël, 1 CD Harmonia Mundi
  - 2017 : Marc-Antoine Charpentier. La Descente d'Orphée aux Enfers, 1 CD Harmonia Mundi
  - 2018 : "Perpetual Night", Airs anglais du XVIIe siècle. 1 CD Harmonia Mundi. Prix de la Critique allemande du disque, Diapason d'Or de l'année 2018.
  - 2018 : Le Ballet royal de la Nuit,, complete danses, stage Director, Francesca Lattuada. 3 CD + 1 DVD Harmonia Mundi.
  - 2019 : Marc-Antoine Charpentier, Histoires Sacrées 2 CD + 1 DVD Harmonia Mundi 2019. Diapason d’or, Choc de Classica, ffff Télérama, Diamant d'Opéra Magazine. ***** Limeligt Magazine.
  - 2019 : Les Plaisirs du Louvre, Airs pour La Chambre de Louis XIII. 1 CD Harmonia Mundi
  - 2020 : Marc-Antoine Charpentier, Messe à 4 choeurs H.4. 1 CD Harmonia Mundi 2020. Diapasond'or
  - 2022 : Michel-Richard de Lalande, Grands Motets, Dies Irae S31, Miserere S27, Veni creator S14. 1 CD HARMONIA Mundi
  - 2023 : Marc-Antoine Charpentier, Messe de minuit H.9 + (H.416, H.421, H.44, H.531-2, H.534-3, H.147). 1 CD Harmonia Mundi
