= Charles d'Helfer =

French composer

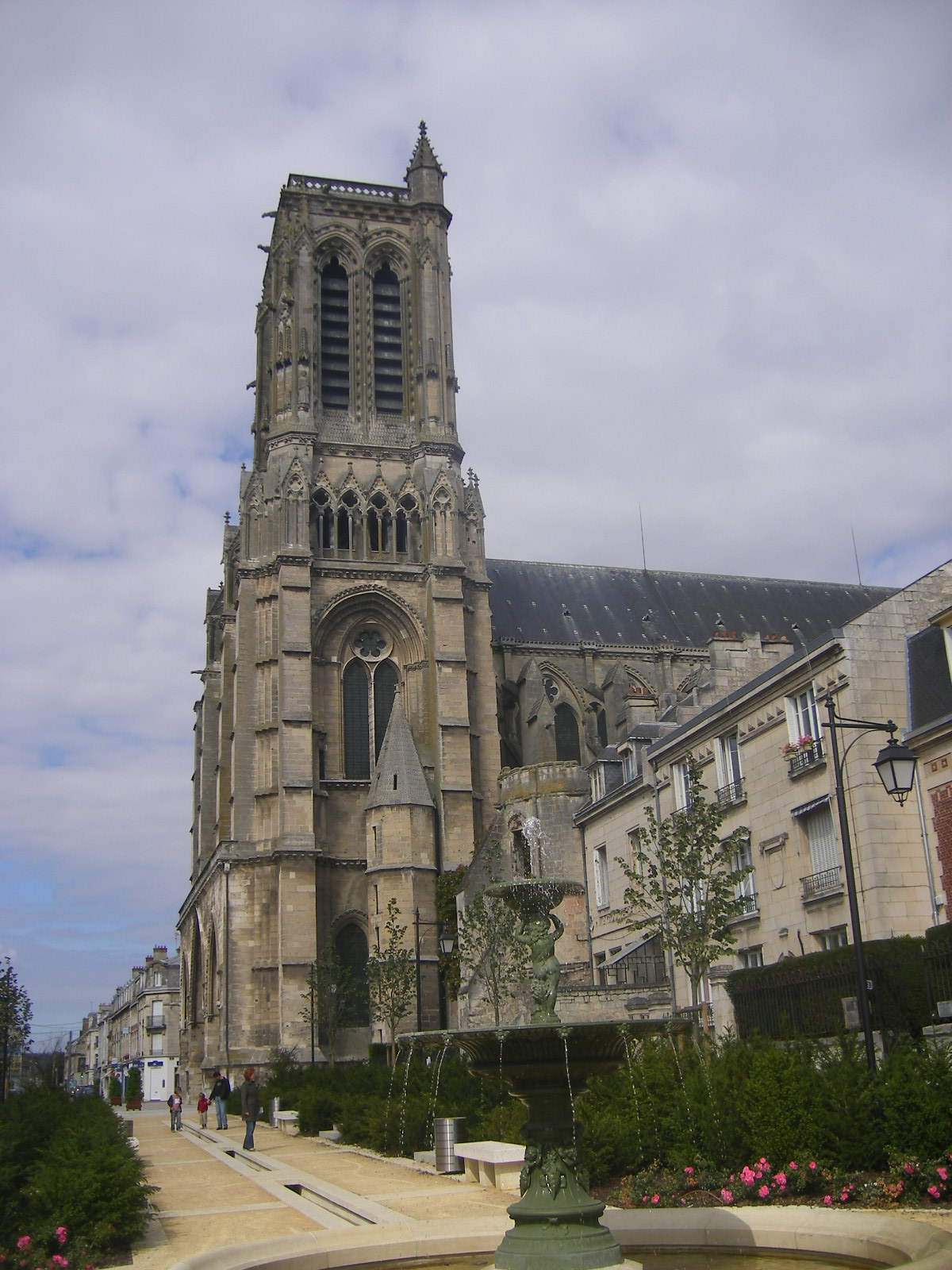
Soissons Cathedral

Charles d'Helfer (1598–1661) was a French baroque composer and maître de musique at Soissons Cathedral. His masses follow a strict one syllable per note style.

He is best remembered for his requiem for four voices of 1656 which was used for the funeral of composer Michel Richard Delalande in 1726 and was the basis of Julien-Amable Mathieu (1734-1811) and François Giroust's requiem mass for Louis XV in 1775.

== Works ==
- Missa quatuor vocum ad imitationem moduli Benedicam Dominum, Paris 1653
- Missa pro defunctis quatuor vocum, Paris 1656
- Missa quatuor vocum ad moduli Lorsque d'un désir curieux, Paris 1658
- Missa sex vocum ad imitationem moduli In aeternum cantabo, Paris 1658
- Vespres et Hymnes de l'année avec plusieurs motets du St. Sacrement, de la Vierge des SS. et patrons de lieux etc à 4 parties, Paris 1660
- Missa quatuor vocum ad imitationem moduli Deliciae Regum, Paris 1664
- Missa sex vocum ad imitationem moduli Quid videbis in Sunamitae, Paris 1674
- Missa quatuor vocibus ad imitationem moduli Laetatus sum, Paris 1678

== Recordings ==
- Requiem, with funeral oration for Charles III, Duke of Lorraine (d.1608). A Sei Voci. 1994

== Sources ==
Jean-Paul C. Montagnier, The Polyphonic Mass in France, 1600-1780: The Evidence of the Printed Choirbooks, Cambridge: Cambridge University Press, 2017.
