= Stefano Fabri =

Italian composer

Stefano Fabri (c. 1560 – 1609, or Fabbri, Stefano Fab(b)ri senior) was an Italian composer, organist and furthermore he was known to play the trombone. He succeeded Ruggiero Giovanelli as maestro di cappella of the Cappella Giulia at Saint Peter's Basilica in Rome.

== Family and background ==
He was born in Orvieto as the son of the flemish musician Franceso Fabri, who also had been his first teacher of music. His son Stefano Fabri jr. had been the teacher of Francesco Beretta - also a director of music at the Vatican.

== Biography ==
His career began at the cathedral of his birth place in Orvieto. First, he was a singer but he also played the organ and the trombone later on. In 1599, he left his position in Orvieto to succeed Ruggiero Giovanelli, but they also seem to have been co-workers. He kept this employment until 1601. In 1601-1607, he worked at the Lateran and then, he advanced to be the director of music at S. Loreto. Besides his function also a director of music at the Vatican, the Lateran and S. Loreto, where he stayed until the end of his life, he also composed for San Luigi dei Francesi and Santa Maria Maggiore. His burial place is near to S. Loreto.

== Works ==
He was well-known as a capable couterpointist. He composed antiphones (Codice n.42, Cappella Giulia XV 62). Further examples are:

- Litaniae lauretanae
- A poco a poco more, a secular piece of music in Musica di diversi eccellentissimi musici by Angelo Gardano (1604)

As an example of his composition is to be found at the Bibliotheque nationale de France, Gallica:

- https://gallica.bnf.fr/ark:/12148/btv1b103157524.image, Tu es Petrus. Motteta à 8 [2 chori a 4 v. con organo] del sigr. Stefano Fabri, maestrodi cappella in S. Luigi di Francesi in Rom
