= Petit motet =

Baroque-era domestic sacred chamber music genre

The petit motet ("little motet") was a genre of domestic sacred chamber music popular in France during the baroque era. It was the sacred counterpart of the secular cantata, and small-scale counterpart of the grand motet.
