= Charles-Henri de Blainville =

French musician and music theorist

Charles-Henri de Blainville (1711–1769 [or after 1771]) was a French composer, cellist, pedagogue and music theorist.

== Biography ==
The birthplace of Charles-Henri de Blainville remains uncertain. François-Joseph Fétis wrote that he came from Tours, which all the other biographers have copied. In the preface of his Sonatas Op. 1 of 1740 is mentioned "By Mr. Blainville de Roüen". Blainville entered the service of the Marquise de Villeroy. He wrote vocal and instrumental works which had little success. In 1751, he made himself known by affirming that there existed a "third mode" between minor and major. He wrote two theoretical works: L'Esprit de l'art musical ou réflexions sur la musique and L'Histoire générale, critique et philosophie de la musique.

He died in Paris.

== Works (selection) ==
Operas

- Thésée, opera (lost)
- Miadas, one-act heroic comedy (Paris, 1753) (lost)

Orchestral music

- Symphonie à double quatuor, presented at the Concert Spirituel in 1741, lost
- Six simphonies, Op. 1, c. 1750
- Six simphonies, Op. 2, c. 1750

Chamber music

- Six sonates en trio, for two violins or two flutes and bass, Op. 1 (c. 1740)
- Premier livre de sonates pour le dessus de viole (c. 1750)
1. in D major
2. in G major
3. in F major
4. in B minor
5. in A major
6. in G major
- Second livre de sonates à deux violoncelles (c. 1750)

Sacred music

- Les Secondes leçons ténèbres (Paris, 1759)

Secular vocal music

- La Prise de Berg op Zoom (Paris, 1751)
- Le Dépit amoureux (Paris, c. 1755)
- Ode, text by Jean-Jacques Rousseau, for male voice and double bass, presented at the Concert Spirituel in 1757
- Récueil des récréations lyriques, for two voices, with accompaniment of violin and cello (Paris, 1771), lost

== Writings ==
- 1751: Charles Henri de Blainville, Essai sur un troisième mode
- 1754: Charles Henri de Blainville, L'Esprit de l'art musical ou réflexions sur la musique (Geneva: Minkoff, 1975); ISBN 2-8266-0596-8
- 1767: Charles Henri de Blainville, Histoire générale, critique et philosophie de la musique, Le Grand livre du mois (1972) ISBN 2-286-60304-9

== Bibliography ==
- "Blainville" in the Dictionnaire de la musique en France aux XVIIe and XVIIIe siècles (Paris: Fayard, 1992); ISBN 2-213-02824-9
