= Michel Richard Delalande =

French composer and organist (1657–1726)

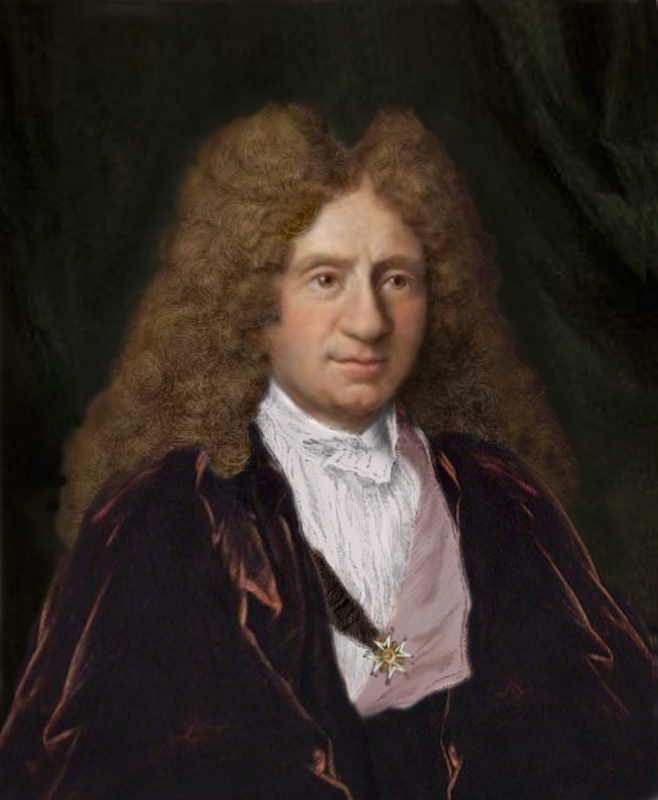
- Delelande portrayed wearing the insignia of the order of Saint-Michel, with which he was conferred in 1722, but his features appear much as they were two decades earlier
- Born: 15 December 1657; Paris, Kingdom of France
- Died: 18 June 1726 (aged 68); Paris
- Era: Baroque

Michel Richard Delalande [de Lalande] (French pronunciation: [dəlalɑ̃d]; 15 December 1657 – 18 June 1726) was a French Baroque composer and organist who was in the service of King Louis XIV. He was one of the most important composers of grands motets. He also wrote orchestral suites known as Simphonies pour les Soupers du Roy and ballets.

== Biography ==
Born in Paris, he was a contemporary of Jean-Baptiste Lully and François Couperin. Delalande taught music to the daughters of Louis XIV, and was director of the French chapel royal from 1714 until his death at Versailles in 1726.

Delalande was arguably the greatest composer of French grands motets, a type of sacred work that was more pleasing to Louis XIV because of its pomp and grandeur, written for soloists, choir and comparatively large orchestra. According to tradition, Louis XIV organized a contest between composers, giving them the same sacred text and time to compose the musical setting. He alone was the judge. Delalande was one of four winners assigned to compose sacred music for each quarter of the year (the other composers being Coupillet, Collasse and Minoret). Delalande's was the most important quarter of the year because of the Christmas holiday. Later he had full responsibility for the church music for the complete year. At his death, since he left no mass of his own, the 1656 requiem of the Dukes of Lorraine by Charles d'Helfer was sung.

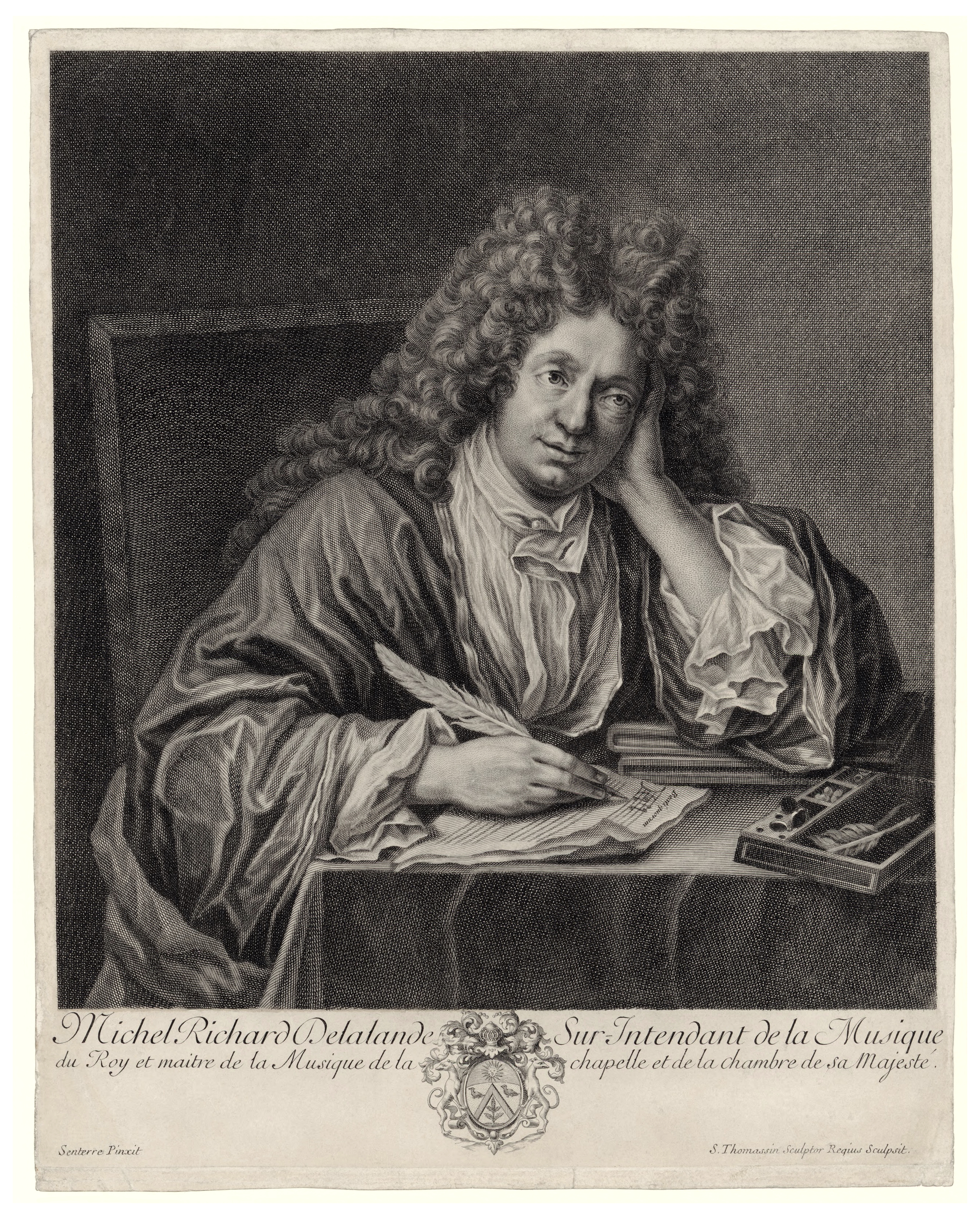
The composer, after painting by Jean-Baptiste Santerre, engraving by Thomassin

== Works ==
Delalande left many versions of his works. His earlier versions show adherence to French Baroque style, but the later revisions incorporate more Italian melismatic lines and greater attention to polyphonic counterpoint.

Also, at least four collections of his works exist, each displaying different looks at composer's work as viewed by the people who assembled each collection.

Scholarship of Delalande's work was for many years hindered because of inconsistencies in the spelling of his last name: de Lalande, Lalande, la Lande, de la Lande, and others. The family wrote the name as 'Delalande'. Finally, in 2006 the definitive "Thematic Catalogue of the Works of Michel-Richard de Lalande (1657-1726)" by noted British musicologist Lionel Sawkins came out which runs to 752 pages containing over 3,000 music examples and details of performing requirements and of all source materials, as well as with comprehensive indexes and thematic locators.

Vocal

- grands motets - Latin settings of psalms including Delalande's Te Deum (1684).
- petits motets - shorter Latin settings for a few vocal and instrumental soloists and continuo, including élévations on an eucharistic text sung at the elevation of the communion wafers.

Instrumental Delalande was an expert organist and harpsichordist, and yet has left not a single note of keyboard music.

- ritournelles - twelve substantial ritournelles for François Fossard and André Danican Philidor's book of Airs italiens (1695). For example, Delalande supplies a 31-bar-long ritournelle for two violins and continuo composed before 'Giurai di non amar' an aria from Domenico Freschi's Olimpia vendicata of 1681.

== Selected recordings ==
- Symphonies pour les soupers du Roy. Hugo Reyne (HMA) 1990
- Les Folies de Cardenio. Christophe Coin (Laborie) - court ballet, "The Insanities of Cardenio", after Cervantes. 2004
- Grands Motets : Te Deum, Confitebor, Super Flumina. Christie (HMA) 1991
- Grands Motets : De Profundis, Miserere, Confitebor tibi. Higginbottom (Erato) 1990
- Grands Motets : Dies Irae. Miserere. Herreweghe (HMC901352) 1991
- Grands Motets : Beati quorum. Quam dilecta. Audite caeli. Schneebeli (Virgin) 2002
- Grands Motets : Deus noster refugium Ps.46. Exaltabo te Domine. Le Parlement de Musique. Martin Gester (Opus 111) 2001
- Grands Motets : Regina coeli. De Profundis. Cantate Domino. Skidmore (ASV) 1995
- Petits motets: Miserere à voix seule. Vanum est vobis. Gens, Piau, Christie (HMT) 1992
- 3 Leçons de Ténèbres 1730. Desrochers (Astree) 1996
