= Cappella Giulia =

Choir of St. Peter's Basilica

The Cappella Giulia, officially the Cappella Musicale Giulia della Basilica Papale di San Pietro (English: Julian Cappella of the Papal Basilica of Saint Peter), is the choir of St. Peter's Basilica that sings for all solemn functions of the Vatican Chapter, such as Holy Mass, Lauds, and Vespers, except when these are celebrated by the Pope, when the Sistine Chapel Choir sings instead. The choir has played an important role as an interpreter and a proponent of Gregorian chant and sacred polyphony.

== History ==
Pope Gregory I (590–604) is credited with establishing the first papal schola cantorum at the Basilica of St. Peter, after the model of the guild-like papal schola at St. John Lateran. This choir remained in Rome during the Avignon Papacy (1309–1378) and was merged with the Avignon papal choir upon the Pope's return to Rome. Sixtus IV (1471–1484) transferred all papal functions and the papal choir to his newly built chapel, now known as the Sistine Chapel, while providing for a small choir of eight singers for the chapter functions at St. Peter's. On 19 February 1512, Julius II (1503–1513) issued a Bull completely reorganizing the Vatican capella (hence the name "Julia" in Latin, "Giulia" in Italian). He enlarged its revenue and its size to twelve men and twelve boys, so that it could serve as a sort of preparatory school for the papal choir, on the plan of the ancient schola.

Among the Cappella Giulia's choir masters were esteemed names such as Giovanni Pierluigi da Palestrina (1551–1554 and 1571–1594), Giovanni Animuccia, Francesco Soriano, Stefano Fabri, Orazio Benevoli, Domenico Scarlatti, Niccolò Jommelli, Pietro Raimondi, Salvatore Meluzzi, and Niccolò Antonio Zingarelli.

The capella was disbanded in 1980 and replaced temporarily by a choir directed by the Spanish Monsignor Pablo Colino Paulis (Magister ad nutum) to continue to perform the key functions of the previous choir. In this new choir, called the Musical Chapel of the Sacrosanct Patriarchal Vatican Basilica, unlike the previous capella, the boy choristers were replaced by female voices, when they sang on major holidays (Easter, Christmas, and Saints Peter and Paul). In 2006 the choir was again reorganized, retaining the addition of women's voices, under the current choir master, the Canadian Father Pierre Paul, O.M.V. In May 2008 the original title "Cappella Giulia" was newly restored by the Vatican Chapter, and Rev. Pierre Paul was officially appointed as Choir master (Magister ad nutum Capituli) with a formal act. "

On 7 April 1994, the Cappella Giulia participated in the Papal Concert to Commemorate the Shoah with the Royal Philharmonic Orchestra conducted by Gilbert Levine in the Sala Nervi at the Vatican. The concert was broadcast throughout the world.

== See also ==
- Index of Vatican City-related articles
