= Tuscany =

Region of Italy

Tuscany Toscana (Italian)
- Region
- Flag Coat of arms

- Map of Tuscany in Italy
- Coordinates: 43.45°N 11.20°E
- Country: Italy
- Capital: Florence

Government
  - Type: Presidential system
  - Body: Regional Cabinet
  - President: Eugenio Giani (PD)
  - Legislature: Regional Council

Area
  - Total: 22,987.04 km^{2} (8,875.35 sq mi)

Population (2026)
  - Total: 3,659,222
  - Rank: 9th
  - Density: 159.1863/km^{2} (412.2906/sq mi)
- Demonym(s): English: Tuscan; Italian: toscano (masculine); Italian: toscana (feminine)

Citizenship
  - Italian: 90%

GDP
  - Total: €143.563 billion (2024)
  - Per capita: €39,257 (2024)
- Time zone: UTC+1 (CET)
  - Summer (DST): UTC+2 (CEST)
- ISO 3166 code: IT-52
- HDI (2022): 0.921 very high • 6th of 21
- NUTS Region: ITI1
- Website: www.regione.toscana.it

Tuscany (/ˈtʌskəni/ TUSK-ə-nee; Italian: Toscana [tosˈkaːna]) is a region of central Italy. With a population of 3,659,222 in an area of 22,987.04 square kilometres (8,875.35 square miles), it is the 9th most populous and 5th-largest region of Italy. The capital and largest city is Florence.

Tuscany is known for its landscapes, history, artistic legacy, and influence on high culture. It is regarded as the birthplace of the Italian Renaissance and of the foundations of the Italian language. The prestige established by Tuscan's use in literature by Dante Alighieri, Petrarch, Giovanni Boccaccio, Niccolò Machiavelli, and Francesco Guicciardini led to its adoption as the basis for elaboration of the language of culture throughout Italy. It has been home to many figures influential in the history of art and science, and contains well-known museums such as the Uffizi and the Palazzo Pitti. Tuscany is also known for its wines, including Chianti, Vino Nobile di Montepulciano, Morellino di Scansano, Brunello di Montalcino, and white Vernaccia di San Gimignano. Having a strong linguistic and cultural identity, it is sometimes considered "a nation within a nation".

Tuscany is the second-most-popular Italian region for travelers in Italy, after Veneto. The main tourist spots are Florence, Pisa, San Gimignano, Siena and Lucca. Castiglione della Pescaia is the most visited seaside destination in the region, with seaside tourism accounting for approximately 40% of tourist arrivals. The Maremma region, the Chianti, Versilia, and Val d'Orcia are also internationally renowned and particularly popular among travelers.

Eight Tuscan localities have been designated World Heritage Sites: the historic Centre of Florence (1982); the Cathedral square of Pisa (1987); the historical centre of San Gimignano (1990); the historical centre of Siena (1995); the historical centre of Pienza (1996); the Val d'Orcia (2004), the Medici Villas and Gardens (2013), and Montecatini Terme as part of the Great Spa Towns of Europe (2021). Tuscany has over 120 protected nature reserves, making Tuscany and its capital Florence popular tourist destinations. In 2018, Florence alone had over 5 million arrivals, making it the world's 51st most visited city.

== History ==
=== Apennine, Proto-Villanovan and Villanovan culture ===
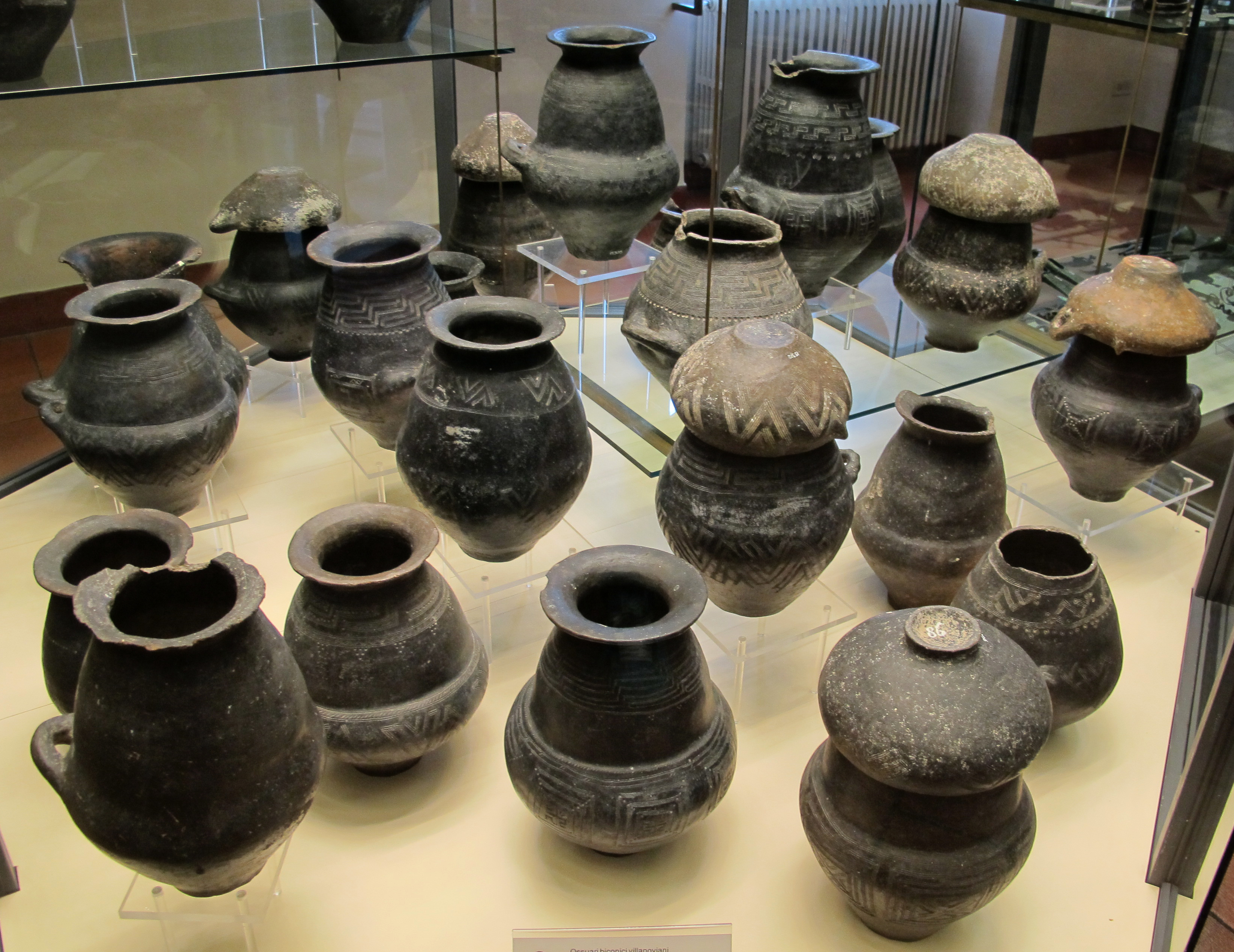
Cinerary urns of the Villanovan culture

The pre-Etruscan history of the area in the middle and late Bronze parallels that of the archaic Greeks. The Tuscan area was inhabited by peoples of the so-called Apennine culture in the second millennium BC (c. 1400 – c. 1150 BC) who had trading relationships with the Minoan and Mycenaean civilizations in the Aegean Sea, and, at the end of the Bronze Age, by peoples of the so-called Proto-Villanovan culture (c. 1100 – c. 900 BC) part of the central European Urnfield culture system. Following this, at the beginning of the Iron Age, the Villanovan culture (c. 900 – c. 700 BC), regarded as the oldest phase of Etruscan civilization, saw Tuscany, and the rest of Etruria, taken over by chiefdoms. City-states developed in the late Villanovan (paralleling Greece and the Aegean) before "Orientalization" occurred.

=== Etruscans ===
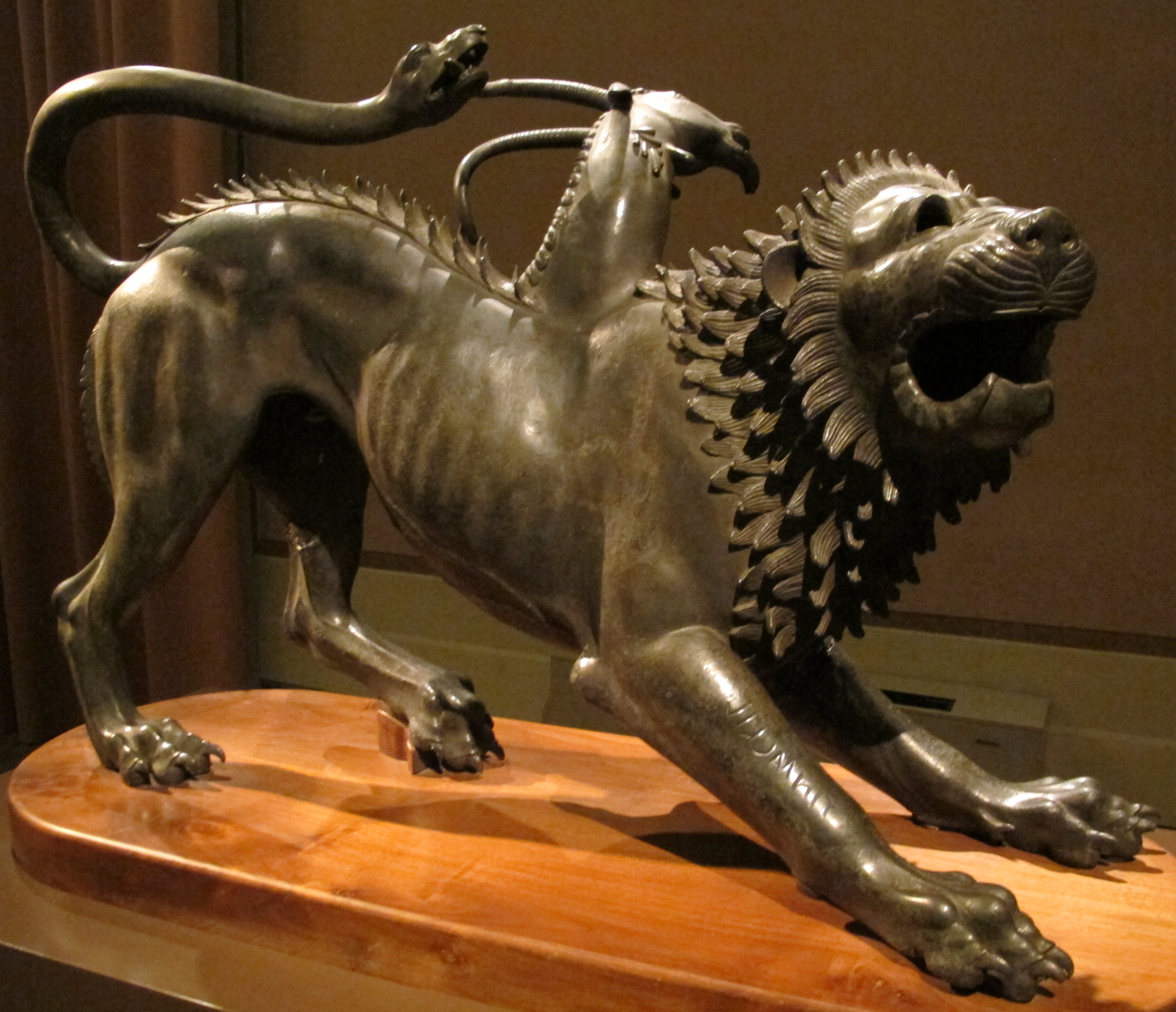
The Chimera of Arezzo, Etruscan bronze, 400 BC

The Etruscans (Latin: Tusci) created the first major civilization in this region, large enough to establish a transport infrastructure, to implement agriculture and mining and to produce vibrant art. The Etruscans lived in the area of Etruria well into prehistory. The civilization grew to fill the area between the Arno and Tiber from the tenth century BCE, reaching its peak during the seventh and sixth centuries B.C., finally succumbing to the Romans by the first century BCE. From the Etruscans, Tuscany took the name of Etruria, Tuscia for the Romans and subsequently Tuscania and Tuscany. The areas of north-western Tuscany were inhabited by the ancient Ligures. In northwestern Tuscany, the area between the Arno and Magra rivers was culturally aligned with the Etruscans in the early Iron Age, and came under Ligurian control in the late Iron Age.

One reason for the eventual demise of this civilization was the increasing absorption by surrounding cultures, including the adoption of the Etruscan upper class by the Romans.

=== Romans ===
Soon after absorbing Etruria (to the north, northeast, east, and a strip to the south), Rome established the cities of Lucca, Pisa, Siena, and Florence, endowed the area with new technologies and development, and ensured peace. These developments included extensions of existing roads, the introduction of aqueducts and sewers, and the construction of many buildings, both public and private. However, many of these structures have been destroyed by erosion due to weather.

The Roman civilization in the West of the Roman Republic and later Roman Empire collapsed in the fifth century, and the region fell briefly to barbarians migrating through the Empire from Eastern Europe and Central Asia of the Goths (Eastern – Ostrogoths and Western – Visigoths), then was re-conquered by the revived Eastern Roman Empire (later Byzantine Empire) under the Emperor Justinian. In the years following 572, the Lombards arrived and designated Lucca the capital of their subsequent Tuscia.

=== Medieval period ===
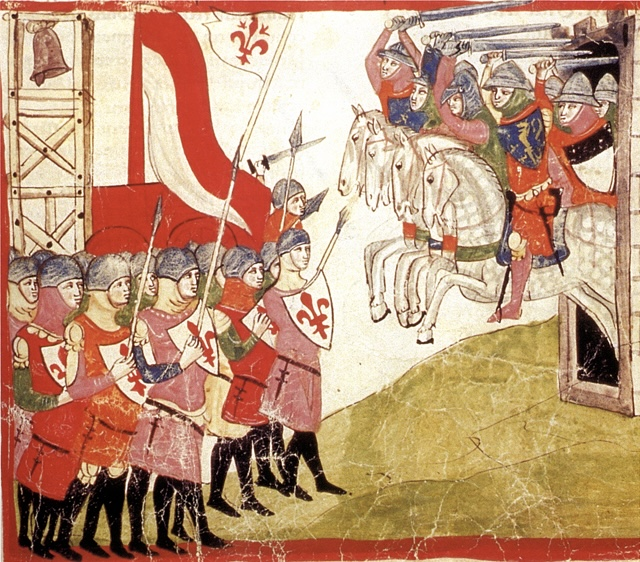
Battle of Montaperti, 1260

Pilgrims travelling along the Via Francigena between Rome and France brought wealth and development during the medieval period. The food and shelter required by these travellers fuelled the growth of communities around churches and taverns. The conflict between the Guelphs and Ghibellines, factions supporting the Papacy or the Holy Roman Empire in central and northern Italy during the 12th and 13th centuries, split the Tuscan people. The two factions gave rise to several powerful and rich medieval communes in Tuscany: Arezzo, Florence, Lucca, Pisa, and Siena. Balance between these communes was ensured by the assets they held: Pisa, a port; Siena, banking; and Lucca, banking and silk. But by the time of the Renaissance, Florence had become the cultural capital of Tuscany.

One family that benefitted from Florence's growing wealth and power was the ruling Medici family. Its scion Lorenzo de' Medici was one of the most famous of the Medici. The legacy of his influence is visible today in the prodigious expression of art and architecture in Florence. His famous descendant Catherine de' Medici married Prince Henry (later King Henry II) of France in 1533.

The Black Death epidemic hit Tuscany starting in 1348. It eventually killed 70% of the Tuscan population. According to Melissa Snell, "Florence lost a third of its population in the first six months of the plague, and from 45% to 75% of its population in the first year." In 1630, Florence and Tuscany were once again ravaged by the plague.

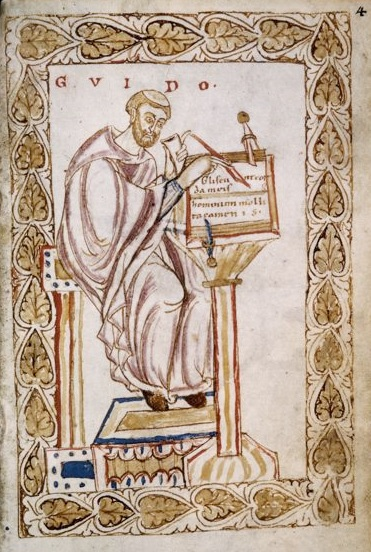
Guido of Arezzo

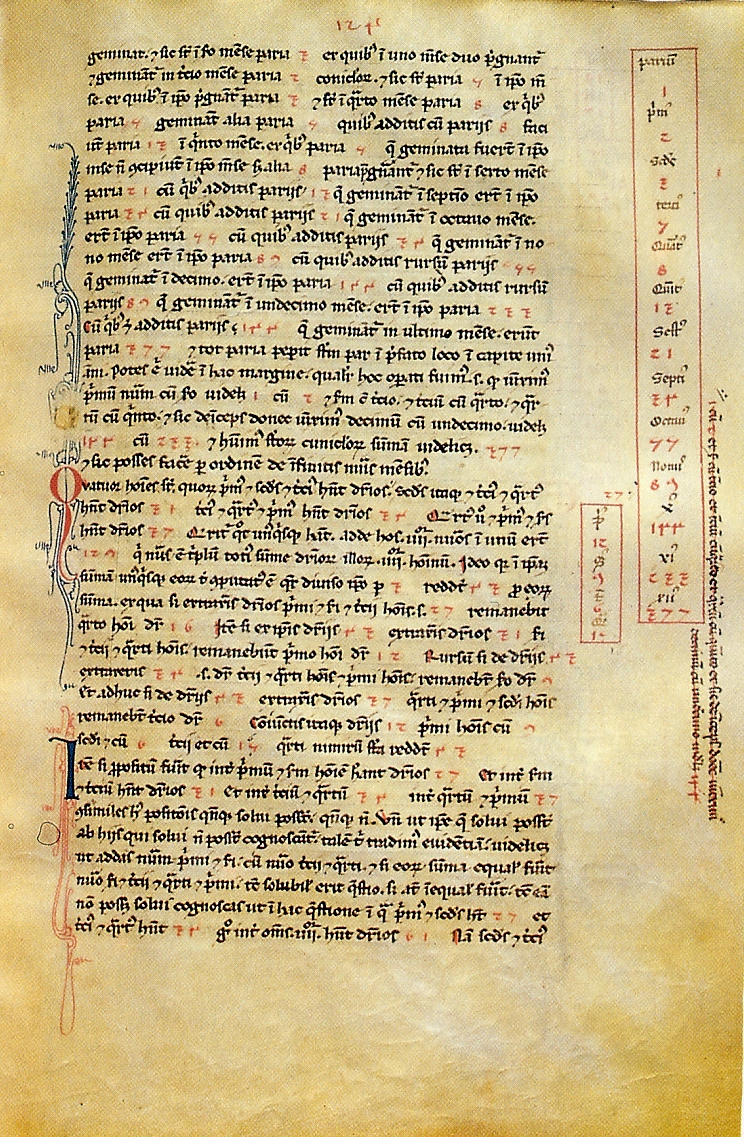
A page from Fibonacci's Liber Abaci (1202)

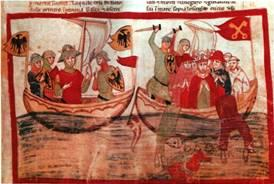
Battle of Giglio (1241)

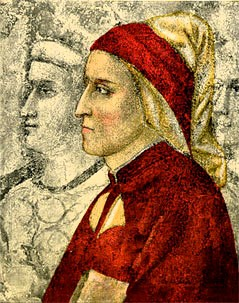
Dante Alighieri, author of the Divine Comedy

=== Renaissance ===
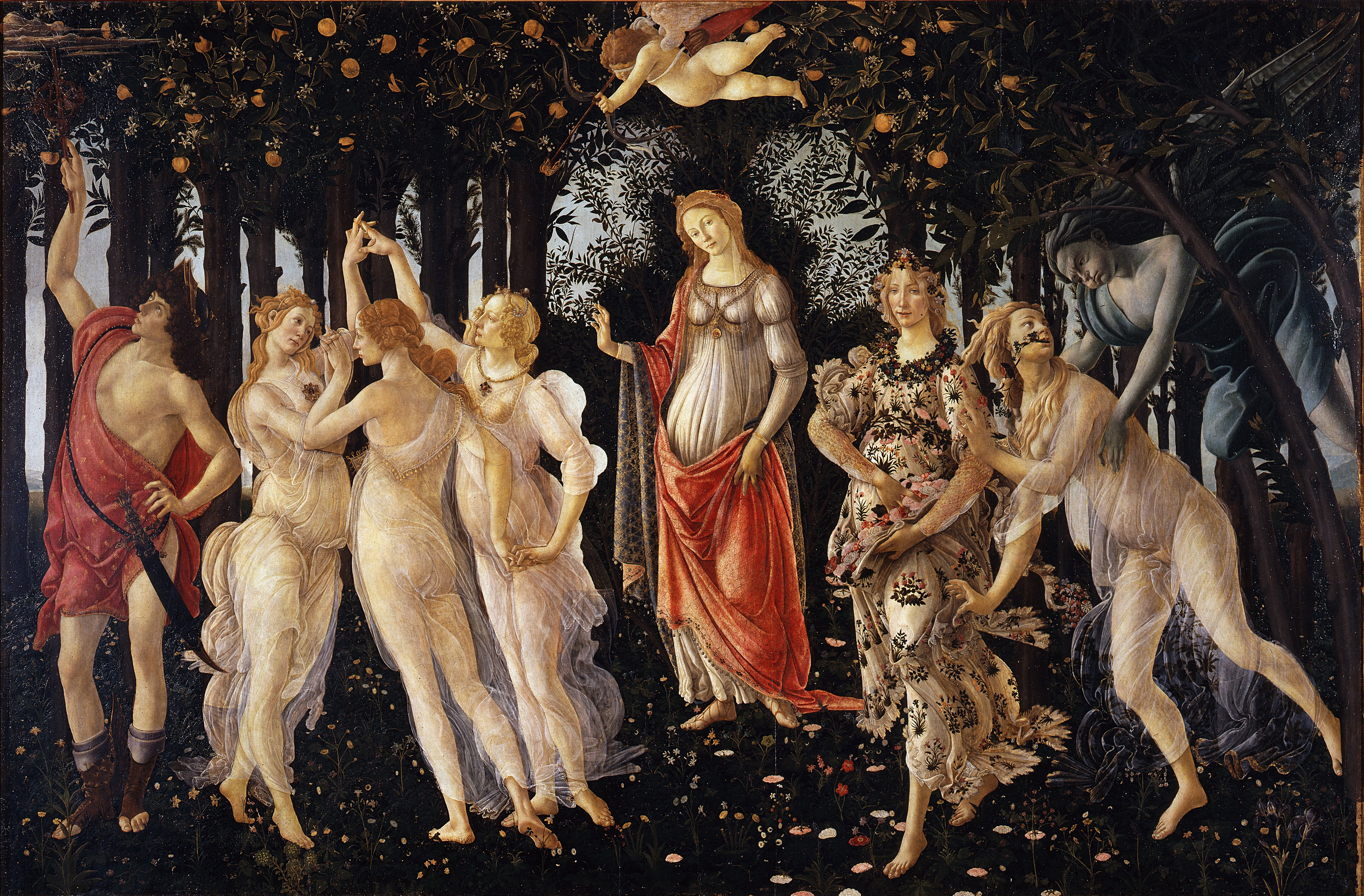
Primavera (1482) by Botticelli

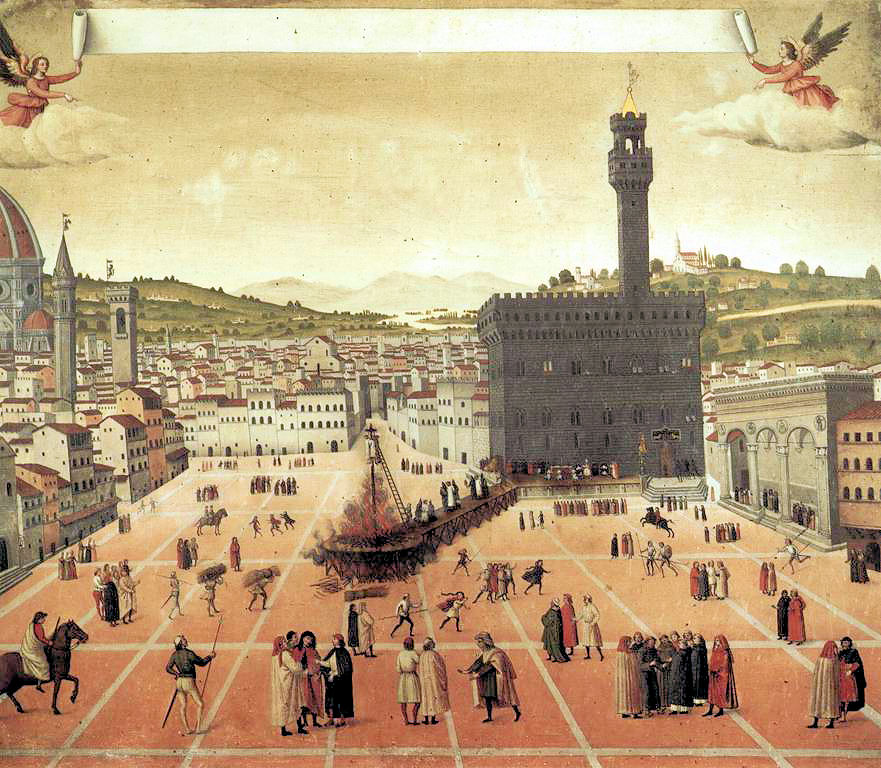
Hanging and burning of Girolamo Savonarola in Piazza della Signoria in Florence 1498 — painting depicting Renaissance Florence

Tuscany, especially Florence, is regarded as the birthplace of the Renaissance. Though "Tuscany" remained a linguistic, cultural, and geographic conception rather than a political reality, in the 15th century, Florence extended its dominion in Tuscany through the annexation of Arezzo in 1384, the purchase of Pisa in 1405, and the suppression of a local resistance there (1406). Livorno was bought in 1421 and became the harbour of Florence.

From the leading city of Florence, the republic was from 1434 onward dominated by the increasingly monarchical Medici family. Initially, under Cosimo, Piero the Gouty, Lorenzo and Piero the Unfortunate, the forms of the republic were retained and the Medici ruled without a title, usually without even a formal office. These rulers presided over the Florentine Renaissance. There was a return to the republic from 1494 to 1512, when first Girolamo Savonarola then Piero Soderini oversaw the state. Cardinal Giovanni di Lorenzo de' Medici retook the city with Spanish forces in 1512, before going to Rome to become Pope Leo X. Florence was dominated by a series of papal proxies until 1527 when the citizens declared the republic again, only to have it taken from them again in 1530 after a siege by an Imperial and Spanish army. At this point Pope Clement VII and Charles V appointed Alessandro de' Medici as the first formal hereditary ruler.

The Sienese commune was not incorporated into Tuscany until 1555, and during the 15th century, Siena enjoyed a cultural 'Sienese Renaissance' with its own more conservative character. Lucca remained an independent republic until 1847 when it became part of Grand Duchy of Tuscany by the will of its people. Piombino and other strategic towns constituted the tiny State of the Presidi under Spanish control.

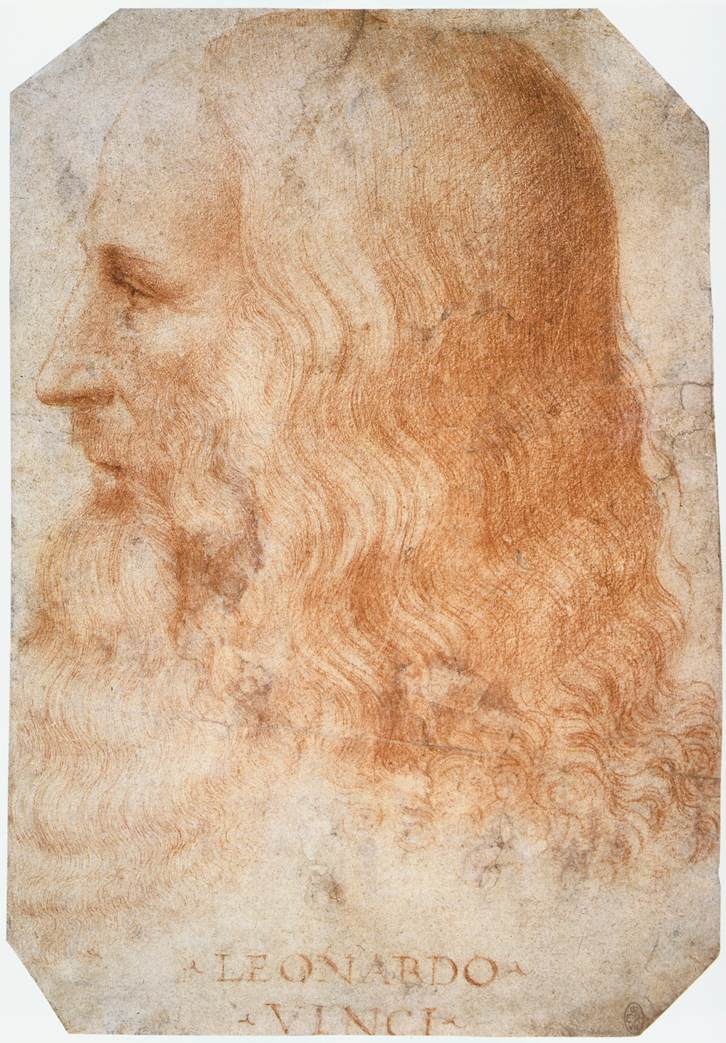
Leonardo da Vinci

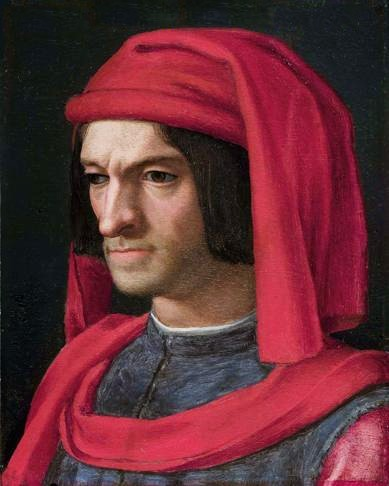
Lorenzo de' Medici

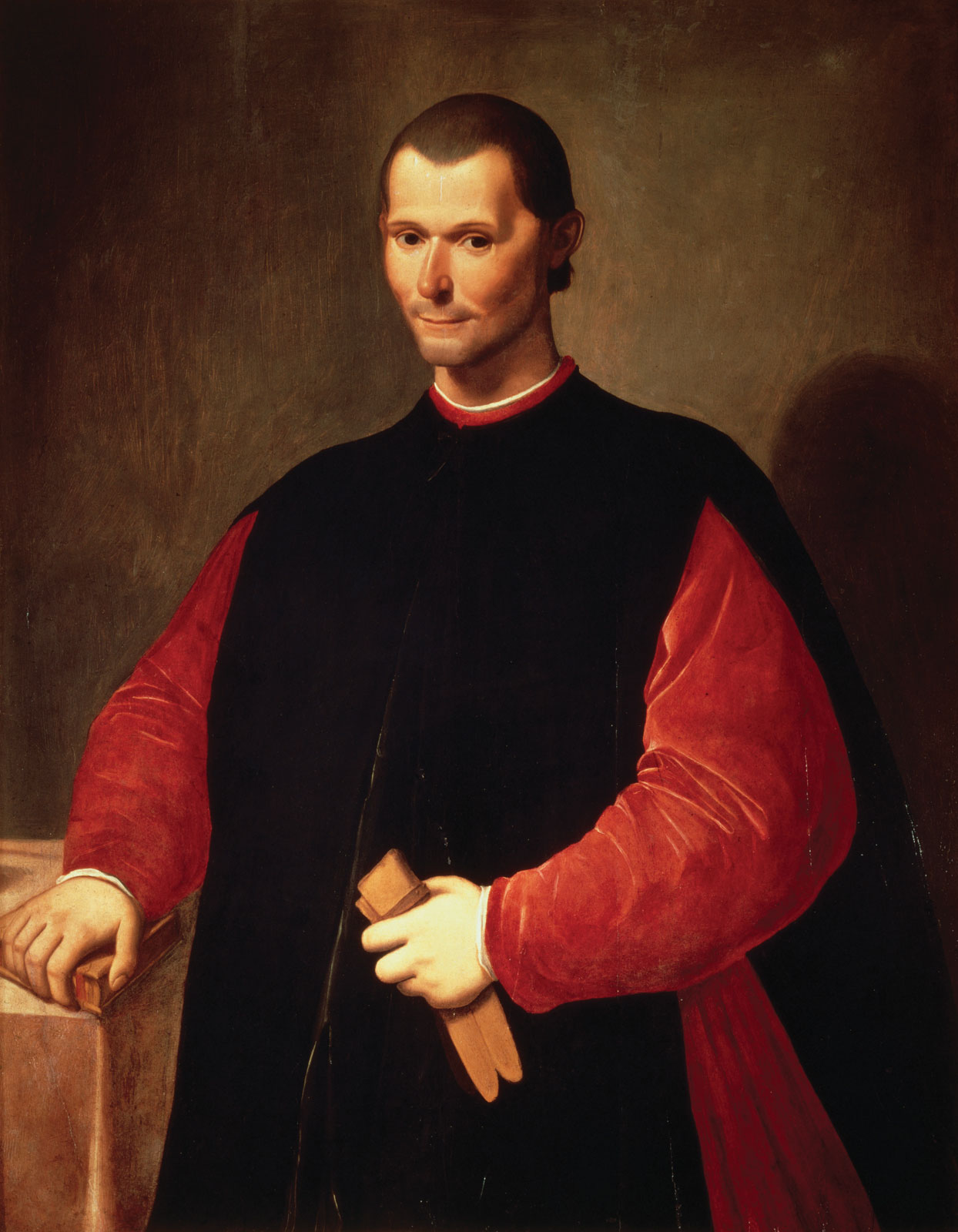
Niccolò Machiavelli, author of The Prince

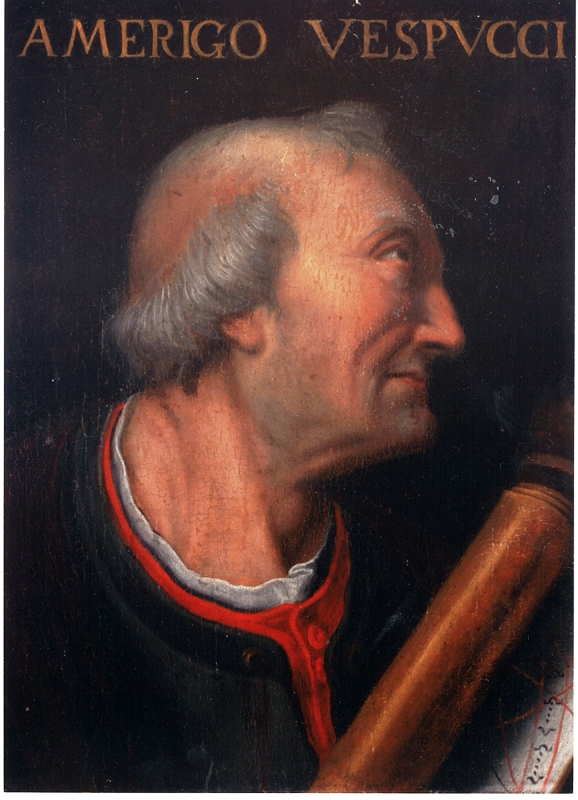
Amerigo Vespucci

=== Modern era ===
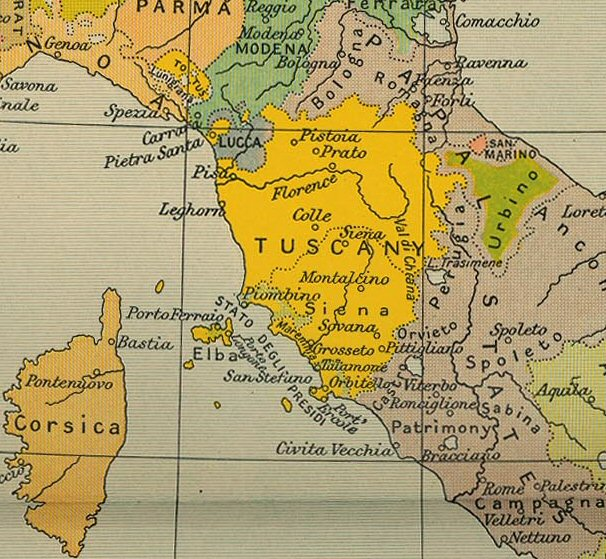
Map of the Grand Duchy of Tuscany

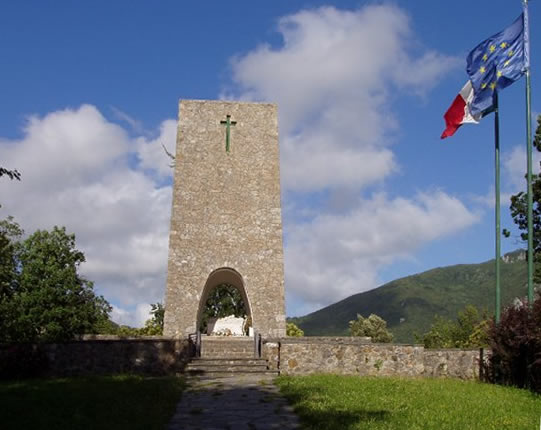
Memorial to the victims of the Sant'Anna di Stazzema massacre, in which 560 locals were murdered by Nazi Germans and Italian Fascists in 1944

In the 16th century, the Medicis, rulers of Florence, annexed the Republic of Siena, creating the Grand Duchy of Tuscany. The Medici family became extinct in 1737 with the death of Gian Gastone, and Tuscany was transferred to Francis, Duke of Lorraine and husband of Austrian Empress Maria Theresa, who let the country be ruled by his son. The dynasty of the Lorena ruled Tuscany until 1860, except during the Napoleonic period, when most of the country was annexed to the French Empire. After the Second Italian War of Independence, a revolution evicted the last Grand Duke, and after a plebiscite, Tuscany became part of the new Kingdom of Italy. From 1864 to 1870 Florence became the second capital of the kingdom.

Under Benito Mussolini, the area came under the dominance of local Fascist leaders such as Dino Perrone Compagni (from Florence), and Costanzo and Galeazzo Ciano (from Livorno). Following the fall of Mussolini and the armistice of 8 September 1943, Tuscany became part of the Nazi-controlled Italian Social Republic and was conquered almost totally by the Anglo-American forces during the summer of 1944.

Following the end of the Social Republic and the transition from the Kingdom to the modern Italian Republic, Tuscany once more flourished as a cultural centre of Italy. Since the establishment of the regional government in 1970, Tuscany has always been ruled by centre-left governments.

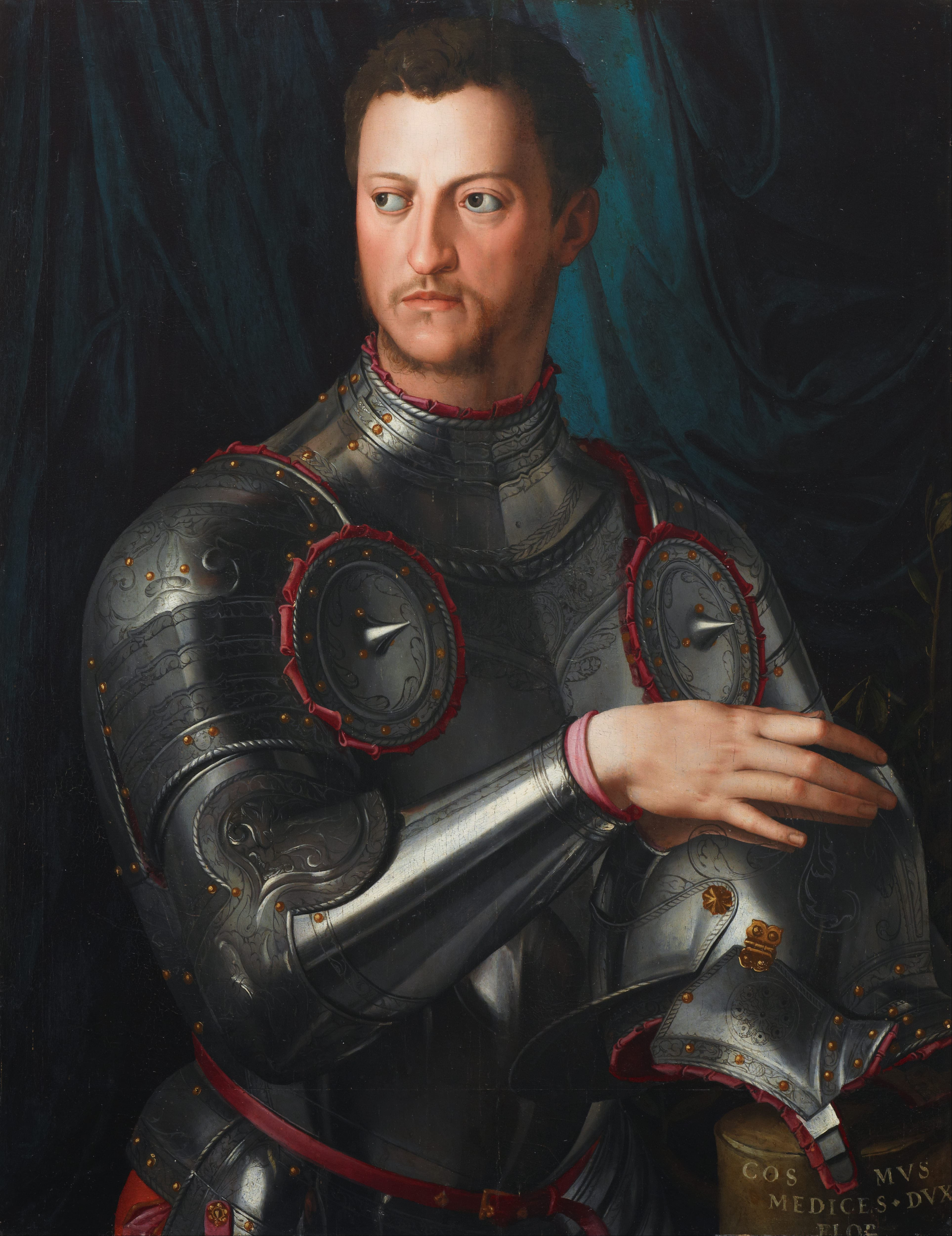
Cosimo I de' Medici, first Grand Duke of Tuscany

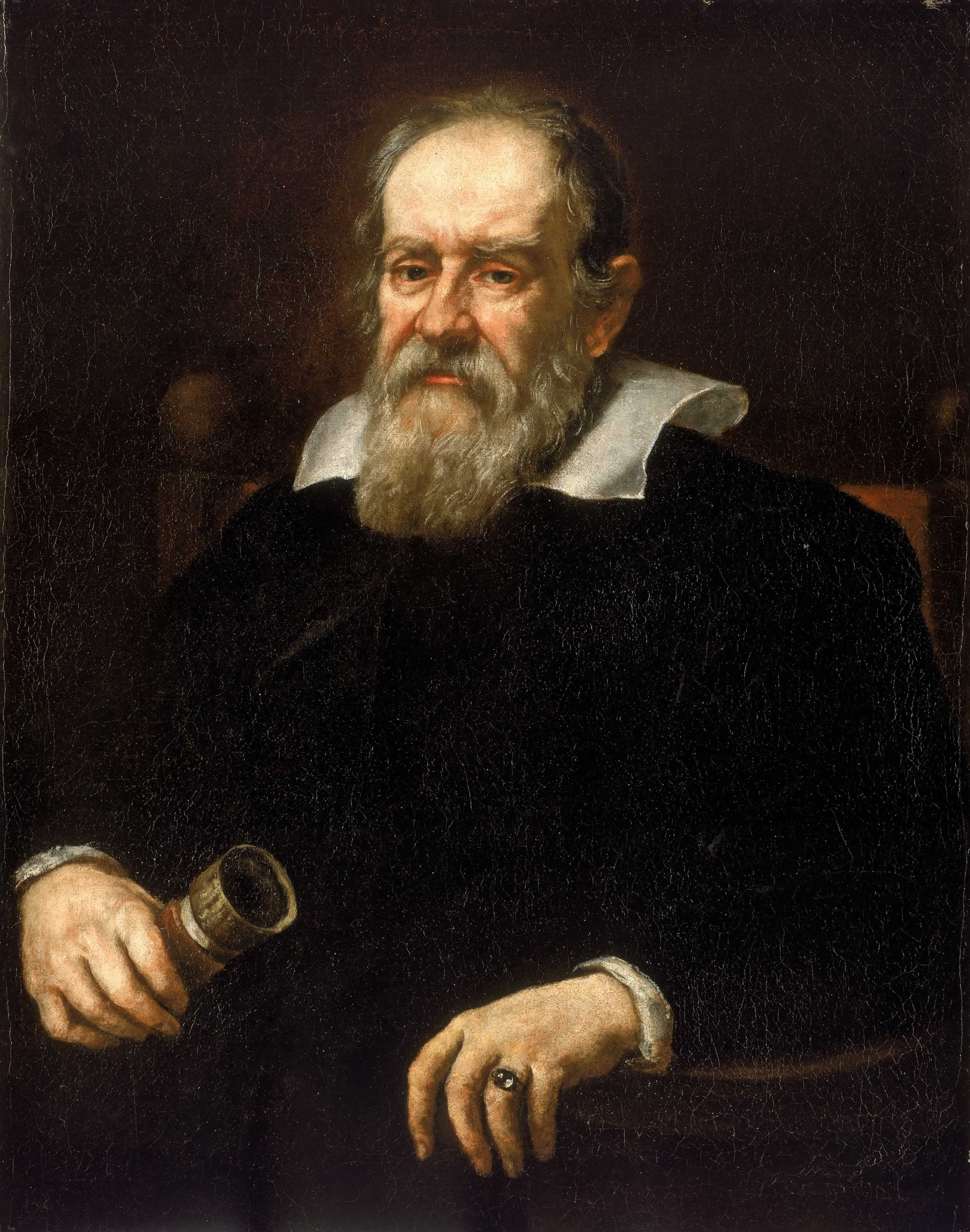
Galileo Galilei

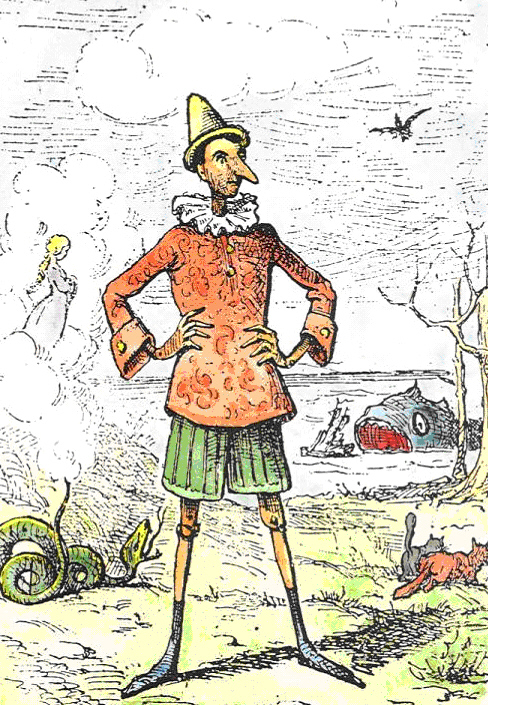
Pinocchio, created by Carlo Collodi (1883)

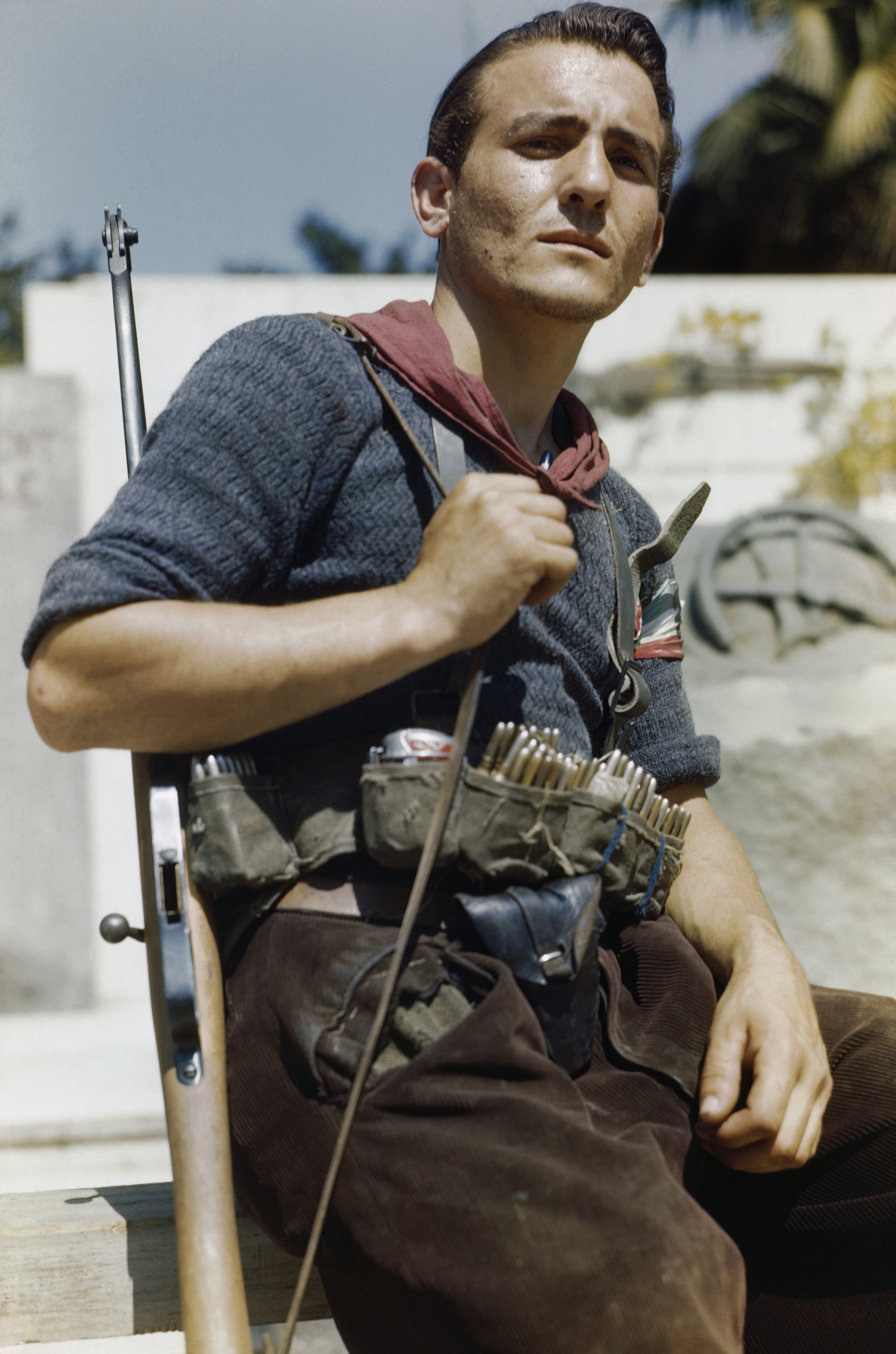
An Italian partisan in Florence (1944)

== Geography ==
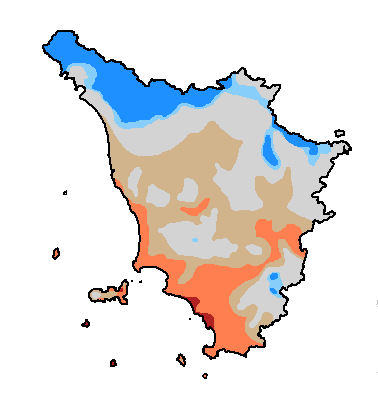
Thornthwaite climate classification of Tuscany: A: Im > 200; B: 80 < Im < 100; B_{1}-B_{2}: 20 < Im < 80; C_{2}: 0 < Im < 20; C_{1}: −33,3 < Im < 0; D: Im < −33,3

Roughly triangular in shape, Tuscany borders the regions of Liguria to the northwest, Emilia-Romagna to the north, Marche and Umbria to the east, and Lazio to the south and southeast. The comune (municipality) of Badia Tedalda, in the Tuscan Province of Arezzo, has an exclave named Ca' Raffaello within Emilia-Romagna.

Tuscany has a western coastline on the Ligurian Sea and the Tyrrhenian Sea, among which is the Tuscan Archipelago, of which the most significant island is Elba. Tuscany has an area of approximately 23,000 square kilometres (8,900 sq mi). Surrounded and crossed by major mountain chains and with few (but fertile) plains, the region has a relief dominated by hilly country used for agriculture. Hills make up nearly two-thirds (66.5%) of the region's total area, covering 15,292 square kilometres (5,904 sq mi), and mountains (of which the highest are the Apennines), a further 25%, or 5,770 square kilometres (2,230 sq mi). Plains occupy 8.4% of the total area—1,930 square kilometres (750 sq mi)—mainly around the valley of the Arno. Many of Tuscany's most significant cities lie on the banks of the Arno, including the capital, Florence, Empoli, and Pisa. To the north of Florence lies the Mugello valley, a green and fertile area surrounded by the Apennine mountains, known for its rolling hills, medieval villages, and the Mugello Circuit, one of Italy’s most famous racing tracks.

The climate is fairly mild in the coastal areas, and harsher and rainy in the interior, with considerable fluctuations in temperature between winter and summer, giving the region a soil-building active freeze-thaw cycle, in part accounting for the region once having served as a key breadbasket of ancient Rome.

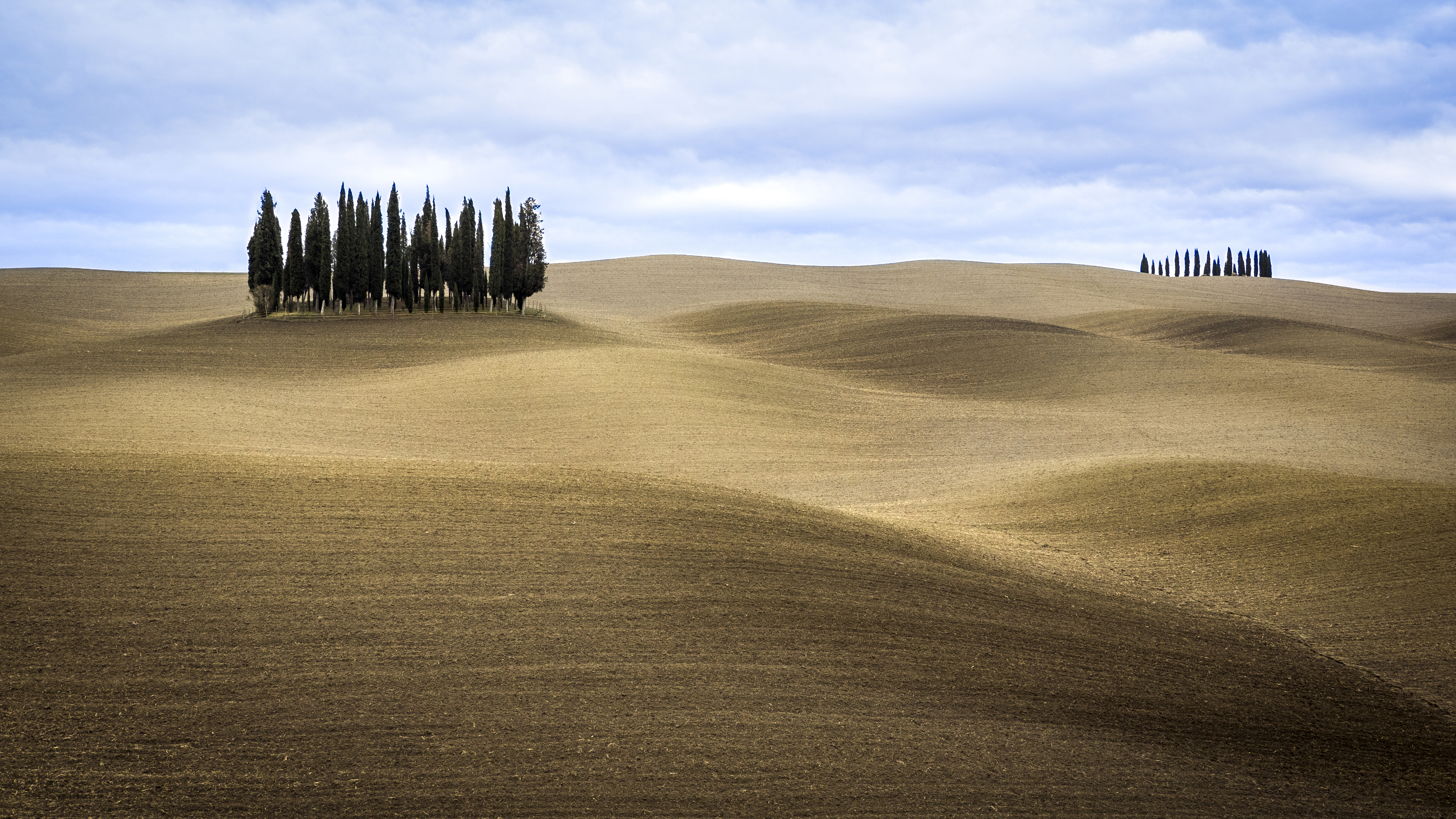
Typical landscape of the Val d'Orcia

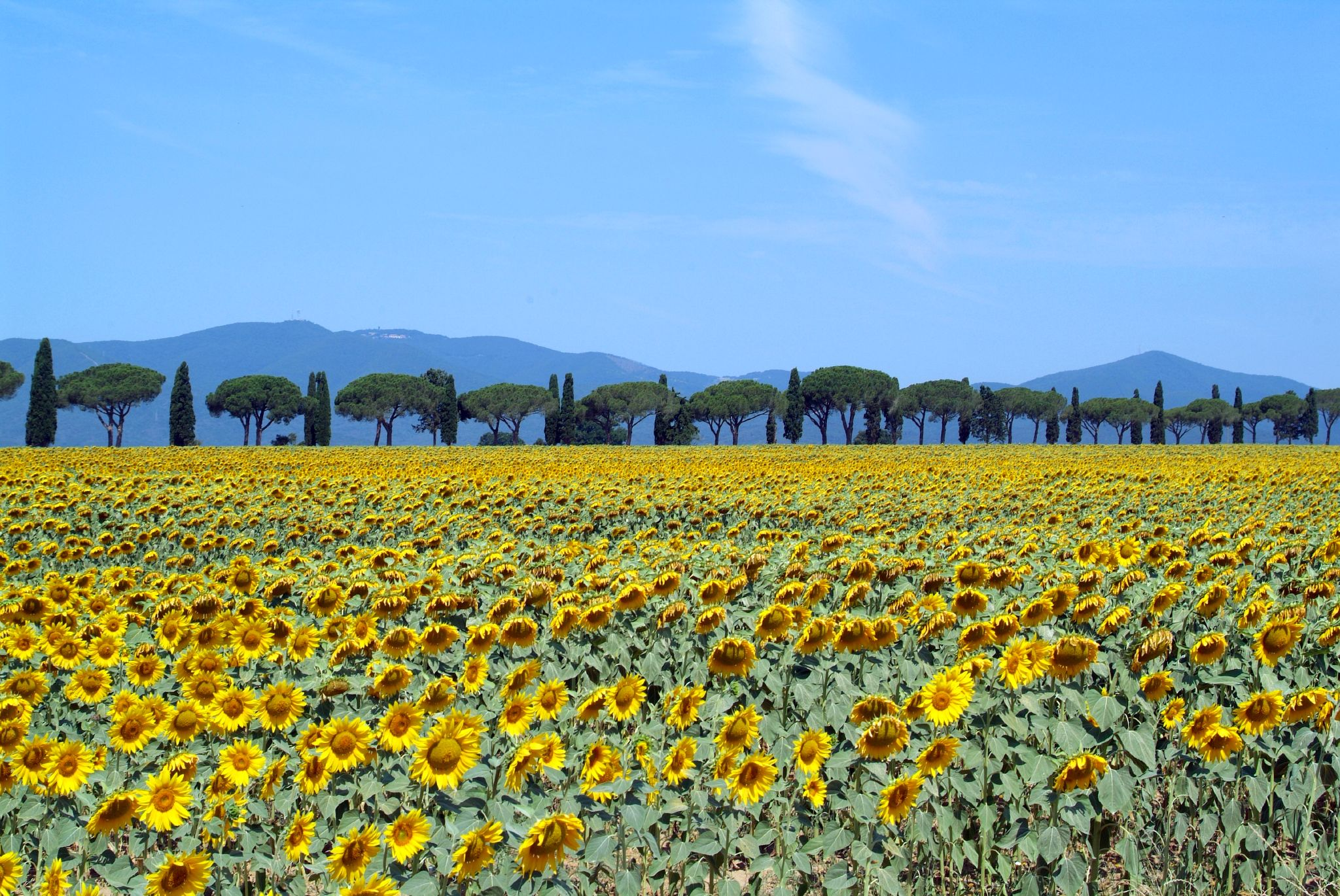
Sunflower field near Castiglione della Pescaia, Maremma

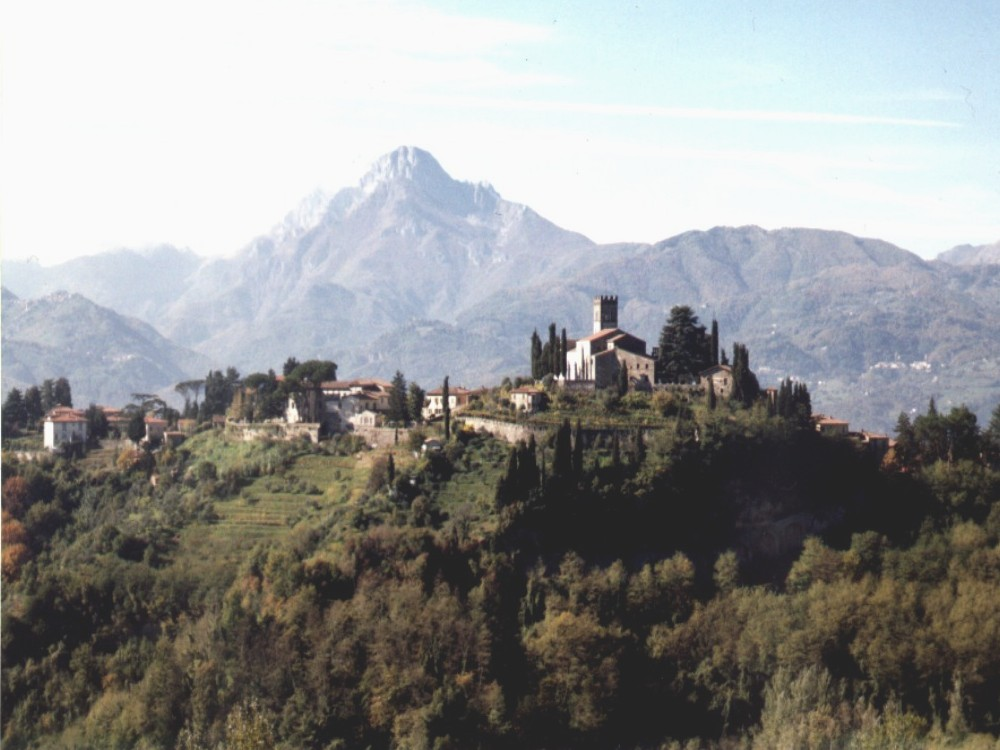
Tuscan landscape near Barga between the Apuan Alps and the Apennine Mountains

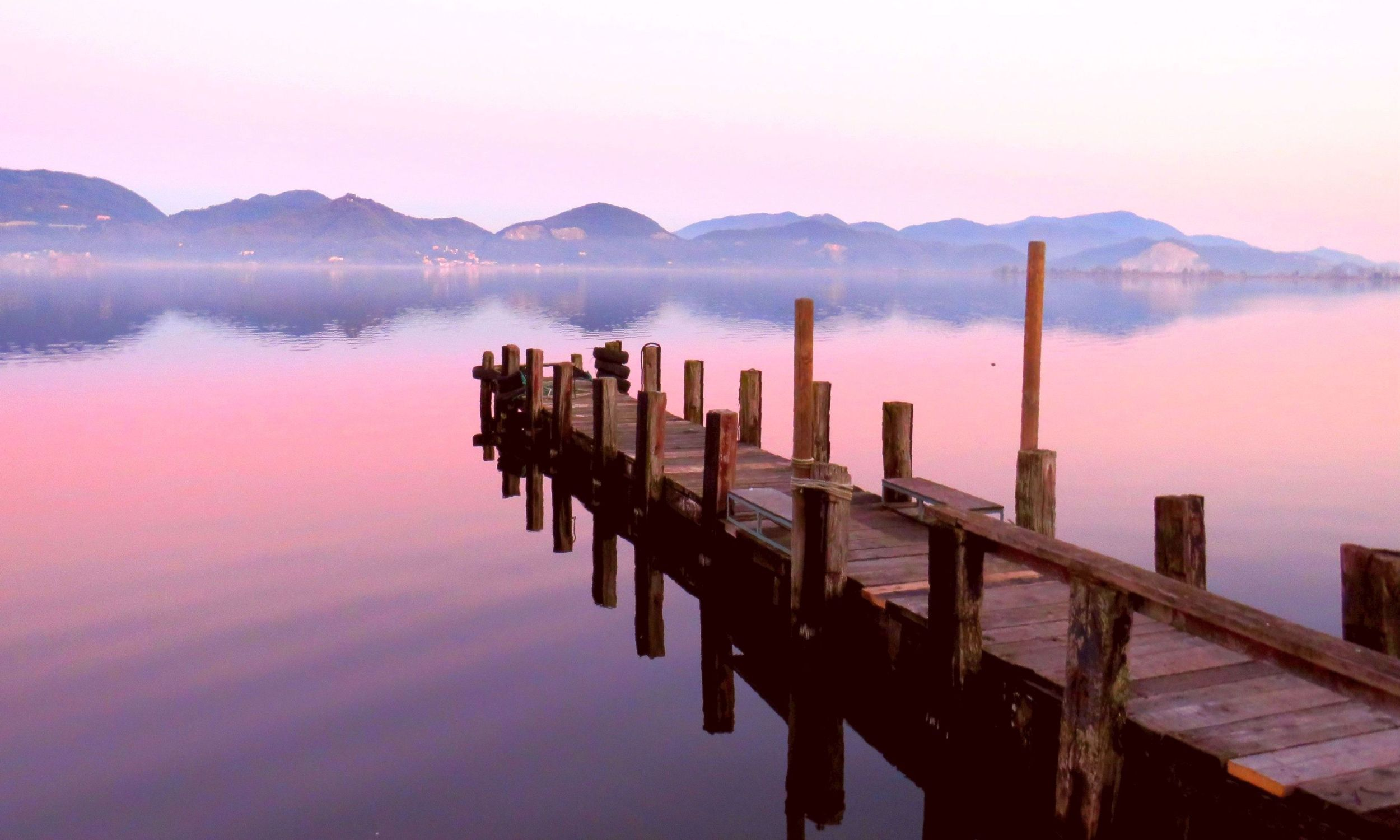
Lake Massaciuccoli

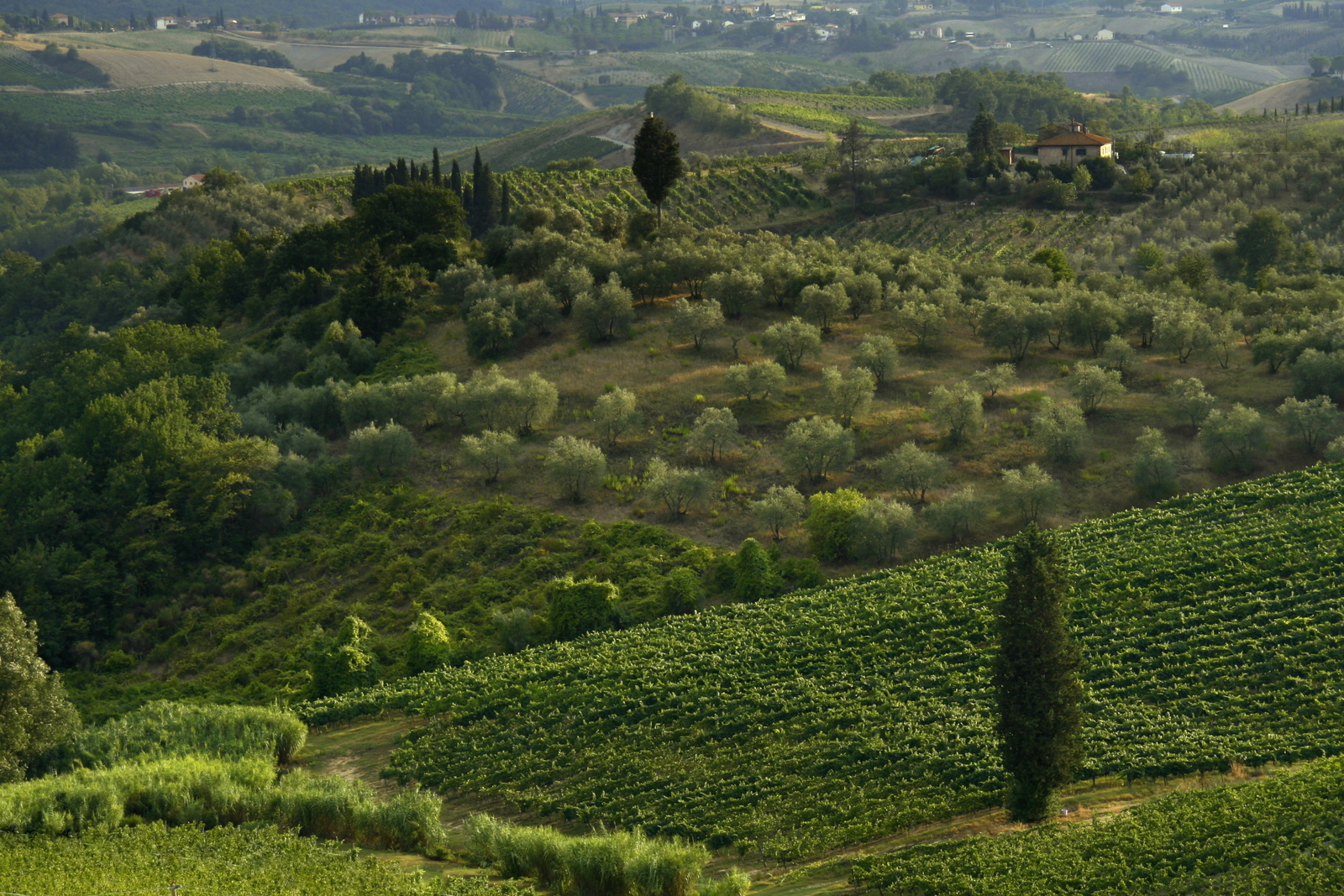
A view of the Chianti countryside

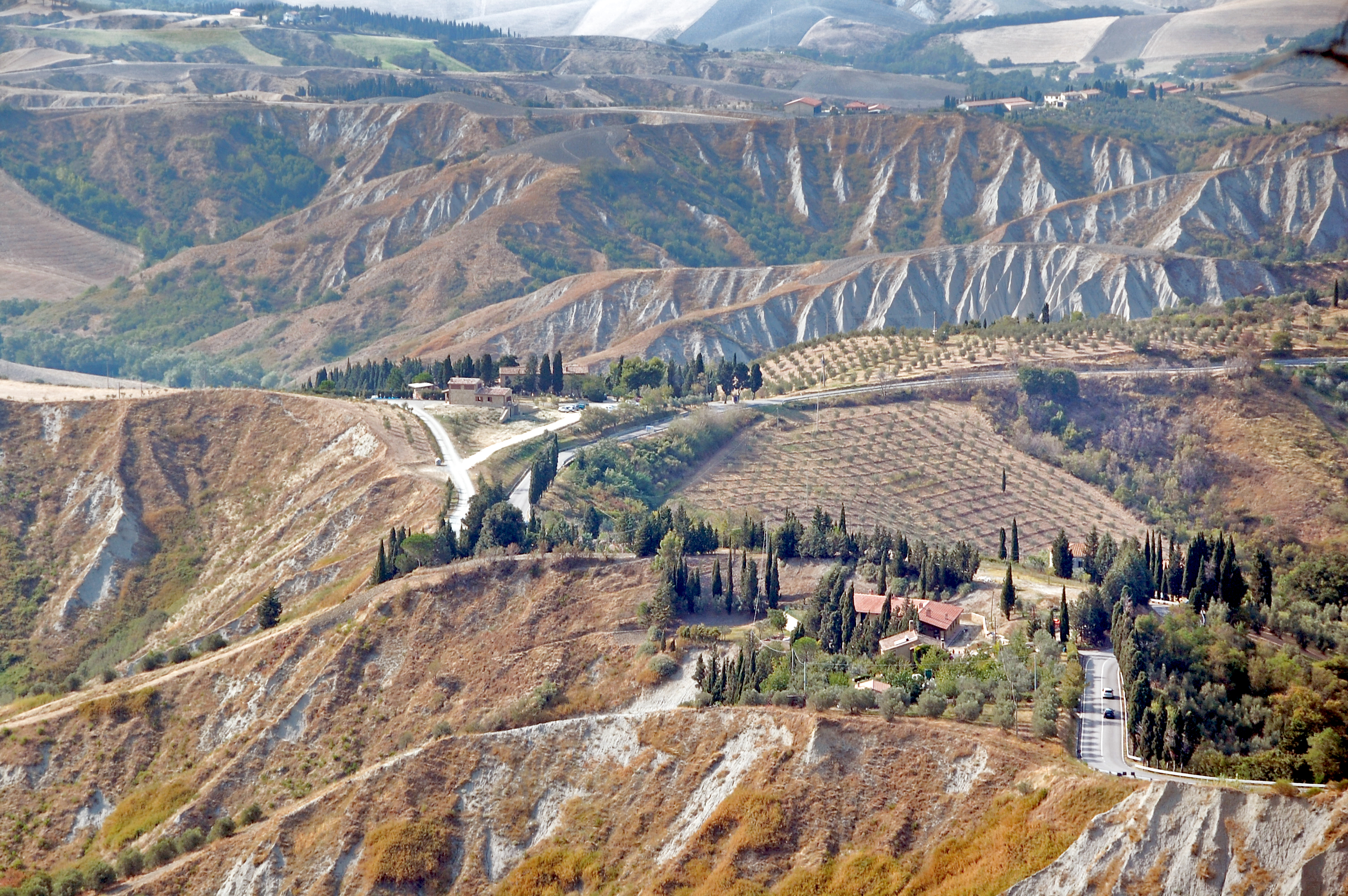
Balze di Volterra

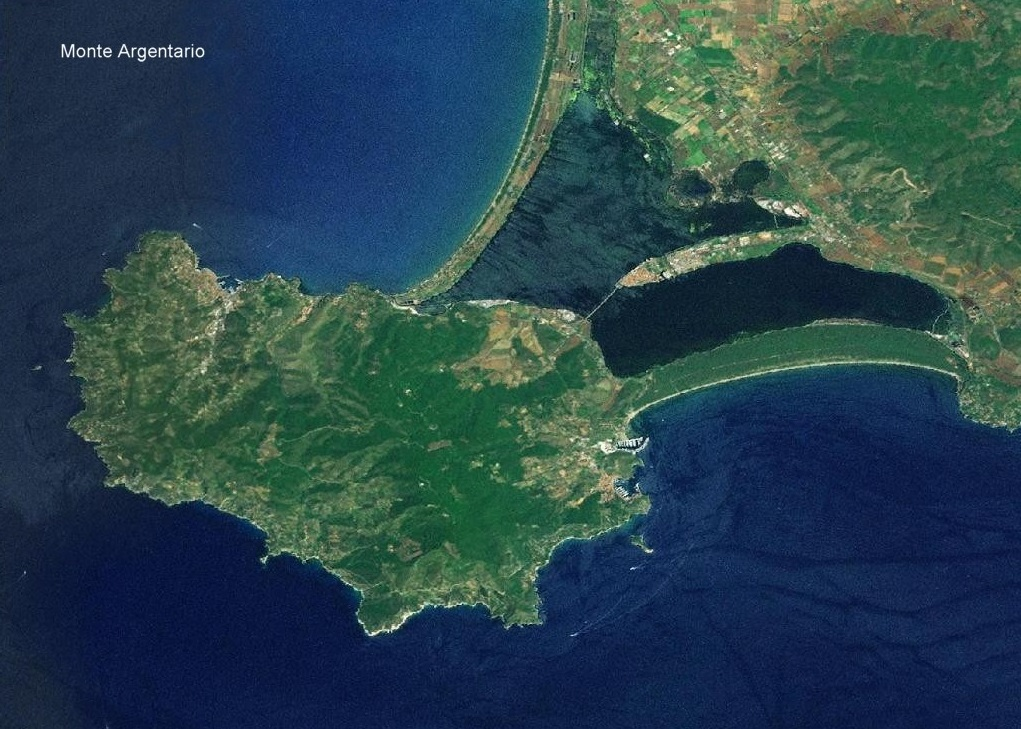
Monte Argentario

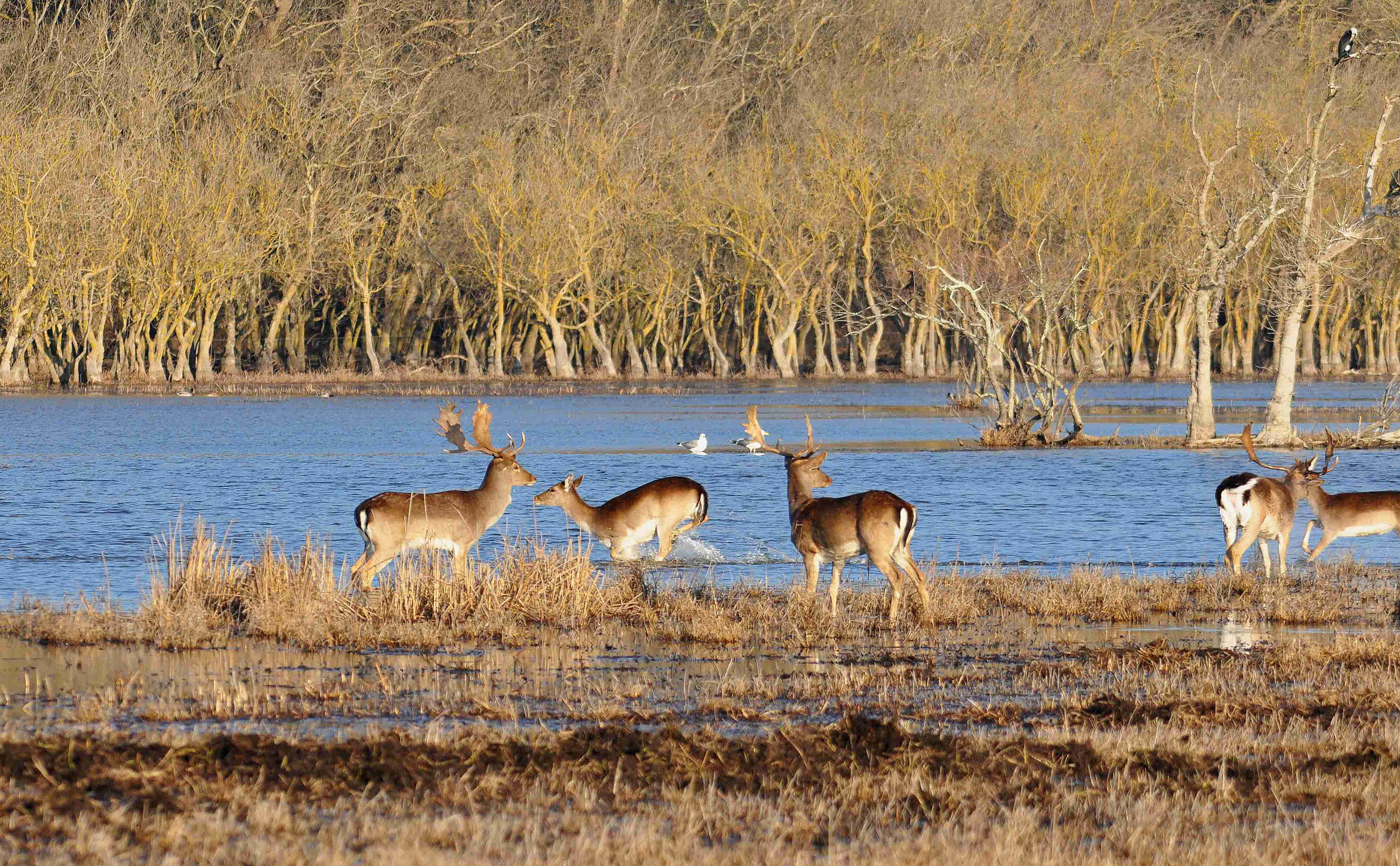
Fallow deer in the Padule di Bolgheri

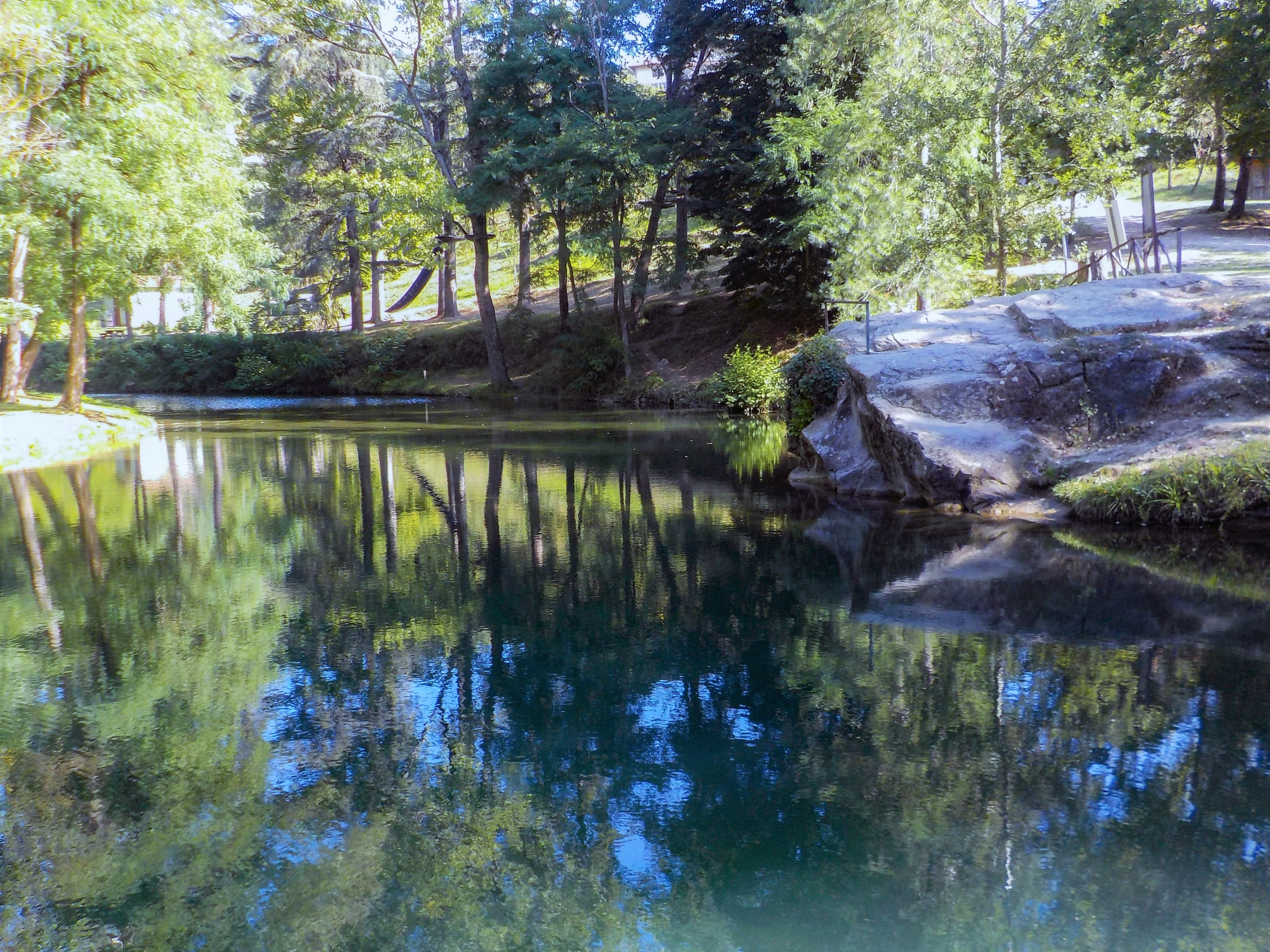
Arno river in Casentino

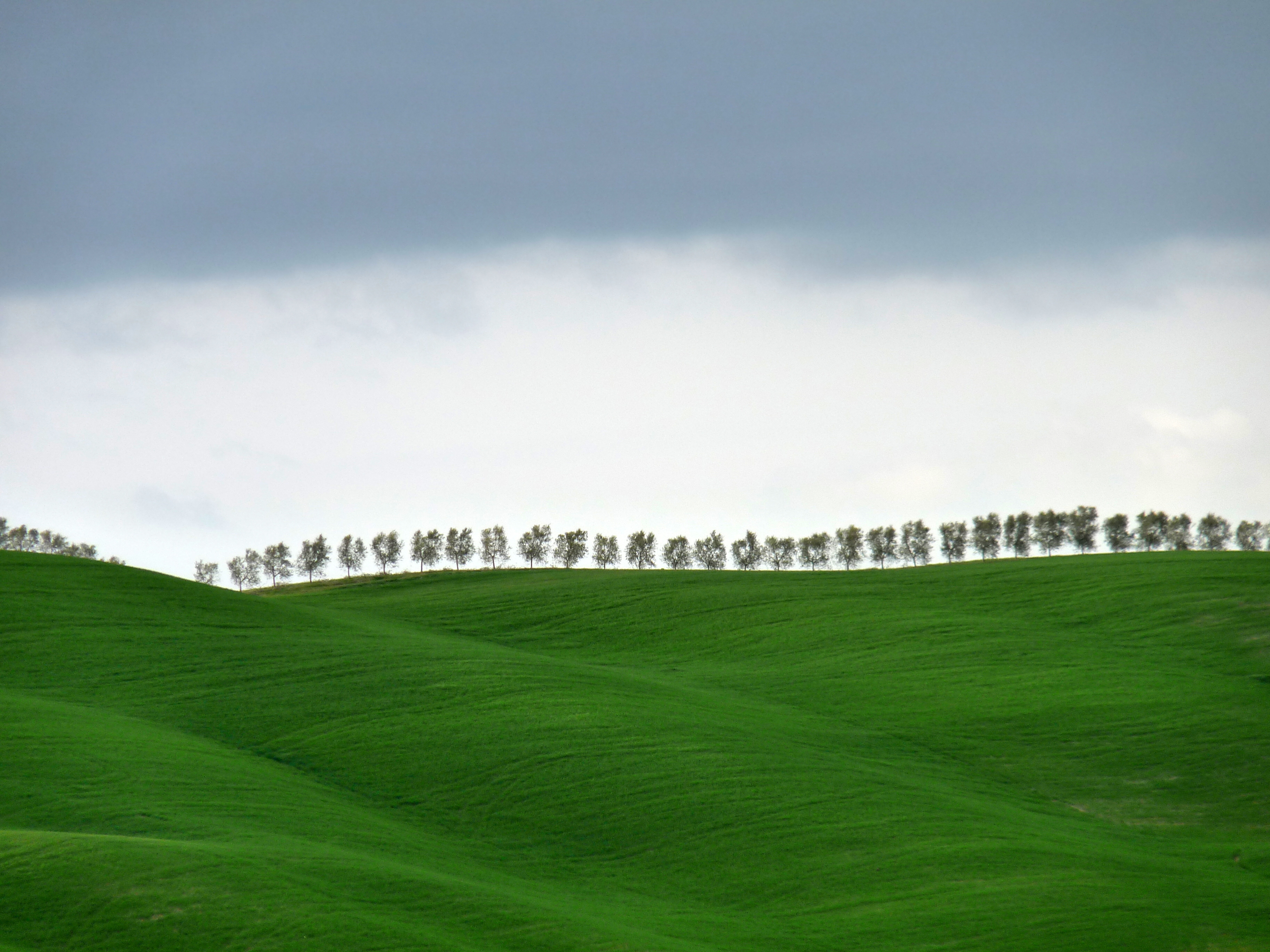
Hilly landscape in Val d'Orcia

== Demographics ==
Historical population
Year	Pop.	±%
1861	1,920,397	—
1871	2,123,553	+10.6%
1881	2,187,272	+3.0%
1901	2,503,223	+14.4%
1911	2,669,637	+6.6%
1921	2,809,584	+5.2%
1931	2,913,935	+3.7%
1936	2,978,013	+2.2%
1951	3,158,811	+6.1%
1961	3,286,160	+4.0%
1971	3,473,097	+5.7%
1981	3,581,051	+3.1%
1991	3,529,946	−1.4%
2001	3,497,806	−0.9%
2011	3,672,202	+5.0%
2021	3,663,191	−0.2%
Source: ISTAT

As of 2026, the population is 3,659,222, of which 48.8% are male, and 51.2% are female. Minors make up 13.6% of the population, and seniors make up 27.1%.

The population density of Tuscany, with 159.2 inhabitants per square kilometre (412/sq mi), is below the national average (195.1/km^{2} or 505/sq mi). This is due to the low population density of the provinces of Arezzo, Siena, and especially Grosseto (47.7/km^{2} or 124/sq mi). The highest density is found in the province of Prato (714.1/km^{2} or 1,850/sq mi), followed by the provinces of Pistoia, Livorno, Florence and Lucca, peaking in the cities of Florence (more than 3,535/km^{2} or 9,160/sq mi), Livorno, Prato, Viareggio, Forte dei Marmi and Montecatini Terme (all with a population density of more than 1,000/km^{2} or 2,600/sq mi). The territorial distribution of the population is closely linked to the socio-cultural and, more recently, economic and industrial development of Tuscany.

Accordingly, the least densely populated areas are those where the main activity is agriculture, unlike the others where, despite the presence of several large industrial complexes, the main activities are connected with tourism and associated services, alongside many small firms in the leather, glass, paper and clothing sectors.

=== Immigration ===
As of 2025, immigrants make up 14.5% of the total population. The 5 largest foreign countries of birth are Albania, Romania, China, Morocco, and Ukraine.

Foreign population by country of birth (2025)
Country of birth	Population
Albania	78,656
Romania	66,023
China	51,551
Morocco	33,451
Ukraine	16,483
Peru	15,525
Senegal	15,512
Pakistan	14,192
Bangladesh	13,037
Philippines	11,730
Germany	10,842
Brazil	10,133
India	8,281
Poland	8,136
Switzerland	7,995

== Government and politics ==
The President of Tuscany is the head of government. Legislative power is vested in the Regional Council of Tuscany, while executive power is exercised by the Regional Government led by the President, who is directly elected by the people. The current Statute, which regulates the functioning of the regional institutions, has been in force since 2005.

Tuscany is a stronghold of the centre-left Democratic Party (PD), forming with Emilia-Romagna, Umbria and Marche the so-called Italian political "Red Quadrilateral". Since 1970, Tuscany has been continuously governed by left-wing governments.

=== Administrative divisions ===
Tuscany is divided into nine provinces and one Metropolitan City:

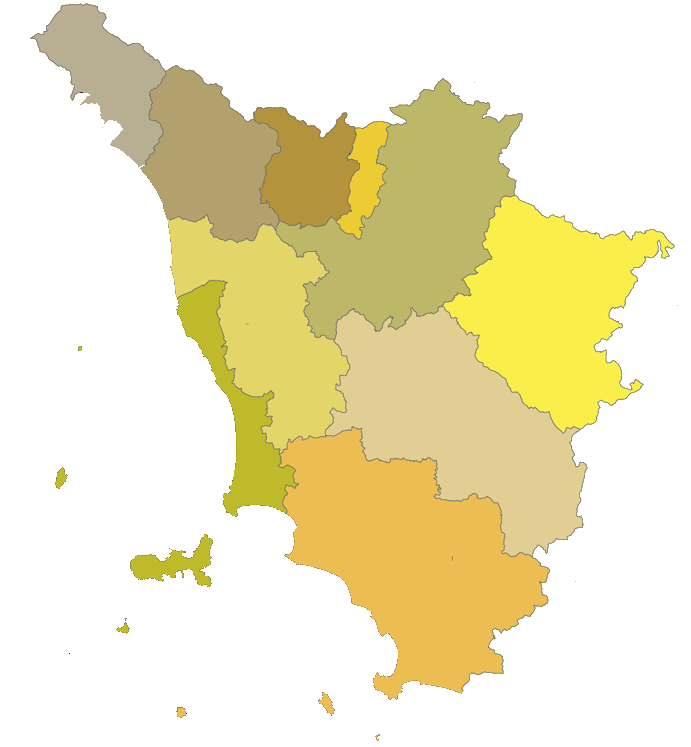

Province	Population (2026)	Area (km^{2})	Density (inh./km^{2})	Municipalities
Province of Arezzo	333,269	3,233.08	103.1	36
Metropolitan City of Florence	988,494	3,513.69	281.3	41
Province of Grosseto	214,863	4,503.12	47.7	28
Province of Livorno	324,893	1,213.71	267.7	19
Province of Lucca	379,957	1,773.22	214.3	33
Province of Massa and Carrara	186,637	1,154.68	161.6	17
Province of Pisa	419,588	2,444.72	171.6	37
Province of Pistoia	290,867	964.12	301.7	20
Province of Prato	261,152	365.72	714.1	7
Province of Siena	259,502	3,820.98	67.9	35

== Culture ==
Tuscany has an immense cultural and artistic heritage, expressed in the region's churches, palaces, art galleries, museums, villages, and piazzas. Many of these artifacts are found in the main cities, such as Florence and Siena, but also in smaller villages scattered around the region, such as San Gimignano.

=== Art ===
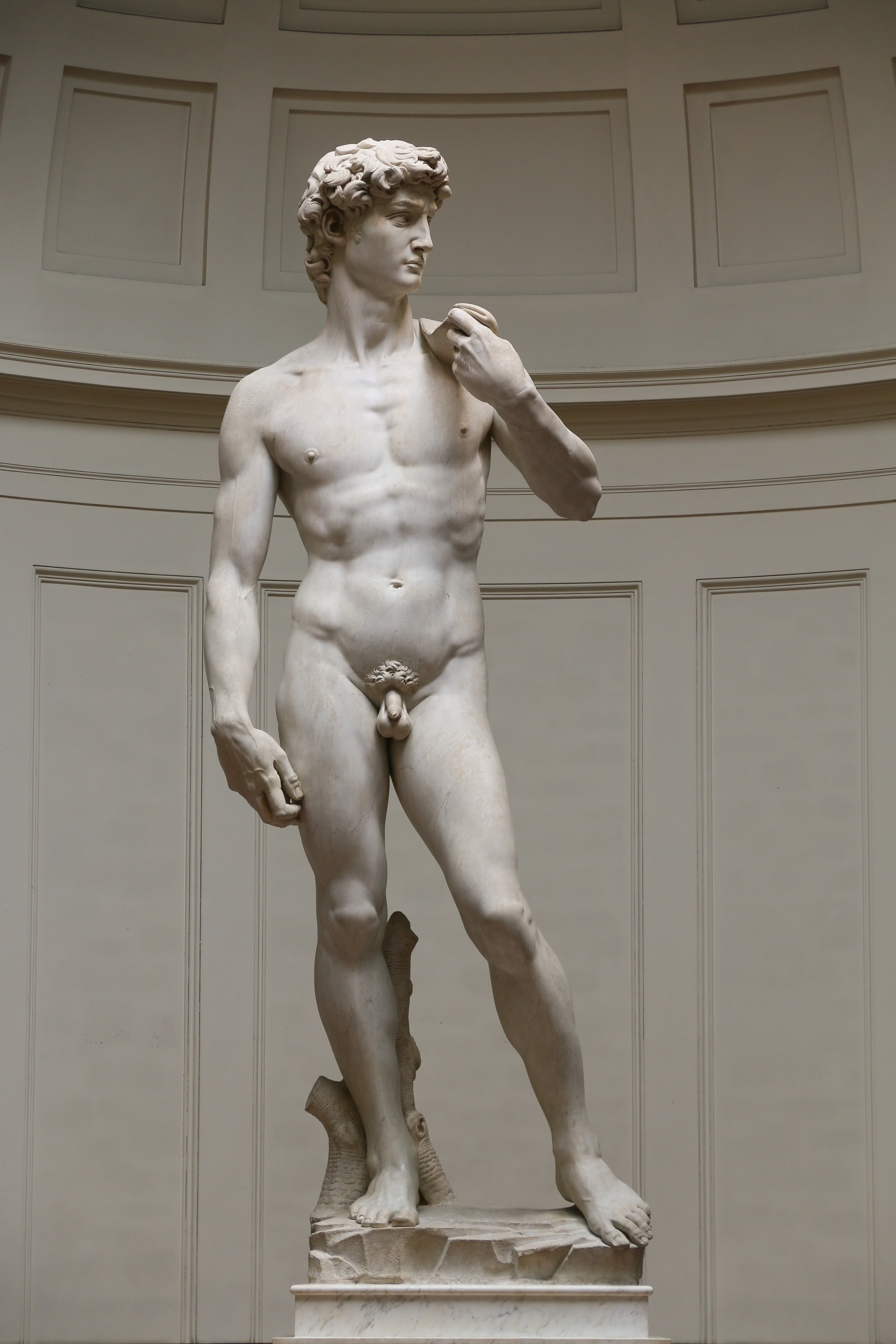
Michelangelo's David

Tuscany has a unique artistic legacy, and Florence is one of the world's most important water-colour centres, even so that it is often nicknamed the "art palace of Italy" (the region is also believed to have the largest concentration of Renaissance art and architecture in the world). Painters such as Cimabue and Giotto, the fathers of Italian painting, lived in Florence and Tuscany, as well as Arnolfo and Andrea Pisano, renewers of architecture and sculpture; Brunelleschi, Donatello and Masaccio, forefathers of the Renaissance; Ghiberti and the Della Robbias, Filippo Lippi and Angelico; Botticelli, Paolo Uccello, and the universal genius of Leonardo da Vinci and Michelangelo.

The region contains numerous museums and art galleries, many housing some of the world's most precious works of art. Such museums include the Uffizi, which keeps Botticelli's The Birth of Venus, the Palazzo Pitti, and the Bargello, to name a few. Most of the frescos, sculptures, and paintings in Tuscany are held in the region's abundant churches and cathedrals, such as Florence Cathedral, Siena Cathedral, Pisa Cathedral and the Collegiata di San Gimignano.

=== Art schools ===
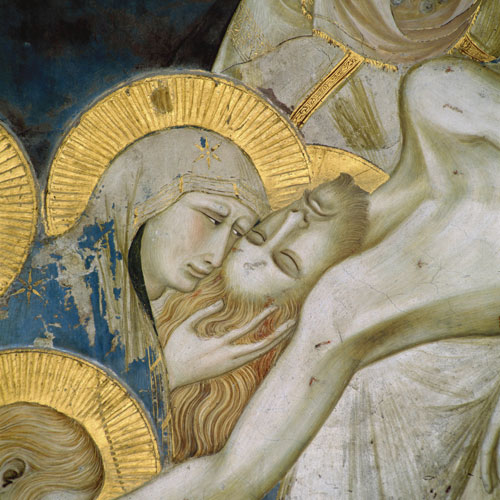
A painting from the Sienese School by Pietro Lorenzetti

In the medieval period and the Renaissance, four main Tuscan art schools competed against each other: the Florentine School, the Sienese School, the Pisan School, and the Lucchese School.

- The Florentine School refers to artists in, from, or influenced by the naturalistic style developed in the 14th century, largely through the efforts of Giotto di Bondone, and in the 15th century the leading school of the world. Some of the best known artists of the Florentine School are Brunelleschi, Donatello, Michelangelo, Fra Angelico, Botticelli, Lippi, Masolino, and Masaccio.
- The Sienese School of painting flourished in Siena between the 13th and 15th centuries and for a time rivaled Florence, though it was more conservative, being inclined towards the decorative beauty and elegant grace of late Gothic art. Its most important representatives include Duccio, whose work shows Byzantine influence; his pupil Simone Martini; Pietro and Ambrogio Lorenzetti; Domenico and Taddeo di Bartolo; and Sassetta and Matteo di Giovanni. Unlike the naturalistic Florentine art, there is a mystical streak in Sienese art, characterized by a common focus on miraculous events, distortions of time and place, and often dreamlike coloration, with less attention to proportions. In the 16th century, the Mannerists Beccafumi and Il Sodoma worked there. While Baldassare Peruzzi was born and trained in Siena, his major works and style reflect his long career in Rome. The economic and political decline of Siena by the 16th century, and its eventual subjugation by Florence, largely checked the development of Sienese painting, although it also meant that many Sienese works in churches and public buildings were not discarded or destroyed by new paintings or rebuilding. Siena remains a remarkably well-preserved Italian late-Medieval town.
- The Lucchese School, also known as the School of Lucca and as the Pisan-Lucchese School, was a school of painting and sculpture that flourished in the 11th and 12th centuries in the western and southern part of the region, with an important centre in Volterra. The art is mostly anonymous. Although not as elegant or delicate as the Florentine School, Lucchese works are remarkable for their monumentality.

==== Main artistic centres ====
In the province of Arezzo:

- Arezzo
- Castiglion Fiorentino
- Cortona
- Lucignano
- Poppi
- Sansepolcro

In the province of Florence:

- Florence
- Fiesole
- Certaldo

In the Province of Grosseto:

- Grosseto
- Massa Marittima
- Orbetello
- Pitigliano
- Roselle
- Sorano
- Sovana

In the province of Livorno:

- Campiglia Marittima
- Livorno
- Bibbona
- Bolgheri
- Piombino
- San Vincenzo
- Populonia
- Suvereto

In the province of Lucca:

- Barga
- Castelnuovo di Garfagnana
- Castiglione di Garfagnana
- Lucca
- Pietrasanta
- Villa Basilica

In the province of Massa and Carrara:

- Massa
- Carrara
- Pontremoli
- Fivizzano
- Fosdinovo

In the province of Pisa:

- Pisa
- San Miniato
- Volterra
- Vicopisano

In the province of Pistoia:

- Pescia
- Pistoia

In the province of Prato:

- Carmignano
- Poggio a Caiano
- Prato

In the province of Siena:

- Colle di Val d'Elsa
- Montalcino
- Montepulciano
- Monteriggioni
- Pienza
- San Gimignano
- Siena
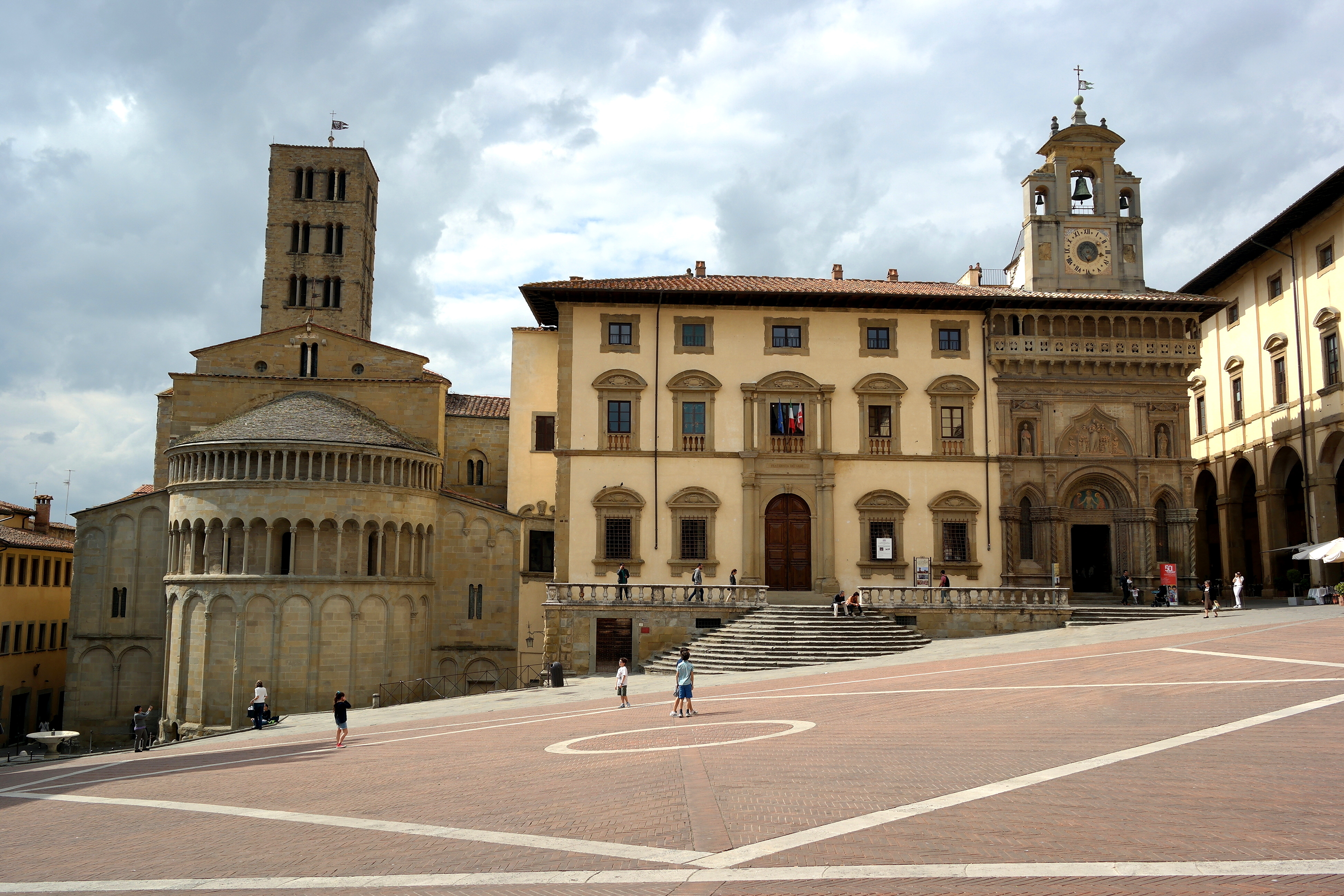
Arezzo

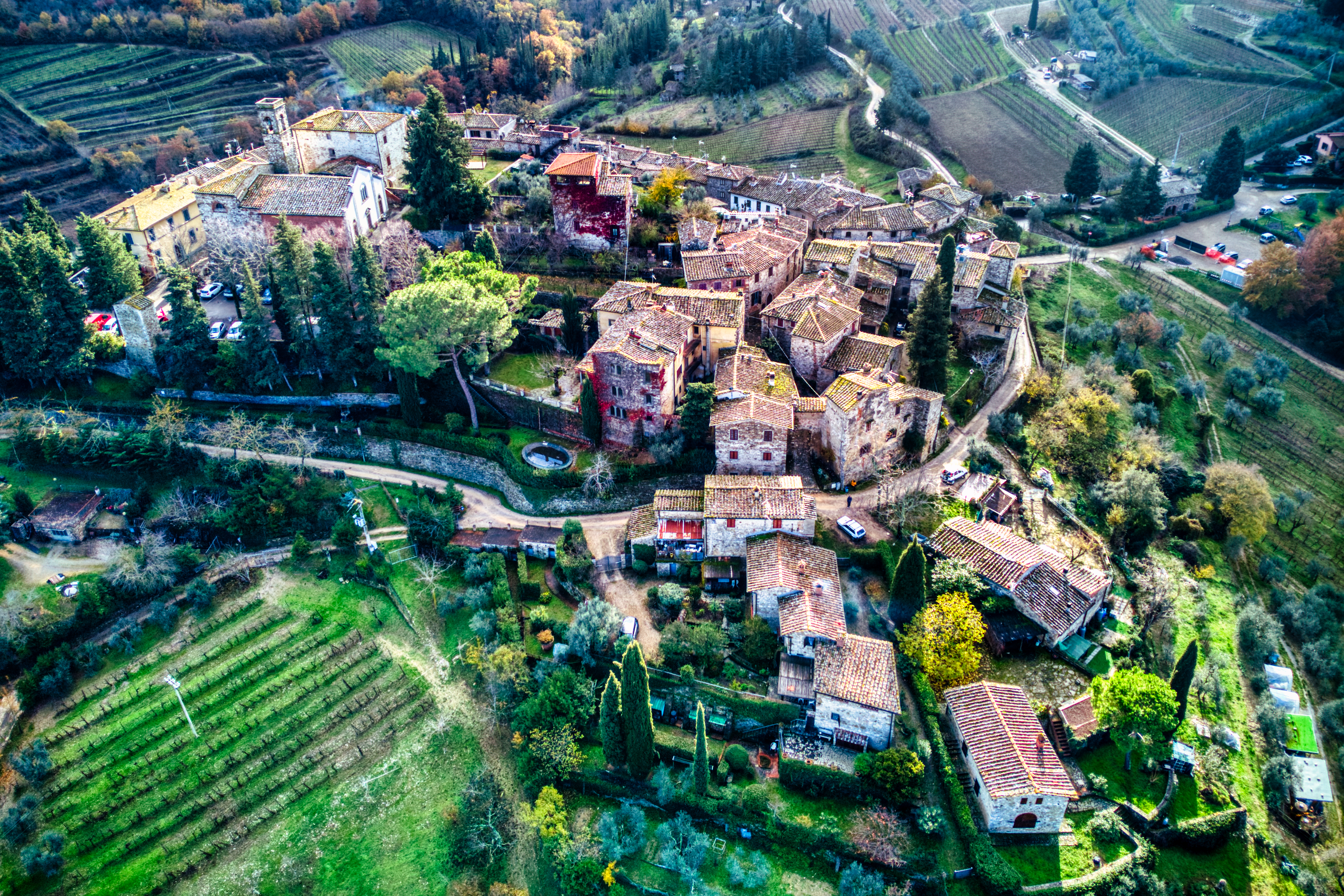
Montefioralle

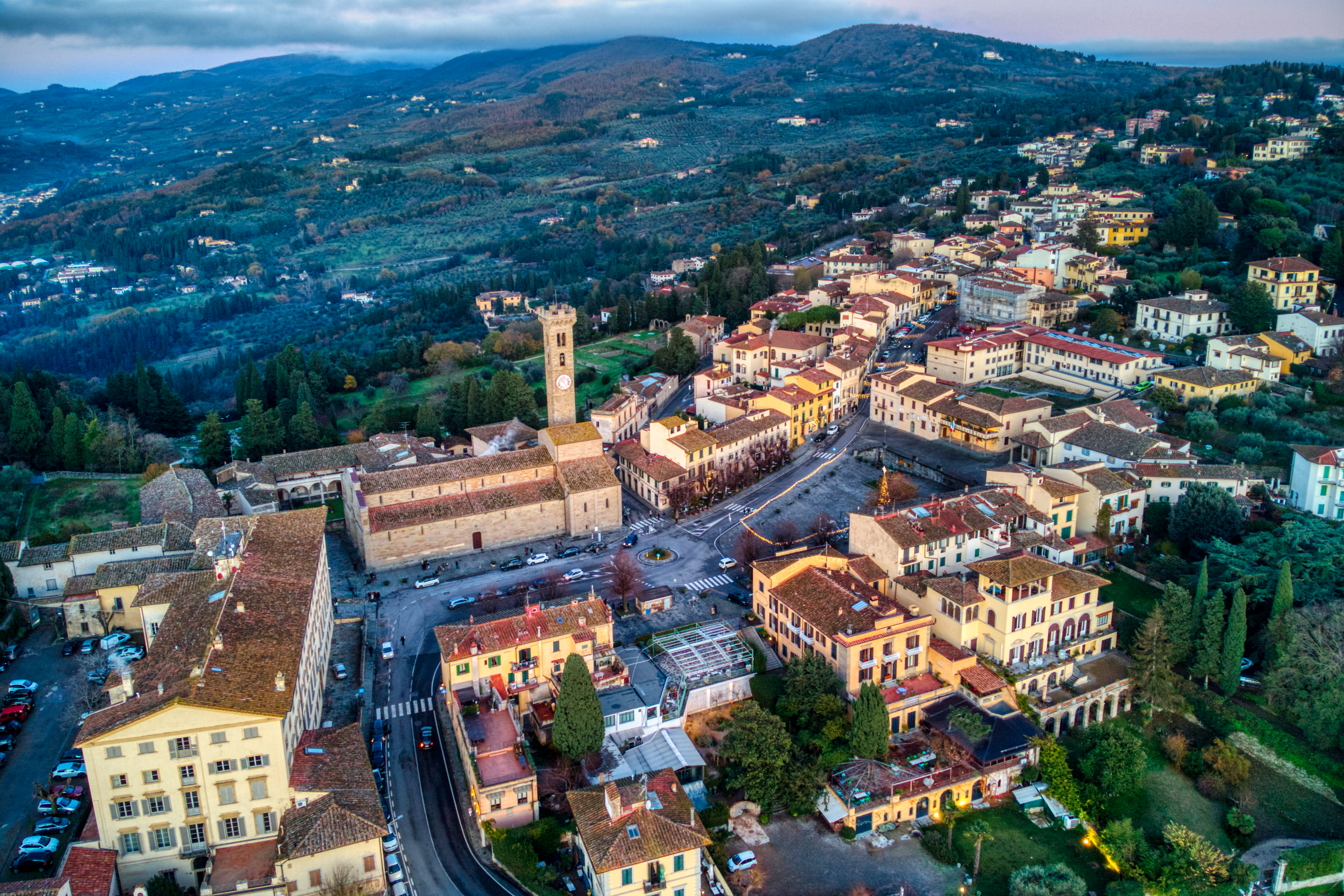
Fiesole

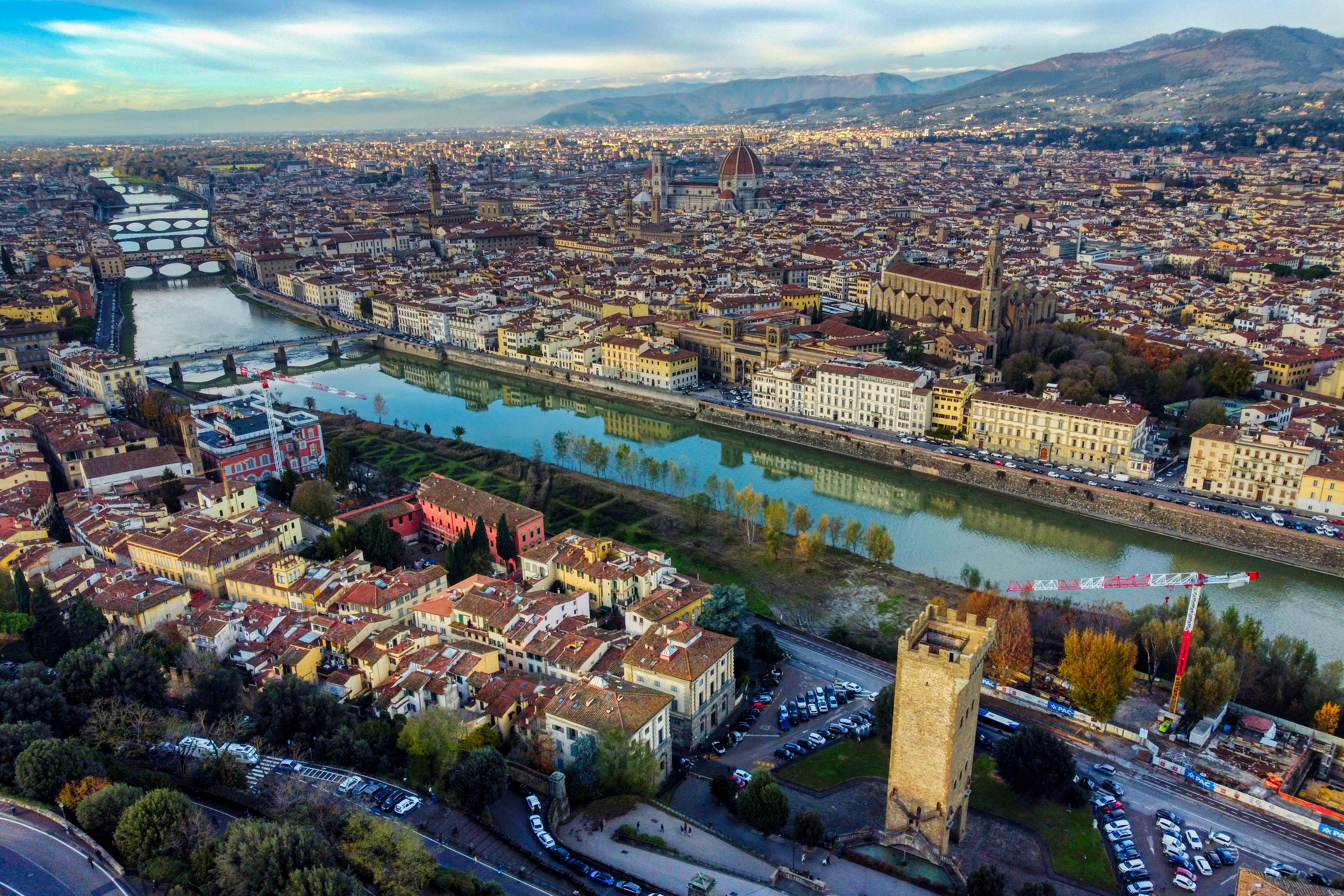
Florence

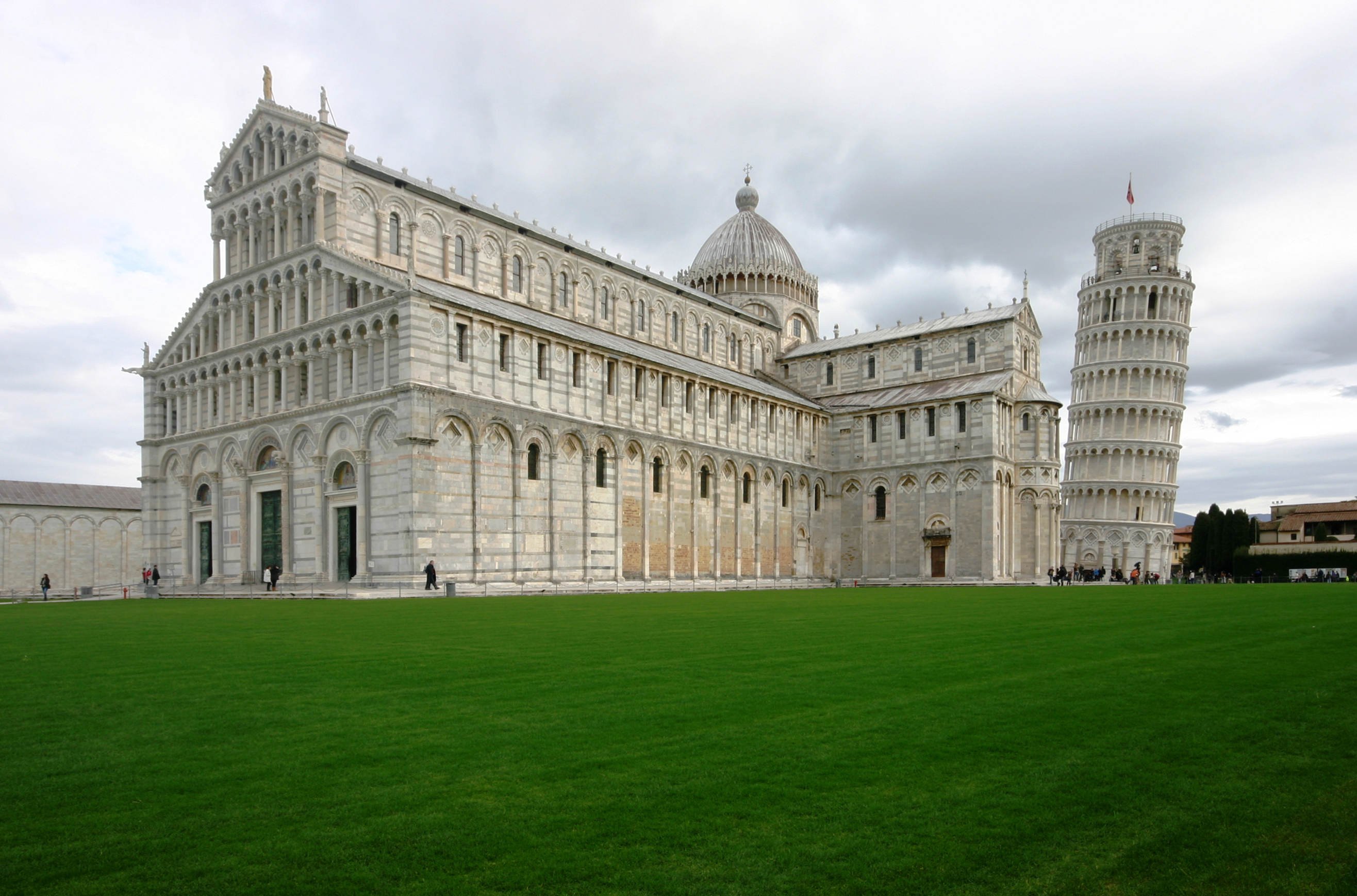
Pisa

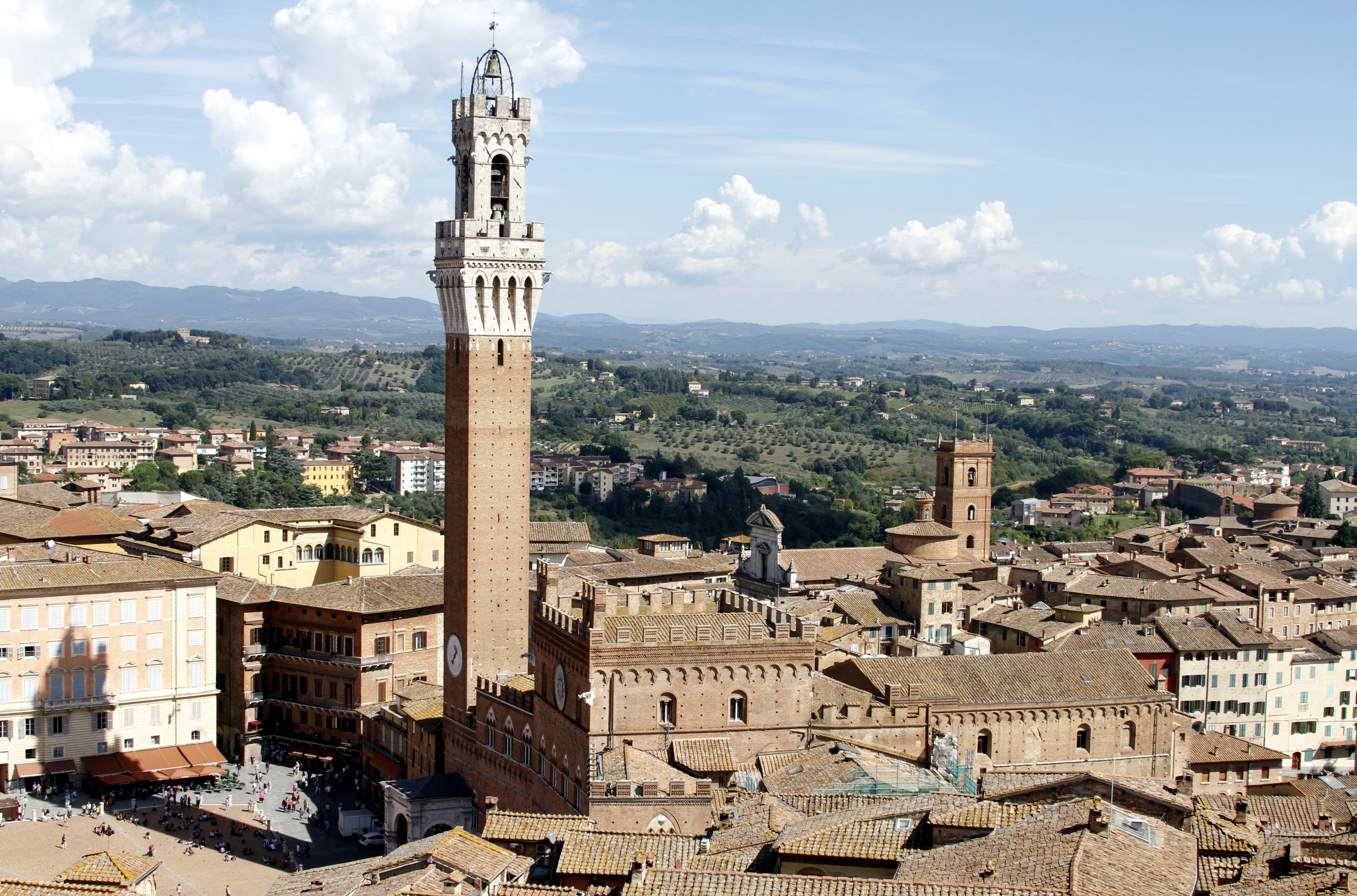
Siena
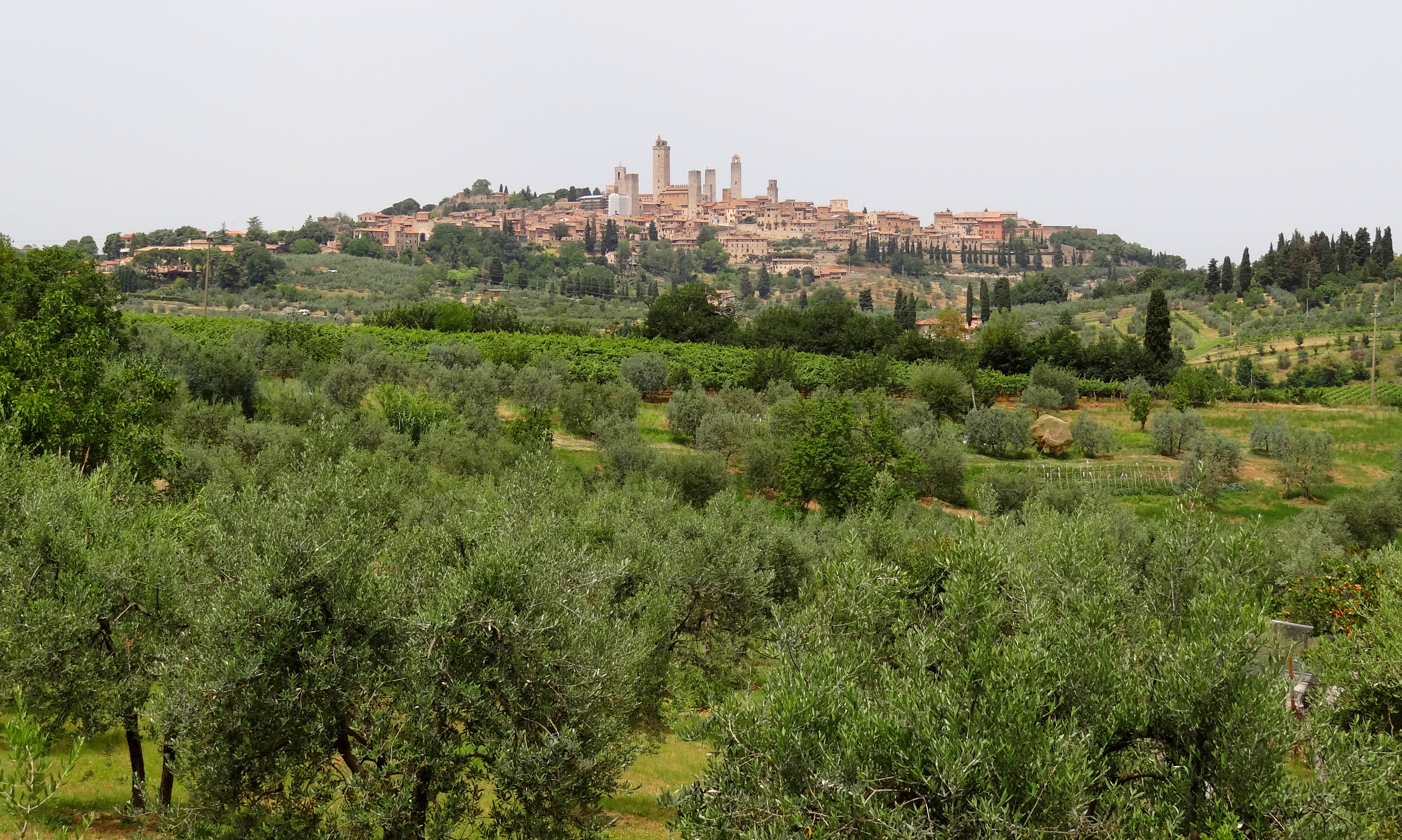
San Gimignano

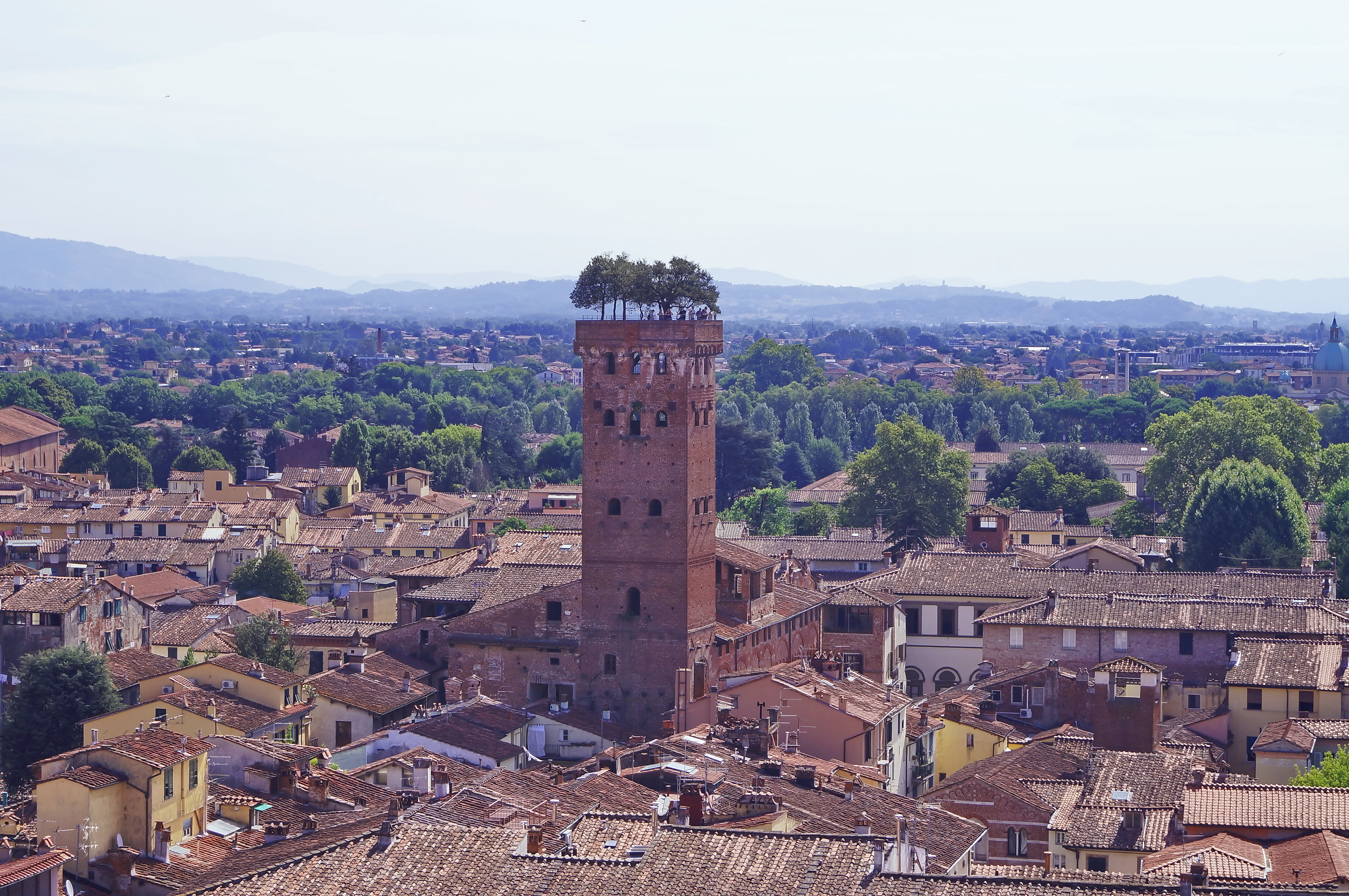
Lucca

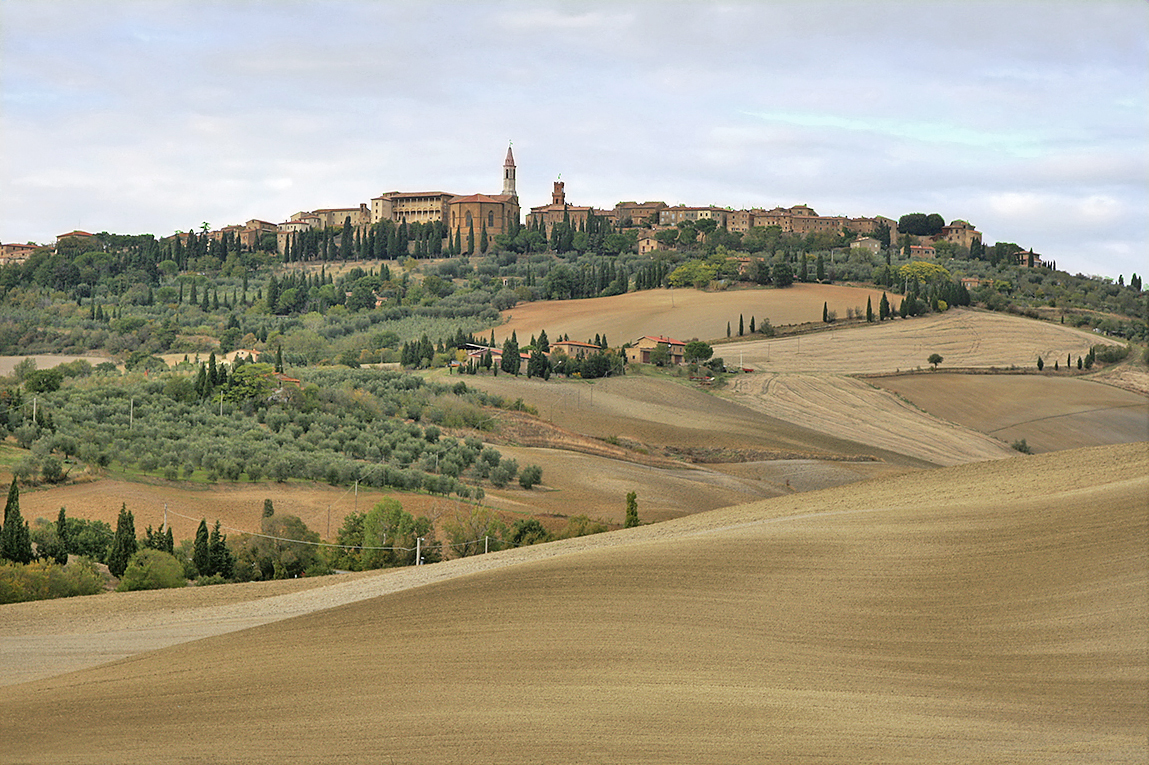
Pienza

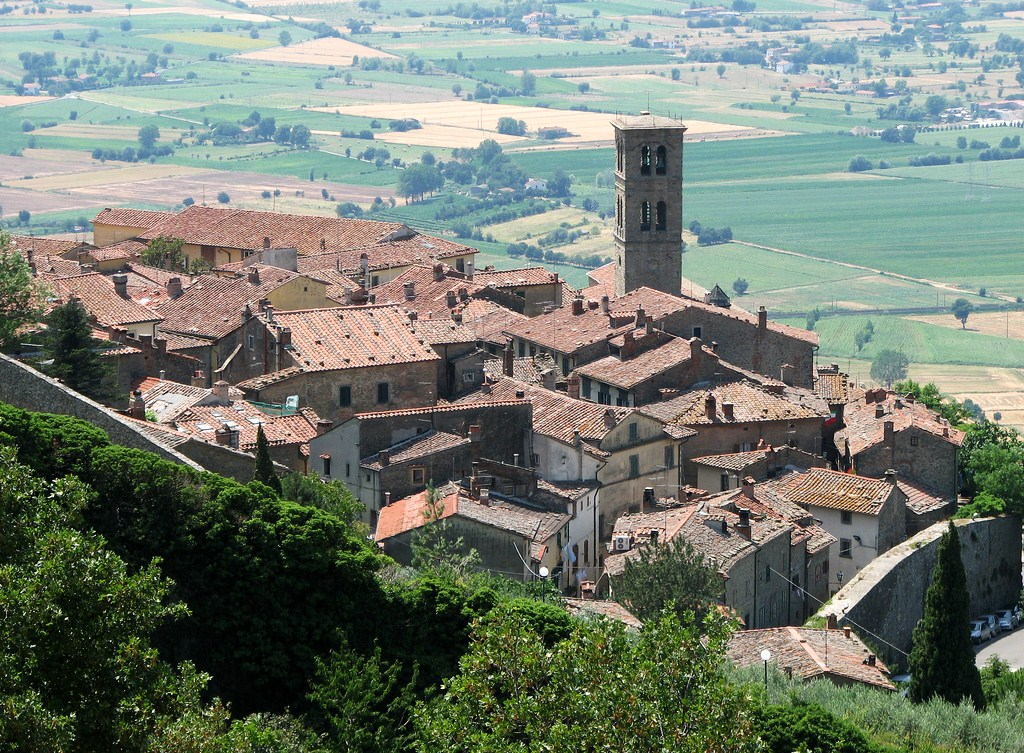
Cortona

=== Language ===
Apart from Tuscan being the standard model for Italy's national language (historically preferred over other languages of the peninsula), the Tuscan dialect (dialetto toscano) is spoken in Tuscany. The Italian language is actually literary Tuscan itself, specifically the Florentine dialect, only commonly referred to as Italian for political and nationalist reasons. It became the language of culture for all the people of Italy, thanks to the prestige of the masterpieces of Dante Alighieri, Petrarch, Giovanni Boccaccio, Niccolò Machiavelli, and Francesco Guicciardini. It would later become the official language of all the Italian states and of the Kingdom of Italy, when it was formed. Many Tuscan terms are also common in the Central Italian dialects of Umbria and some parts of Emilia Romagna.

=== Music ===
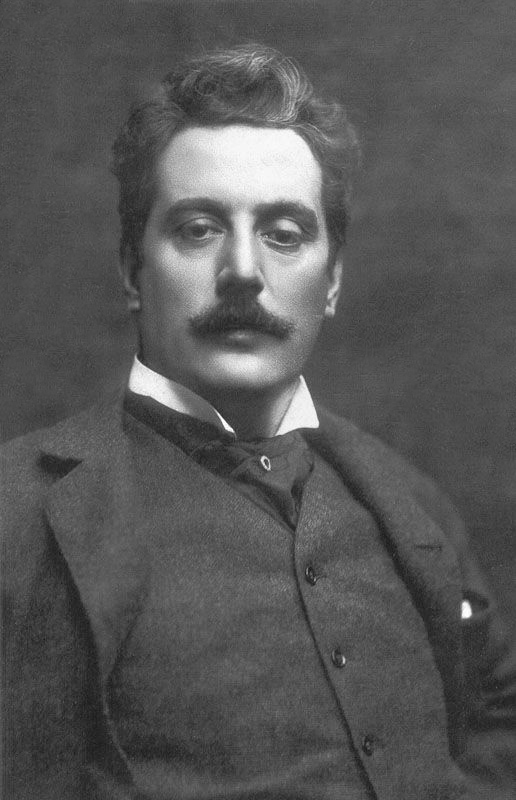
Giacomo Puccini

Tuscany has a rich ancient and modern musical tradition, and has produced numerous composers and musicians, including Giacomo Puccini and Pietro Mascagni. Florence is the main musical centre of Tuscany. The city was at the heart of much of the Western musical tradition. It was there that the Florentine Camerata convened in the mid-16th century and experimented with setting tales of Greek mythology to music and staging, resulting in the first operas, fostering the further development of the operatic form, and the later developments of separate "classical" forms such as the symphony.

There are numerous musical centres in Tuscany. Arezzo is indelibly connected with the name of Guido d'Arezzo, the 11th-century monk who invented modern musical notation and the do-re-mi system of naming notes of the scale; Lucca hosted possibly the greatest Italian composer of Verismo, Giacomo Puccini together with Alfredo Catalani, while Pietro Mascagni was born in Livorno; and Siena is well known for the Accademia Musicale Chigiana, an organization that currently sponsors major musical activities such as the Siena Music Week and the Alfredo Casella International Composition Competition. Other important musical centres in Tuscany include Pisa and Grosseto.

=== Literature ===
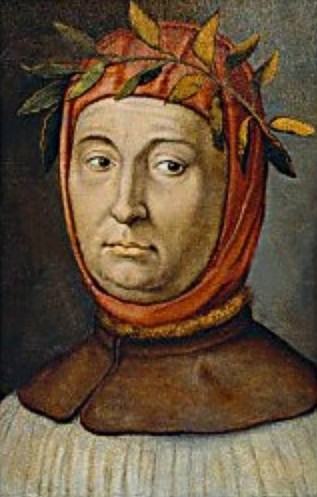
Tuscan poet and literary figure Petrarch

Several famous writers and poets are from Tuscany, most notably Florentine author Dante Alighieri. Tuscany's literary scene particularly thrived in the 13th century and the Renaissance.

In Tuscany, especially in the Middle Ages, popular love poetry existed. A school of imitators of the Sicilians was led by Dante da Maiano, but its literary originality took another line – that of humorous and satirical poetry. The democratic form of government created a style of poetry that stood against the medieval mystic and chivalrous style.

Another type of poetry also began in Tuscany. Guittone d'Arezzo made art abandon chivalry and Provençal forms for national motives and Latin forms. He attempted political poetry, and although his work is often obscure, he prepared the way for the Bolognese school. Bologna was the city of science, and philosophical poetry appeared there. Guido Guinizelli was the poet after the new fashion of the art. In his work, the ideas of chivalry are changed and enlarged. Only those whose heart is pure can be blessed with true love, regardless of class. He refuted the traditional credo of courtly love, for which love is a subtle philosophy only a few chosen knights and princesses could grasp. Love is blind to blasons but not to a good heart when it finds one: when it succeeds it is the result of the spiritual, not physical affinity between two souls. Guinizzelli's democratic view can be better understood in the light of the greater equality and freedom enjoyed by the city-states of the center-north and the rise of a middle class eager to legitimise itself in the eyes of the old nobility, still regarded with respect and admiration but dispossessed of its political power.

Guinizelli's Canzoni make up the bible of Dolce Stil Novo, and one in particular, "Al cor gentil" ("To a Kind Heart") is considered the manifesto of the new movement which would bloom in Florence under Cavalcanti, Dante and their followers. His poetry has some of the faults of the school of d'Arezzo. Nevertheless, he marks a great development in the history of Italian art, especially because of his close connection with Dante's lyric poetry.

In the 13th century, there were several major allegorical poems. One of these is by Brunetto Latini, who was a close friend of Dante. His Tesoretto is a short poem, in seven-syllable verses, rhyming in couplets, in which the author professes to be lost in a wilderness and to meet with a lady, who represents Nature, from whom he receives much instruction. We see here the vision, the allegory, the instruction with a moral object, three elements which we shall find again in the Divine Comedy. Francesco da Barberino, a learned lawyer who was secretary to bishops, a judge, and a notary, wrote two little allegorical poems, the Documenti d'amore and Del reggimento e dei costumi delle donne. The poems today are generally studied not as literature, but for historical context. A fourth allegorical work was the Intelligenza, which is sometimes attributed to Compagni but is probably only a translation of French poems.

In the 15th century, humanist and publisher Aldus Manutius published the Tuscan poets Petrarch and Dante Alighieri (Divine Comedy), creating the model for what became a standard for modern Italian.

=== Cuisine ===
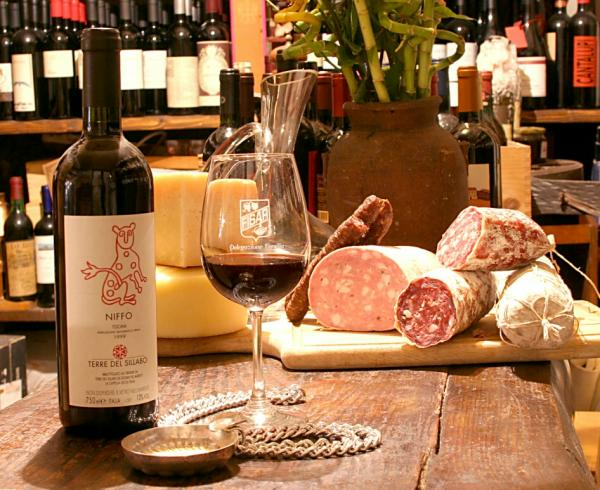
An assortment of Tuscan foods: various wine and cheese, and different sorts of salamis and hams

Simplicity is central to Tuscan cuisine. Legumes, bread, cheese, vegetables, mushrooms, and fresh fruit are used. Olive oil is made from Moraiolo, Leccino and Frantoiano olives. White truffles from San Miniato appear in October and November. Beef of the highest quality comes from the Chiana Valley, specifically, a breed known as Chianina used for Florentine steak. The indigenous Cinta Senese breed of pork is also produced.

Wine is a famous and common produce of Tuscany. The red wine Chianti is perhaps the most well-known internationally. Due to the many British tourists who come to the area where Chianti wine is produced this specific area has been nicknamed "Chiantishire".

=== Postage stamps ===
Between 1851 and 1860, the Grand Duchy of Tuscany, an independent Italian state until 1859 when it joined the United Provinces of Central Italy, produced two postage stamp issues which are among the most prized classic stamp issues of the world, and include the most valuable Italian stamp. The Grand Duchy of Tuscany was an independent Italian state from 1569 to 1859 but was occupied by France from 1808 to 1814. The Duchy comprised most of the present area of Tuscany, and its capital was Florence. In December 1859, the Grand Duchy officially ceased to exist, being joined to the duchies of Modena and Parma to form the United Provinces of Central Italy, which was annexed by the Kingdom of Sardinia a few months later in March 1860. In 1862 it became part of Italy and joined the Italian postal system.

== Economy ==
The gross domestic product (GDP) of the region was 117.5 billion euros in 2018, accounting for 6.7% of Italy's economic output. GDP per capita adjusted for purchasing power was 31,400 euros or 104% of the EU27 average in the same year. The GDP per employee was 106% of the EU average.

=== Unemployment rate ===
The unemployment rate stood at 7.3% in 2018 and was slightly lower than the national average.

Year	2006	2007	2008	2009	2010	2011	2012	2013	2014	2015	2016	2017	2018	2019
unemployment rate (in %)	4.8%	4.4%	5.0%	5.8%	6.0%	6.3%	7.8%	8.7%	10.1%	9.2%	9.5%	8.6%	7.3%	6.7%

=== Agriculture ===
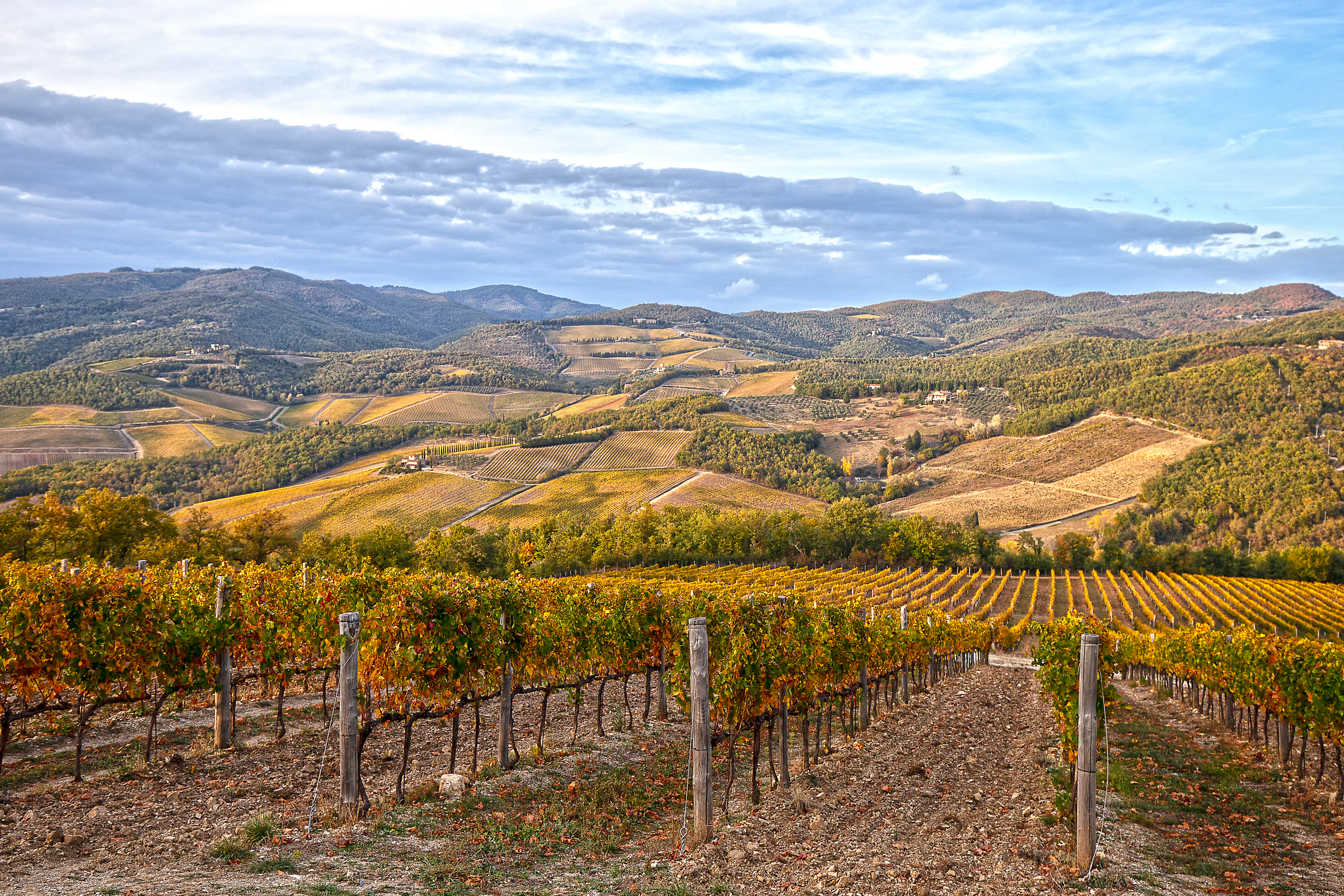
Vineyards in the Chianti region

The subsoil in Tuscany is relatively rich in mineral resources, with iron ore, copper, mercury, and lignite mines, the famous soffioni (fumarole) at Larderello, and the vast marble mines in Versilia. Although its share is falling all the time, agriculture still contributes to the region's economy. In the region's inland areas cereals, potatoes, olives, and grapes are grown. The swamplands, which used to be marshy, now produce vegetables, rice, tobacco, beets, and sunflowers.

=== Industry ===
One of the traditional foundations of the industrial sector is mining, given the abundance of underground resources. Also of note are textiles and clothing, chemicals and pharmaceuticals, steel and metalworking, glass and ceramics, and printing and publishing. Smaller areas specialising in manufacturing and craft industries are found in the hinterland: the leather and footwear area in the south-west part of the province of Florence, the hot-house plant area in Pistoia, the ceramics and textile industries in the Prato area, scooters, and motorcycles in Pontedera, and the processing of timber for the manufacture of wooden furniture in the Cascina area. The heavy industries (mining, steel, and mechanical engineering) are concentrated along the coastal strip (Livorno and Pisa areas), where there are also important chemical industries. Also of note are the marble (Carrara area) and paper industries (Lucca area).

=== Tourism ===
In Tuscany 80% of tourism demand is concentrated in cities of art and seaside resorts; the rest is divided between the countryside, hills, and mountains. In 2019 the municipalities with the relatively higher percentage of presences, in descending order, are: Florence, Pisa, Montecatini Terme, Castiglione della Pescaia, San Vincenzo, Orbetello, Grosseto, Siena, Bibbona, Viareggio, Capoliveri. In the Tuscan tourist areas, together with the Florentine area, the Etruscan Coast holds the relatively largest share of presences, immediately followed by Maremma (Monte Argentario, Giglio Island, Talamone, Capalbio), Terre di Pisa and Elba.

Tuscany has many small and picturesque villages; 29 of them have been selected by I Borghi più belli d'Italia (English: The most beautiful Villages of Italy), a non-profit private association of small Italian towns of strong historical and artistic interest that was founded on the initiative of the Tourism Council of the National Association of Italian Municipalities.

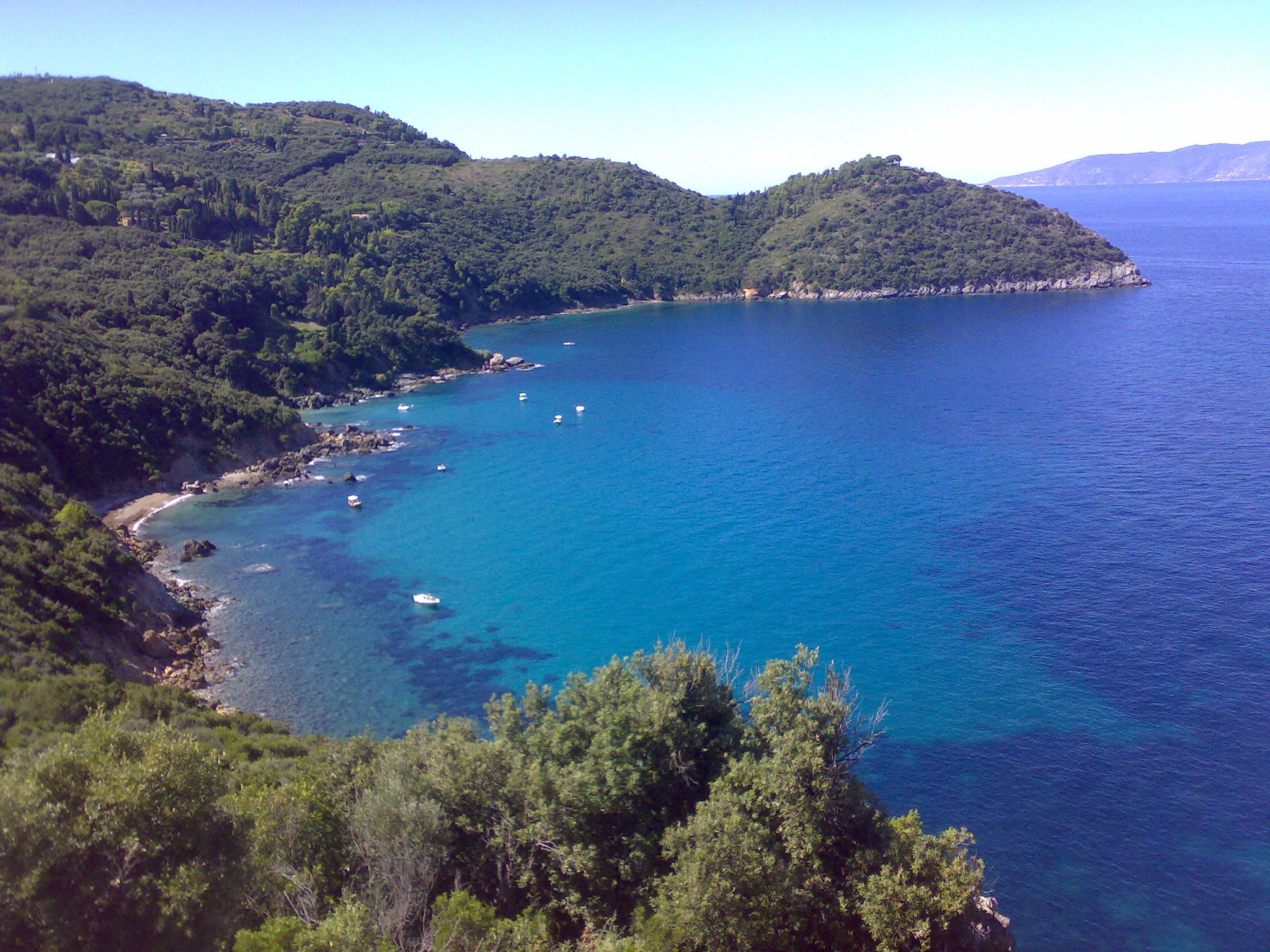
Monte Argentario

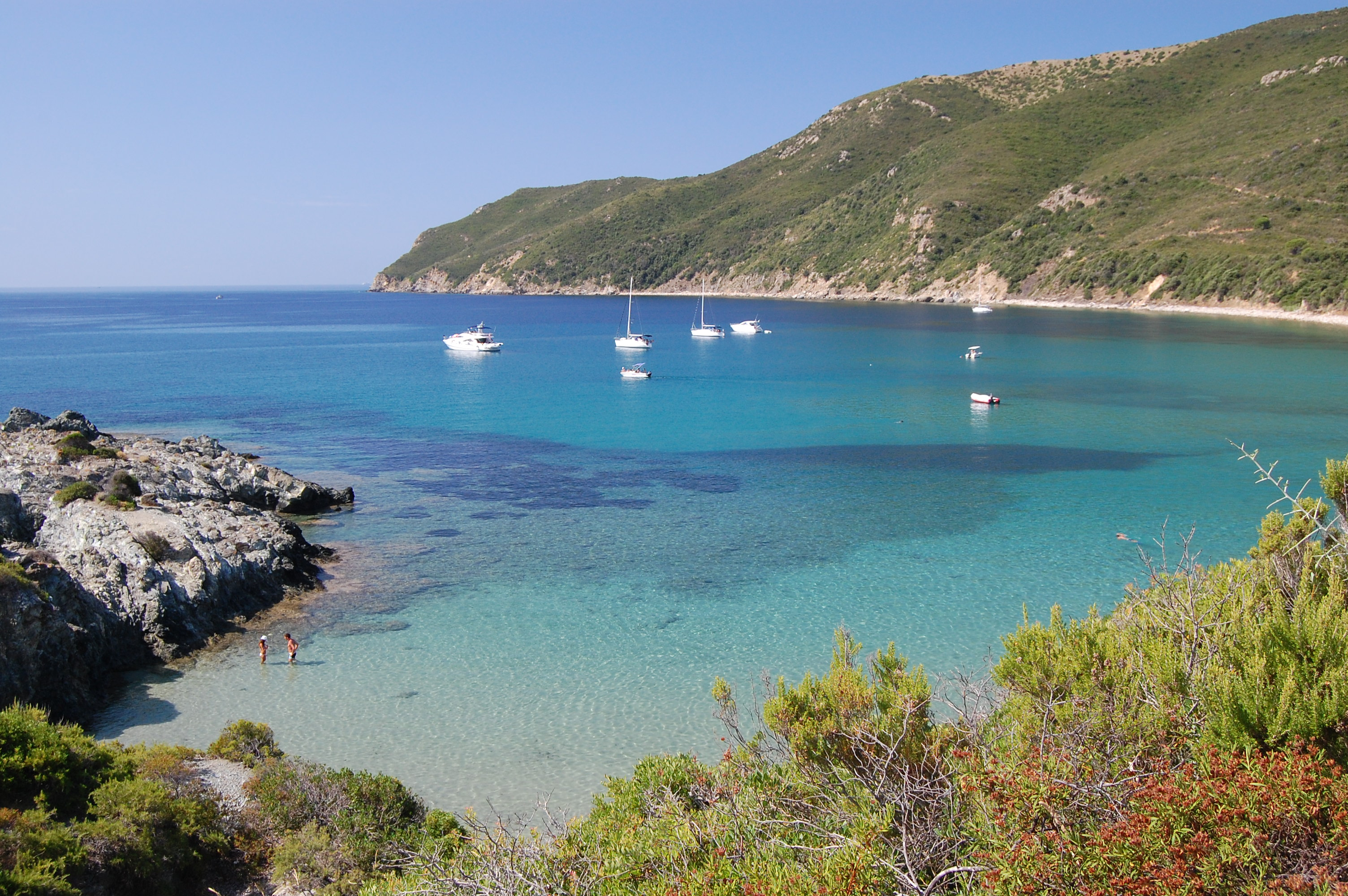
Elba

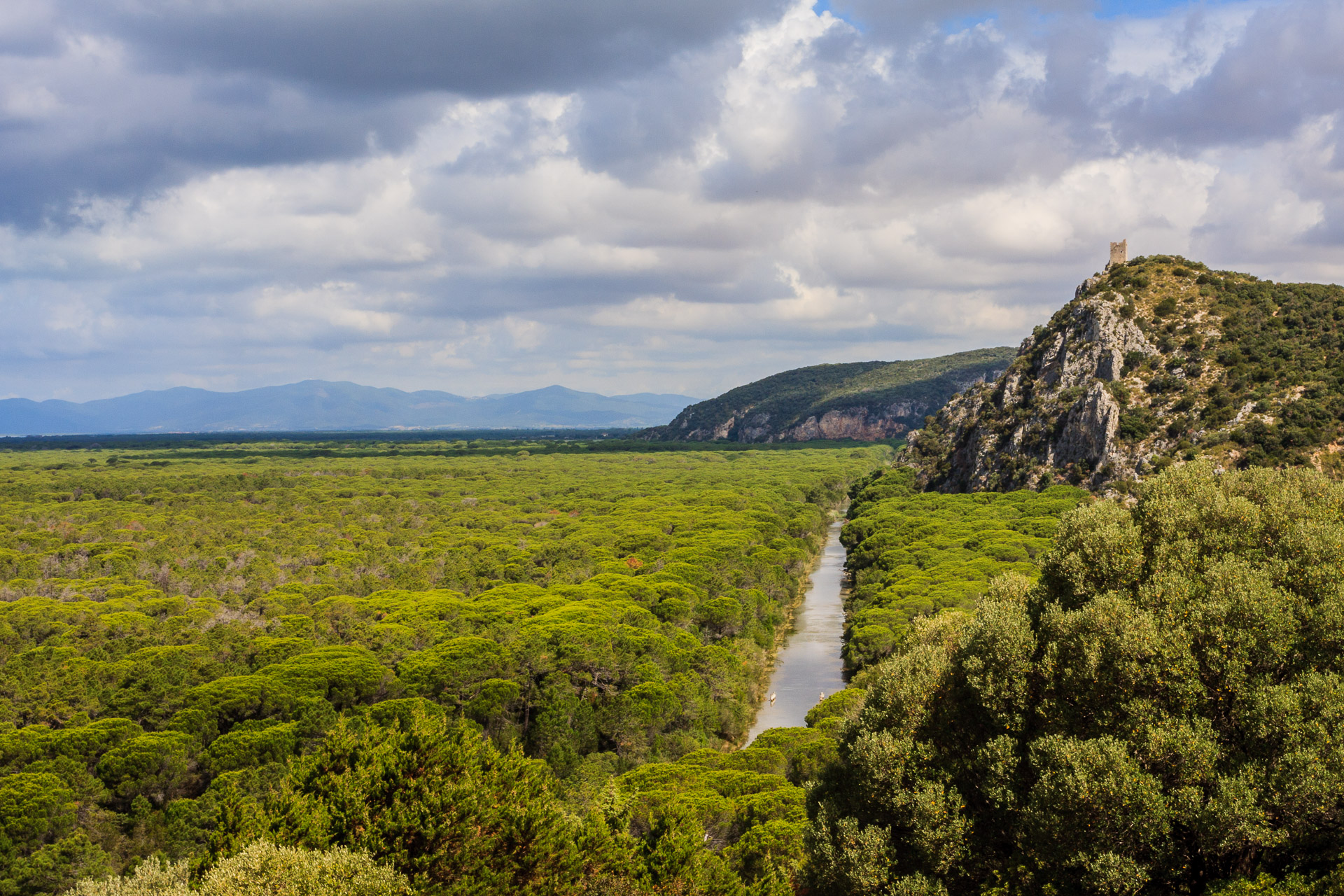
Maremma Regional Park

=== Fashion ===
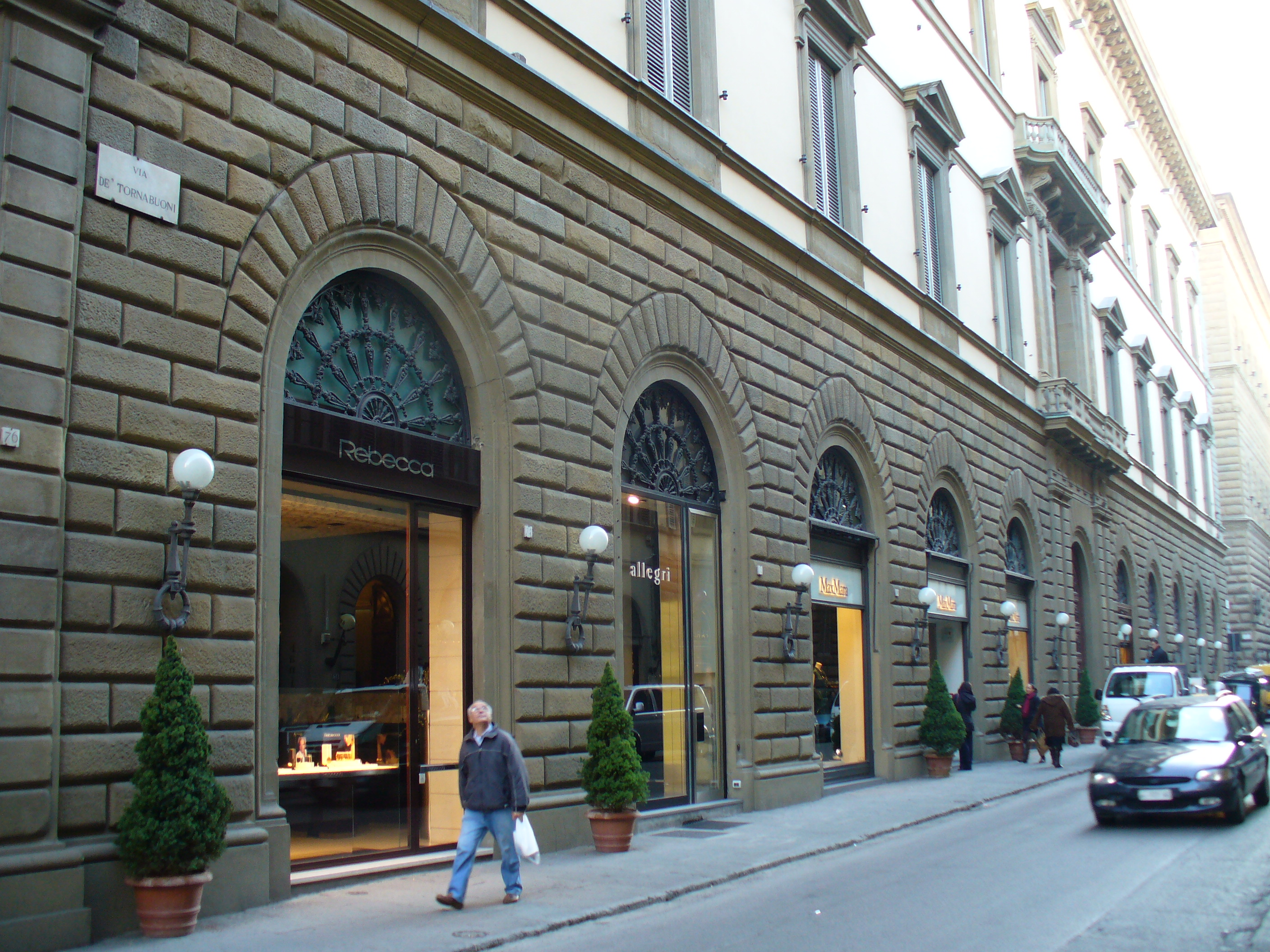
The Via de' Tornabuoni in Florence, the city's top fashion and shopping street, contains some of the world's most luxurious clothing and jewelry houses, such as Cartier, Ferragamo, Gucci, Versace and Bulgari.

The fashion and textile industry are the pillars of the Florentine economy. In the 15th century, Florentines were working with luxury textiles such as wool and silk. Today the greatest designers in Europe utilize the textile industry in Tuscany, and especially Florence. A large plant of production is happening in the city of Prato.

Italy has one of the strongest textile industries in Europe, accounting for approximately one-quarter of European production. Its turnover is over 25 billion euros. It is the third largest supplier of clothing after China and Japan. The Italian fashion industry generates 60% of its turnover abroad.

=== Transport ===
The region has two main airports:

- Pisa International Airport is the busiest airport in the region, with 5.5 million passengers served in 2024.
- Florence Airport is the second-busiest airport. It served 3.5 million passengers in 2024.

Marina di Campo Airport is a small airport serving the island of Elba. The airport provides direct routes to the Italian mainland which are operated by Silver Air.

== See also ==
- Cities and towns in Tuscany
- List of municipalities of Tuscany
- Tuscan Archipelago
- People from Tuscany
- Neoclassical architecture in Tuscany
