= Amarilli, mia bella =

1602 Italian aria by Giulio Caccini

Amarilli, mia bella in Caccini's Le nuove musiche (1602)

"Amarilli, mia bella" (Italian for "Amaryllis, my beauty", among others (Note: Alternate names include "Amarilli, my fair one"; "Amarilli, my beloved"; and "Amarilli, my lovely one".)) is a 1602 Italian-language aria and solo madrigal by Giulio Caccini.

== Composition ==
"Amarilli, mia bella" was composed in 1602 by Giulio Caccini (c. 1546–1618). It is the eighth song in Caccini's Le nuove musiche, published in July 1602. The most common version of "Amarilli, mia bella" is a monody, being written for only one voice; however, six- and three-voice versions of the song were also printed. Caccini wrote a limited accompaniment consisting only of continuo in figured bass. Much of the song is left open to interpretation.

The lyrics of the song are in the Italian language. The text may have been written by either Giovanni Battista Guarini or his son Alessandro Guarini in the 1580s or 1590s.

The lyrics begin with the singer chiding his lover (Amarilli) for doubting his love for her. The beginning of the song is in a minor key. By the end of the text, the song emerges into G major as the narrator reaffirms his devotion to his lover. This modulation runs throughout the song and was written to maximise the song's emotional power. The song takes an ABBC form. "Amarilli, mia bella" is located in the Hypodorian mode, transposed into G. Its range stays largely within the perfect fifth running from D to G, only diverging to create an effect of dramaticity.

Original Italian
Amarilli, mia bella,
Non credi, o del mio cor dolce desio,
D'esser tu l'amor mio?
Credilo pur: e se timor t'assale,
Dubitar non ti vale. (Note: In some versions, this line reads Prendi questo mio strale.)
Aprimi il petto e vedrai scritto in core:
Amarilli, Amarilli, Amarilli
è il mio amore.

Poetic translation
Amarilli, my fair one,
Canst thou thine heart to doubt e'er surrender,
Doubt of my love, true and tender?
Do but believe, for should e'er fear as sail thee,
It can never avail thee,
Ope thou my bosom, and see thy fears reproved;
On my heart 'tis writ,
"Amarilli, my beloved!"

== Legacy ==
"Amarilli, mia bella" is one of Caccini's best known pieces. It has been iterated upon by many other composers, including Johann Nauwach and Peter Philips. The song has remained popular and has been translated into many languages.

A version of "Amarilli" is also found in Egerton 2971, along with another of Caccini's songs, "Dolcissimo sospiro". The version printed in Egerton 2971 is more ornamentalised than Caccini's original, and the words progress more slowly due to extended embellishment. Throughout the song the ornamentation gets more extreme, with the harmonies in the coda differing substantially from the original.

"Amarilli, mia bella" features in the 24 Italian Songs and Arias of the 17th and 18th Centuries, a common teaching book for vocal students. The song is commonly performed by vocal beginners.
