= Euridice (Caccini) =

Opera by Giulio Caccini

Euridice is an opera in a prologue and one act by the Italian composer Giulio Caccini. The libretto, by Ottavio Rinuccini, had already been set by Caccini's rival Jacopo Peri in 1600. Caccini's version of Euridice was first performed at the Pitti Palace, Florence, on 5 December 1602. Caccini hurriedly prepared the score for the press and published it six weeks before Peri's version appeared.

== Background ==
Caccini was a part of the Florentine Camerata, a group of intellectuals who worked to revive Greek drama through music. The group was inspired by Girolamo Mei, who theorized that Ancient Greek drama was predominately sung in a style that fell between speech and song. This played a crucial part in developing recitative, which would later become the basis of future opera.

=== Caccini's work before Euridice ===
Caccini’s first opera was Il Rapimento di Cefalo, an opera based on the classical myth of Cephalus and Aurora. According to Dr. Tim Carter, only a small part of this opera survives and that is why little is known about this work. Dr. Carter also mentioned that Guilio Caccini’s works are overlooked by historians as Caccini had a notorious history with Peri and his own setting of Euridice that caused historians to criticize Caccini.

=== Euridice ===
Euridice was presented as the culmination of roughly a decade of the Florentine Camerata’s experimentation with reviving ancient drama and music, combined with the practical requirements of courtly pastoral entertainments. The 1600 version (written by Peri, Rinuccini, and Caccini) was performed for the marriage of Maria de’ Medici, since the Medici court sought to showcase political prestige through large-scale artistic spectacles. Rather than relying on the traditional structure of spoken comedy with intermedi, the wedding festivities presented two newly conceived favole in musica: Euridice and the mythological Il rapimento di Cefalo. These works represented a shift toward more continuous musical drama within Florentine court entertainment. The production was staged and organized in the Palazzo Pitti, with a collaborative and competitive network of poets, patrons, and musicians involved in mounting the work. Caccini’s version was performed on December 5th, 1602, according to “Il luogo teatrale a Firenze”.

== Roles ==
Roles, voice types
Role	Voice type
La Tragedia (Tragedy)	soprano
Orfeo	tenor
Euridice	soprano
Arcetro	castrato
Tirsi	tenor
Aminta	tenor
Dafne	soprano
Pluto	bass
Caronte (Charon)	tenor
Proserpina (Proserpine)	soprano
Radamanto (Rhadamanthus)	bass
Venere (Venus)	soprano

== Synopsis ==
The opera follows the myth of Orpheus and Eurydice quite closely, except that it has a happy ending since Orpheus succeeds in rescuing Eurydice from the underworld through the power of his music. Caccini’s version of Euridice is often described not as an Opera in 3 acts, but as one act with a prologue and six scenes. The opera opens in Arcadia, where nymphs and shepherds gather to celebrate the wedding of Orfeo and Euridice. Their festivities are interrupted when Daphne arrives with news that Euridice has been fatally bitten by a serpent while walking in a meadow. Orfeo, overwhelmed by grief, resolves to recover her from the underworld. With the assistance of Venus, Orfeo descends to the realm of the dead and petitions Pluto and Proserpina to restore Euridice’s life. Moved by his plea and by the power of his music, the rulers of the underworld agree to release her. In Arcadia, the shepherds mourn Euridice and fear Orfeo may not return. Arcetro eventually announces that Orfeo is approaching with Euridice restored to life. The community receives the couple and resumes the celebration of their marriage.

The prologue, sung by La Tragedia, sets out the moral intention of the drama. The six scenes are as follows:

- Scene 1 – Arcadian festivities for the wedding; Euridice’s death is announced.
- Scene 2 – Orfeo mourns and resolves to retrieve Euridice from the underworld.
- Scene 3 – Shepherds reflect on Euridice’s fate and wonder about Orfeo’s journey.
- Scene 4 – Orfeo meets Venus, reaches the underworld, and pleads with Pluto and Proserpina; Euridice is granted release.
- Scene 5 – Shepherds await Orfeo’s return.
- Scene 6 – Orfeo returns with Euridice; the celebrations resume.

== Rivalry with Jacobo Peri ==
Jacopo Peri’s Euridice was used for entertainment at the wedding King Henry IV of France. Giulio Caccini wanted the same for his operas, so he wrote the exact opera, but with more melismas and longer. Caccini rushed to have his opera printed first so that by the time Peri’s opera came out, he refused to let his students go to see Peri’s version. In addition, according to Peri, Caccini had forced singers to sing in his production so that they would be unable to perform in Peri’s. Caccini and Peri both were thought of as difficult and arrogant and overall hard to work with.

== Composition ==
Giulio Caccini had a significant part in founding the genre of opera and the transition of musical style in the Baroque period. Caccini developed the style of single melodic lines with simple chord accompaniment. He also created a style of singing that imitated speech; recitative. Caccini sought a direct and emotional expression, and gave more freedom to the interpreter rather than giving them exact instruction. He simplified the polyphony and innovated with using basso continuo as a harmonic base for singing. All of Caccini's musical ideas can be heard and found clearly within Euridice.

=== Libretto ===
The texts from both operas are exactly the same, they just follow different rhythms and different melody lines. Both composers use dotted sixteenth notes in melismatic sections, eighth notes for momentum, and in cadences, a lot of the time, the intentions are the same i.e., stressing “...manti” (2, Caccini) and (3, Peri). Caccini really drags out the sections.

=== Orfeo's Musical Importance ===
While the opera is named after the character Euridice, the character of Orfeo holds a lot of importance as his recitative “Antri ch’a miei lamenti” is 22 lines, almost as long as Euridice’s entire role. In both versions of Euridice, both composers use G as the final tonal center as well as using G to connect each scene. Caccini begins each new recitative by using the harmony from the previous speech giving Caccini’s interpretation of the character of Orfeo a more reactive characterization.

== Instrumentation ==
The score reflects early Florentine monodic style and uses a flexible ensemble rather than a fixed orchestra. The original printed score contains only the vocal lines and a basso continuo part. Typical instruments used in performances of Euridice include:

- Chitarrone or theorbo
- Harpsichord
- Lute
- Harp
- Viola da gamba or another bass viol

Historically informed performance often suggests the addition of other plucked instruments doubling the basso continuo line. Contemporary performances have included modern melodic instruments, including members of the “viola da braccio” family (i.e., violins, cellos) and flutes to reinforce ritornelli or sinfonias. However, these are not specified in the surviving score.

== Recordings ==
The 2008 Ricercar label recording of Euridice features vocalists Nicolas Achten, Olivier Berten, Magid El-Bushra, Reinoud van Mechelen, Laurence Renson, Marie de Roy, and Céline Vieslet.

Track No.	Title	Characters	Duration
1	Sinfonia		1:18
2	Prologo: Io, che d'alti sospir vaga	La Tragedia	4:01
3	Scene 1: Ninfe, ch'i bei crin d'oro	Shepherd, Nymph, Chorus	3:17
4	Scene 1: Donne, ch'ha miei diletti	Euridice, Shepherd	2:30
5	Scene 1: Itene liete pur	Nymph, Chorus, Shepherd	4:18
6	Scene 2: Antri, ch'ha miei lamenti	Orfeo, Arcetro, Tirsi	5:35
7	Scene 2: Lassa, che di spavento	Dafne, Arcetro, Orfeo, Shepherd	7:28
8	Scene 2: Non piango, e non sospiro	Orfeo	1:27
9	Scene 2: Dunque e pur ver	Nymph, Aminta, Shepherd, Chorus, Two Nymphs	8:16
10	Scene 3: Se fato invido e rio	Arcetro, Shepherd	4:41
11	Scene 3: A te, qual tu ti sia	Shepherd, Chorus, Nymph	2:53
12	Scene 4: Scorto da immortal guida	Venere, Orfeo	2:11
13	Scene 4: Funeste piagge	Orfeo	3:59
14	Scene 4: Ond’e cotanto ardire	Plutone, Orfeo	5:10
15	Scene 4: O re, nel cui sembiante	Proserpina, Orfeo, Plutone, Radamanto, Caronte	5:37
16	Scene 4: Poi che gli eterni imperi	Infernal Shades, Deities	2:42
17	Scene 5: Già del bel carro ardente	Arcetro, Shepherd, Aminta	3:58
18	Scene 5: Quando al tempio n'andaste	Aminta, Shepherd	4:02
19	Scene 6: Gioite al canto mio	Orfeo, Nymph, Euridice, Shepherd, Dafne, Aminta	4:40
20	Scene 6: Biondo arcier	Chorus	1:07

- Euridice Soloists, Rennes Chorus and Orchestra, conducted by Rodrigo de Zayas (Arion, 1980)
- L'Euridice Scherzi Musicali, Nicolas Achten (Ricercar, 2008)
