= Giulio Romano (disambiguation) =

Guilio Romano may refer to:

- Giulio Romano (c. 1499 – 1546), an Italian painter
- Giulio Romano (composer) (fl. 1612 – c. 1613), an Italian composer
- Giulio Romano, another name for the Italian composer Giulio Caccini (1551–1618)
