= Bence Szabolcsi =

Hungarian historian

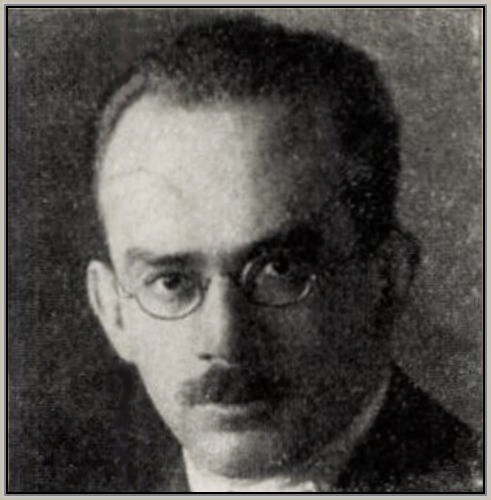

Bence Szabolcsi (2 August 1899 – 21 January 1973) was a Hungarian music historian. Along with Ervin Major, "he can be considered the founder of scholarly study of the history of Hungarian music, and he was primarily responsible for creating an establishment for musicology in Hungary."

Szabolcsi was born in Budapest, the younger son of Miksa Szabolcsi (1856-1915), editor of the Hungarian Jewish weekly Egyenlőség. After studies in Budapest, he studied music theory and composition with Sigfrid Karg-Elert at the Leipzig conservatoire and musicology at Leipzig University, gaining a doctorate in 1923 with a thesis on the Italian monodist composers Piero Benedetti and Claudio Saracini. Hermann Abert was his supervisor. Szabolcsi edited the first music dictionary in Hungarian, established the Department of Musicology at the Franz Liszt Academy of Music in 1951, and established the Bartók Archive in 1961.

== Works ==
- The Twilight of Ferenc Liszt, 1956
- A Concise History of Hungarian Music, 1964
- Béla Bartók: his life in pictures, 1964
- A History of Melody, 1965
