= Giulio Romano (composer) =

Italian composer

Giulio Romano (fl. 1612 – c. 1613) was an Italian composer of the early 17th century.

== Scholarship on Romano ==
Giulio Romano has sometimes been confused in scholarship with the composer Giulio Caccini who also went by the name of Giulio Romano during portions of his life. He has also been confused with the composers Romano da Siena and Alessandro Merlo; the latter of whom also used the surname Romano.

Giulio Romano composed seven Concenti spiriti which were arranged for one to six voices. These were published in Venice in 1612 but are now lost. His Fuggilotio musicale (published in either 1612 or 1613 in Venice) was at one time attributed to Caccini, but is now attributed to Romano after the misattribution to Caccini was identified by scholarship published in 1972. This work consists of eighteen monodies and fourteen duets; including madrigals, arias, and romanesca.

Nothing else is known about the composer beyond these publications.
