= Claudio Saracini =

Italian composer

Claudio Saracini (1 July 1586 – 20 September 1630) was an Italian composer, lutenist, and singer of the early Baroque era. He was one of the most famous and distinguished composers of monody.

== Life ==
Saracini was born to a noble family, probably in Siena. Little is known for certain about his education, but it is presumed that he traveled widely while he was young, for not only did he establish numerous foreign connections—as evidenced by his dedications of music to foreign aristocrats—but he absorbed some of the musical styles of the lands he visited. He seems never to have held a professional musical position of which record has survived; indeed he seems to have been an extraordinarily talented amateur, one who was admired even by Claudio Monteverdi. The references to Saracini as "Il Palusi" seem to indicate that he was a member of an academy, although further details are lacking.

All of his music was published in Venice between 1614 and 1624.

== Music and influence ==
Of his music, 133 songs have survived, and all are monodies—secular compositions for solo voice, generally sung in a highly ornamented style, with instrumental accompaniment. All but one are in Italian, and encompass a wide range of texts, including serious, humorous, and erotic. His style varies from diatonic to chromatic, and is comparable to that of contemporary monodist Sigismondo d'India in its experimental qualities.

A unique feature of Saracini's compositions is the occasional influence of folk music, including that of the Balkans, an extreme rarity in early Italian Baroque music. Presumably he heard folk music in those regions when he traveled there during his youth. This influence is most evident in his strophic songs, one of which is in 5/4 (although actually notated in duple meter); asymmetrical meters are a normal feature of Balkan folk music but are absent in Italian.

Saracini's works have had a resurgence of interest in the 20th century, after a long period of neglect. His experimental idiom first attracted the attention of musicologists, and later, performers; his compositions are now recorded relatively frequently, often on collections containing works of other composers of the same era, such as Monteverdi or Alessandro Grandi.
