= Bardo Corsi =

- First Marquis of Caiazzo
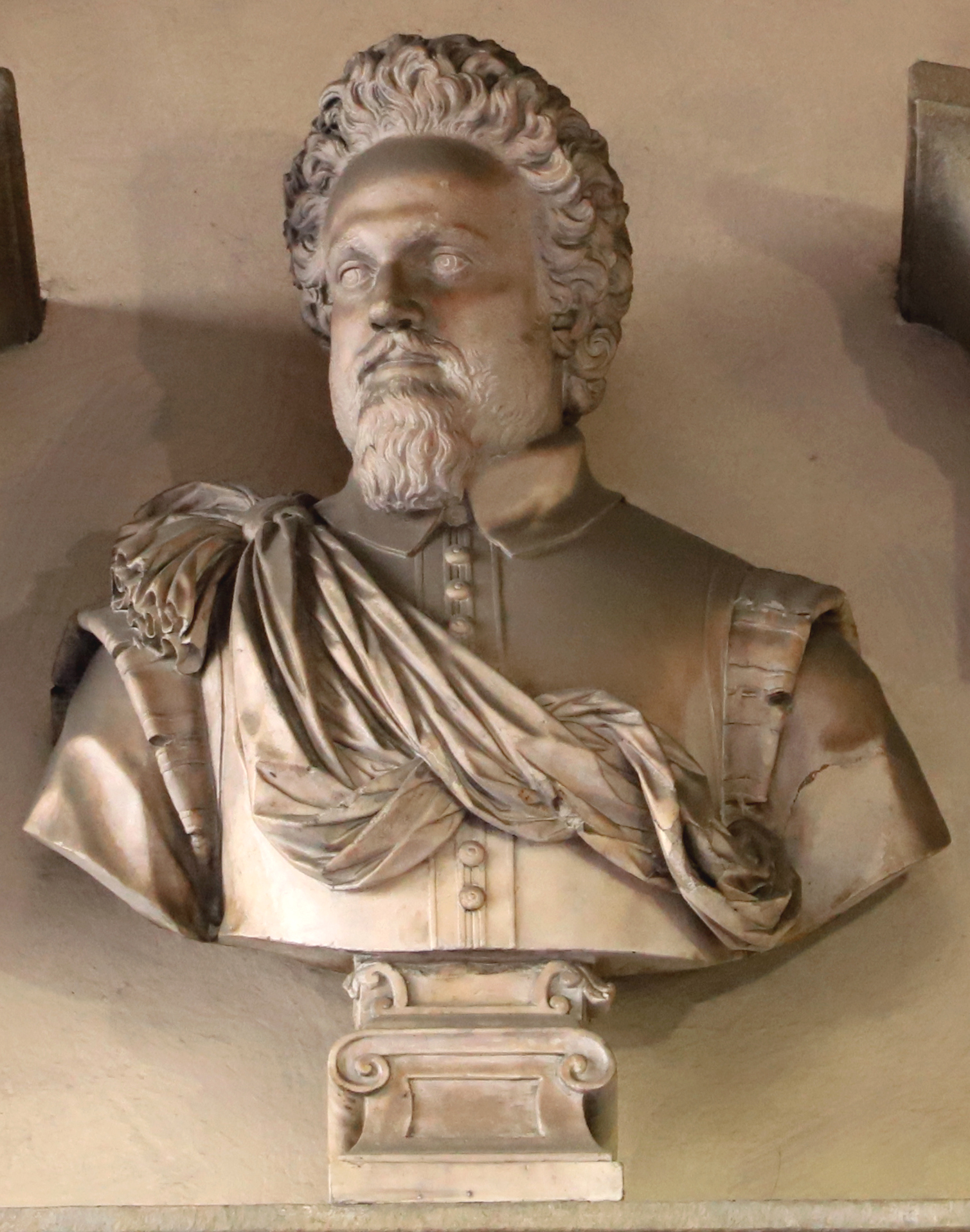
- Bardo Corsi by Giovanni Caccini
- Born: 27 May 1566; Florence, Italy
- Died: 1 March 1624 (aged 57); Florence, Italy
- Adopted the brother's Jacopo Corsi children: Giulia Corsi (b. 1591); Settimia Corsi (b. 1597); Maria Corsi (b. 1599); Marquis Giovanni Corsi of Caiazzo (b. 1600); Lorenzo Corsi (b. 1601); Nun Alessandra Corsi (b. 1602)
- House: Corsi
- Father: Giovanni Corsi
- Mother: Alessandra Della Gherardesca
- Religion: Catholic
- Occupation: Patron, marquis, merchant, dramatist, composer, philanthropist

Bardo Corsi (27 May 1566 – 1 March 1624) was an Italian noble, merchant, marquis and one of Florence's patrons of the arts, belonging to the Corsi dynasty. His best-known work is L'Argonautica (1608), work created to commemorate the wedding of Cosimo II de' Medici, Grand Duke of Tuscany and Maria Maddalena of Austria.

In 1617 he bought for 11,700 ducats the fief of Caiazzo of the Kingdom of Naples, being elevated and decorated by the King Philip III of Spain, who granted the title of Marquis to the Family. As he died without heirs in 1624, the title was automatically transferred to the children of Jacopo Corsi, his brother, whom he raised as his own.

== Life ==
Bardo was born on 27 May 1566 in Florence to Giovanni di Jacopo Corsi and the Countess Alessandra Della Gherardesca. As his brothers Giulio and Jacopo, Bardo had a refined education with Luca Bati mainly focused on the merchant and artistic areas.

In 1602, after curating the six children left by his brother Jacopo, all minors, Bardo decided that he would not marry or have other children, dedicating himself exclusively to raising them in memory and in consideration of the love he felt for his brother.

Like his brother Jacopo, he was a man known for his excellent dedication to the arts, but more than that, he was known to be the true master behind the Corsi family fortune. Bardo acted as an important grain merchant in the cities of Messina and Naples, running the family businesses that were already established there, years before, by his late uncle Bardo di Jacopo, of the same name. His success as an entrepreneur led him to immense wealth and this wealth has become a legacy, mainly for the history of Florence, reflected in the purchase of possessions, bonds and large investments.

His best-known feat, without a doubt, was the purchase of the Marquisate Neapolitan of Caiazzo in 1617, which gave the family the finally noble title of Marquises, which they carry for long generations until today. The purchase of the title erected Bardo as the first marquis of the Corsi dynasty at the time, having his confirmation, decoration and coronation personally made and declared by King Philip III of Spain, an indispensable requirement that concluded the concession process nobility in the same year, with the delivery of the writing duly signed by the king. It was from this fact that the Corsi Family, which was already inscribed in the Florentine noble books, also became part of the Neapolitan noble books, which years later, eventually ended up dividing the family again.

Bardo was appointed to be an ambassador for Pope Urban VIII and also for the Kings of England in 1623, but canceled the designations for having been ill at the time, dying the later year in march of 1624.

=== L'Argonautica ===
Years after the first success with Euridice and the excellent marital organization of the wedding of Marie de' Medici and the King Henry IV of France, in 1608 Bardo Corsi was in charge of Medici family to take care of the wedding celebration of Cosimo II de' Medici, Grand Duke of Tuscany and Maria Maddalena of Austria, however, on this occasion, Bardo did not count on the help of his brother Jacopo Corsi and his influence in the artistic environment of Florence, since he had died in 1602.

Among other things, Bardo financed one of the eighteen fantastic ships for L'Argonautica's presentation on the River Arno on 3 November 1608 in Florence. Bardo ordered the ship directly from Giulio Parigi, the official architect of the celebrations, and from Pompeo Caccini, the designs of costumes and equipment for the crew of his boat. According to the description given by Francesco Cini, the Bardo's ship was that of the Anfião, the mythical husband of Niobe who managed, with the magic of the sound of his lyre, to move the stones necessary to build the walls of Thebes.

A host, at the time, was interpreted by the Bardo himself, who, in that capacity, directed the ship. The scene made by Bardo, with all the others from Argonáutica, were depicted in an engraving by Remigio Cantagallina.

Bardo Corsi House of Corsi Born: 27 May 1566 Died: 1 March 1624
Regnal titles
Preceded by Created in 1617 by the Kingdom of Naples, elevated and condecorated by the King Philip III of Spain	Marquis of Caiazzo; 1617–1624	Succeeded by Marquis Giovanni, Second of Caiazzo
