= Camerata de' Bardi =

Camerata de'Bardi may refer to:

- Florentine Camerata, a group of humanists, musicians, poets and intellectuals in late Renaissance Florence, also known as the Camerata de' Bardi
- Camerata de' Bardi (orchestra), an orchestra founded in 1989 at the University of Pavia in Italy
