= Giulia Ammannati =

Mother of Galileo Galilei

- Born: 1 January 1538; Villa Basilica, Italy
- Died: 1 August 1620 (aged 82); Florence, Italy
- Known for: Mother of Galileo Galilei

Giulia Ammannati (1 January 1538, Villa Basilica – 1 August 1620, Florence) was a woman from the Lucca and Livorno area who is best known as the mother of Galileo Galilei. She was a member of a prosperous family. Her ancestor, Jacopo Piccolomini-Ammannati, was the secretary of Pope Pius II.

== Life ==
Giulia Ammannati was born in 1538 in the small village of Villa Basilica. Her father, Cosimo, was a wood merchant of Pescia, who moved to Pisa before 1536. Among the ancestors of the Ammannati family was the secretary of Pope Pius II, Iacopo Ammanati. Ammannati had three sisters, Diamante, Dorotea and Ermellina, and a brother, Leone.

On 5 July 1562, Ammannati married Vincenzio Galilei at Pisa. By this time Ammannati's father already died and her brother Leone was to take charge of the dowry. Ammannati brought a hundred scudi as a dowry, half in cash and the rest in clothes. Additionally, her brother Leoni guaranteed to buy food for a year. One year after they married, the Galilei family rented a house in Via dei Mercanti, where Vincenzio Galilei established a music school which had no financial success. Therefore, Galilei, a musician, was forced to enter the silk and wood trade.

On 15 February 1564, Ammannati gave birth to their first child, Galileo in the Ammannati family house in via Giusti, in the San Francesco district in Pisa where Ammannati's mother Lucrezia and sister Dorotea lived. In 1566 Vincenzio Galileo moved to Florence, leaving Ammannati and Galileo in Pisa. In his absence, a customs officer Muzio Tedaldi looked after the family and sent regular reports to Vincenzio. In 1574, Ammannati and the children rejoined her husband in Florence.

During first ten years of marriage, Ammannati gave birth to four more children: Benedetto (birth date unknown), Virginia in 1573, Anna in 1574 and Michelagnolo in 1575. Benedetto and Anna died prematurely. In 1580, Ammannati gave birth to another daughter, Lena, who also died soon. There were eleven children in the Galilei family.

After the death of Vincenzo Galilei in 1591, the oldest son, Galileo, who already was a professor of mathematics in Pisa, took the burden of sustaining Ammannati and his siblings. Galileo moved to Padua, and Ammannati sent him letters in which she complained of her son's neglect. In 1609 she wrote a letter from Florence to Galileo's domestic servant, Alessandro Piersanti, in which she expressed concern that she had not heard anything from him for several weeks.

The same year, she visited Galileo in Padua and returned to Florence with her granddaughter Virginia, whom she took care of until Galileo's return to Tuscany the following year.

Giulia Ammannati died in August 1620 in Florence and was buried in the Church of Santa Maria del Carmine in Oltrarno.
