= Giovanni Felice Sances =

Italian composer

Giovanni Felice Sances (also Sancies, Sanci, Sanes, Sanchez, c. 1600 – 24 November 1679) was an Italian singer and a Baroque composer. He was renowned in Europe during his time.

Sances studied at the Collegio Germanico in Rome from 1609 to 1614. He appeared in the opera Amor pudico in Rome in 1614. His career then took him to Bologna and Venice. His first opera Ermiona was staged in Padua in 1636, in which he also sang.

In 1636 he moved to Vienna, where he was initially employed at the imperial court chapel as a tenor. In 1649, during the reign of Ferdinand III he was appointed vice-Kapellmeister under Antonio Bertali. He collaborated with Bertali to stage regular performances of Italian opera. He also composed sepolcri, sacred works and chamber music.

In 1669 he succeeded to the post of Imperial Kapellmeister upon Bertali's death. From 1673, due to poor health, many of his duties were undertaken by his deputy Johann Heinrich Schmelzer. He died in Vienna in 1679.

== Works ==
=== Sacred works ===
==== Published motet collections ====
- Motetti a una, due, tre, e quattro voci (1638)
- Motetti a 2, 3, 4, a cinque voci con Litania della BVM (1642) dedicated to Guglielmo Slavata chancellor
- Salmi a 8 voci (1643) dedicated to Archduke Leopold Wilhelm
- Salmi brevi a 4 v. concertate (1647, Cardano) dedicated to Ferdinand IV, King of the Romans
- Antiphonae sacrae una voce decantandae (1648, Cardano) dedicated to Antonio Spindler abbot of the Schottenkirche
- Motetti a quattro voci; Venice, 1658

==== Various works ====
- 60 Mass settings including
  - Missa Sanctae Maria Magdalenae (for 6 wind instruments, 6 string instruments, 7 voices, and organ)
  - Missa Solicita
- Stabat Mater or Il pianto della Madonna (1638)
- O Domine Jesu
- O Deus Meus
- O Maria Dei genitrix
- Caro Mea
- Improperium expectavit cor meum
- Vulnerasti cor meum
- Domine quid multiplicati sunt
- Plagae tuae Domine
- Iste confessor

=== Secular works ===
Six operas, of which three lost

- Opera: L’Ermiona (1636) - lost - libretto by Pio Enea degli Obizzi (1592–1674) on the story of Cadmus and Hermione, performed as an introduction to a tournament.
- Oratorios: Lachrime di San Pietro (1666) La morte de bellata (1669), Sette consolazioni a Maria Vergine per la morte di Cristo (1670), Il trionfo della Croce (1671), Il Paradiso aperto per la morte di Cristo (1672), L' ingiustitia della sentenza di Pilato (1676)

==== Published secular music ====
- Cantatas book I - lost (date unknown)
- Cantatas for one voice (Venice 1633)
- Cantatas for two voices (Venice 1633)
- Il Quarto Libro, cantatas for one voice, with two duets and one for three voices. (Venice 1636)
- Capricci Poetici, 23 works (Venice 1649)
- Trattenimenti musicali per camera, (Venice, 1657), 16 works

==== Various ====
- Mi fai peccato (for 2 voices & basso continuo)
- Si fera s'uccida, (for 2 voices, strings & basso continuo)
- Misera, hor si ch'il pianto
- Chi sa amare e tracer mercede aspetti (canzonetta for 2 voices)
- Presso l'onde tranquille (for voice & basso continuo)
- Traditorella che credi (for voice & basso continuo)
- Perché Vechia gli dissi (for voice & basso continuo)
- Che sperasti ò mio cor (for voice & basso continuo)
- Cantata: Lagrimosa beltà (ciaccona) (for 2 voices)
- Cantata: Non sia chi mi riprende (1636)
- Dialogo a due. Pastor e Ninfa (1649)
- Pianto della Madonna cantata per alto e organo

== Recordings ==
- Tirsi Morir Volea, Sacro & Profano, Marco Mencoboni E lucevan le stelle records
- Dulcis amor Iesu. Scherzi Musicali with Nicolas Achten, conductor. 2010, Ricercar RIC 292
- Stabat Mater & Motets to the virgin Mary - Philippe Jaroussky - Warner Classics - Aout 2009
