= Lucia Quinciani =

Italian composer (fl. 1611)

Lucia Quinciani (c. 1566, fl. 1611) was an Italian composer.

== Life and music ==
She is the earliest known published female composer of monody. She is known only by one composition, a setting of "Udite lagrimosi spirti d’Averno, udite", from Giovanni Battista Guarini's Il pastor fido, found in Marcantonio Negri's Affetti amorosi second volume (1611), in which Negri refers to Quinciani as his student. She may have worked in Venice or Verona.
