= Piero Strozzi (composer) =

Italian nobleman and composer

Piero (or Pietro) Strozzi (1550 - after 1 September 1609) was an Italian nobleman and amateur composer.

A member of the powerful Strozzi family, Piero was born and died in Florence, where he played an important intellectual role in fostering the "new music" during the late 16th century. He was a member of the Camerata of Count Giovanni de' Bardi and a member of the Camerata of Jacopo Corsi. He was supportive of Giulio Caccini and commissioned several works by the composer. Among his compositions are several madrigals and one opera, La mascherata degli accecati (1596).

== Sources ==
- Edmond Strainchamps. The New Grove Dictionary of Opera, edited by Stanley Sadie (1992), ISBN 0-333-73432-7 and ISBN 1-56159-228-5
