= Marcantonio Negri =

Italian composer

Marcantonio Negri (died October 1624) was an Italian composer, singer, and musical director of the early Baroque era. He was part of the musical establishment of St. Mark's Basilica in Venice during the same period as Monteverdi and was well known as a composer at the time.

== Life ==
He was born in Verona, but little is known about his life before his appointment as assistant maestro di cappella at St. Mark's on 22 December 1612. In this role, he supported Monteverdi, who was the primary maestro di cappella. His first publication, dating from 1608 in Venice, indicates that he had some experience as a composer and singer prior to his arrival at St. Mark's; however, it is unclear whether he gained this experience in Verona, Venice, or elsewhere. After four years at St. Mark's, Nehru became abbot of a monastery at Veglia (now Krk, Croatia), an island off the coast of Dalmatia. Despite this new position, he remained partially involved with St. Mark's on a part-time basis. He resigned from St. Mark's in 1619, and his position was filled by Alessandro Grandi. Negri died at Veglia.

== Music and influence ==
Negri’s first book of affetti amorosi (1608) showcases the most modern canzonetta style, featuring expressive chromaticism and continuo. In 1611, he published a second book of affetti amorosi, which includes sonatas for two violins and continuo, as well as some sinfonias. Some of these compositions incorporate "battle music", with violins imitating trumpet calls and military drums. Both Monteverdi and Grandi later adopted this style, and Monteverdi may have learned it from Negri.

Negri also published sacred music, including a book of psalm settings (1613) and a collection of spiritual songs (1618), both released in Venice. Stylistically, these works align with the typical practice at St. Mark's of using divided choirs and groups of instruments, characteristic of the Venetian polychoral style and the stile concertato.
