= Giovanni Corsi =

Italian composer

- Second Marquis of Caiazzo
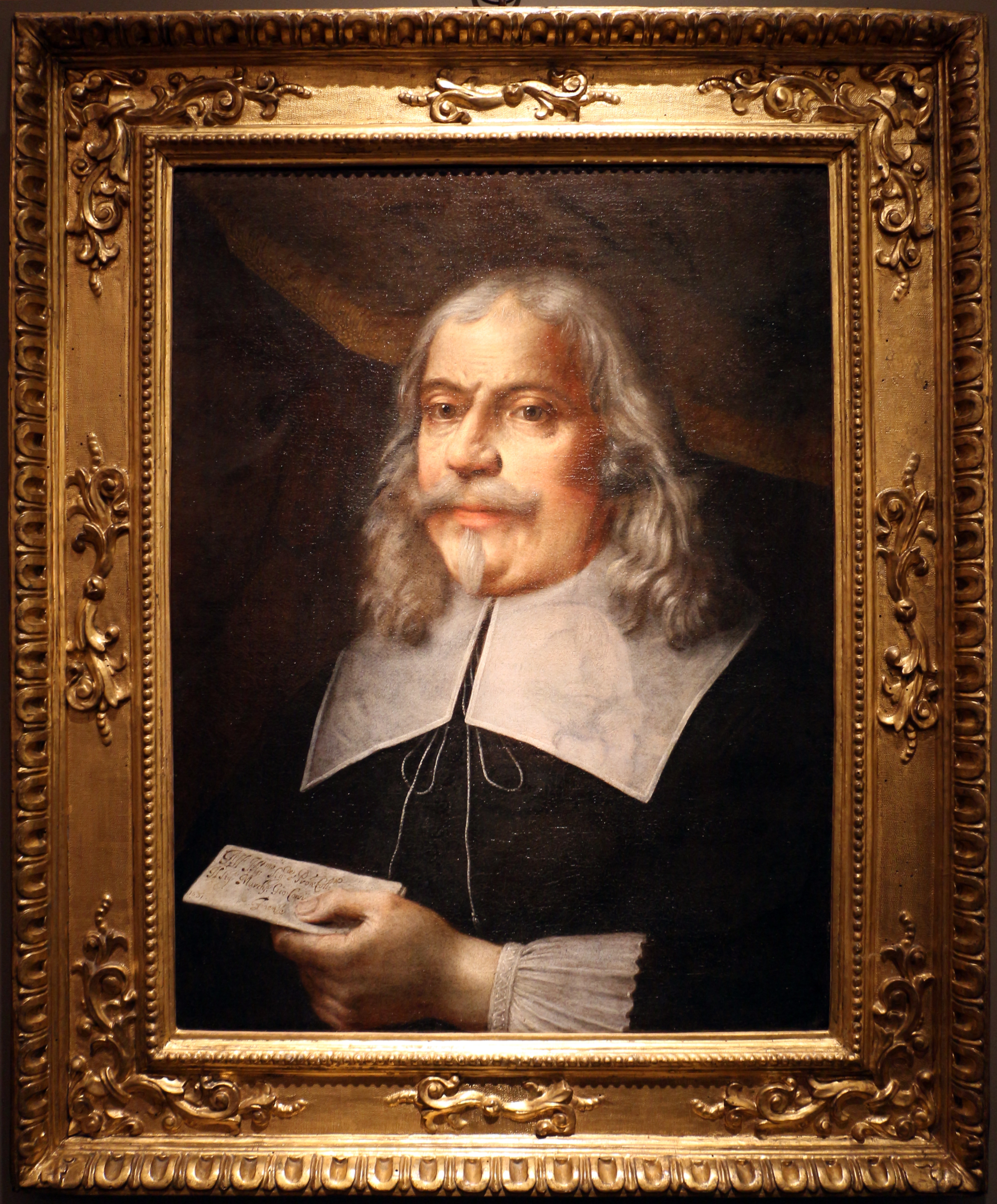
- Giovanni Corsi by Mario Balassi
- Born: 5 February 1600; Florence, Italy
- Died: 11 March 1661 (aged 61); Florence, Italy
- Spouses: Patrizia di Firenze Lucrezia Salviati; Maria Virginia Vitelli
- Issue: Count Antonio Corsi of Montepescali (b. 1625); Cardinal Domenico Maria Corsi (b. 1633); Laura Corsi (b. 1642)
- House: Corsi
- Father: Jacopo Corsi
- Mother: Laura Corsini
- Occupation: Knight; patron; ambassador; senator; marquis

Giovanni Corsi (5 February 1600 – 11 March 1661) was an Italian marquis, knight, patron, ambassador and senator of Florence in 1637. He was the second Marquis of Caiazzo, title he inherited after Bardo Corsi death in 1624.

== Life ==
Giovanni was born on 5 February 1600 in Florence to Jacopo Corsi and Laura Corsini. When his father died in 1602 he was adopted by his uncle Bardo Corsi, who raised him as a son, as well as all his brothers and sisters. Both his father Jacopo and his uncle Bardo were important figures in Florentine cultural life at the end of the 16th century, and Bardo provided Giovanni an excellent and sophisticated education, at the height of the wealth of the Corsi dynasty.

He studied at the Accademia Militare di Parma, where he learned about the Code of Chivalry and became a Knight.

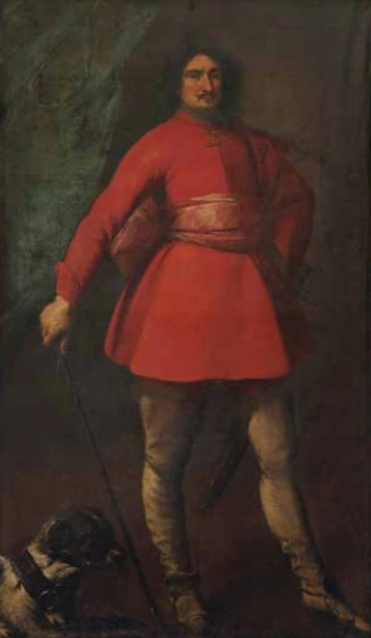
Giovanni Corsi in 1628 by Valore and Domenico Casini.

In 1624 he inherited from his uncle Bardo Corsi the title of Marquis of Caiazzo (Marchese di Cajazzo) and his possessions, including the Tornabuoni Palace and Villa Corsi, since he died without biological heirs.

Around 1628, when he was still young, he ordered a painting from the Casini brothers. In it Giovanni is portrayed in all his youthful pride, dressed in a sumptuous elegant Turkish-style costume next to a dog, probably a dog that belonged to the family.

He married Lucrezia Salviati in 1628 and from this first relationship the Count Antonio Corsi (b. 1625) and Cardinal Domenico Maria Corsi (b. 1633) were born. Later, after his widowhood, he married Virginia Vitelli in 1640, having Laura Corsi (b. 1642) by this marriage.

Giovanni was one of the ambassadors of the Medici Dynasty in Milan, being one of the most illustrious and influential representatives of the Corsi dynasty in that sense. In 1634, Giovanni was sent by Ferdinando II de' Medici, Grand Duke of Tuscany as ambassador to Milan to honor the new governor.

Three years later, in 1637, he was elected senator of Florence.

In 1645 he was part of the procession of Giovan Carlo de' Medici in Rome, shortly after his appointment as cardinal and in 1655 he was entrusted with another important role as ambassador and main speaker in Rome for Pope Alexander VII. It was on that occasion, in 1655, that Giovanni suffered an apoplectic attack (stroke), which left him incapacitated until his death in 1661.

After his death, a chapel was erected in his honor by his daughter Laura, who had married the Marquis of Bontieri and Boccheggiano Giovanni Vincenzo Salviati.

Giovanni Corsi House of Corsi Born: 5 February 1600 Died: 11 March 1661
Regnal titles
| Preceded by Marquis Bardo, First of Caiazzo | Marquis of Caiazzo; 1624–1661 | Succeeded by Count Antonio Corsi of Montepescali |
