= Domenico Maria Corsi =

Italian Catholic cardinal

- Cardinal, Bishop of Rimini
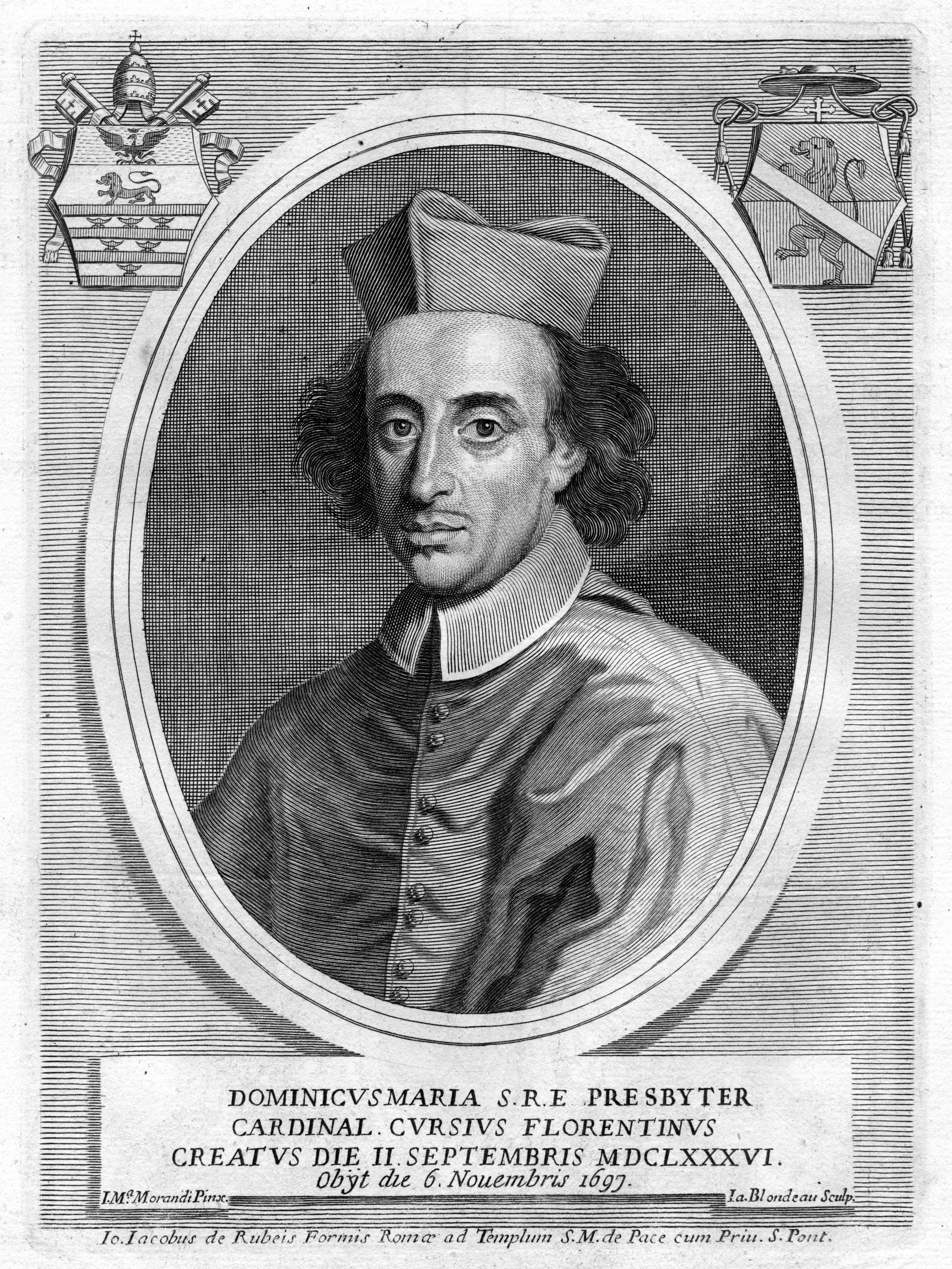
- Church: Catholic Church
- See: Rimini
- Appointed: 7 July 1687
- Term ended: 6 November 1697
- Predecessor: Cardinal Marco Galli
- Successor: Cardinal Gianantonio Davia
- Other post: Cardinal Priest of San Pietro in Montorio

Orders
- Consecration: 17 Aug 1687 (Bishop) by Gianfrancesco Riccamonti
- Created cardinal: 2 September 1686 by Pope Innocent XI

Personal details
- Born: 1633 Florence
- Died: 6 November 1697 (aged 63–64) Rimini
- Buried: Cathedral of Santa Colomba, Rimini

Domenico Maria Corsi (1633 – 6 November 1697) was a Catholic cardinal who served as Bishop of Rimini from 1687 to his death, and as Legate (i.e. Governor) of Romagna from 1687 to 1693.

== Life ==
Domenico Maria Corsi was born in Florence in 1633 (Note: According to an other source he lived 63 years, 6 months and 18 days, so he was born on 18 April 1634) to an important Florentine family: his father, Giovanni of Jacopo marquis of Caiazzo, was senator and ambassador of Florence to the Duchy of Milan, and his mother was the marchioness Lucrezia Salviati. Domenico Maria studied with support from his uncle Lorenzo Corsi. (Note: Lorenzo Corsi was born in 1601 in Florence. Vice-legate of Avignon from 1645 to 1653, he died in Rome on 3 July 1656 of plague.) He graduated in utroque iure in Pisa. On 12 April 1657, he joined the Accademia della Crusca, entering the Academy of Florence (former Accademia degli Apatisti) in 1659.

After the death of his uncle, he took up a career in the administration of the Papal States: in 1662, he was made Referendary of the Tribunals of the Apostolic Signature of Justice and of Grace, on 7 March 1664, he was appointed Protonotary apostolic. He was appointed Vice-legato of Ferrara in 1666, Vice-governor of Fermo in 1668, Vice-legato of Urbino in 1673.

In 1675, he purchased the title of clerk of the Apostolic Camera, and on 16 September 1681, he became Auditor Camerae. In Rome he took the offices of General Commissioner of Army, Responsable of the mint and prefect of the Annona with the responsibility for the grain supply to the city of Rome, engaging in these offices with great energy and strong character. He was also the governor of 1676 papal conclave that elected Pope Innocent XI.

On 2 September 1686, Pope Innocent XI appointed him Cardinal deacon with the title of Sant'Eustachio. On 3 March 1687, he was appointed Legate (i.e. Governor) of Romagna. He entered in Ravenna, the capital of Romagna, on 14 June 1687. This office was confirmed on 27 October 1689 for other three years.

On 7 July 1687, he was appointed bishop of the nearby town of Rimini. His episcopal consecration followed on 17 August in the Cathedral of Santa Colomba in Rimini at the hands of the bishops of Cervia, Bertinoro and Montefeltro.

Corsi was a patron for some contemporary artists, such as Mario Balassi and Alessandro Rondoni the Younger. As Legate of Romagna he restored in 1692 the Tomb of Dante. As bishop of Rimini, he visited the diocese in 1687, he erected along with the town council an hospital and the seminary, in 1692, he built a chapel dedicated to S. Maria del Rifugio aside the old cathedral, and in 1696 he held a diocesan synod.

On 3 December 1696, he was promoted to Cardinal priest with the title of San Pietro in Montorio. He was Camerlengo of the Sacred College of Cardinals from 14 January 1697 until his death. He died in Rimini on 6 November 1697, and he was buried in the cathedral of that town.
