= Giovanni de' Bardi =

Italian literary critic, writer, composer and soldier

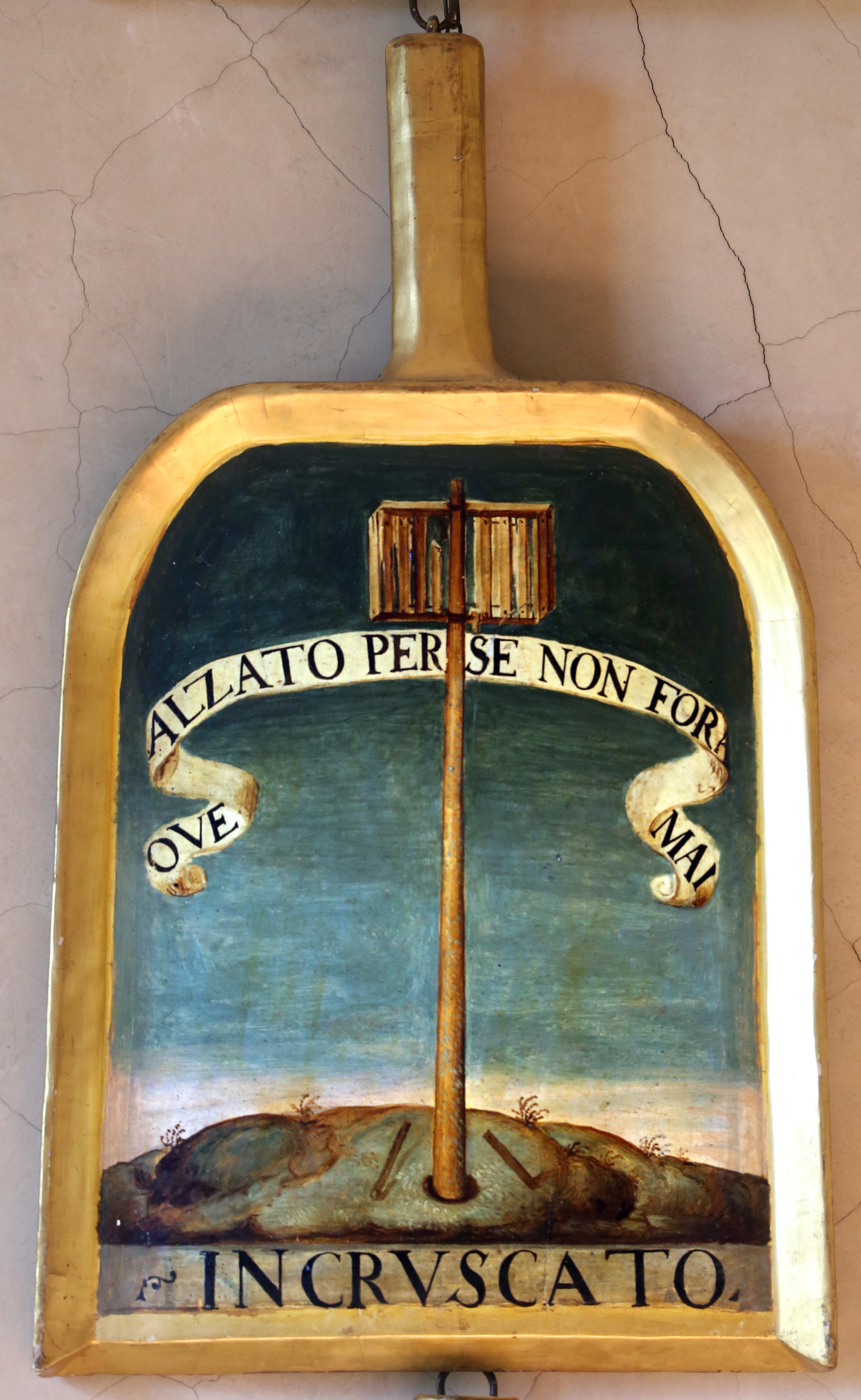
Shovel of Giovanni de' Bardi (Incruscato) at Accademia della Crusca

Giovanni de' Bardi (5 February 1534 – September 1612), Count of Vernio, was an Italian literary critic, writer, composer and soldier.

== Biography ==
Giovanni de' Bardi was born in Florence.

While he received a deep classical education, becoming proficient in Latin and Greek as well as learning the craft of music composition, his early years were largely spent as a soldier. Under Grand Duke Cosimo I of Tuscany he fought against Siena, and later he fought at the Siege of Malta (1565) against the Turks. After Malta, and now a captain, he assisted Maximilian II in defeating the Turks in Hungary. But when he was not away on military campaigns, he was busy in Florence and elsewhere as a patron of music and the arts.

Bardi is mainly famous for being host, patron, and inspiration to the group of composers, music theorists and scholars who made up the Florentine Camerata, the group which attempted to restore the aesthetic effect of ancient Greek music to contemporary practice. The group included Vincenzo Galilei (father of the astronomer Galileo), Giulio Caccini, and Pietro Strozzi, and derived its inspiration from a correspondence with Girolamo Mei, the foremost scholar of ancient Greek drama and music at the time. The result of the association was the invention of monody, and shortly thereafter, opera; in addition, the innovations brought to music by the Camerata under the guidance of Bardi were one of the defining characteristics of what we now know as Baroque music.

Although he was also a composer, relatively few of his works survive: only a handful of madrigals. Curiously, he seems not to have tried his hand at the new monody himself. He also either organized or wrote parts for various intermedi in Florence, the popular court entertainments which took place between the acts of spoken dramas (and which included acting, singing, dancing, and mime — thus being another important precursor to opera). He also wrote plays, including some of the plays for which he also provided the intermedi.

Vincenzo Galilei thought highly of Bardi, and dedicated his famous Dialogo della musica antica et della moderna to him. In the Dialogo, Galilei condemns polyphony, praises monody, and expresses the wish that the musical practice of the ancient Greeks would be restored; corrupt and incomprehensible contemporary music would be replaced with an idealized version of the supposed music of the ancient time. The Counter-Reformation Council of Trent had just finished condemning polyphonic practice, for the same supposed fault (it was too hard to understand the sung text), but for spiritual rather than secular reasons.

== Works ==
Discorso sopra 'l giuoco del calcio Fiorentino (1580)

== References and further reading ==
- "Camerata", "Giovanni de Bardi" in The New Grove Dictionary of Music and Musicians, ed. Stanley Sadie. 20 vol. London, Macmillan Publishers Ltd., 1980. ISBN 1-56159-174-2
- Gustave Reese, Music in the Renaissance. New York, W.W. Norton & Co., 1954. ISBN 0-393-09530-4
- Clair, Colin. A Chronology of Printing. Great Britain: Frederick A. Praeger., 1969., p. 64
