= Villa Basilica =

- Comune
- Comune di Villa Basilica
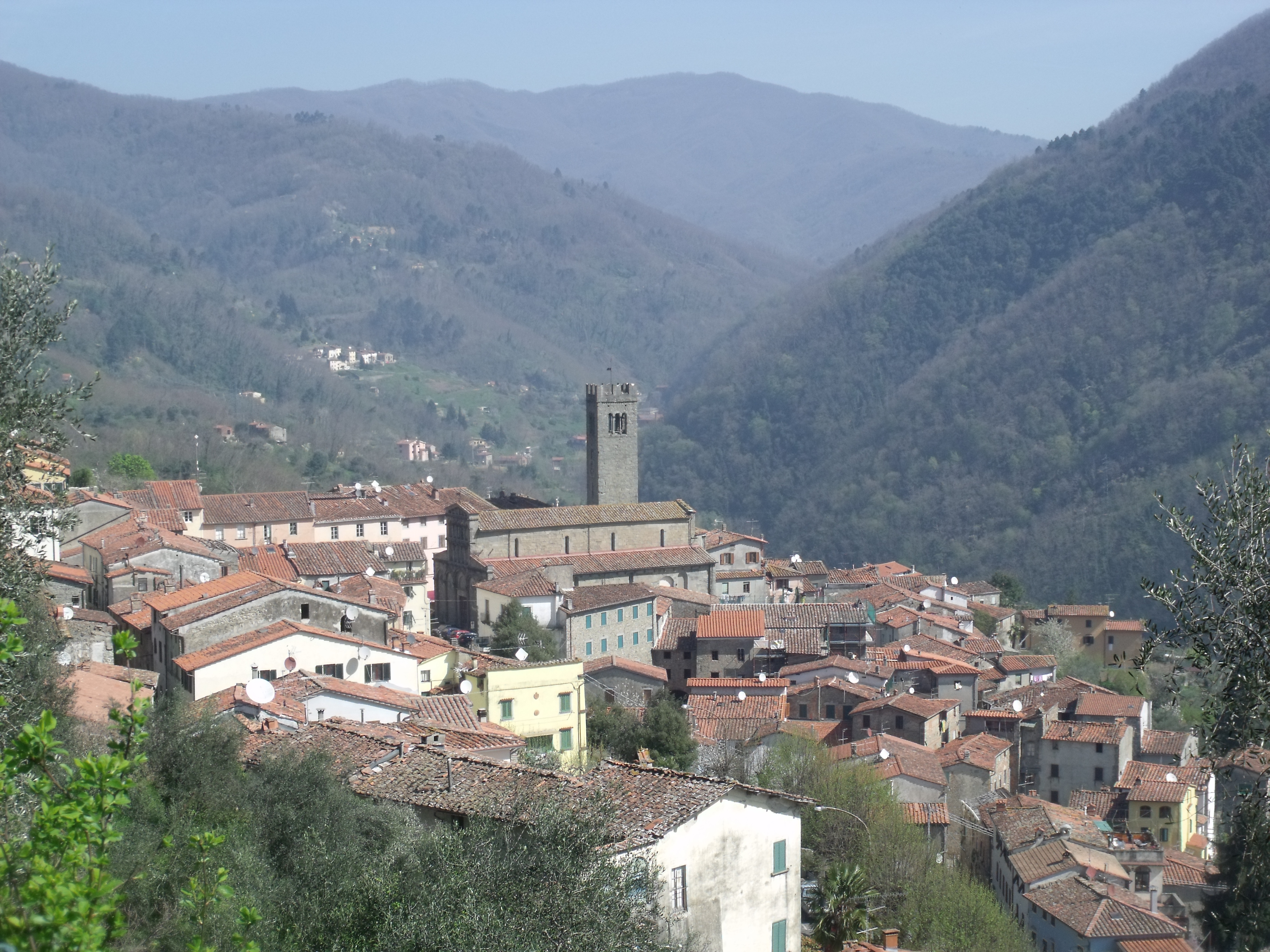
- Panorama of Villa Basilica

- Coat of arms

- Location within Italy Location within Tuscany
- Coordinates: 43°55′N 10°39′E
- Country: Italy
- Region: Tuscany
- Province: Lucca (LU)
- Frazioni: Barbagliana, Biecina, Botticino, Boveglio, Capornano, Colognora, Distendino, Duomo, Guzzano, Pariana, Pracando, Ponte a Villa, Pontoro

Government
  - Mayor: Giordano Ballini

Area
  - Total: 36.57 km^{2} (14.12 sq mi)
- Elevation: 330 m (1,080 ft)

Population (31 March 2017)
  - Total: 1,596
  - Density: 43.64/km^{2} (113.0/sq mi)
- Demonym: Villesi
- Time zone: UTC+1 (CET)
  - Summer (DST): UTC+2 (CEST)
- Postal code: 55019
- Dialing code: 0572
- Website: Official website

Villa Basilica is a comune (municipality) in the Province of Lucca in the Italian region Tuscany, located about 50 kilometres (31 mi) northwest of Florence and about 13 kilometres (8 mi) northeast of Lucca.

Villa Basilica borders the following municipalities: Bagni di Lucca, Borgo a Mozzano, Capannori, Pescia. Remarkable the main church, the pieve of Santa Maria Assunta

== Notable people ==
- Giulia Ammannati, mother of Galileo Galilei
- Sisto Fabri (1540–1594), theologian
- Antonio Franchi, Italian painter of the 17th century
- Pietro Perna (1519–1582), printer and humanist
