= Santa Maria Assunta, Villa Basilica =

Church in Tuscany, Italy

Coordinates: 43.9276°N 10.6451°E

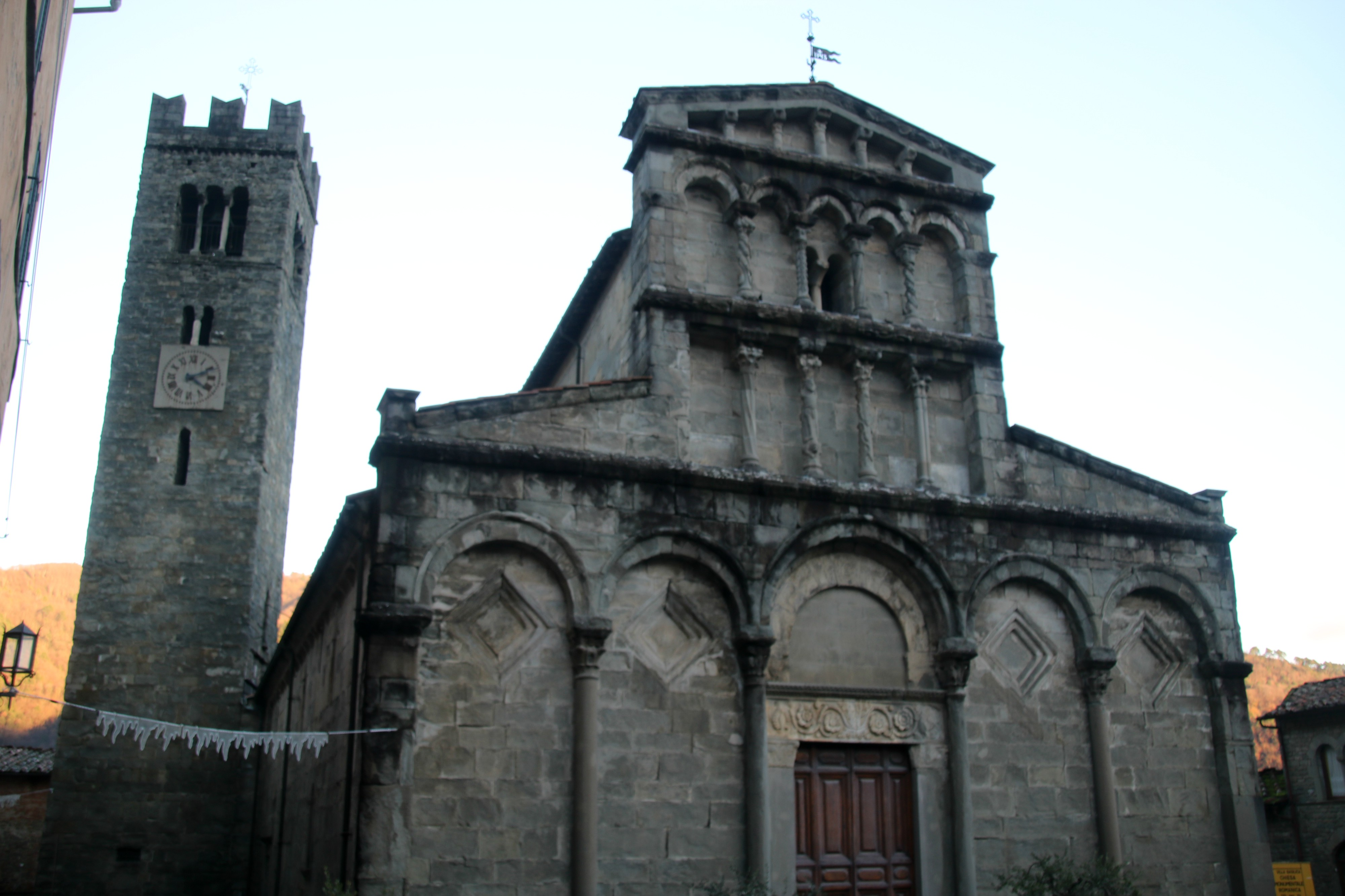

Santa Maria Assunta is a Romanesque-style, Roman Catholic parish church and Pieve in the town of Villa Basilica in the Province of Lucca, region of Tuscany, Italy.

== History ==
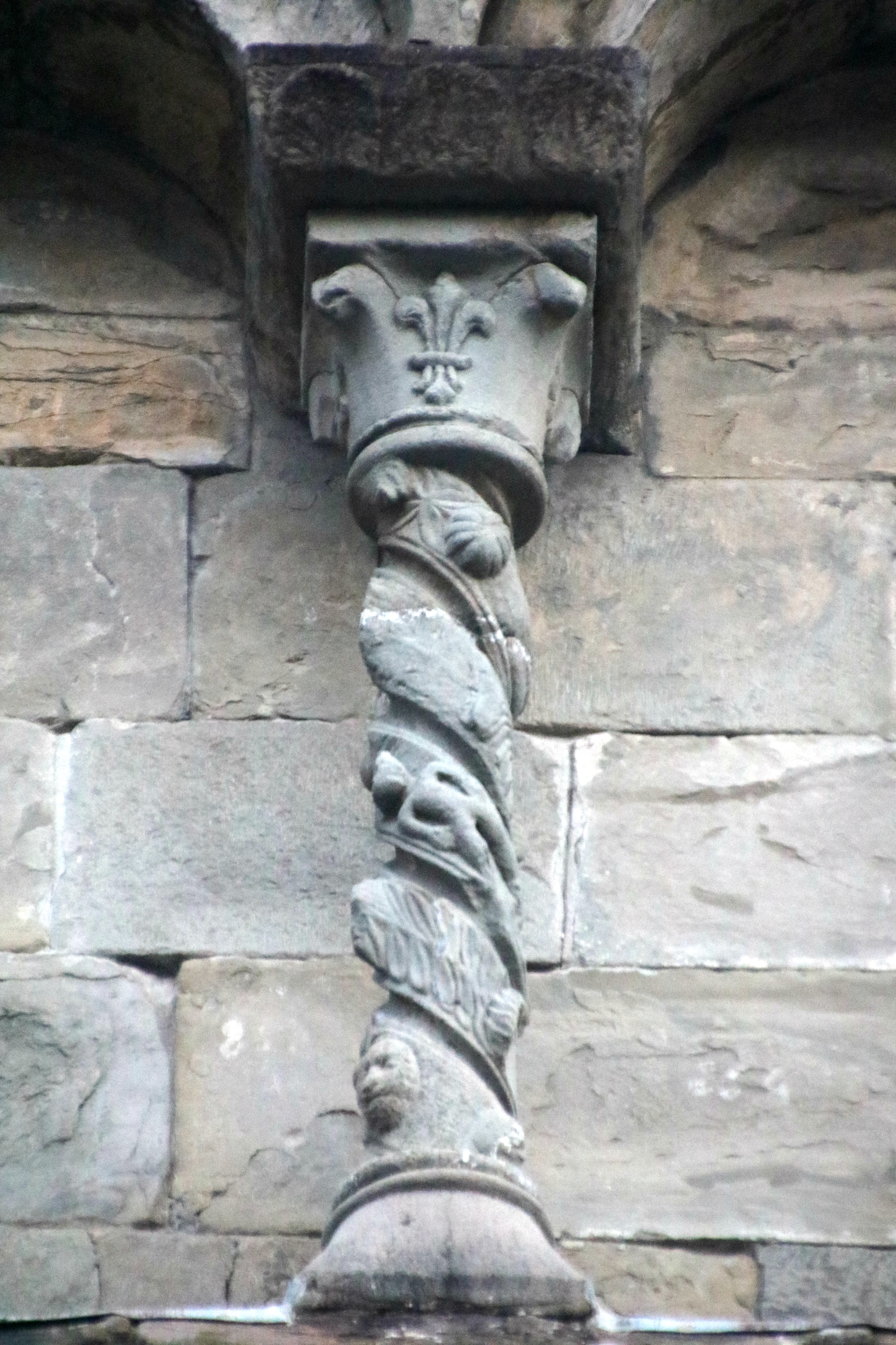

A church at the site is documented since 807, but the present three nave church dates mainly to the 12th century. It is notable for columns with capitals decorated with animals and flowers. The church houses a 13th-century crucifix by Berlinghiero Berlinghieri.

An 1896 survey notes an altar dedicated to the Madonna of the Rosary was decorated by Antonio Franchi; while the altarpiece depicting the Madonna del Carmelo consoling the souls in Purgatory by attributed to either followers of Carracci or Giovanni Marracci. The apse was frescoed by Pietro Scorzini, while the altarpiece depicting St Bernard providing the Rule of his Order was painted by Giovanni Coli.
