= Florentine Camerata =

Group of humanists

The Florentine Camerata (Italian: Camerata Fiorentina), also known as the Camerata de' Bardi, were a group of humanists, musicians, poets and intellectuals in late Renaissance Florence who gathered under the patronage of Count Giovanni de' Bardi to discuss and guide trends in the arts, especially music and drama. They met at the house of Giovanni de' Bardi, and their gatherings had the reputation of having all the most famous men of Florence as frequent guests. After first meeting in 1573, the activity of the Camerata reached its height between 1577 and 1582. While propounding a revival of the Greek dramatic style, the Camerata's musical experiments led to the development of the stile recitativo. In this way it facilitated the composition of dramatic music and the development of opera.

== Membership ==
The term camerata is entirely a new construct coined by the members of Bardi's circle, although apparently based on the Italian word for "chamber", camera, a term used for a room where important meetings were held. The name for Bardi's group comes from Giulio Caccini's score for Euridice, wherein he dedicates the work to Count Bardi, remembering the "Camerata's good years." The earliest recorded meeting was 14 January 1573 at Count Giovanni Bardi's house. Known members of the group besides Bardi included Giulio Caccini, Pietro Strozzi, and Vincenzo Galilei (the father of the astronomer Galileo Galilei). Girolamo Mei also participated, and at a young age, Ottavio Rinuccini (1562-1621), likely the first opera librettist, may have also participated. Less prominent members of the Camerata may have included the musicians Emilio de' Cavalieri, Francesco Cini, Cristoforo Malvezzi, and Alessandro Striggio. Literary figures included Giovanni Battista Guarini, Gabriello Chiabrera, and Giovanni Battista Strozzi the younger. The social circle of Jacopo Corsi should not be confused with the Camerata of Bardi. Though they included many of the same luminaries, the rivalry between Corsi and Bardi was fierce and constant.

Unifying the Camerata members was the belief that music had become corrupt, and by returning to the forms and style of the ancient Greeks, the art of music could be improved, and thereby society could be improved as well. Though they did not originate many of their conclusions about music, the Camerata of Bardi solidified the ideas gleaned from outside thinkers like Girolamo Mei.

== Foundation ==
Prior to the Camerata's inception, there existed a popular sentiment among the Camerata's Renaissance contemporaries that music should mimic the ancient roots of the Greeks. The current day's thought held that the Greeks used a style between speech and song, and this belief guided the Camerata's discourse. They were influenced by Girolamo Mei, the foremost scholar of ancient Greece at the time, who held—among other things—that ancient Greek drama was predominantly sung rather than spoken. Foundational for this belief was the writing of the Greek thinker Aristoxenus, who proposed that speech should set the pattern for song.

Largely concerned with a revival of the Greek dramatic style, the Camerata's musical experiments led to the development of the stile recitativo. Cavalieri was the first to employ the new recitative style, trying his creative hand at a few pastoral scenes. The style later became primarily linked with the development of opera.

The criticism of contemporary music by the Camerata centered on the overuse of polyphony at the expense of the sung text's intelligibility. Excessive counterpoint offended so the ears of the Camerata because it muddled the affetto ("affection") of the important visceral reaction in poetry. It is the job of the composer to communicate the affetto into an audible, comprehensible sound. Intrigued by ancient descriptions of the emotional and moral effect of ancient Greek tragedy and comedy, which they presumed to be sung as a single line to a simple instrumental accompaniment, the Camerata proposed creating a new kind of music. Instead of trying to make the clearest polyphony they could, the Camerata voiced an opinion recorded by a contemporary Florentine, "means must be found in the attempt to bring music closer to that of classical times."

== Composition ==
In his formative days, Vincenzo Galilei was trained in music theory by the famed Gioseffo Zarlino. In 1582 Vincenzo Galilei performed a setting, that he composed himself, of Ugolino's lament from Dante's Inferno. Caccini also is known to have performed several of his own songs which were more or less chanted melodically over a simple chordal accompaniment. The Camerata composers sought to recreate the style of Greek music, even though actual transcribed Greek music had been lost for centuries.

The musical style which developed from these early experiments was called monody. In the 1590s, the monody developed into a vehicle capable of extended dramatic expression through the work of composers such as Jacopo Peri, working in conjunction with poet Ottavio Rinuccini. In 1598, Peri and Rinuccini produced Dafne, an entire drama sung in monodic style: this was the first creation of a new form called "opera". Though Peri's Dafne was the first performed opera, its music has been lost to the centuries. Instead, Euridice, his second opera is most-often heralded as the history-making work. The new form of opera also borrowed, especially for the librettos, from an existing pastoral poetic form called intermedio; it was mainly the musical style that was new. The instrumentation for an opera from the Camerata composers (Caccini and Peri) was written for a handful of gambas, lutes, and harpsichord or organ for continuo.

Other composers quickly began to incorporate the ideas of the Camerata into their music, and by the first decade of the seventeenth century the new "music drama" was being widely composed, performed and disseminated. Instead of an immediate decline in contrapuntal vocal music, there was a time of coexistence and then an eventual synthesis of monody and polyphony. Florence, Rome, and Venice became the Italian capitals of innovation and synthesis.

The Camerata's view on counterpoint and monody did not rise to prominence without opposition. Galilei's famed theory teacher Zarlino countered, "What has the musician to do with those who recite tragedies and comedies?"

In the compositions of the Camerata members, the theory preceded the practice; the men decided how the music should sound before they set to compose it. The composers of the Camerata became so faithfully committed to the exploration of their declamatory style that often their pieces became rife with monotone sonorities.

Eventually the influence of the Bardi circle waned as Giovanni Bardi fell out of favor. Bardi publicly endorsed the marriage of Francesco I de' Medici and his mistress Bianca Cappello. This endorsement was in stark contrast to the feelings of Francesco's brother Ferdinando I de' Medici, who was a cardinal in Rome at that time.

== Legacy ==
Bardi, Galilei, and Caccini left writings expounding their ideas. Bardi wrote the Discorso (1578), a long letter to Giulio Caccini, and Galilei published the Dialogo della musica antica et della moderna (1581–1582). In 1602, long after the group had disbanded, Caccini wrote "Le nuove musiche".

The members of Bardi's circle may not have recognized the full importance of their labors, as no one named the group until Caccini's label in 1600. Galilei once marked that Bardi aided noblemen in the study of music. Yet, through the critical efforts of men like Galilei, the Camerata gained an indirect influence on the flow of music history, as Galilei challenged artists to rethink the palette of sound they had been utilizing for decades. The greatest innovation to emerge from the Camerata was not a piece of music or aesthetic ideal, but rather a door opened for further composition of dramatic music.
