= Vincenzo Galilei =

Italian musician and music theorist (1520–1591)

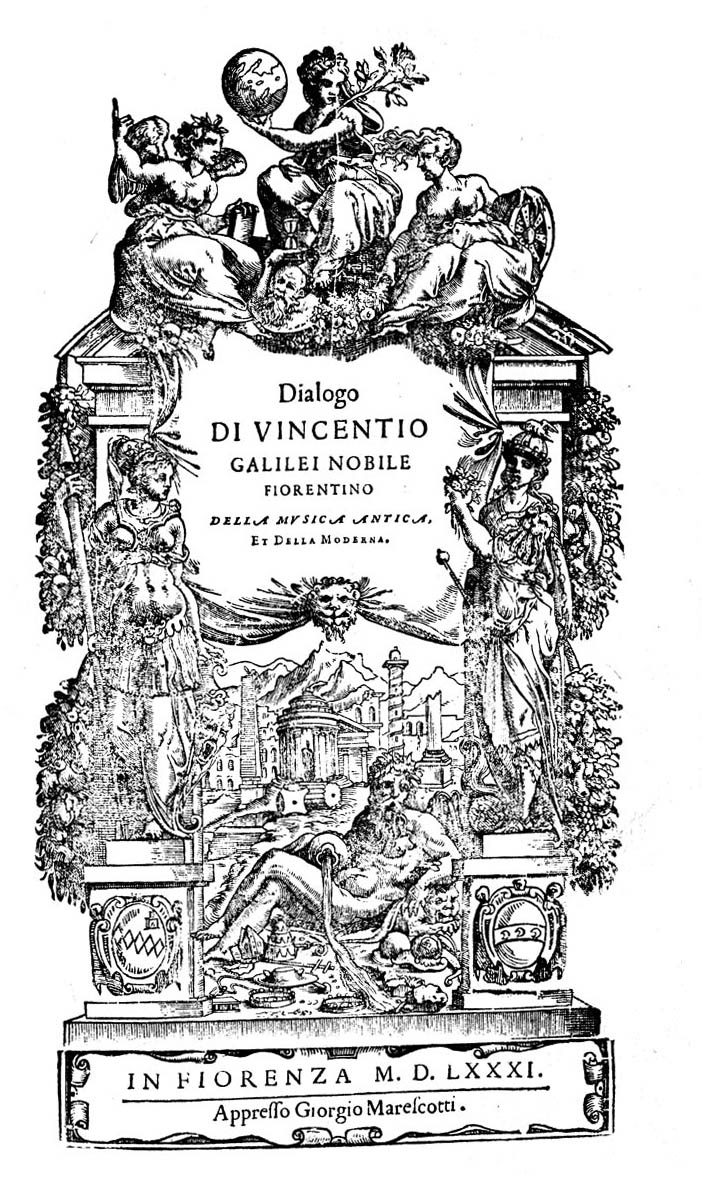
Della musica antica et della moderna, 1581

Vincenzo Galilei (3 April 1520 – 2 July 1591) was an Italian lutenist, composer, and music theorist. His children included the astronomer and physicist Galileo Galilei and the lute virtuoso and composer Michelagnolo Galilei. Vincenzo was a figure in the musical life of the late Renaissance and contributed significantly to the musical revolution that demarcates the beginning of the Baroque era.

In his study of pitch and string tension, Galilei produced perhaps the first non-linear mathematical description of a natural phenomenon known to history. Some credit him with directing the activity of his son away from pure, abstract mathematics and towards experimentation using mathematical quantitative description of the results, a direction of importance for the history of physics and natural science. With fellows of the Florentine Camerata, he laid the foundations for opera.

== Biography ==
He was born in an ancient noble family in 1520 in Santa Maria a Monte, near Pisa, Republic of Florence, and began studying the lute at an early age. His mother was from San Vincenzo near Livorno. Sometime before 1562 he moved to Pisa, where on 5 July he married Giulia Ammannati of a noble family. Galileo Galilei was the oldest of six or seven children; another son, Michelagnolo, born in 1575, became an accomplished lutenist and composer.

Galilei was a skilled player of the lute who early in life attracted the attention of powerful patrons. In 1563, he met Gioseffo Zarlino, the most important music theorist of the sixteenth century, in Venice, and began studying with him. Somewhat later he became interested in the attempts to revive ancient Greek music and drama, by way of his association with the Florentine Camerata, a group of poets, musicians and intellectuals led by Count Giovanni de' Bardi, as well as his contacts with Girolamo Mei, the foremost scholar of the time of ancient Greek music. Galilei composed two books of madrigals, as well as music for lute, and a considerable quantity of music for voice and lute; this latter category is considered to be his most important contribution as it anticipated in many ways the style of the early Baroque.

The use of recitative in opera is widely attributed to Galilei, since he was one of the inventors of monody, the musical style closest to recitative.

Galilei died on 2 July 1591.

== Acoustics and music theory ==
Galilei promoted equal temperament. In his exploration of tuning and keys, he composed 24 groups of dances, "clearly related to 12 major and 12 minor keys" (1584).

Some of Galilei's most important theoretical contributions involve the treatment of dissonance: he had a largely modern conception, allowing passing dissonance "if the voices flow smoothly" as well as on-the-beat dissonance, such as suspensions, which he called "essential dissonance". This describes Baroque practice, especially as he defines rules for resolution of suspensions by a preliminary leap away from, followed by a return to, the expected note of resolution.

Vincenzo Galilei was one of the pioneers in the systematic study of acoustics, mainly in his research (assisted by his son Galileo) in the mathematical formula of stretched strings. Galileo told his biographer that Vincenzo introduced him to the idea of systematic testing and measurement through their Pisa house basement, which was strung with lengths of lute string materials, each of different lengths, with different weights attached.

Galilei made discoveries in acoustics, particularly involving the physics of vibrating strings and columns of air. He discovered that while the ratio of an interval is proportional to string lengths—for example, a perfect fifth has the proportions of 3:2—it varied with the square root of the tension applied (and the cube root of concave volumes of air). Weights suspended from strings of equal length need to be in a ratio of 9:4 to produce the 3:2 perfect fifth.

This work was taken further by Marin Mersenne, who formulated the current law of vibrating strings. Mersenne was only three years old when Vincenzo died, but he would later maintain a regular link to Galileo (and many other scientists). He treated Galileo as a prized member of his scientific network. He communicated Galileo's ideas for a pendulum clock to Christiaan Huygens (who improved on it).

Despite being a priest, Mersenne defended Galileo when he came under attack by the church in 1633, but he also questioned Galileo's claims and disputed the accuracy of some of Galileo's findings. He conducted his own duplicate experiments, which improved on their accuracy.

== Sources ==
- Palisca, Claude. "Vincenzo Galilei", Grove Music Online, ed. L. Macy (Accessed 7 March 2007), (subscription access)
- Reese, Gustave, Music in the Renaissance. New York, W.W. Norton & Co., 1954. ISBN 0-393-09530-4
- Sadie, Stanley, ed. Vincenzo Galilei, The New Grove Dictionary of Music and Musicians, 20 vol. London, Macmillan Publishers Ltd., 1980. ISBN 1-56159-174-2 [Retrieved 2004-05-27]
- Slonimsky, Nicolas, ed. The Concise Edition of Baker's Biographical Dictionary of Musicians, 8th ed. New York, Schirmer Books, 1993. ISBN 0-02-872416-X [Retrieved 2004-05-27]
- Fix, Adam. "Esperienza, Teacher of All Things: Vincenzo Galilei's Music as Artisanal Epistemology," Nuncius 34, no. 3 (2019): 535–74.
- Carmelo Imbesi, Carmen Zangarà, Contrapunti and other works – for Guitar Duo, Num Cat. DV22145, ISMN 979-0-2162-1178-9, Da Vinci Edition, 2023
- Fabbri, Natacha. L'ascesa di Vincenzo Galilei nel parnaso degli uomini illustri, in Festschrift per Ferdinando Abbri, ed. by S. Brogi, A. La Vergata, M. Segala, Pisa, ETS, 2021, pp. 153-156.
- Fabbri, Natacha. Homage to Vincenzo Galilei, «Galilaeana», XVIII, 2021, pp. 181-189.
- Fabbri Natacha, Nel nome del figlio. Bonaventura e la riscoperta di Vincenzo Galilei tra musica e scienza, in Arnaldo Bonaventura (1862-1952), ed. by R. Becheri and P. Gibbin, Florence, Conservatorio Cherubini, 2024, pp. 151-160.
- Fabbri Natacha and Ferdinando Abbri (ed. by). Vincenzo Galilei. The Renaissance Dialogue between Music and Science, Florence, Olschki, 2025, ISBN 978-88-222-6990-4
- Fabbri, Natacha. Galilei: The Sound of Science. Research Booklet, Florence, Ema Vinci Classica, 2026, DOI: 10.5281/zenodo.19533384
