= Michelagnolo Galilei =

Italian lutenist and composer (1575–1631)

Michelagnolo Galilei (sometimes spelled Michelangelo; 18 December 1575 – 3 January 1631) was an Italian composer and lutenist of the late Renaissance and early Baroque eras, active mainly in Bavaria and Polish–Lithuanian Commonwealth. He was the son of music theorist and lutenist Vincenzo Galilei, and the younger brother of the scientist Galileo Galilei.

== Life ==
Galilei was born in an ancient noble family in Florence, Grand Duchy of Tuscany. He learned to play the lute at an early age, like his father. Most likely he was destined for a career in Florence, but when his father died in 1591, the sixteen-year-old lutenist was put in the charge of his older brother Galileo Galilei, who was in Padua.

Some other employment had to be found for Michelagnolo, so in 1593, he went to the Polish–Lithuanian Commonwealth, where foreign musicians were much in demand. Most likely he went there with the powerful Lithuanian Radziwiłł family. The Polish–Lithuanian Commonwealth had several sophisticated musical establishments at the end of the 16th and beginning of the 17th centuries, especially at Kraków: Luca Marenzio, one of Italy's most famous madrigal composers, went there for a time, as did lutenists Diomedes Cato and Valentin Bakfark. Lutenists were particularly in demand, and a considerable quantity of lute music was printed in Poland and Lithuania, in cities such as Kraków, Gdańsk, Toruń and Vilnius.

Michelagnolo came back from Poland in 1599, in a second failed attempt to gain employment in Florence in the court of Grand Duke Ferdinando de' Medici, but returned in 1600 to his previous employer in Poland–Lithuania. He stayed there until 1607, at which time he was hired by the Munich Hofkapelle of Duke Maximilian I.

Munich had one of the most progressive musical establishments in the region since the mid-16th century, having employed Orlande de Lassus; Galilei was another of many talented Italian musicians who went there to live and work. He remained in Munich for the rest of his life, fathering eight children, at least three of whom also became lutenists.

His relationship with his brother Galileo became especially difficult in his last years. Many of the letters between the two have been preserved; Michelagnolo ceaselessly implored his elder brother for money, and for help with his difficult children (Vincenzo, born in 1608, was particularly troublesome).

== Music ==
Most of Galilei's music was for ten-course lute, and most was published in his first book, Il primo libro d'intavolatura di liuto (Munich, 1620), which used tablature notation. Some of his pieces appeared singly in other publications.

His music consists of dances such as galliards, voltas, and correntes, grouped loosely into suites, organized by musical mode. Each suite is preceded by a toccata, and the book closes with two paired passamezzos and saltarellos. Stylistically, they are written in the most modern manner of the time, with dissonances, ornaments, and functional tonal progressions indicative of the developing early Baroque style. His musical style was particularly influential in southern Germany, as shown by the demand for his music, even when he was still in the Polish–Lithuanian Commonwealth.
