= Sigismondo d'India =

Italian composer (1582 – before 1629)

- Born: c. 1582; Palermo
- Died: before 19 April 1629
- Occupation: Composer

Sigismondo d'India (c. 1582 – before 19 April 1629) was an Italian composer of the late Renaissance and early Baroque eras. He was one of the most accomplished contemporaries of Monteverdi, and wrote music in many of the same forms as the more famous composer.

== Life ==
d'India was probably born in Palermo, Sicily, in 1582, though details of his life are lacking until around 1600. During the first decade of the 17th century, he probably traveled widely in Italy, meeting composers, acquiring patrons at various aristocratic courts, and absorbing the musical styles at each locale. This was a time of transition in music history, as the polyphonic style of the late Renaissance was giving way to the widely diverse practices of the early Baroque, and d'India seems to have acquired an unusually broad grasp of the total stylistic practice in Italy: the expressive madrigal style of Marenzio, the grand polychoral work of the Venetian School, the conservative polyphonic tradition of the Roman School, the attempts to recover the music of the ancient world in monody and its larger vehicle, the newly developing opera, as well as the mannered, emotionally intense chromatic style of Carlo Gesualdo in Naples. d'India is known to have been in Florence, the birthplace of opera, as well as Mantua, where Monteverdi was working.

In Naples, he probably met Gesualdo, and by 1610, he was in Parma and Piacenza. The next year, 1611, he was hired by Charles Emmanuel I, Duke of Savoy, to direct music in Turin, where he remained until 1623; these were the most productive years of his life, during which he amalgamated the disparate types of music he had heard and absorbed during the years 1600–1610 into a unified style.

After leaving Turin, apparently forced out by malicious gossip, he traveled around Italy for five months before settling for a time at the D'Este court in Modena (October 1623 to April 1624), and then moved to Rome; he seems to have died in Modena, although details on the end of his life are as sparse as they were for its beginning. A record exists of his being granted an appointment in Bavaria at the court of Maximilian I, although there is no evidence he went there; he may have died first.

== Works ==
d'India's output consisted of music in most of the vocal forms of the time, including monodies, madrigals, and motets. His monodies, the most numerous and significant portion of his work, were of many types: arias, both through-composed and strophic, variations over ground basses, laments, madrigals in the monodic style, and others.

Stylistically, d'India's music has features in common with Monteverdi's music of the same period: expressive chromaticism, dissonances with unusual resolutions, and a keen sense of drama. Indeed, some of the longer monodies are effectively operatic scenes, though d'India did not write anything specifically called an "opera."

His polyphonic madrigals often borrow textural ideas from Gesualdo, especially in juxtaposing slow, intensely chromatic music with light, almost delirious diatonic passages; in this regard d'India was one of Gesualdo's few successors (until the 20th century). Some of d'India's later music is unusual in showing aspects of the influence of almost all of the contemporary composers in Italy within a single piece.

Publications:

- Il primo libro de madrigali a 5 voci (1606)
- Libro secondo de madrigali a 5 voci (1611)
- Il terzo libro de madrigali a 5 voci (1615)
- Il quarto libro de madrigali a 5 voci (1616)
- Il quinto libro de madrigali a 5 voci (1616)
- Il sesto libro de madrigali a 5 voci (unknown, presumed lost)
- Settimo libro de madrigali a 5 voci (1624; no copies of the Alto part are known to exist)
- Ottavo libro de madrigali a 5 voci (1624)
- Villanelle alla napolitana, a 3 voci, libro primo (1608)
- Libro Secondo delle Villanesse alla napolitana a 3,4, et 5 voci (1612)
- Le Musiche e Balli a 4 voci (1621)
- Le Musiche di Sigismondo D'India nobile palermitano da cantar solo (1609)
- Le Musiche a 2 voci di Sigismondo D'India (1615)
- Le Musiche del sig. Sigismondo D'India (1618)
- Le Musiche del Cavalier Sigismondo D'India a 1 et 2 voci, libro quarto (1621)
- Le Musiche del Cavalier Sigismondo D'India, libro quinto (1623)
- Novi concentus ecclesiastici, 1610 [2–3vv)
- Liber secundus sacrorum concentuum, 1610 (3–6vv)
- Liber primus motectorum, 1627 (4–5vv, bc)

== Sources and further reading ==
- Bukofzer, Manfred, Music in the Baroque Era. New York: W.W. Norton & Co., 1947. ISBN 0-393-09745-5
- Reese, Gustave. 1959. Music in the Renaissance, revised edition. New York: W.W. Norton & Co.. ISBN 0-393-09530-4
