= Jacopo Corsi =

Italian composer

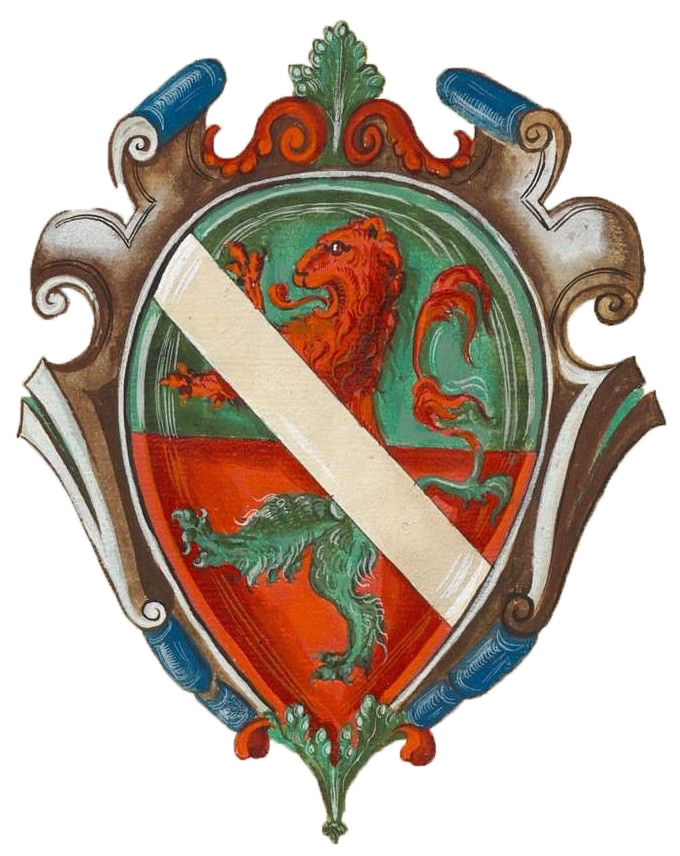
- Born: 17 July 1561; Florence, Italy
- Died: 29 December 1601 (aged 40); Florence, Italy
- Spouses: Settimia Bandini; Laura Corsini
- Issue: Giulia Corsi (b. 1591); Settimia Corsi (b. 1597); Maria Corsi (b. 1599); Marquis Giovanni Corsi of Caiazzo (b. 1600); Lorenzo Corsi (b. 1601); Nun Alessandra Corsi (b. 1602)
- House: Corsi
- Father: Giovanni Corsi
- Mother: Alessandra Della Gherardesca
- Religion: Catholic
- Occupation: Patron, Musician, Poet, Dramatist, Composer, Philanthropist

Jacopo Corsi (17 July 1561 – 29 December 1602) was an Italian composer of the late Renaissance and early Baroque and one of Florence's leading patrons of the arts, after only the Medicis. His best-known work is Dafne (1597/98), whose score he wrote in collaboration with Jacopo Peri. Six fragments of the score have survived, two by Corsi and four by Peri. The libretto, by Ottavio Rinuccini, has survived intact. Despite priority quibbles at the time, Dafne is generally accepted as the first opera.

== Life ==
Born into a Florentine noble family on 17 July 1561, he was the son of Giovanni Corsi (1519–1571) and Alessandra Della Gherardesca (d. 1615). His father was an important merchant who expanded the family activities in Palermo and was also in charge of Cardinal Ferdinando I de' Medici, Grand Duke of Tuscany. In 1569, Giovanni provided important services to the Cardinal but died early in 1571, leaving Jacopo, who was only 10 years old, to be raised by his uncle Antonio with a great inheritance of 90,000 ducats.

Jacopo and his brothers Bardo and Giulio had good investments in mercantile education, which allowed them to continue managing the legacy left by their father. The private tutor of Jacopo and his brothers was Ser Francesco Olmi, who in time became the family's fullest confidant. They also had classes with the experienced musician, the madrigalist Luca Bati, being the first Florentine musician to be paid for fixed tutoring (3 ducats monthly for each child). Bati taught Jacopo and his brothers to sing, play the piano and music theory.

He became the main administrator of family finances in 1582, and redecorated the Corsi Palace, spending almost 300 ducats on a new carriage and other accessories. In 1586, he lost one of his brothers, Giulio Corsi, who died in Madrid, spending many ducats for the exhumation of the body to Florence so that he could be buried in his family's tomb.

In 1586, together with his brother Bardo, he bought Villa Montughi for 5,500 ducats from the bankrupt heirs of Bernardo di Niccolò Soderini and lost his uncle, Antonio Corsi, who had raised him during his childhood, spending almost 1,500 ducats on a pompous and expensive funeral. He also made major investments in the silk market, which made the Corsi one of the wealthiest families in the early 1600s.

He first married Settimia Bandini in Rome in 1591, the daughter of the prominent banker Pierantonio Bandini, who was a friend of his late father Giovanni. He had a daughter with her, Giulia Corsi, in 1591. He was widowed by his first wife the following year, in 1592; Giulia was only a year old at the time.

In 1595, he married Laura Corsini (1573–1602) and in honour of his late former wife, he baptized his second daughter, the firstborn of this relationship, as Settimia Corsi in 1597. This relationship also had other children: Maria Corsi in 1599, Lorenzo Corsi in 1601, Alessandra Corsi, in honour of his mother, in 1602 (the same year he died) and the one who would be known years later as Marquis of Caiazzo, Giovanni Corsi, in 1600, a name that also it had been a tribute to his father, whose name was Giovanni.

He was known for his possessions and for being one of the main patrons and sponsors of Florentine Art, having his name intrinsically linked to that of Giovanni de' Bardi and his Florentine Camerata, responsible for the birth of melodrama in the whole world and sponsoring young musicians and their shows, spreading music and art throughout Florence.

The Bardi and Jacopo camerata, for example, was responsible for the conception we have today of singers and solo songs, in addition to the dissemination of opera and its popularization throughout Italy, both with Dafne (1597) and with Euridice (1600), and later L'Argonautica (1608), produced by Jacopo's brother, Bardo Corsi.

He commissioned great figurative arts such as the statue of Orpheus (Cristofano Stati), in celebration of the success of his play "Euridice", several busts of his family (Giovanni Caccini), and paintings by the most renowned artists, such as Santi di Tito, Niccolò Betti and many others.

He died of “Fever” on 29 December 1602 in the city of Florence, leaving six children and his wife Laura, all children and adolescents at the time, who were raised and became heirs to his brother Bardo, the Marquis of Caiazzo.

His inventory, which was written for Bardo in 1602, was one of the richest in artistic and cultural aspects, with dozens of paintings and sculptures, in addition to innovative works strictly linked to music that had been promoted exclusively by Jacopo and his circle of musicians.

The hereditary title of Maquis of Caiazzo was granted to his brother Bardo Corsi in 1617, just fifteen years after his death, and for this reason, he was the last deceased member of his line not to have received it, passing it directly to his son Giovanni years later.
