= Girolamo Mei =

Italian historian and humanist

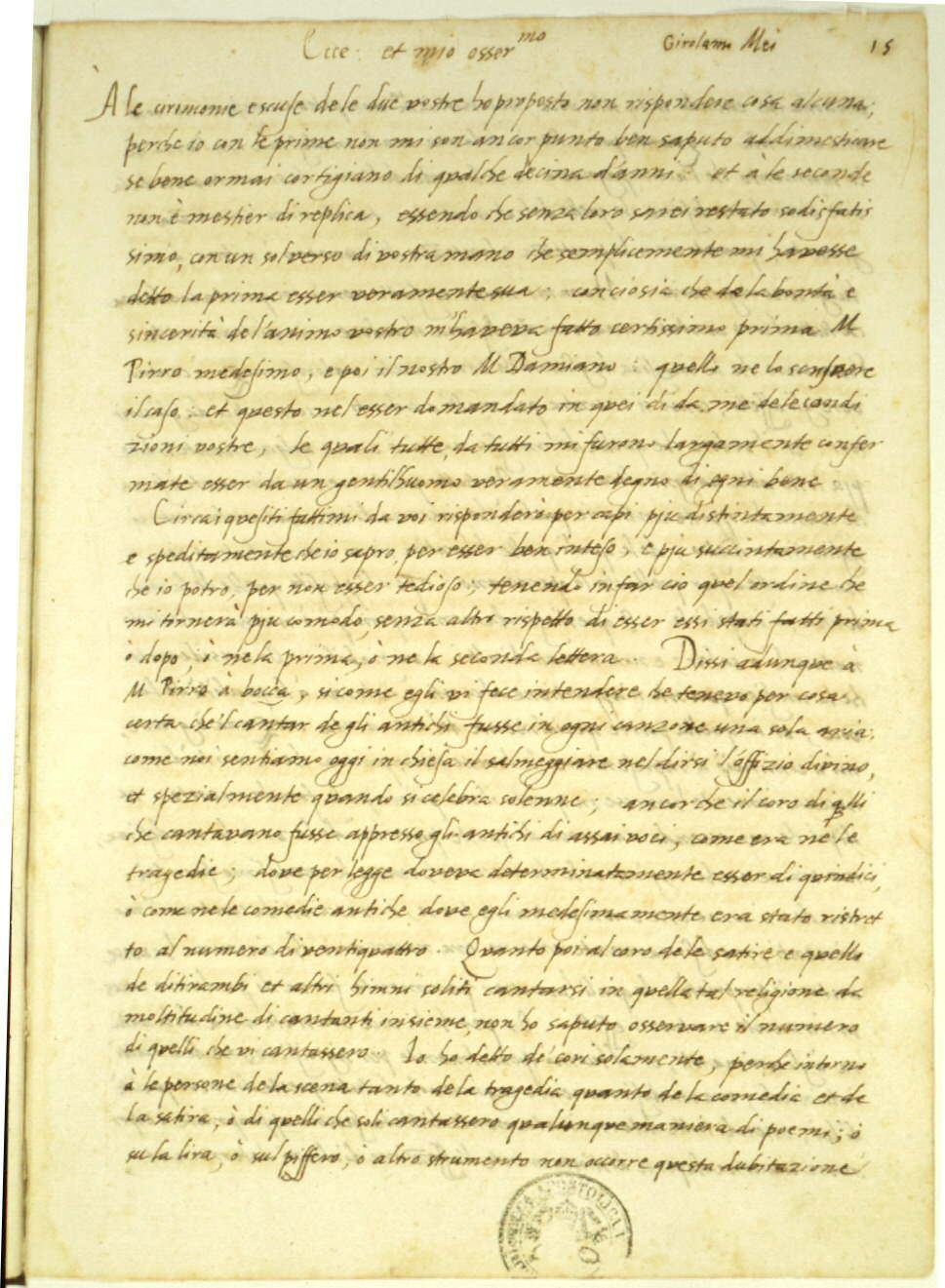
Letter of Girolamo Mei to Vincenzo Galilei, describing the effect of ancient Greek music on human emotions

Girolamo Mei (27 May 1519 – July 1594) was an Italian historian and humanist, famous in music history for providing the intellectual impetus to the Florentine Camerata, which attempted to revive ancient Greek music drama. He was born in Florence, and died in Rome and also used the pseudonym Decimo Corinella da Peretola.

Mei was the first European after Boethius to do a detailed study of ancient Greek music theory. He compiled his findings in a major treatise, De modis musicis antiquorum (not formally published, but written 1568 to 1573). Many of his findings he communicated to Vincenzo Galilei through an extensive correspondence; this information was decisive in the formation of the new musical style which was developing in Florence at the end of the 16th century, the new recitative style (stile recitativo) from which developed monody, the first music dramas, and eventually opera. Galilei and the others in the Florentine Camerata were determined to revive the musical style of ancient Greek drama, and while they may have been mistaken, ultimately, in how it was actually performed, they began, using ideas from Mei, one of the greatest revolutions in music history.

Mei also edited and annotated the tragedies of Aeschylus and Euripides, as well as many other works by classical writers.

== References and further reading ==
- Palisca, Claude (1980). "Girolamo Mei". In Sadie, Stanley (ed.). The New Grove Dictionary of Music and Musicians. Vol. xii (1st ed.). London: Macmillan. p. 67–68.
- Gustave Reese, Music in the Renaissance. New York, W.W. Norton & Co., 1954. ISBN 0-393-09530-4
