= Johann Nauwach =

German composer

Johann Nauwach (1595–1630) was the only significant German composer of solo songs before 1630.

Nauwach was born in Brandenburg, and was a pupil of Heinrich Schütz. Schütz dedicated a motet Glück zu dem Helikon (1627) to Nauwach's graduation. Nauwach died in Dresden.

== Works, editions and recordings ==
- Libro primo di arie passegiate a una voce per cantar, e sonar nel chitarone, & altri simili istromenti Dresden, 1623
- Erster Theil Teütscher Villanellen mit 1., 2. und 3. Stimmen auf die Tiorba, Laute, Clavicymbel, und andere Instrumenta gerichtet Freiberg: Georg Hoffmann, 1627

Recordings

- Andreas Scholl Jetztund kömpt die Nacht herbey
