= Le nuove musiche =

1602 collection of songs by Giulio Caccini

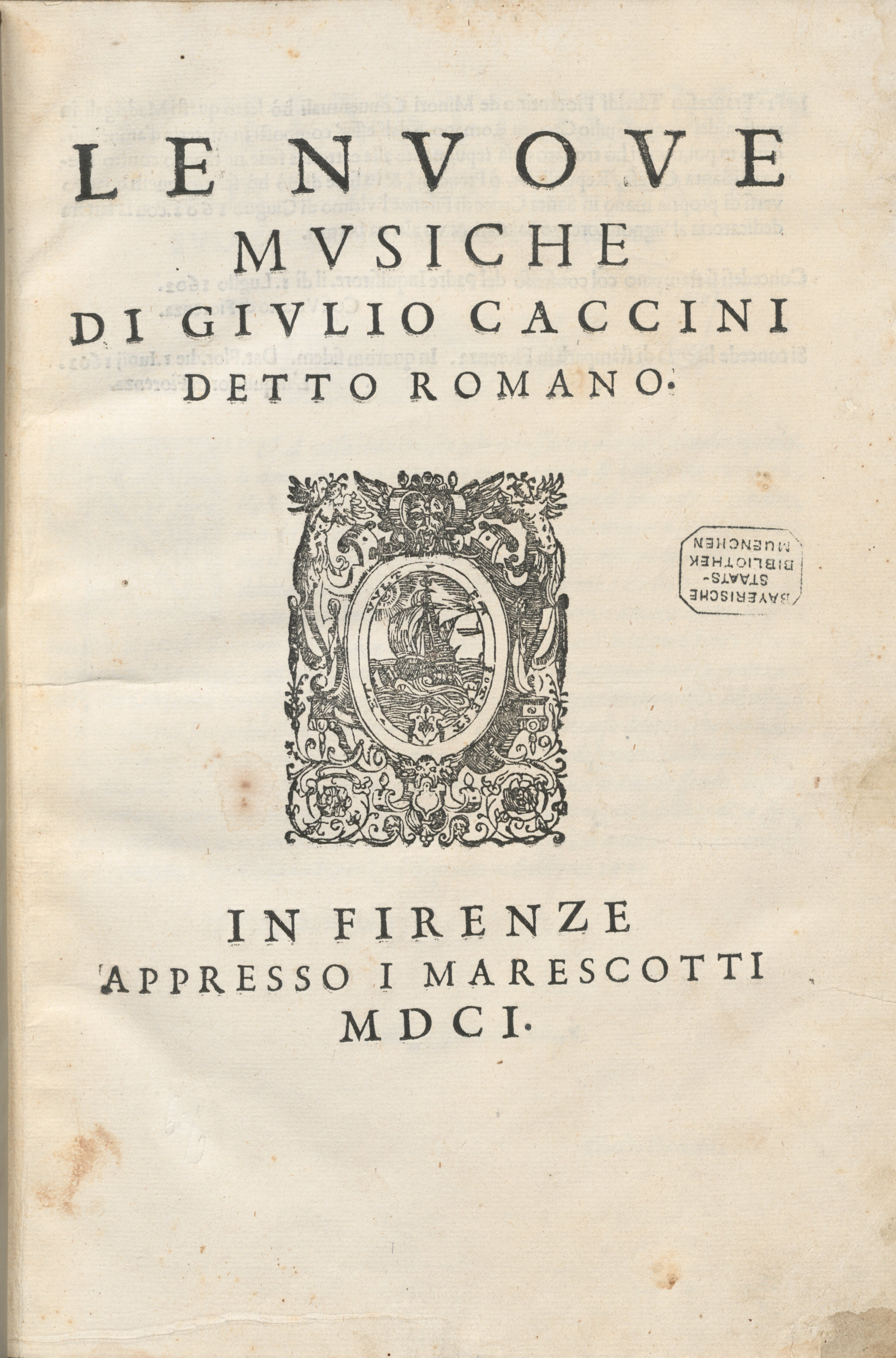
Caccini, Le nuove musiche, 1601, title page

Le nuove musiche ("The New Musics") is a collection of monodies and songs for solo voice and basso continuo by the composer Giulio Caccini, published in Florence in July 1602. It is one of the earliest and most significant examples of music written in the early baroque style of the seconda pratica. It contains 12 madrigals and 10 arias.

The volume was dedicated to Lorenzo Salviati and is dated February 1601, stile fiorentino (1602, stile comune); it was to be published early in 1602 but the printer, Giulio Marescotti, died before publication was completed, and its release was delayed until July 1602.

The introduction to this volume is probably the most clearly written description of the purpose, intent and correct performance of monody from the time. It includes musical examples of ornaments—for example, how a specific passage can be ornamented in several different ways, according to the precise emotion that the singer wishes to convey. Caccini expressed disappointment at inappropriate ornamentation by the singers of his day. The preface also includes effusive praise for the style which he himself invented, and amusing disdain for the work of more conservative composers of the period.

An abridged English translation of Le nuove musiche's preface was printed in John Playford's Introduction to the Skill of Music from 1664 to 1694. Le nuove musiche's success inspired many similar collections in the seventeenth century, and it is regularly anthologized in modern collections.
