= Alessandro Grandi =

Italian composer

Alessandro Grandi (1590 – after June 1630, but in that year) was a northern Italian composer of the early Baroque era, writing in the new stile concertato (lit. 'concerted style'). He was one of the most inventive, influential, and popular composers of the time, probably second only to Monteverdi in northern Italy.

== Life ==
Grandi was born in Venice and spent the first part of his life there, likely studying with Giovanni Gabrieli. He held several posts in Ferrara as maestro di cappella at different cathedrals and academies. In 1617, he won a post at St. Mark's in Venice, during the time Monteverdi was choirmaster there. Eventually, he became Monteverdi's assistant, and during this time seems to have chosen to write works in some of the smaller forms which Monteverdi was neglecting. In 1627, he went to Bergamo, probably because he had an opportunity to be maestro di cappella at a place where he could build up the music program from scratch. Most likely, he met Heinrich Schütz on that composer's second visit to Italy. Unfortunately, after only three years at Bergamo, Grandi died in 1630 during an outbreak of the plague.

== Works ==
Most of Grandi's music is vocal with instrumental accompaniment. Stylistically, his early music is similar to that of Giovanni Gabrieli, with alternating short passages of greatly contrasting rhythms and texture; however he usually wrote for smaller forces. Most of Grandi's early compositions are motets in the stile concertato: some are duets and trios, an innovation in motet writing, which usually involved larger groups. Grandi was one of the few composers who continued to write involved vocal polyphony over the basso continuo right after its introduction—most composers using the continuo in the first decades of the 17th century wrote monodies, or preferred more homophonic textures.

Grandi experimented with extreme emotionalism in some of his music, with chromaticism, ornament, and affectation. While harmonically he was not as adventurous as Gesualdo, he was connected to the larger tradition, and thus his works were almost as influential as Monteverdi's. He ceaselessly innovated, writing monodies with instruments such as violins, and in a sectional form with repeating parts for instruments only—an idea which would develop into the ritornello. The music of Grandi shows a link between the stile concertato which began the Baroque era, and the form of the cantata which culminated in the work of J.S. Bach.

Grandi was one of the most popular composers of his day; his works were published throughout Italy, Germany, and the Low Countries, and continued to be reprinted long after his death. He wrote motets, psalm settings, madrigals, as well as some of the earliest compositions to be called "cantata."
