= Nicolas Achten =

Belgian conductor, singer, lutenist, and harpist

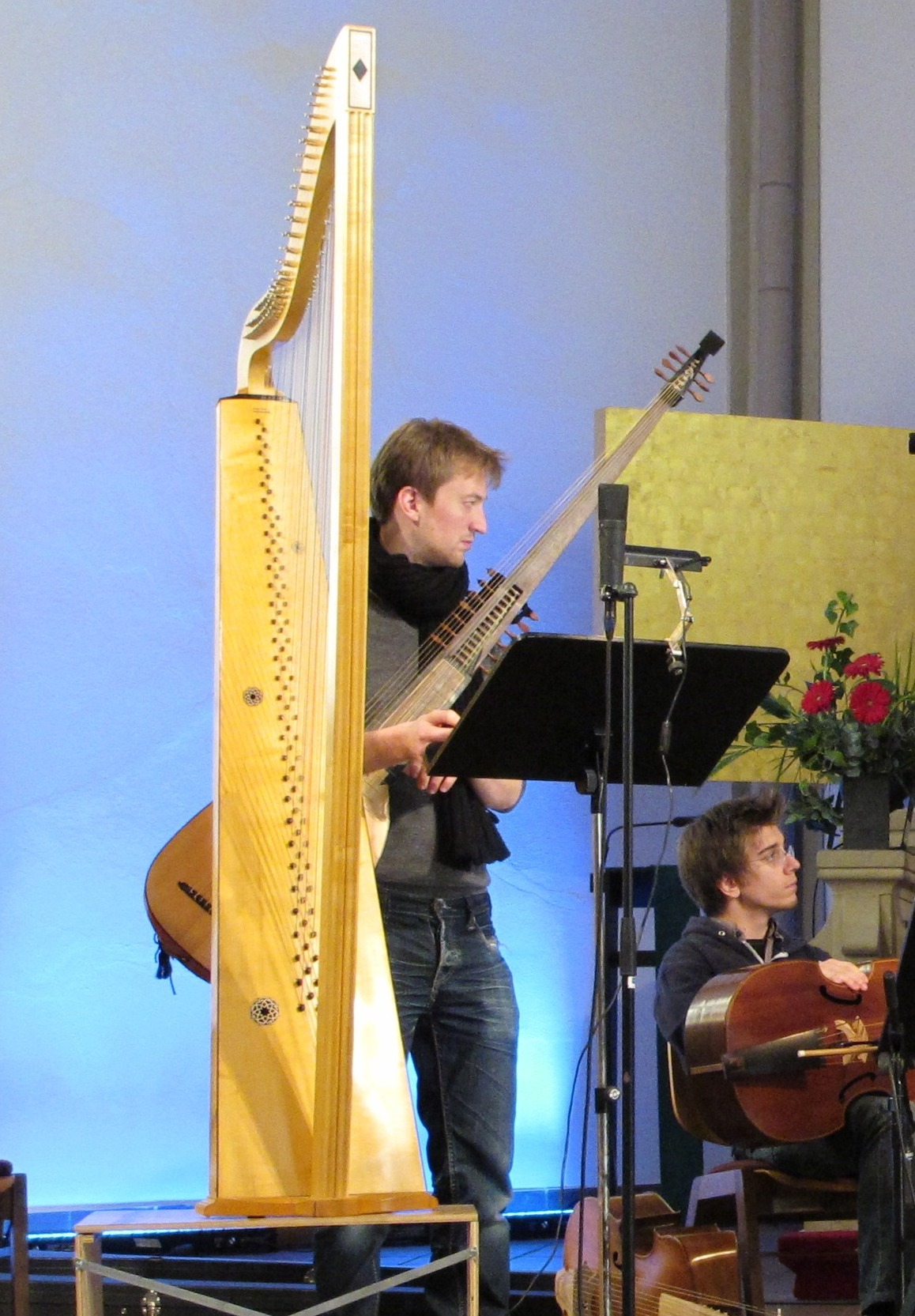
Nicolas Achten

Nicolas Achten (born 25 September 1985, in Brussels) is a Belgian conductor, singer, lutenist, and harpist mainly working in historically informed performance.

Achten is a visiting professor at the University of East Anglia and at the Flanders Operastudio.
