= Giulio Caccini =

Italian composer (1551–1618)

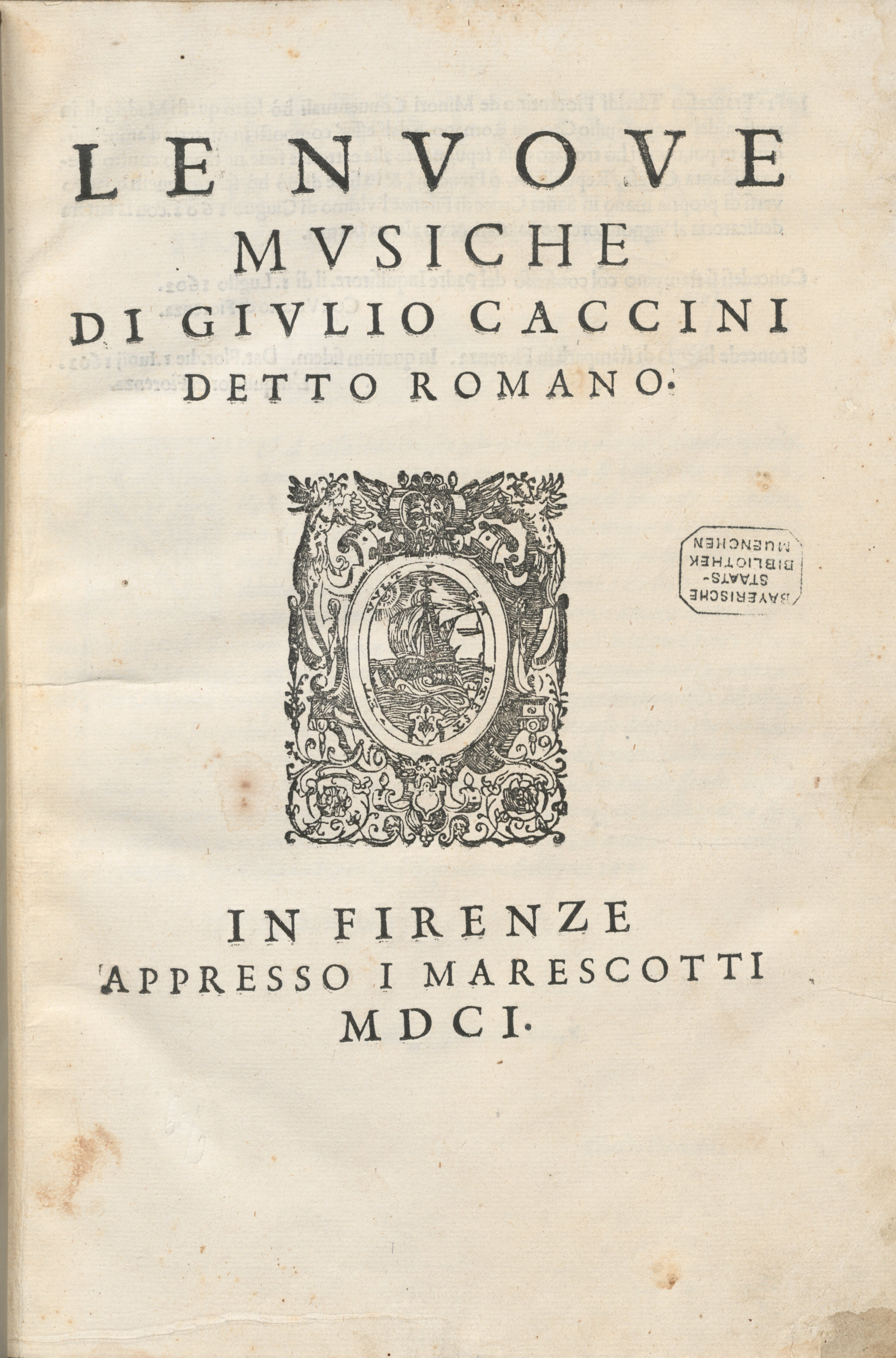
Title page of Le nuove musiche (1601)

Giulio Romolo Caccini (also Giulio Romano) (8 October 1551 – buried 10 December 1618) was an Italian composer, teacher, singer, instrumentalist and writer of the late Renaissance and early Baroque eras. He was one of the founders of the genre of opera, and one of the most influential creators of the new Baroque style. He was also the father of the composer Francesca Caccini and the singer Settimia Caccini.

== Life ==
Little is known about his early life, but he is thought to have been born in Rome, the son of the carpenter Michelangelo Caccini; he was the older brother of the Florentine sculptor Giovanni Caccini. In Rome he studied the lute, the viol and the harp, and began to acquire a reputation as a singer. In the 1560s, Francesco de' Medici, Grand Duke of Tuscany, was so impressed with his talent that he took the young Caccini to Florence for further study.

By 1579, Caccini was singing at the Medici court. He was a tenor, and he was able to accompany himself on the viol or the archlute; he sang at various entertainments, including weddings and affairs of state, and took part in the sumptuous intermedi of the time, the elaborate musical, dramatic, visual spectacles which were one of the precursors of opera. Also during this time he took part in the movement of humanists, writers, musicians and scholars of the ancient world who formed the Florentine Camerata, the group which gathered at the home of Count Giovanni de' Bardi, and which was dedicated to recovering the supposed lost glory of ancient Greek dramatic music. With Caccini's abilities as a singer, instrumentalist, and composer added to the mix of intellects and talents, the Camerata developed the concept of monody—an emotionally affective solo vocal line, accompanied by relatively simple chordal harmony on one or more instruments—which was a revolutionary departure from the polyphonic practice of the late Renaissance.

In the last two decades of the 16th century, Caccini continued his activities as a singer, teacher and composer. His influence as a teacher has perhaps been underestimated, since he trained dozens of musicians to sing in the new style, including the castrato Giovanni Gualberto Magli, who sang in the first production of Monteverdi's first opera Orfeo.

Caccini made at least one further trip to Rome, in 1592, as the secretary to Count Bardi. According to his own writings, his music and singing were met with an enthusiastic response. However, Rome, the home of Palestrina and the Roman School, was musically conservative, and music following Caccini's stylistic lead was relatively rare there until after 1600.

Caccini's character seems to have been less than perfectly honorable, as he was frequently motivated by envy and jealousy, not only in his professional life but for personal advancement with the Medici. On one occasion, he informed the Grand Duke Francesco of two lovers in the Medici household— Eleonora, the wife of Pietro de' Medici, who was having an illicit affair with Bernardino Antinori—and his informing led directly to Eleonora's murder by Pietro. His rivalry with both Emilio de' Cavalieri and Jacopo Peri seems to have been intense: he may have been the one who arranged for Cavalieri to be removed from his post as director of festivities for the wedding of Henry IV of France and Maria de' Medici in 1600 (an event which caused Cavalieri to leave Florence in fury), and he also seems to have rushed his own opera Euridice into print before Peri's opera on the same subject could be published, while simultaneously ordering his group of singers to have nothing to do with Peri's production.

After 1605, Caccini was less influential, though he continued to take part in composition and performance of sacred polychoral music. He died in Florence, and is buried in the church of St. Annunziata.

== Music and influence ==
The stile recitativo, as the newly created style of monody was called, proved to be popular not only in Florence, but elsewhere in Italy. Florence and Venice were the two most progressive musical centers in Europe at the end of the 16th century, and the combination of musical innovations from each place resulted in the development of what came to be known as the Baroque style. Caccini's achievement was to create a type of direct musical expression, as easily understood as speech, which later developed into the operatic recitative, and which influenced numerous other stylistic and textural elements in Baroque music.

"Amor che attendi"
MIDI rendition

Caccini's most influential work was a collection of monodies and songs for solo voice and basso continuo, published in 1602, called Le nuove musiche. Although it is often considered the first published collection of monodies, it was actually preceded by the first collection by Domenico Melli published in Venice in March 1602 (stile veneto, in which the new year began on 1 March). In fact, the collection was Caccini's attempt, evidently successful, to situate himself as the inventor and codifier of monody and basso continuo. Although the collection was not published until July 1602, Caccini's dedication of the collection to Signor Lorenzo Salviati is dated February 1601, in the stile fiorentino, when the new year began on 25 March. This likely explains why the collection is often dated to 1601. Moreover, he explicitly positions himself as the inventor of the style when describing it in the introduction. He writes:

Having thus seen, as I say, that such music and musicians offered no pleasure beyond that which pleasant sounds could give – solely to the sense of hearing, since they could not move the mind without the words being understood – it occurred to me to introduce a kind of music in which one could almost speak in tones, employing in it (as I have said elsewhere) a certain noble negligence of song, sometimes passing through several dissonances while still maintaining the bass note (save when I wished to do it the ordinary way and play the inner parts on the instrument to express some effect – these being of little other value).

The introduction to this volume is probably the most clearly written description of the performance of monody, what Caccini called affetto cantando (passionate singing), from the time (a detailed discussion of the affetto cantando performance style can be found in Toft, With Passionate Voice, pp. 227–40). Caccini's preface includes musical examples of ornaments—for example how a specific passage can be ornamented in several different ways, according to the precise emotion that the singer wishes to convey; it also includes effusive praise for the style and amusing disdain for the work of more conservative composers of the period.

The introduction is also important in the history of music theory, as it contains the first attempt to describe the figured bass of the basso continuo style of the Seconda pratica. Caccini writes:

Note that I have been accustomed, in all places that have come from my pen, to indicate with numbers over the bass part the thirds and the sixths – major when there is a sharp, minor when a flat – and likewise when sevenths or other dissonances are to be made in the inner voices as an accompaniment. It remains only to say that ties in the bass part are used thusly by me: after the [initial] chord, one should play again only the notes [of the harmony] indicated [and not the bass note again], this being (if I am not mistaken) most fitting to the proper usage of the archlute (and easiest way to manage and play it), granted that this instrument is more suitable for accompanying the voice, especially the tenor voice, than any other.

This passage is often overlooked, because it is brief, and located at the very end of the introduction. It is even indicated by Caccini as a "note"; an aside or addendum to the main purpose. It is important to observe, however, that the first explanation of this practice is in the context of an essay about vocal expression and intelligibility. Indeed, it was largely the aim of textual intelligibility that led to the development of this musical style, and to the music of the common practice period.

Two of Caccini's songs were included in A Musical Banquet, a book of songs published by Robert Dowland in England in 1610.

== Works ==
Caccini wrote music for three operas—Euridice (1600), Il rapimento di Cefalo (1600, excerpts published in the first Nuove musiche), and Euridice (1602), though the first two were collaborations with others (mainly Peri for the first Euridice). In addition he wrote the music for one intermedio (Io che dal ciel cader farei la luna) (1589). No music for multiple voices survives, even though the records from Florence indicate he was involved with polychoral music around 1610.

He was predominantly a composer of monody and solo song accompanied by a chordal instrument (he himself played harp), and it is in this capacity that he acquired his immense fame. He published two collections of songs and solo madrigals, both titled Le nuove musiche, in 1602 (new style) and 1614 (the latter as Nuove musiche e nuova maniera di scriverle). Most of the madrigals are through-composed and contain little repetition; some of the songs, however, are strophic. Among the most famous and widely disseminated of these is the madrigal Amarilli, mia bella.

A setting of Ave Maria written by Russian composer Vladimir Vavilov is often misattributed to Caccini.

== Recordings ==
- Euridice. Scherzi Musicali with Nicolas Achten, conductor. 2009, Ricercar RIC 269

== See also ==
- Ave Maria (Vavilov) - a popular composition misattributed to Caccini.
