= L'incoronazione di Poppea =

Opera by Claudio Monteverdi

- Opera by Claudio Monteverdi
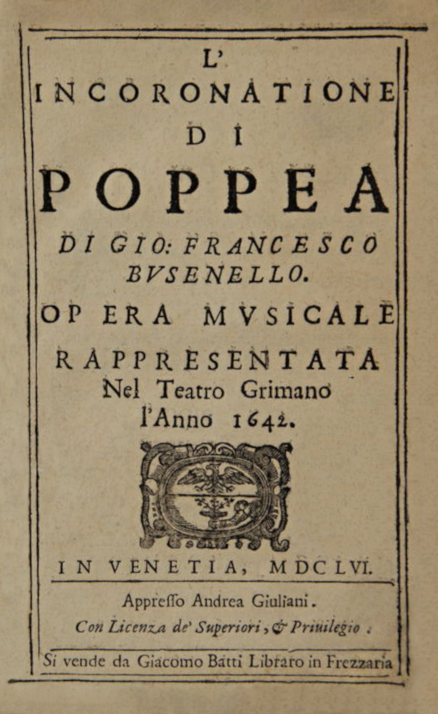
- Title page of the 1656 publication of the libretto, with the variant spelling L'incoronatione

L'incoronazione di Poppea (SV 308, The Coronation of Poppaea) is an Italian opera by Claudio Monteverdi. It was Monteverdi's last opera, with a libretto by Giovanni Francesco Busenello, and was first performed at the Teatro Santi Giovanni e Paolo in Venice during the 1643 carnival season. The opera was revived in Naples in 1651, but was then neglected until the rediscovery of the score in 1888, after which it became the subject of scholarly attention in the late 19th and early 20th centuries. Since the 1960s, the opera has been performed and recorded many times.

The original manuscript of the score does not exist; two surviving copies from the 1650s show significant differences from each other, and each differs to some extent from the libretto. How much of the music is actually Monteverdi's, and how much the product of others, is a matter of dispute. None of the existing versions of the libretto, printed or manuscript, can be definitively tied to the first performance in Venice, the precise date of which is unknown. Details of the original cast are few and largely speculative, and there is no record of the opera's initial public reception. Despite these uncertainties, the work is generally accepted as part of the Monteverdi operatic canon, his last and perhaps his greatest work.

In a departure from traditional literary morality, it is the adulterous liaison of Poppea and Nerone which wins the day, although this triumph is demonstrated by history to have been transitory and hollow. In Busenello's version of the story all the major characters are morally compromised. Written when the genre of opera was only a few decades old, the music for L'incoronazione di Poppea has been praised for its originality, for its melody, and for its reflection of the human attributes of its characters. The work helped to redefine the boundaries of theatrical music and established Monteverdi as the leading musical dramatist of his time.

== Historical context ==
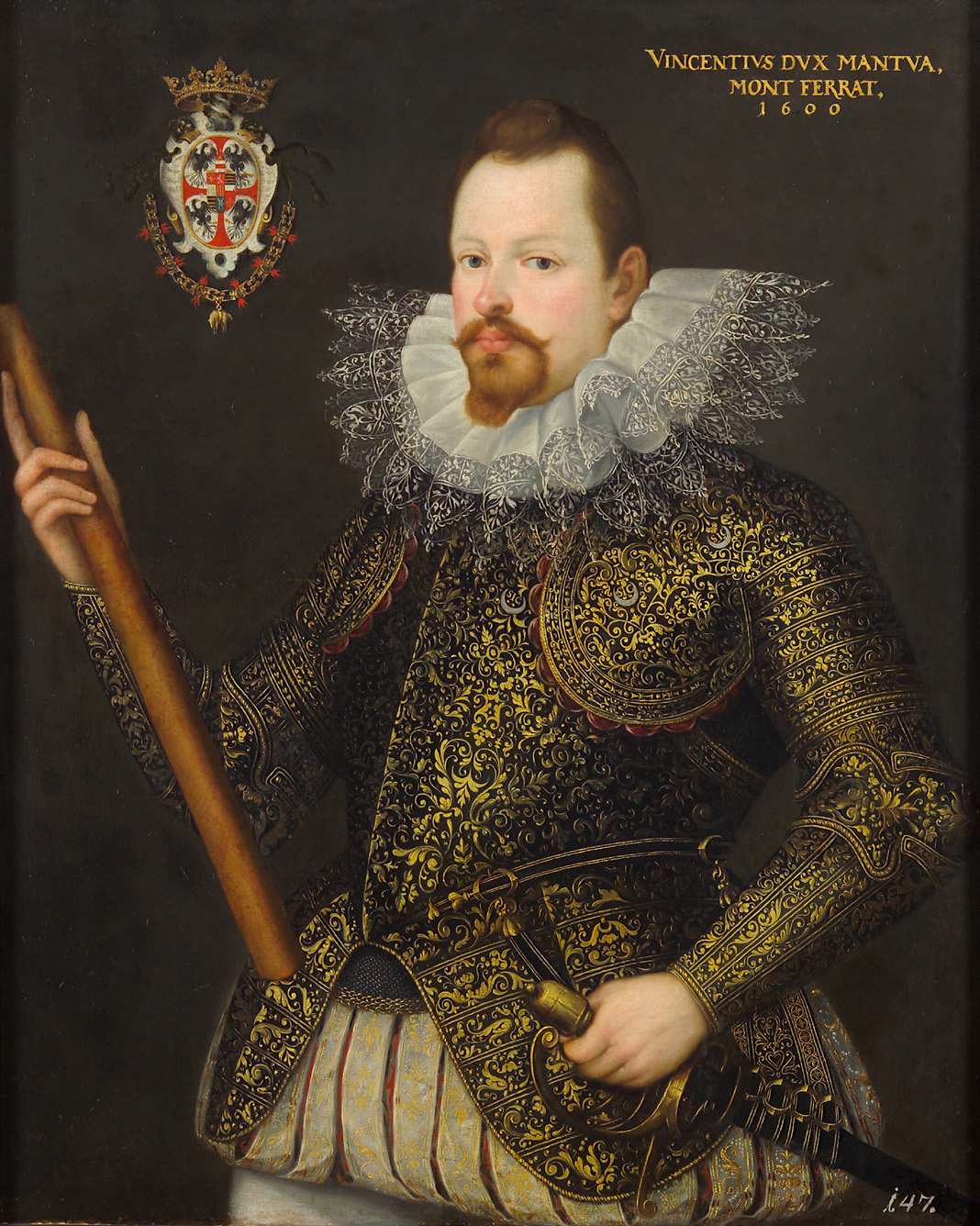
Duke Vincenzo Gonzaga, Monteverdi's employer during his Mantua years when the composer wrote his early operas

Opera as a dramatic genre originated around the turn of the 17th century, although the word itself was not in use before 1650. Precursors of musical drama included pastoral plays with songs and choruses, and the madrigal comedies of the late 16th century. Monteverdi had already established himself as a leading composer of madrigals before writing his first full-length operas in the years 1606–08, while he was in the service of Vincenzo Gonzaga, Duke of Mantua. These works, L'Orfeo and L'Arianna, deal respectively with the Greek myths of Orpheus and Ariadne. After a disagreement in 1612 with Vincenzo's successor, Duke Francesco Gonzaga, Monteverdi moved to Venice to take up the position of director of music at St Mark's Basilica, where he remained until his death in 1643.

Amid his official duties at Venice, Monteverdi maintained an interest in theatrical music and produced several stage works, including the substantial Il combattimento di Tancredi e Clorinda (The battle of Tancred and Clorinda) for the 1624–25 carnival. When the first public opera house in the world opened in Venice in 1637, Monteverdi, by then in his 70th year, returned to writing full-scale opera. He may have been influenced by the solicitations of Giacomo Badoaro, an aristocratic poet and intellectual who sent the elderly composer the libretto for Il ritorno d'Ulisse in patria (The return of Ulysses). For the 1639–40 carnival season, Monteverdi revived L'Arianna at the Teatro San Moisè and later produced his setting of Il ritorno at the Teatro San Cassiano. For the following season he wrote Le nozze d'Enea in Lavinia (The marriage of Aeneas to Lavinia), now lost, which was performed at the third of Venice's new opera theatres, Teatro Santi Giovanni e Paulo.

Another wealthy poet-librettist in the Venice milieu was Giovanni Francesco Busenello (1598–1659), like Badoaro a member of the intellectual society Accademia degli Incogniti. This group of free-thinking intellectuals had significant influence on the cultural and political life of Venice in the mid-17th century, and was particularly active in the promotion of musical theatre. Busenello had worked with Monteverdi's younger contemporary Francesco Cavalli, providing the libretto for Didone (1641), and according to theatre historian Mark Ringer was "among the greatest librettists in the history of opera". It is unclear how and when Busenello met Monteverdi, though both had served in the Gonzaga court. Ringer speculates that they drew joint inspiration from their experiences of the Gonzaga style of rule, "a mixture of artistic cultivation and brutality", and thus developed a shared artistic vision.

== Creation ==
=== Libretto ===
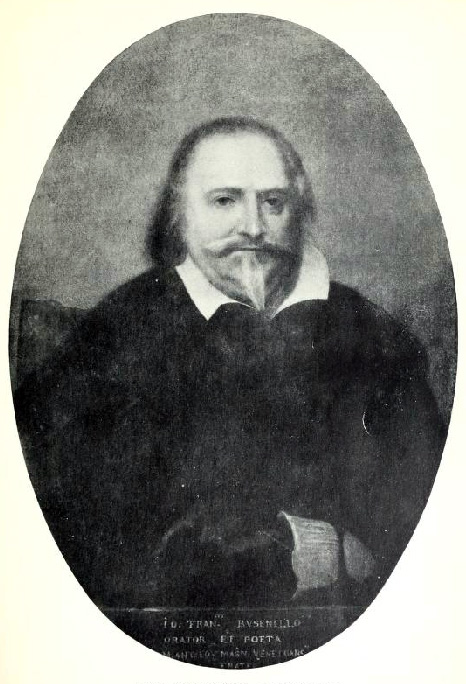
Giovanni Francesco Busenello, librettist of L'incoronazione di Poppea

The main sources for the story told in Busenello's libretto are the Annals of Tacitus; book 6 of Suetonius's history The Twelve Caesars; books 61–62 of Dio Cassius's Roman History; and an anonymous play Octavia (once attributed to the real life Seneca), from which the opera's fictional nurse characters were derived. The main story is based on real people and events. According to the analyst Magnus Schneider, the character of Drusilla was taken from Girolamo Bargagli's 16th-century comedy The Pilgrim Woman.

Busenello condensed historical events from a seven-year period (AD 58 to AD 65) into a single day's action, and imposed his own sequence. He was open about his intention to adapt history for his own purposes, writing in the preface to his libretto that "here we represent these actions differently". Thus he gave his characters different attributes from those of their historical counterparts: Nerone's cruelty is downplayed; the wronged wife Ottavia is presented as a murderous plotter; Poppea's motives are represented as based on genuine love as much as on a lust for power; the depiction of Lucano as a drunken carouser disguises the real life poet Lucan's status as a major Roman poet with marked anti-imperial and pro-republican tendencies.

The libretto has survived in numerous forms—two printed versions, seven manuscript versions or fragments, and an anonymous scenario, or summary, related to the original production. One of the printed editions relates to the opera's 1651 Naples revival; the other is Busenello's final version published in 1656 as part of a collection of his libretti. The manuscripts are all from the 17th century, though not all are specifically dated; some are "literary" versions unrelated to performances. The most significant of the manuscript copies is that discovered in Udine, Northern Italy, in 1997 by Monteverdi scholar Paolo Fabbri. This manuscript, according to music historian Ellen Rosand, "bristles with the immediacy of a performance", and is the only copy of the libretto that mentions Monteverdi by name. This, and other descriptive details missing from other copies, leads Rosand to speculate that the manuscript was copied during the course of a performance. This impression is reinforced, she says, by the inclusion of a paean of praise to the singer (Anna di Valerio according to Schneider) who played the role of Poppea. Although its dating is uncertain, the manuscript's affinity with the original scenario has led to speculation that the Udine version may have been compiled from the first performance.

=== Composition ===
Two versions of the musical score of L'incoronazione exist, both from the 1650s. The first was rediscovered in Venice in 1888, the second in Naples in 1930. The Naples score is linked to the revival of the opera in that city in 1651. Both scores contain essentially the same music, though each differs from the printed libretto and has unique additions and omissions. In each score the vocal lines are shown with basso continuo accompaniment; the instrumental sections are written in three parts in the Venice score, four parts in the Naples version, without in either case specifying the instruments. Conductor Nikolaus Harnoncourt, a leading Monteverdi interpreter, refers to the contemporary practice of leaving much of a score open, to allow for differing local performance conditions. Another convention made it unnecessary to write down detail that performers would take for granted. Neither the Venice nor Naples score can be linked to the original performance; although the Venice version is generally regarded as the more authentic, modern productions tend to use material from both.

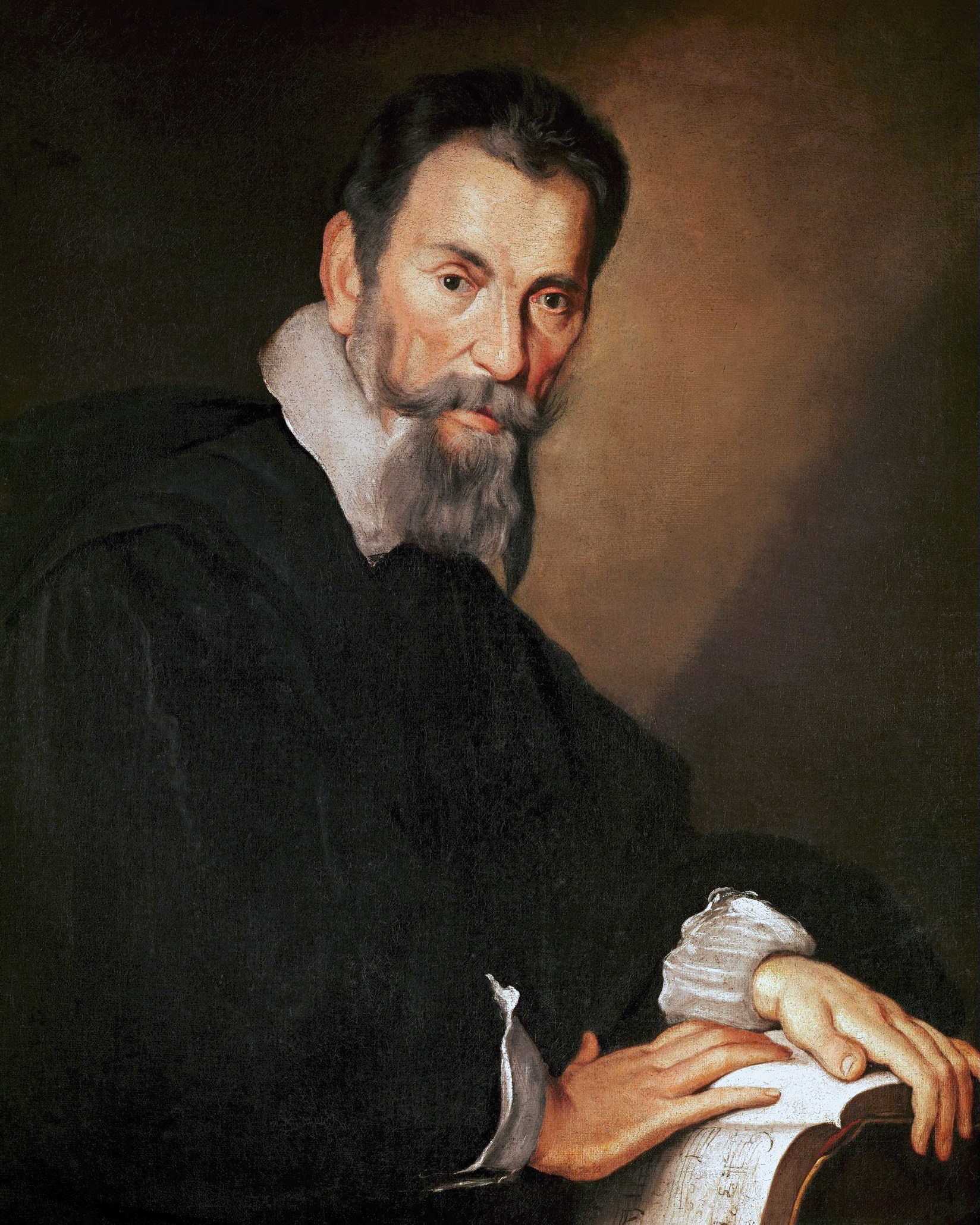
Claudio Monteverdi

The question of authorship—essentially of how much of the music is Monteverdi's—is a contentious one, which Rosand acknowledges might never be entirely resolved. Virtually none of the contemporary documentation mentions Monteverdi, and music by other composers has been identified in the scores, including passages found in the score of Francesco Sacrati's opera La finta pazza. A particular style of metric notation used in some passages of the L'incoronazione scores suggests the work of younger composers. The most debated areas of authorship are parts of the prologue, Ottone's music, the flirtation scene between Valetto and Damigella, and the coronation scene including the final "Pur ti miro" duet.

Modern scholarship inclines to the view that L'incoronazione was the result of collaboration between Monteverdi and others, with the old composer playing a guiding role. Composers who may have assisted include Sacrati, Benedetto Ferrari and Francesco Cavalli. Ringer suggests that Monteverdi's age and health may have prevented him from completing the opera without help from younger colleagues; he speculates about an arrangement resembling "the workshop of Rubens, who might design a painting and handle the important details himself but leave the more mundane aspects ... to younger apprentice artists". The musicologist Alan Curtis believes that only a single collaborator was involved, and published his 1989 edition of L'incoronazione under the joint authorship of Monteverdi and Sacrati. The American musical analyst Eric Chafe's study of Monteverdi's tonal language supports the collaboration theory and postulates that some of the sections in question, including the prologue, the coronation scene and the final duet, reflect Monteverdi's intentions and may have been written under his direct supervision.

=== Morality ===
L'incoronazione di Poppea is frequently described as a story in which virtue is punished and greed rewarded, running counter to the normal conventions of literary morality. The musicologist Tim Carter calls the opera's characters and their actions "famously problematic", and its messages "at best ambiguous and at worst perverted", while Rosand refers to an "extraordinary glorification of lust and ambition". The critic Edward B. Savage asserts that despite the lack of a moral compass in virtually all the main characters, Busenello's plot is itself essentially moral, and that "this morality is sustained by the phenomenon of dramatic irony". From their knowledge of Roman history, audiences in Venice would have recognised that the apparent triumph of love over virtue, celebrated by Nerone and Poppea in the closing duet, was in reality hollow, and that not long after this event the pregnant Poppea would die either in childbirth or at the hands of Nerone. They would have known, too, that Nerone himself committed suicide a few years later, and that others—Ottavia, Lucano, Ottone—also met untimely deaths.

Seventeenth-century Rome, under autocratic papal rule, was perceived by republican Venetians as a direct threat to their liberties. Rosand has suggested that Venetian audiences would have understood the Poppea story in the context of their own times as a moral lesson demonstrating the superiority of Venice, and that "such immorality was only possible in a decaying society, not [in] a civilized nation". Rosand concludes that the opera's broad moral compass places it first in a long tradition of operatic works that embraces Mozart's Don Giovanni and Verdi's Don Carlos. Music analyst Clifford Bartlett writes that "Monteverdi's glorious music goes beyond Busenello's cynical realism, and presents human behaviour in a better light".

== Roles ==
The score for L'incoronazione features 28 singing characters, including 7 ensemble parts, of which the two Amori may only have appeared in the 1651 Naples production. Schneider surmised that extensive doubling was employed in the original Venetian production, allowing the opera to be staged with 11 singers: two female sopranos, three male sopranos (castrati), two contraltos (castrati), two tenors and two basses. He proposed the following cast and doubling plan for the 1643 premiere, based on his examination of contemporary casting and doubling practices, the correspondence of the impresario Marquess Cornelio Bentivoglio, and the libretto for La finta savia, which preceded Poppea on the stage of the Santi Giovanni e Paolo in the 1643 Carnival season, possibly featuring the same cast.

Roles in the Venetian premiere
Role	Singer (role doubling is speculative)	Voice type	Appearances (silent appearance in parenthesis)
La Fortuna, Fortune	Anna di Valerio	soprano	Prologue
Poppea, Poppaea, a most noble lady, mistress of Nero, raised by him to the seat of empire	Anna di Valerio	soprano	Act 1: III, IV, X, XI; Act 2: X, (XI), XII; Act 3: V, VIII
La Virtù, Virtue	Anna Renzi	soprano	Prologue
Ottavia, Octavia, reigning Empress, who is repudiated by Nero	Anna Renzi	soprano	Act 1: V, VI; Act 2: VII; Act 3: VI
Drusilla, a lady of court, in love with Otho	Anna Renzi	soprano	Act 1: XIII; Act 2: VIII, IX; Act 3: I, II, III, IV
Nerone, Nero, Roman Emperor	Stefano Costa	soprano	Act 1: III, IX, X; Act 2: V; Act 3: III, IV, V, VIII
Amore, Cupid	Rabacchio	soprano	Prologue; Act 2: XI, XII; Act 3: VIII
Valletto, a valet, page of the Empress	Rabacchio	soprano	Act 1: (V), VI; Act 2: IV, (VII), VIII
Pallade, Pallas	Ponzanino	soprano	Act 1: VIII
Damigella, a lady-in-waiting to the Empress	Ponzanino	soprano	Act 2: IV
Venere, Venus	Ponzanino	soprano	Act 3: VIII
Ottone, Otho, a most noble lord	Fritellino	contralto	Act 1: I, (X), XI, XII, XIII; Act 2: VI, VII, IX, XII; Act 3: IV
Arnalta, aged nurse and confidante of Poppaea	Vecchia singer	contralto	Act 1: IV; Act 2: X, XII; Act 3: II, III, (IV), (V), VII
Nutrice, the nurse of the Empress Octavia	Vecchia singer	contralto	Act 1: V, (VI); Act 2: (VII), VIII
Famigliare I, first friend of Seneca	Vecchia singer	contralto	Act 2: III
Soldato pretoriano I, first Praetorian soldier	Roman singer	tenor	Act 1: (I), II, (III), (IX), (X); Act 3: (III), (IV)
Famigliare II, second friend of Seneca	Roman singer	tenor	Act 2: III
Lucano, Lucan, poet, intimate of Nero	Roman singer	tenor	Act 2: V
Console II, a consul	Roman singer	tenor	Act 3: (VIII)
Soldato pretoriano II, second Praetorian soldier	Captain Pompeo Conti	tenor	Act 2: (I), II, (III), (IX), (X), Act 3: (III), (IV)
Liberto, a freedman, captain of the Praetorian Guard	Captain Pompeo Conti	tenor	Act 2: II
Console I, a consul	Captain Pompeo Conti	tenor	Act 3: VIII
Seneca, philosopher, Nero's tutor	Don Giacinto Zucchi	bass	Act 1: VI, VII, VIII, IX; Act 2: I, II, III
Littore, a lictor	Don Giacinto Zucchi	bass	Act 3: II, III, (IV)
Tribuno II, a tribune	Don Giacinto Zucchi	bass	Act 3: (VIII)
Mercurio, Mercury	Florentine singer	bass	Act 2: I
Famigliare III, third friend of Seneca	Florentine singer	bass	Act 2: III
Tribuno I, a tribune	Florentine singer	bass	Act 3: VIII

== Synopsis ==
The action takes place in Imperial Rome around AD 60, in and around Poppea's villa and in various locations within the imperial palace. (Note: Translations are from the English libretto by Avril Bardoni, 1989, included with the 1990 Virgin Classics recording VCT 7 90775-2-4)

=== Prologue ===
The goddesses of Fortune and Virtue dispute which of them has the most power over humankind. They are interrupted by the god of Love, who claims greater power than either: "I tell the virtues what to do, I govern the fortunes of men." (Note: Io le virtuti insegno, io le fortune domo) When they have heard his story, he says, they will admit his superior powers.

=== Act 1 ===
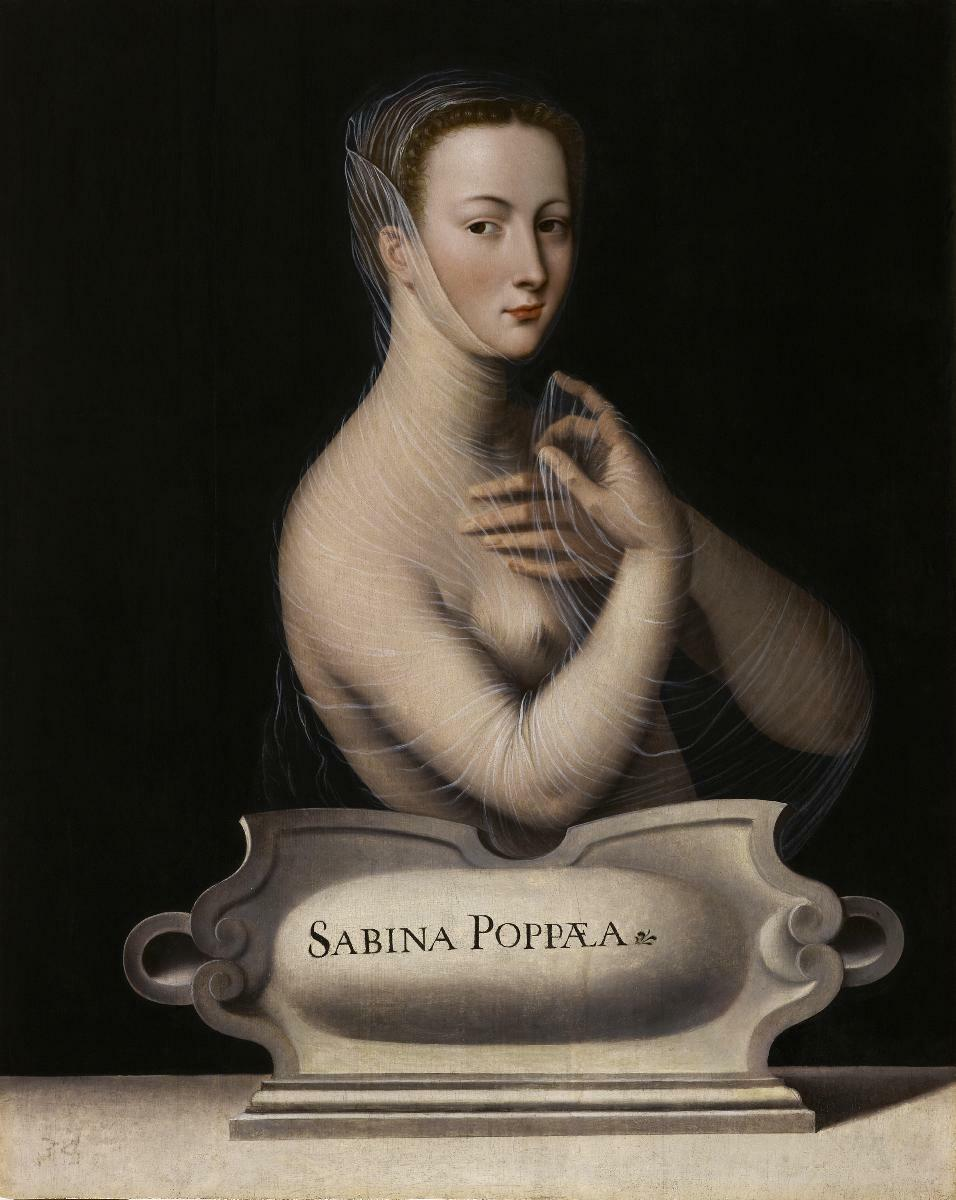
Poppea, represented in a 16th-century painting

Ottone arrives at Poppea's villa, intent on pursuing his love. Seeing the house guarded by the Emperor Nerone's soldiers he realises he has been supplanted, and his love song turns to a lament: "Ah, ah, perfidious Poppea!" (Note: Ahi, ahi, perfida Poppea!) He leaves, and the waiting soldiers gossip about their master's amorous affairs, his neglect of matters of state and his treatment of the Empress Ottavia. Nerone and Poppea enter and exchange words of love before Nerone departs. Poppea is warned by her nurse, Arnalta, to be careful of the empress's wrath and to distrust Nerone's apparent love for her, but Poppea is confident: "I fear no setback at all." (Note: Non temo di noia alcuna)

The scene switches to the palace, where Ottavia bemoans her lot; "Despised queen, wretched consort of the emperor!" (Note: Regina disprezzata, del monarca romano afflitta moglie!) Her nurse suggests she take a lover of her own, advice which Ottavia angrily rejects. Seneca, Nerone's former tutor, addresses the empress with flattering words, and is mocked by Ottavia's page, Valleto, who threatens to set fire to the old man's beard. Left alone, Seneca receives a warning from the goddess Pallade that his life is in danger. Nerone enters and confides that he intends to displace Ottavia and marry Poppea. Seneca demurs; such a move would be divisive and unpopular. "I care nothing for the senate and the people", (Note: Del senato e del popolo non curo) replies Nerone, and when the sage persists he is furiously dismissed. Poppea joins Nerone, and tells him that Seneca claims to be the power behind the imperial throne. This so angers Nerone that he instructs his guards to order Seneca to commit suicide.

After Nerone leaves, Ottone steps forward and after failing to persuade Poppea to reinstate him in her affections, privately resolves to kill her. He is then comforted by a noblewoman, Drusilla; realising that he can never regain Poppea he offers to marry Drusilla, who joyfully accepts him. But Ottone admits to himself: "Drusilla is on my lips, Poppea is in my heart." (Note: Drusilla ho in bocca ed ho Poppea nel coro)

=== Act 2 ===
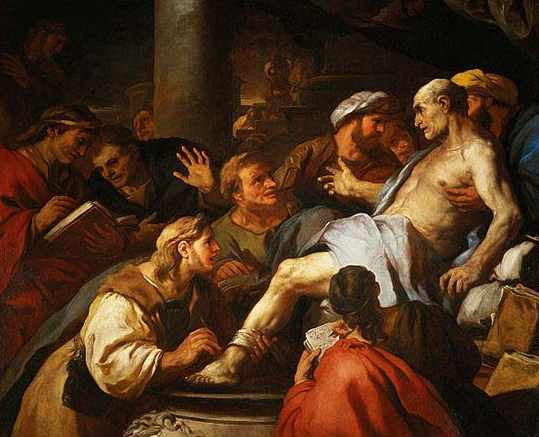
The Death of Seneca (Luca Giordano, 1684)

In his garden, Seneca learns from the god Mercurio that he is soon to die. The order duly arrives from Nerone, and Seneca instructs his friends to prepare a suicide bath. His followers try to persuade him to remain alive, but he rejects their pleading. "The warm current of my guiltless blood shall carpet with royal purple my road to death." (Note: In un tepido rivo questo sangue innocente ch'io vo', vo' che vada a imporporarmi del morir la strada) At the palace Ottavia's page flirts with a lady-in-waiting, while Nerone and the poet Lucano celebrate the death of Seneca in a drunken, cavorting song contest, and compose love songs in honour of Poppea. Elsewhere in the palace, Ottone, in a long soliloquy, ponders how he could have thought to kill Poppea with whom he remains hopelessly in love. He is interrupted by a summons from Ottavia, who to his dismay orders him to kill Poppea. Threatening to denounce him to Nerone unless he complies, she suggests that he disguise himself as a woman to commit the deed. Ottone agrees to do as she bids, privately calling on the gods to relieve him of his life. He then persuades Drusilla to lend him her clothes.

In the garden of Poppea's villa, Arnalta sings her mistress to sleep while the god of Love looks on. Ottone, now disguised as Drusilla, enters the garden and raises his sword to kill Poppea. Before he can do so, Love strikes the sword from his hand, and he runs away. His fleeing figure is seen by Arnalta and the now awakened Poppea, who believe that he is Drusilla. They call on their servants to give chase, while Love sings triumphantly "I protected her!" (Note: Ho difesa Poppea!)

=== Act 3 ===
Drusilla muses on the life of happiness before her, when Arnalta arrives with a lictor. Arnalta accuses Drusilla of being Poppea's assailant, and she is arrested. As Nerone enters, Arnalta denounces Drusilla, who protests her innocence. Threatened with torture unless she names her accomplices, Drusilla decides to protect Ottone by confessing her own guilt. Nerone commands her to suffer a painful death, at which point Ottone rushes in and reveals the truth: that he had acted alone, at the command of the Empress Ottavia, and that Drusilla was innocent of complicity. Nerone is impressed by Drusilla's fortitude, and in an act of clemency spares Ottone's life, ordering him banished. Drusilla chooses exile with him. Nerone now feels entitled to act against Ottavia and she is exiled, too. This leaves the way open for him to marry Poppea, who is overjoyed: "No delay, no obstacle can come between us now." (Note: Non più s'interporrà noia o dimora)

Ottavia bids a quiet farewell to Rome, while in the throne room of the palace the coronation ceremony for Poppea is prepared. The Consuls and Tribunes enter, and after a brief eulogy place the crown on Poppea's head. Watching over the proceedings is the god of Love with his mother, Venere, and a divine chorus. Nerone and Poppea sing a rapturous love duet ("I gaze at you, I possess you" (Note: Pur ti miro, pur ti godo)) as the opera ends.

== Reception and performance history ==
=== Early performances ===
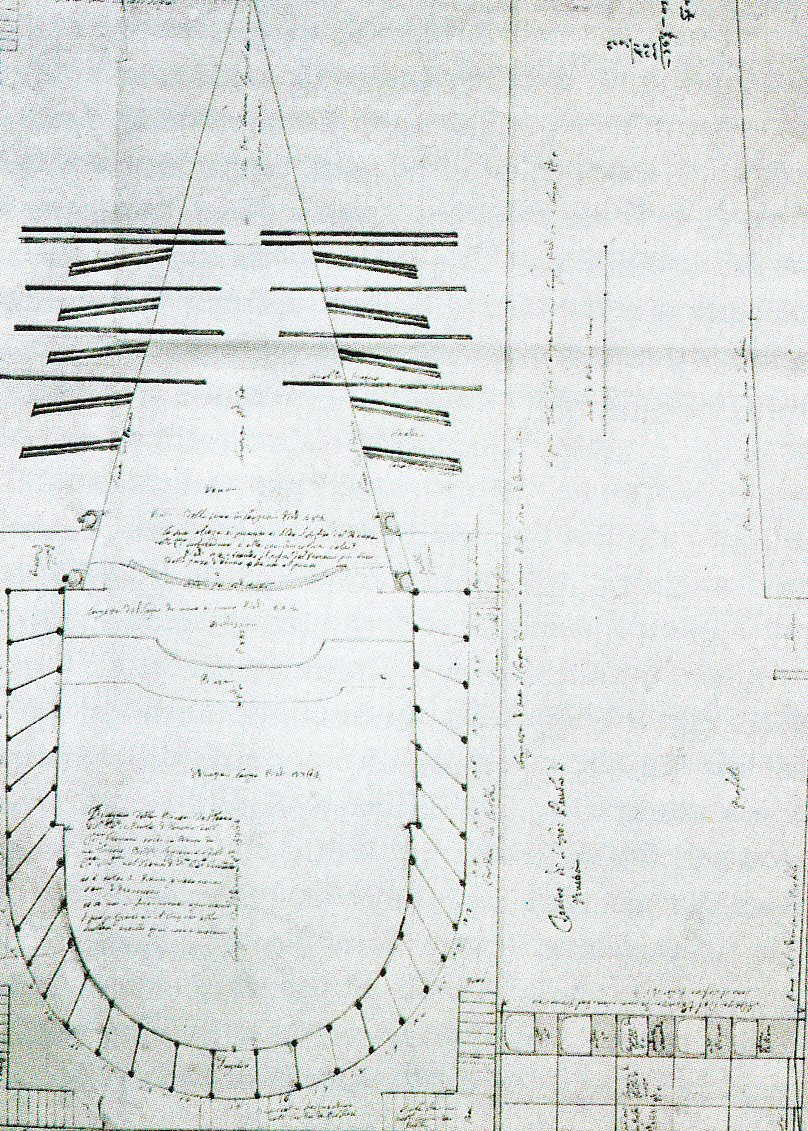
Floor plan of the Teatro Santi Giovanni e Paolo (1654)

L'incoronazione di Poppea was first performed at the Teatro Santi Giovanni e Paolo, Venice, as part of the 1642–43 carnival season. The theatre, opened in 1639, had earlier staged the première of Monteverdi's opera Le Nozze d'Enea in Lavinia, and a revival of the composer's Il ritorno d'Ulisse in patria. The theatre was later described by an observer: "... marvellous scene changes, majestic and grand appearances [of the performers] ... and a magnificent flying machine; you see, as if commonplace, glorious heavens, deities, seas, royal palaces, woods, forests ...". The theatre held about 900 people, and the stage was much bigger than the auditorium.

The date of the first performance of L'incoronazione and the number of times the work was performed are unknown; the only date recorded is that of the beginning of the carnival, 26 December 1642. A surviving scenario, or synopsis, prepared for the first performances, gives neither the date nor the composer's name. The identity of only one of the première cast is known for certain: Anna Renzi, who played Ottavia. Renzi, in her early twenties, is described by Ringer as "opera's first prima donna" and was, according to a contemporary source, "as skillful in acting as she [was] excellent in music". On the basis of the casting of the opera which shared the theatre with L'incoronazione during the 1642–43 season, it is possible that Poppea was played by Anna di Valerio, and Nerone by the castrato Stefano Costa. There are no surviving accounts of the opera's public reception, unless the encomium to the singer playing Poppea, part of the libretto documentation discovered at Udine in 1997, relates to the first performance.

There is only one documented early revival of L'incoronazione, in Naples in 1651. The fact that it was revived at all is noted by Carter as "remarkable, in an age where memories were short and large-scale musical works often had limited currency beyond their immediate circumstance". Thereafter there are no known records of the work's performance for more than 250 years.

=== Rediscovery ===
After two centuries in which Monteverdi had been largely forgotten as a composer of opera, interest in his theatrical works revived in the late 19th century. A shortened version of Orfeo was performed in Berlin in 1881; a few years later the Venice score of L'incoronazione was rediscovered, leading to a surge of scholarly attention. In 1905, in Paris, the French composer Vincent d'Indy directed a concert performance of L'incoronazione, limited to "the most beautiful and interesting parts of the work". D'Indy's edition was published in 1908, and his version was staged at the Théâtre des Arts, Paris, on 5 February 1913, the first recorded theatrical performance of the work since 1651. The work was not received uncritically; the dramatist Romain Rolland, who had assisted d'Indy, wrote that Monteverdi had "sacrifice[d] freedom and musical beauty to beauty of line. Here we no longer have the impalpable texture of musical poetry that we admire in Orfeo."

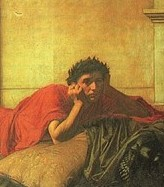
Nerone pondering his misdeeds (Detail of 1878 painting by J. W. Waterhouse)

In April 1926 the German-born composer Werner Josten directed the opera's first American performance, at Smith College, Massachusetts where he was professor of music. His production was based on d'Indy's edition. The following year, on 27 October, L'incoronazione received its British première, with a performance at Oxford Town Hall by members of the Oxford University Opera Club using a score edited by Jack Westrup. In the 1930s several editions of the opera were prepared by leading contemporary musicians, including Gustav Mahler's son-in-law Ernst Krenek, Hans Redlich, Carl Orff (who left his version incomplete), and Gian Francesco Malipiero. Malipiero's edition was used to stage performances in Paris (1937) and Venice (1949). The Redlich edition was performed at Morley College, London on May 21, 1948, under the direction of Michael Tippett.

Richard Strauss made reference to L'incoronazione in the act 3 music lesson scene of his 1935 opera, Die schweigsame Frau, completely recomposing the act 2, scene 5 duet "Sento un certo non so che" in his own florid and late-Romantic idiom as one of many uses of preexisting musical material to set an appreciably antique atmosphere by the standards of the time. In that scene, the duet is used as an excuse for the title role to flirt with her husband, in disguise as a singing teacher.

Until the 1960s performances of L'incoronazione were relatively rare in commercial opera theatres, but they became increasingly frequent in the decade that saw the quatercentenary of Monteverdi's birth. The 1962 Glyndebourne Festival anticipated the quatercentenary with a lavish production using a new edition by Raymond Leppard. This version, controversially, was adapted for a large orchestra, and though it was enthusiastically received it has subsequently been described by Carter as a "travesty", and its continuing use in some modern productions as indefensible. A version by Erich Kraack was conducted by Herbert von Karajan at the Vienna State Opera in 1963; the following decades saw performances at Lincoln Center in New York, Turin, Venice and a revival of the Leppard version at Glyndebourne. The Venice performance at La Fenice on 5 December 1980 was based on Alan Curtis's new edition, described by Rosand as "the first to attempt a scholarly collation and rationalization of the sources". The Curtis edition was used by Santa Fe Opera in August 1986, in a production which according to The New York Times "gave music precedence over musicology", resulting in a performance that was "rich and stunningly beautiful".

=== Recent revivals ===
The 350th anniversary of Monteverdi's death, celebrated in 1993, brought a further wave of interest in his works, and since that time performances of L'incoronazione have been given in opera houses and music festivals all over the world. In April 1994 the Juilliard School in New York presented a version based on Curtis's edition, with an orchestra that mixed baroque and modern elements. Allan Kozinn wrote in The New York Times that this production had done well to resolve daunting problems arising from Monteverdi's having left instrumentation and scoring details open, and from the numerous competing versions of the score. In 2000 the work was chosen by Opéra de Montréal as the company's first venture into baroque opera, with a performance directed by Renaud Doucet. Opera Canada reported that Doucet had found "a perfect rhetoric for a modern crowd, creating an atmosphere of moral ambivalence that the courtiers of Monteverdi's day would have taken for granted". Less successful, in the critics' eyes, was the innovative English National Opera (ENO) production directed by Chen Shi-Zheng in October 2007. According to the London Evening Standard critic Fiona Maddocks the cast was strong, but they all seemed to be playing in the wrong roles. For unexplained reasons much of the action took place underwater; at one point "a snorkeller flip-flops across the stage in a harness". Seneca "wore green Wellington boots and pushed a lawnmower". At the end of 2007, in his opera review of the year in The Daily Telegraph, Rupert Christiansen compared ENO's production unfavourably with a punk musical version of the opera that had been staged during that year's Edinburgh International Festival.

In May 2008 L'incoronazione returned to Glyndebourne in a new production by Robert Carsen, with Leppard's large-scale orchestration replaced by the period instruments of the Orchestra of the Age of Enlightenment under Emmanuelle Haïm. The Organ's reviewer praised the vocal quality of the performers, found Haïm's handling of the orchestra "a joy throughout" and declared the whole production "a blessed relief" after the previous year's ENO staging. On 19 August the Glyndebourne singers and the orchestra, led by Haïm, presented a semi-staged version of the opera at the 2008 the BBC Proms at the Royal Albert Hall. Elsewhere the French-based ensemble Les Arts Florissants, under its director William Christie, presented the Monteverdi trilogy of operas (L'Orfeo, Il ritorno d'Ulisse and L'incoronazione) in the period 2008 to 2010, with a series of performances at the Teatro Real in Madrid.

In 2012 a new arrangement and interpretation of the original score was worked by Elena Kats-Chernin and commissioned for Barrie Kosky's Monteverdi Trilogy, conducted by André de Ridder, at the Komische Oper Berlin. This scoring was re-worked and premiered again in the same Kosky production in 2017. There are two versions of the Kats-Chernin composition, published by Boosey & Hawkes. A 2023 production was directed by NJ Agwuna and was set "in a world of tabloid headlines".

== Music ==
From the 1962 Glyndebourne production: Lucano, played by Hugues Cuénod, performs in his singing contest with Nerone (act 2, scene 6)

Written early in the history of opera, L'incoronazione di Poppea broke new ground in matching music to stage action, and in its musical reproductions of the natural inflections of the human voice. Monteverdi uses all the means for vocal expression available to a composer of his time—aria, arioso, arietta, ensemble, recitative—although Ringer comments that in this work the boundaries between these forms are more than usually porous. These elements are woven into a continuous fabric which ensures that the music always serves the drama, while maintaining a tonal and formal unity throughout. The characters have strong emotions, fears and desires which are reflected in their music. Thus Poppea's and Nerone's scenes are generally lyrical, sung mainly in the forms of arioso and aria, while Ottavia sings only in dramatic recitative. Seneca's music is bold and compelling, while Ottone's is hesitant and limited in range, "entirely inappropriate for anyone aspiring to be a man of action" according to Carter. Within this arrangement Monteverdi creates enough melodies to ensure that the opera is musically as well as dramatically memorable.

Monteverdi employs specific musical devices to signify moods and situations. For example, triple metre signifies the language of love for Nerone and Ottone (unfulfilled in the latter case); forceful arpeggios are used to represent conflict; and the interlacing of texts, written as separate verses by Busenello, indicates sexual tension in the scenes with Nerone and Poppea, and escalates the discord between Nerone and Seneca. The technique of "concitato genere"—rapid semiquavers sung on one note—is used to represent rage. Secret truths may be hinted at as, for example, when Seneca's friends plead with him to reconsider his suicide in a chromatic madrigal chorus which Monteverdi scholar Denis Arnold finds reminiscent of Monteverdi's Mantuan days, carrying a tragic power rarely seen in 17th century opera. This is followed, however, by a cheerful diatonic section by the same singers which, says Rosand, suggests a lack of real sympathy with Seneca's predicament. The descending tetrachord ostinato on which the final duet of the opera is built has been anticipated in the scene in which Nerone and Lucano celebrate Seneca's death, hinting at an ambivalence in the relationship between emperor and poet. According to Rosand: "in both cases it is surely the traditional association of that pattern with sexual love that is being evoked."

Arnold asserts that the music of L'incoronazione has greater variety than any other opera by Monteverdi, and that the purely solo music is intrinsically more interesting than that of Il ritorno. The musical peaks, according to commentators, include the final duet (despite its doubtful authorship), Ottavia's act 1 lament, Seneca's farewell and the ensuing madrigal, and the drunken Nerone–Lucano singing competition, often performed with strong homoerotic overtones. Ringer describes this scene as arguably the most brilliant in the whole opera, with "florid, synchronous coloratura by both men creating thrilling, virtuosic music that seems to compel the listener to share in their joy". Rosand finds Nerone's solo aria that closes the scene something of an anticlimax, after such stimulation.

Despite continuing debates about authorship, the work is almost always treated as Monteverdi's—although Rosand observes that some scholars attribute it to "Monteverdi" (in quotation marks). Ringer calls the opera "Monteverdi's last and arguably greatest work", a unified masterpiece of "unprecedented depth and individuality". Carter observes how Monteverdi's operas redefined the boundaries of theatrical music, and calls his contribution to 17th-century Venetian opera "remarkable by any standard". Harnoncourt reflects thus: "What is difficult to understand ... is the mental freshness with which the 74-year-old composer, two years before his death, was able to surpass his pupils in the most modern style and to set standards which were to apply to the music theatre of the succeeding centuries."

== List of musical items ==
The table uses the numberings from the 1656 printed version of Busenello's libretto, and includes the two act 2 scenes for which no music exists in the surviving scores. Typically, "scenes" comprise recitative, arioso, aria and ensemble elements, with occasional instrumental (sinfonia) passages. The boundaries between these elements are often indistinct; Denis Arnold, commenting on the musical continuity, writes that "with few exceptions it is impossible to extricate the arias and duets from the fabric of the opera".

Number	Performed by	Title (Note: Translations from Bardoni's 1989 English libretto. Bardoni did not translate "Liete e ridente" (act 2, scene IV) or "O come, o come, a tempo" (act 2, scene VII))	Notes
Prologue	Fortuna, Virtù, Amore	Deh, nasconditi, o Virtù (Pray hide thy face, O Virtue)	Preceded by a short instrumental sinfonia
Act 1; 1: Scene I	Ottone	E pur' io torno qui (And so I am drawn back)	
1: Scene II	Due soldati, Ottone	Chi parla? chi parla? (Who's speaking? Who's speaking?)	
1: Scene III	Poppea, Nerone	Signor, deh, non partire! (My lord, oh, do not go!)	
1: Scene IV	Poppea, Arnalta	Speranza, tu mi vai il cor accarezzando; (Hope, you continue to beguile my heart)	The Venice score (Vn) has a shorter version of Poppea's opening "Speranza, tu mi vai" than appears in the Naples score (Np) and in the libretto.
1: Scene V	Ottavia, Nutrice	Disprezzata Regina, Regina Disprezzata! (Despised queen, queen despised!)	
1: Scene VI	Seneca, Ottavia, Valletto	Ecco la sconsolata donna (Behold the grieving lady)	
1: Scene VII	Seneca	Le porpore regali e le grandezze (Royal purple and high estate)	
1: Scene VIII	Pallade, Seneca	Seneca, io miro in cielo infausti rai (Seneca, I see fateful signs in heaven)	
1: Scene IX	Nerone, Seneca	Son risoluto alfine, o Seneca, o maestro, (I have finally decided, O Seneca, O master)	
1: Scene X	Poppea, Nerone	Come dolci, Signor, come soavi (How sweet, my lord, how delicious)	
1: Scene XI	Ottone, Poppea	Ad altri tocca in sorte (Others are allowed to drink the wine)	Vn omits a final recitative from Ottone, and a sotto voce expression of sympathy for Ottone from Poppea's nurse Arnalta.
1: Scene XII	Ottone	Otton, torna in te stesso (Ottone, come to your senses)	
1: Scene XIII; End of act 1	Drusilla, Ottone	Pur sempre di Poppea, hor con la lingua, (Poppea is all you ever talk about)	
Act 2; 2: Scene I	Seneca, Mercurio	Solitudine amata, eremo della mente (Beloved solitude, mental sanctuary)	
2: Scene II	Liberto, Seneca	Il comando tiranno esclude ogni ragione (The tyrant's commands are quite irrational)	Vn omits additional lines for Liberto, and also the repeat of his "More felice!" (Die happy) salutation.
2: Scene III	Seneca, tre famigliari	Amici, è giunta l'hora (Friends, the hour has come)	Vn omits additional lines for Seneca after the Coro di Famigliari.
2: Scene IV	Seneca, coro di Virtú	Lieto, e ridente (Lightness and laughter)	Scene in Busenello's libretto, not in Vn or Np, in which a Chorus of Virtues welcomes Seneca to heaven.
2: Scene V	Valletto, Damigella	Sento un certo non so che (I feel a certain something)	Vn shortens the final duet for Valletto and Damigella.
2: Scene VI	Nerone, Lucano	Hor che Seneca è morto, cantiam (Now that Seneca is dead, let us sing)	The libretto allocates some Nerone/Lucano lines to the courtiers Petronio and Tigellino, neither of who figure in Vn or Np. Vn has a shorter version of the Nerone–Lucano duet and omits a stanza from Nerone's aria.
2: Scene VII	Nerone, Poppea	O come, O come a tempo (O how, how sometimes, my beloved ...)	Scene in Busenello's libretto, not in Vn or Np, in which Nerone and Poppea reiterate their love. Np replaces this scene with a solo for Ottavia.
2: Scene VIII	Ottone	I miei subiti sdegni (Did my rash anger ...)	The libretto adds five additional lines for Ottavia to the end of the scene, vowing vengeance on Poppea. Np extends this to 18 lines; neither version is included in Vn.
2: Scene IX	Ottavia, Ottone	Tu che dagli avi miei havesti le grandezze (You who were ennobled by my ancestors)	
2: Scene X	Drusilla, Valletto, Nutrice	Felice cor mio (O happy heart, rejoice!)	
2: Scene XI	Ottone, Drusilla	Io non so dov'io vada (I know not whither I am going)	
2: Scene XII	Poppea, Arnalta	Hor che Seneca è morto, Amor, ricorro a te (Now that Seneca is dead, Love I appeal to you)	
2: Scene XIII	Amore	Dorme l'incauta dorme (She sleeps, the unwary woman sleeps)	
2: Scene XIV; End of act 2	Ottone, Amore, Poppea, Arnalta	Eccomi transformato (Here I am, transformed)	The libretto has additional lines for Ottone, not in Vn or Np.
Act 3; 3: Scene I	Drusilla	O felice Drusilla, o che sper'io? (O happy Drusilla! Will my dreams come true?)	
3: Scene II	Arnalta, Littore, Drusilla	Ecco la scelerata (Behold the evil woman)	
3: Scene III	Arnalta, Nerone, Drusilla, Littore	Signor, ecco la rea (My lord, there is the criminal)	In Np, four lines of Drusilla's from scene IV are sung here. The lines remain, with different music, in scene IV in both Vn and Np, but appear only in scene IV in the libretto.
3: Scene IV	Ottone, Drusilla, Nerone	No, no, questa sentenza cada sopra di me (No, no! It is I who must be punished)	Littore has a line in the libretto and in Np, which is omitted in Vn.
3: Scene V	Poppea, Nerone	Signor, hoggi rinasco (My lord, today I am reborn)	
3: Scene VI	Arnalta	Hoggi sarà Poppea di Roma imperatrice (Poppea shall be Empress of Rome today)	The libretto transposes scenes VI and VII as they appear in Vn and Np, so that Ottavia's lament is heard first.
3: Scene VII	Ottavia	Addio, Roma! Addio, patria! amici, addio! (Farewell, Rome, my fatherland, my friends!)	
3: Scene VIII(a)	Nerone, Poppea,	Ascendi, o mia diletta (Ascend, O my beloved)	
3: Scene VIII(b)	Consoli, tribuni	A te, sovrano augusta (O august sovereign)	
3: Scene VIII(c)	Amore, Venere, coro di Amori	Madre, madre, sia con tua pace (Mother, forgive me for saying so)	The libretto and Np carry extended versions of this scene; the Coro di Amori does not appear in Vn.
3: Scene VIII(d) End of Opera	Nerone, Poppea	Pur ti miro, pur ti godo (I gaze at you, I possess you)	The text for this scene, included in both Vn and Np, does not appear in the published libretto. The words may have been written by composer-librettist Benedetto Ferrari; they appear in the libretto of his 1641 opera Il pastor regio.

== Recording history ==
The first recording of L'incoronazione, with Walter Goehr conducting the Tonhalle-Orchester Zürich in a live stage performance, was issued in 1954. This LP version, which won a Grand Prix du Disque in 1954, is the only recording of the opera that predates the revival of the piece that began with the 1962 Glyndebourne Festival production. In 1963 Herbert von Karajan and the Vienna Staatsoper issued a version described by Gramophone as "far from authentic", while the following year John Pritchard and the Royal Philharmonic Orchestra recorded an abridged version using Leppard's Glyndebourne orchestration. Leppard conducted a Sadler's Wells production, which was broadcast by the BBC and recorded on 27 November 1971. This is the only recording of the opera in English.

Nikolaus Harnoncourt's 1974 version, the first recording without cuts, used period instruments in an effort to achieve a more authentic sound, although Denis Arnold has criticised Harnoncourt's "over-ornamentation" of the score, particularly his use of oboe and trumpet flourishes. Arnold showed more enthusiasm for Alan Curtis's 1980 recording, live from La Fenice in Venice. Curtis uses a small band of strings, recorders and continuo, with a trumpets reserved for the final coronation scene. Subsequent recordings have tended to follow the path of authenticity, with versions from baroque specialists including Richard Hickox and the City of London Baroque Sinfonia (1988), René Jacobs and Concerto Vocale (1990), and John Eliot Gardiner with the English Baroque Soloists. Sergio Vartolo's production of the opera at Pigna, Corsica, was recorded for Brilliant Classics in 2004. A feature of this recording is the casting of a soprano Nerone in acts I and III, and a tenor Nerone in act II, to allow for the differing vocal requirements of the role in these acts. Vartolo accepts that "a staged performance would almost certainly require a different approach".

In more recent years, videotape and DVD versions have proliferated. The first was in 1979, a version directed by Harnoncourt with the Zürich Opera and chorus. Leppard's second Glyndebourne production, that of 1984, was released in DVD form in 2004. Since then, productions directed by Jacobs, Christophe Rousset and Marc Minkowski have all been released on DVD, along with Emmanuelle Haïm's 2008 Glyndebourne production in which the Festival finally rejects Leppard's big band version in favour of Haïm's period instruments, to give an experience closer to that of the original audience. The 2010 production at the Teatro Real in Madrid, conducted by William Christie, was released on DVD in 2012.

== Editions ==
Since the beginning of the 20th century the score of L'incoronazione has been edited frequently. Some editions, prepared for particular performances (e.g. Westrup's for the 1927 Oxford Town Hall performance) have not been published. The following are the main published editions since 1904. Years of publication often postdate the first performances from these editions.

- Hugo Goldschmidt (1904) Breitkopf & Härtel, Leipzig in Studien zur Geschichte der Italienischen Oper im 17 Jahrhundert)
- Vincent d'Indy (Paris, 1908)
- Gian Francesco Malipiero (Vienna, 1931 in Claudio Monteverdi: Tutte le opere)
- Ernst Krenek (Vienna, 1935)
- Giacomo Benvenuti (Milan, 1937)
- Giorgio Federico Ghedini (Milan, 1953)
- Hans Redlich (Kassel, 1958)
- Walter Goehr (Vienna and London, 1960)
- Raymond Leppard (London, 1966)
- Alan Curtis (London, 1989)
- René Jacobs (Cologne, 1990); supposed to restore 'Urfassung', uses Malipiero 1931 edition as framework, commissioned by WDR
- Hendrik Schulze (2017), Bärenreiter
