= List of musical items in Claudio Monteverdi's L'Orfeo =

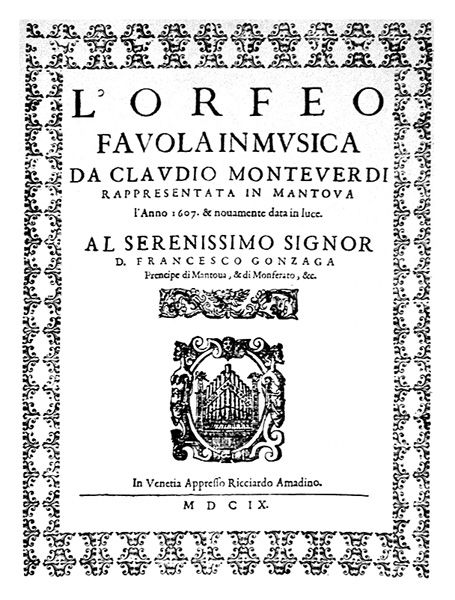
Front cover of the 1609 published score of L'Orfeo

The early baroque opera L'Orfeo, composed by Claudio Monteverdi to a libretto by Alessandro Striggio the Younger, was first performed in 1607. It is Monteverdi's first opera, and one of the earliest in the new genre. In Monteverdi's hands, according to music historian Donald Jay Grout, "the new form [of opera] passed out of the experimental stage, acquiring ... a power and depth of expression that makes his music dramas still living works after more than three hundred years". In his work, Monteverdi incorporates the "speech-song" or recitative first used in Jacopo Peri's opera Dafne and Giulio Caccini's Euridice, both direct precursors of L'Orfeo, and adds solo arias, duets, ensembles, dances and instrumental interludes.

The story of the opera follows the Greek legend of Orpheus, who descends to Hades to persuade the gods of the Underworld to allow him to bring his dead bride, Eurydice, back to the living world. His plea is granted, on the condition that he does not look back while leading Eurydice out of Hades. However, fearful that he is being betrayed, Orpheus does look back and Eurydice is lost to him for ever. In an ending which departs from the myth, Orpheus is rescued from his grief by Apollo, who invites him to ascend to the heavens where he will be able to look on Eurydice's semblance in the stars. Striggio's original ending, not preserved in the first published score of 1609, followed more closely to that of the myth, in which the grieving Orpheus is set upon by wild women (maenads or Bacchantes) and dismembered (though Striggio's version does not include the bloody denouement).

== Roles and voice types ==
Monteverdi's 1609 score includes an incomplete listing of the parts. Voice types are indicated by clef markings for each singer's part. These are generally interpretable in terms of soprano, alto, tenor and bass roles. Roles are frequently doubled, e.g. La musica and Eurydice, Ninfa and Prosperina, La messagera and Speranza, and others.

- La musica (Music) (soprano, originally castrato)
- Orfeo (Orpheus) (tenor)
- Euridice (Eurydice) (soprano, originally castrato)
- La messaggera (Silvia, the Messenger) (soprano)
- Speranza (Hope) (soprano)
- Caronte (Charon) (bass)
- Proserpina (Proserpine) (soprano)
- Plutone (Pluto) (bass)
- Apollo (tenor)
- Ninfa (Nymph) (soprano)
- Eco (Echo) (tenor)
- Ninfe e pastori (Nymphs and shepherds) (Chorus: soprano, alto, tenor, bass. Soloists: alto, two tenors)
- Spiriti infernali (Infernal spirits) (Chorus: soprano, alto, tenor, bass. Soloists: tenor, bass)

== List of musical and vocal items ==
Performer(s)	First lines	Notes
Orchestral ensemble	Toccata	Played three times
Prologue
La musica (Music)	Dal mio Parnasso amato a voi ne vegno ("From my beloved Parnassus I come to you")	A ritornello for strings plays at the beginning and ending of the prologue, and between its verses.
Act 1
Pastore secondo (Second shepherd)	In questo lieto e fortunato giorno ("On this gay, happy day")	
Coro di ninfi e pastori (Chorus of Nymphs and Shepherds)	Viena, Imenco, deh, vieni ("Come, Hymen, o come")	
Ninfa (Nymph)	Muse, onor di Parnasso, amor del cielo ("Ye Muses, the honour of Parnassus, the love of Heaven")	
Coro di ninfi e pastori	Lasciate i monti, lasciate i fonti ("Leave the mountains, leave the fountains")	In two sections, with an instrumental ritornello after each section
Pastore primo (First shepherd)	Ma tu, gentil cantor, s'a tuoi lamenti ("But thou, gentle singer, whose laments of love...")	
Orfeo (Orpheus)	Rosa del ciel, vita del mondo ("Rose of the heavens, life of the earth")	
Euridice (Eurydice)	Io non diro qual sia neltuo gioir ("I cannot say how great my bliss is.")	Followed by a reprise of choruses:; "Lasciate i monti" and ritornello; "Vieni, Imeneo" and ritornello
Pastori primo, secondo, terzo e quarto, ninfa (First, second, third and fourth shepherds, and nymph)	Ma se il nostro gioir dal ciel deriva ("But if our rejoicing comes from Heaven")	With ritornelli
Coro di ninfi e pastori	Ecco Orfeo, cui pur dianzi ("Here is Orpheus, for whom sighs were food")	
Act 2
Orchestra	Sinfonia	
Orfeo, pastori secondo e terzo	Ecco pur ch'a voi ritorno ("Behold I return to you")	Sections interspersed with ritornelli
Coro di ninfi e pastori	Dunque fa' degni, Orfeo ("Then, Orpheus, make worthy")	Followed by ritornello
Orfeo	Vi ricorda, o boschi ombrosi ("Do you remember, o shady woods")	Sections interspersed with ritornelli
Pastore secondo	Mira, deh mira, Orfeo, che d'ogni intorno ("Look, Orpheus, o lookhow on all sides...")	
La messaggera, Pastore primo, secondo e terzo, Orfeo	Ahi, caso acerbo, ahi, fato empio e crudele ("Ah, bitter happening, ah impious and cruel fate")	
La messaggera	In un fiorito prato ("In a flowery meadow")	
Pastori secondo e terzo	Ahi, caso acerbo, ahi, fato empio e crudele ("Ah, bitter happening, ah impious and cruel fate")	
Orfeo	Tu se' morta, mia vita, ed io respiro? ("Thou art dead, my love, and I am breathing?")	
Coro di ninfi e pastori	Ahi, caso acerbo, ahi, fato empio e crudele ("Ah, bitter happening, ah impious and cruel fate")	
La messaggera	Ma io, che in questo lingua ("But I, who with this tongue...")	
Orchestra	Sinfonia	
Pastore secondo e terzo	Chi ni consola, ahi lassi? ("Who shall console us unhappy ones?")	
Coro di ninfi e pastori	Ahi, caso acerbo, ahi, fato empio e crudele ("Ah, bitter happening, ah impious and cruel fate")	
Pastore secondo e terzo	Ma dove, ah dove or sono ("But where, o where is now...")	
Coro di ninfi e pastori	Ahi, caso acerbo, ahi, fato empio e crudele ("Ah, bitter happening, ah impious and cruel fate")	Act ends with ritornello (La musica)
Act 3
Orchestra	Sinfonia (Underworld)	
Orfeo	Scorto da te, mio nume ("Escorted by thee, my Goddess")	
La speranza (Hope)	Ecco l'atra palude, ecco il nocchiero ("Here is the desolate swamp, here is the boatman")	
Orfeo	Dove, ah, dove ten'vai ("Wither, o wither dost thou go?")	
Caronte (Charon)	O tu ch'innanzi morte a queste rive ("O thou who darest before death...")	
Orchestra	Sinfonia (Underworld): reprise	
Orfeo	Possente spirto e formidabil nume ("Mighty spirit and powerful divinity")	With ritornelli
Caronte	Ben mi lusinga alquanto ("Much I am flattered")	
Orfeo	Ahi, sventurato amante ("Ah, unhappy lover that I am")	In two sections; the Underworld sinfonia plays at the end of each section
Coro di spiriti (Chorus of spirits)	Nulla impresa per uom si tenta invano ("Nothing is undertaken by man in vain")	Act concludes with further reprise of Underworld sinfonia.
Act 4
Proserpina (Proserpine)	Signor, quell'infelice ("My lord, this unhappy one...")	
Plutone (Pluto)	Benché severo ed immutabil fato ("Although stern and immutable fate...")	
Spiriti primo e secondo (First and second spirits)	O de gli abitator del'ombre eterne (2O mighty king of the eternal world of shadows")	
Proserpina, Plutone, spirito primo e coro di spiriti	Quali grazie ti rendo ("How shall I ever than thee...")	Followed by ritornello
Orfeo, spirito terzo (Third spirit)	Quale onor de te fia degno ("What honour is worthy of thee")	Interspersed with two ritornelli
Euridice, spirito primo	Ahi, vista troppo dolce e troppo amara ("Ah, sight too sweet and too bitter")	
Orfeo	Dove ten'vai mia vita? ("Whither goest thou, my life?")	Followed by Underworld sinfonia
Coro di spiriti	E la virtute un raggio di celeste bellezza ("Virtue is a ray of heavenly beauty")	Followed by Underworld sinfonia
Act 5
Orfeo, Eco (Echo)	Questi i campi di Tracia, e quest'e il loca ("These are the fields of Thrace, and this is the place...")	Preceded by ritornello (La musica)
Orfeo	S'hai del mio mal pietade io ti ringrazio ("If thou has pity for me in my suffering, I thank thee")	Followed by ritornello
Apollo, Orfeo	Perchè a lo sdegno ed al dolor in preda ("Why dost thou give thyself up as prey...")	Followed by ritonello
Coro di pastori	Vanne Orfeo, felice appieno ("Go, Orpheus, completely happy")	Followed by ritornello
Orchestra	Moresca (Moorish dance)	End of opera
End of opera
Original version of act 5, per 1607 libretto
Orfeo, Eco (Echo)	Questi i campi di Tracia, e quest'e il loca ("These are the fields of Thrace, nd this is the place...")	Preceded by ritornello (La musica)
Orfeo	S'hai del mio mal pietade io ti ringrazio ("If thou has pity for me in my suffering, I thank thee")	Followed by ritornello
Coto di Baccanti (Chorus of Bacchantes)	Evohe padre Lieo, Bassareo ("Hail, Father Lyaeus, Bacchus!")	
Due Baccanti	Fuggito è pur da questa destra ultrice ("Flown from this avenging arm...")	
Coro di Baccanti, due Baccanti	Evohe padre Lieo, Bassareo ("Hail, Father Lyaeus, Bacchus!")	Chorus repeated three times after soloist passages

== Sources ==
- Carter, Tim (2002). Monteverdi's Musical Theatre. New Haven: Yale University Press. ISBN 0-300-09676-3.
- Grout, Donald Jay (1971). A Short History of Opera. New York: Columbia University Press. ISBN 0-231-08978-3.
- Grout, Donald Jay and Palisca, P.V. (1981). A History of Western Music Third Edition. London: J.M. Dent. ISBN 0-460-04546-6.
- Harnoncourt, Nikolaus (1969). "Claudio Monteverdi's L'Orfeo: An Introduction" (in notes accompanying Teldec recording 8.35020 ZA). Hamburg: Teldec Schallplatten GmbH.
- Sternfeld, Frederick William (1986). "The Orpheus myth and the libretto of Orfeo". In Whenham, John (ed.). Claudio Monteverdi: Orfeo. London: Cambridge University Press. ISBN 0-521-24148-0.
- Whenham, John (1986). "Five acts, one action". Claudio Monteverdi: Orfeo. London: Cambridge University Press. ISBN 0-521-24148-0.
