= L'Orfeo =

Opera by Claudio Monteverdi

- Favola in musica by Claudio Monteverdi
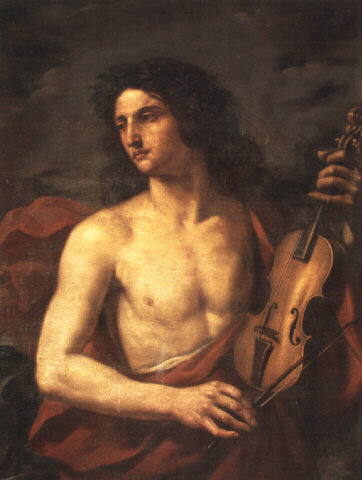
- Orpheus, the hero of the opera
- Librettist: Alessandro Striggio
- Language: Italian
- Based on: Greek legend of Orpheus
- Premiere: 1607 Carnival season Mantua

L'Orfeo (SV 318) (Italian pronunciation: [lorˈfɛːo]), or La favola d'Orfeo [la ˈfaːvola dorˈfɛːo], is a late Renaissance/early Baroque favola in musica, or opera, by Claudio Monteverdi, with a libretto by Alessandro Striggio. It is based on the Greek legend of Orpheus, and tells the story of his descent to Hades and his fruitless attempt to bring his dead bride Eurydice back to the living world. It was written in 1607 for a court performance during the annual Carnival at Mantua. While Jacopo Peri's Dafne is generally recognised as the first work in the opera genre, and the earliest surviving opera is Peri's Euridice, L'Orfeo is the earliest that is still regularly performed.

By the early 17th century the traditional intermedio—a musical sequence between the acts of a straight play—was evolving into the form of a complete musical drama or "opera". Monteverdi's L'Orfeo moved this process out of its experimental era and provided the first fully developed example of the new genre. After its initial performance the work was staged again in Mantua, and possibly in other Italian centres in the next few years. Its score was published by Monteverdi in 1609 and again in 1615. After the composer's death in 1643 the opera went unperformed for many years, and was largely forgotten until a revival of interest in the late 19th century led to a spate of modern editions and performances. At first these performances tended to be concert (unstaged) versions within institutes and music societies, but following the first modern dramatised performance in Paris, in 1911, the work began to be seen in theatres. After the Second World War many recordings were issued, and the opera was increasingly staged in opera houses, although some leading venues resisted it. In 2007, the quatercentenary of the premiere was celebrated by performances throughout the world.

In his published score Monteverdi lists around 41 instruments to be deployed, with distinct groups of instruments used to depict particular scenes and characters. Thus strings, harpsichords, and recorders represent the pastoral fields of Thrace with their nymphs and shepherds, while heavy brass illustrates the underworld and its denizens. Composed at the point of transition from the Renaissance era to the Baroque, L'Orfeo employs all the resources then known within the art of music, with particularly daring use of polyphony. The work is not orchestrated as such; in the Renaissance tradition instrumentalists followed the composer's general instructions but were given considerable freedom to improvise.

== Historical background ==
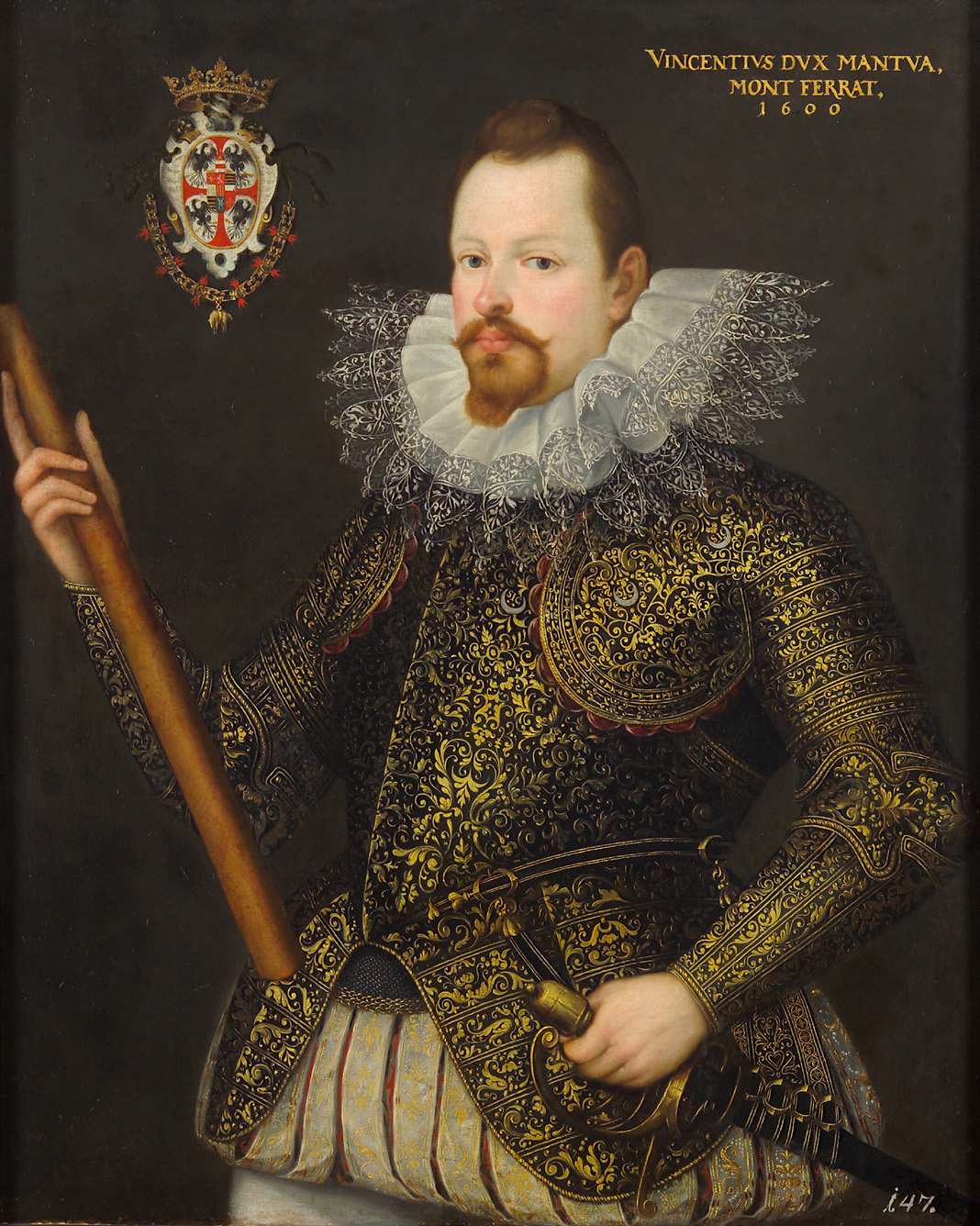
Duke Vincenzo Gonzaga, Monteverdi's employer at Mantua

Claudio Monteverdi, born in Cremona in 1567, was a musical prodigy who studied under Marc'Antonio Ingegneri, the maestro di cappella (head of music) at Cremona Cathedral. After training in singing, string playing and composition, Monteverdi worked as a musician in Verona and Milan until, in 1590 or 1591, he secured a post as suonatore di vivuola (viola player) at Duke Vincenzo Gonzaga's court at Mantua. Through ability and hard work Monteverdi rose to become Gonzaga's maestro della musica (master of music) in 1601.

Vincenzo Gonzaga's particular passion for musical theatre and spectacle grew from his family connections with the court of Florence. Towards the end of the 16th century innovative Florentine musicians were developing the intermedio—a long-established form of musical interlude inserted between the acts of spoken dramas—into increasingly elaborate forms. Led by Jacopo Corsi, these successors to the renowned Camerata (Note: The Florentine Camerata, led by Giovanni de' Bardi, was a group of scholars and musicians dedicated to the revival of Ancient Greek-style theatre, mainly active in the 1570s and 1580s. Later groups with similar aims are also loosely referred to as "Camerata".) were responsible for the first work generally recognised as belonging to the genre of opera: Dafne, composed by Corsi and Jacopo Peri and performed in Florence in 1598. This work combined elements of madrigal singing and monody with dancing and instrumental passages to form a dramatic whole. Only fragments of its music still exist, but several other Florentine works of the same period—Rappresentatione di Anima, et di Corpo by Emilio de' Cavalieri, Peri's Euridice and Giulio Caccini's identically titled Euridice—survive complete. These last two works were the first of many musical representations of the Orpheus myth as recounted in Ovid's Metamorphoses, and as such were direct precursors of Monteverdi's L'Orfeo.

The Gonzaga court had a long history of promoting dramatic entertainment. A century before Duke Vincenzo's time the court had staged Angelo Poliziano's lyrical drama La favola di Orfeo, at least half of which was sung rather than spoken. More recently, in 1598 Monteverdi had helped the court's musical establishment produce Giovanni Battista Guarini's play Il pastor fido, described by theatre historian Mark Ringer as a "watershed theatrical work" which inspired the Italian craze for pastoral drama. On 6 October 1600, while visiting Florence for the wedding of Maria de' Medici to King Henry IV of France, Duke Vincenzo attended the premiere of Peri's Euridice. It is likely that his principal musicians, including Monteverdi, were also present at this performance. The Duke quickly recognised the novelty of this new form of dramatic entertainment, and its potential for bringing prestige to those prepared to sponsor it.

== Creation ==
=== Libretto ===
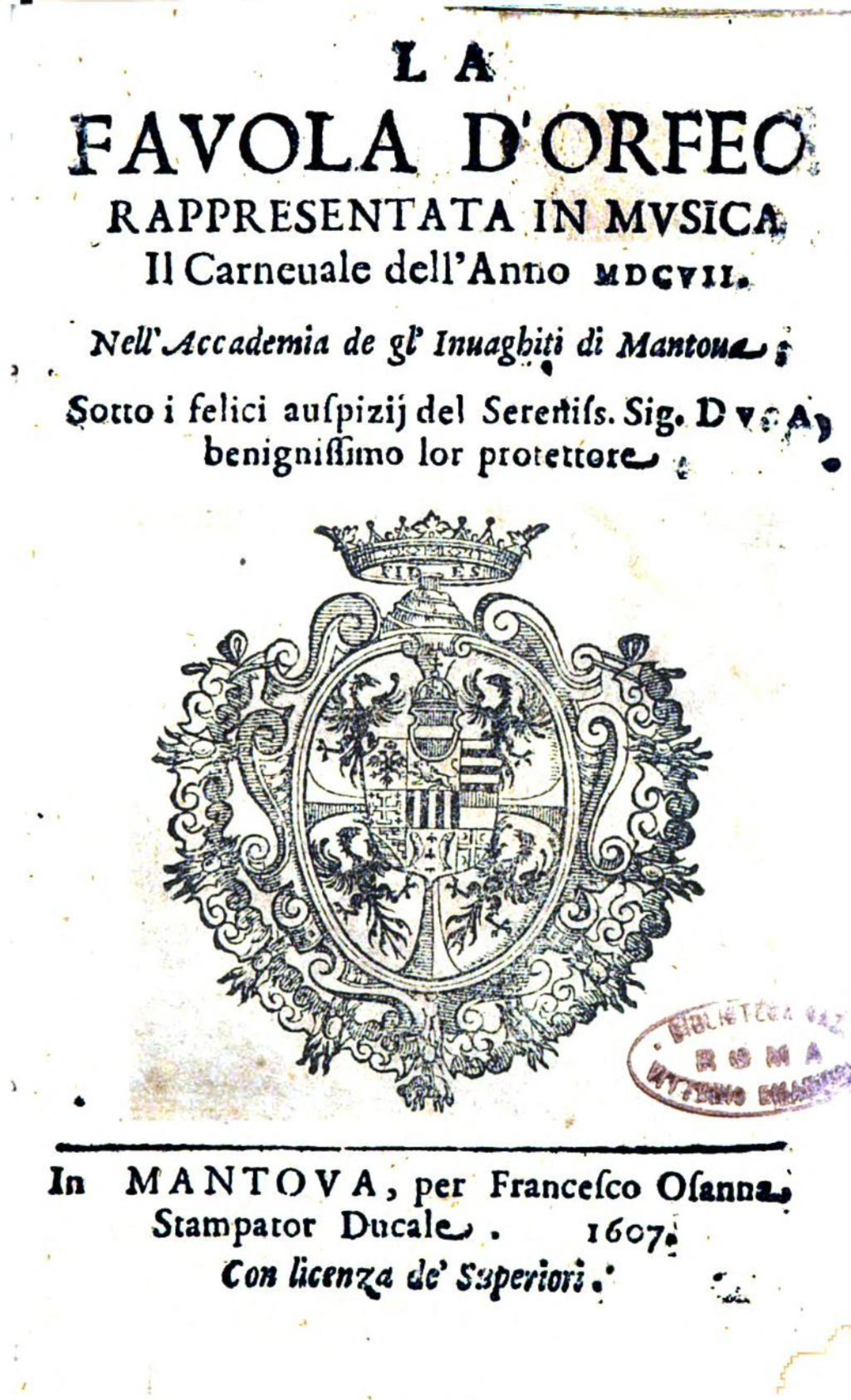
Title page of the 1607 libretto

Among those present at the Euridice performance in October 1600 was a young lawyer and career diplomat from Gonzaga's court, Alessandro Striggio, son of a well-known composer of the same name. The younger Striggio was himself a talented musician; as a 16-year-old, he had played the viol at the wedding festivities of Duke Ferdinando of Tuscany in 1589. Together with Duke Vincent's two young sons, Francesco and Fernandino, he was a member of Mantua's exclusive intellectual society, the Accademia degli Invaghiti, which provided the chief outlet for the city's theatrical works. It is not clear at what point Striggio began his libretto for L'Orfeo, but work was evidently under way in January 1607. In a letter written on 5 January, Francesco Gonzaga asks his brother, then attached to the Florentine court, to obtain the services of a high quality castrato from the Grand Duke's establishment, for a "play in music" being prepared for the Mantuan Carnival.

Striggio's main sources for his libretto were Books 10 and 11 of Ovid's Metamorphoses and Book Four of Virgil's Georgics. These provided him with the basic material, but not the structure for a staged drama; the events of acts 1 and 2 of the libretto are covered by a mere 13 lines in the Metamorphoses. For help in creating a dramatic form, Striggio drew on other sources—Poliziano's 1480 play, Guarini's Il pastor fido, and Ottavio Rinuccini's libretto for Peri's Euridice. The musicologist Gary Tomlinson remarks on the many similarities between Striggio's and Rinuccini's texts, noting that some of the speeches in L'Orfeo "correspond closely in content and even in locution to their counterparts in L'Euridice". The critic Barbara Russano Hanning writes that Striggio's verses are less subtle than those of Rinuccini, although the structure of Striggio's libretto is more interesting. Rinuccini, whose work had been written for the festivities accompanying a Medici wedding, was obliged to alter the myth to provide a "happy ending" suitable for the occasion. By contrast, because Striggio was not writing for a formal court celebration he could be more faithful to the spirit of the myth's conclusion, in which Orfeo is killed and dismembered by deranged maenads or "Bacchantes". He chose, in fact, to write a somewhat muted version of this bloody finale, in which the Bacchantes threaten Orfeo's destruction but his actual fate is left in doubt.

The libretto was published in Mantua in 1607 to coincide with the premiere and incorporated Striggio's ambiguous ending. However, Monteverdi's score published in Venice in 1609 by Ricciardo Amadino shows an entirely different resolution, with Orpheus transported to the heavens through the intervention of Apollo. According to Ringer, Striggio's original ending was almost certainly used at the opera's premiere, but there is no doubt that Monteverdi believed the revised ending was aesthetically correct. The musicologist Nino Pirrotta argues that the Apollo ending was part of the original plan for the work, but was not staged at the premiere because the small room which hosted the event could not contain the theatrical machinery that this ending required. The Bacchantes scene was a substitution; Monteverdi's intentions were restored when this constraint was removed.

=== Composition ===
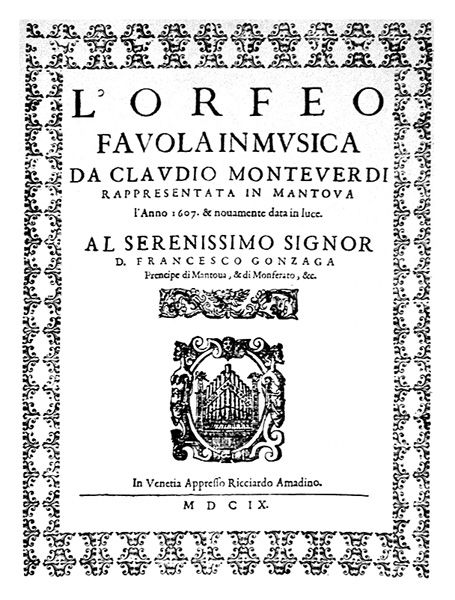
Front cover of the score of L'Orfeo, published in Venice in 1609

When Monteverdi composed L'Orfeo he had a thorough grounding in theatrical music. He had been employed at the Gonzaga court for 16 years, much of it as a performer or arranger of stage music, and in 1604 he had written the ballo Gli amori di Diane ed Endimone for the 1604–05 Mantua Carnival. The elements from which Monteverdi constructed his first opera score—the aria, the strophic song, recitative, choruses, dances, dramatic musical interludes—were, as conductor Nikolaus Harnoncourt has pointed out, not created by him, but "he blended the entire stock of newest and older possibilities into a unity that was indeed new". Musicologist Robert Donington writes similarly: "[The score] contains no element which was not based on precedent, but it reaches complete maturity in that recently developed form ... Here are words as directly expressed in music as [the pioneers of opera] wanted them expressed; here is music expressing them ... with the full inspiration of genius."

Monteverdi states the orchestral requirements at the beginning of his published score, but in accordance with the practice of the day he does not specify their exact usage. At that time it was usual to allow each interpreter of the work freedom to make local decisions, based on the orchestral forces at their disposal. These could differ sharply from place to place. Furthermore, as Harnoncourt points out, the instrumentalists would all have been composers and would have expected to collaborate creatively at each performance, rather than playing a set text. Another practice of the time was to allow singers to embellish their arias. Monteverdi wrote plain and embellished versions of some arias, such as Orfeo's "Possente spirto", but according to Harnoncourt "it is obvious that where he did not write any embellishments he did not want any sung".

Each act of the opera deals with a single element of the story, and each ends with a chorus. Despite the five-act structure, with two sets of scene changes, it is likely that L'Orfeo conformed to the standard practice for court entertainments of that time and was played as a continuous entity, without intervals or curtain descents between acts. It was the contemporary custom for scene shifts to take place in sight of the audience, these changes being reflected musically by changes in instrumentation, key and style.

=== Instrumentation ===
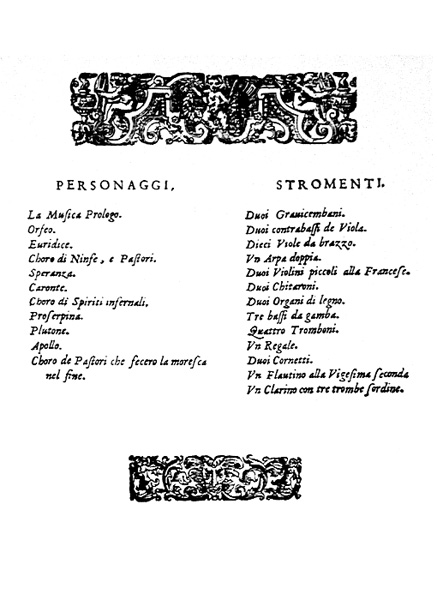
1609 score: Monteverdi's listing of instruments is shown on the right.

For the purpose of analysis the music scholar Jane Glover has divided Monteverdi's list of instruments into three main groups: strings, brass and continuo, with a few further items not easily classifiable. The strings grouping is formed from ten members of the violin family (viole da brazzo), two double basses (contrabassi de viola), and two kit violins (violini piccoli alla francese). The viole da brazzo are in two five-part ensembles, each comprising two violins, two violas and a cello. The brass group contains four or five trombones (sackbuts), three or four trumpets and two cornetts. The continuo forces include two harpsichords (duoi gravicembani), a double harp (arpa doppia), three chitarroni, two pipe organs (organi di legno), three bass viola da gamba, and a regal or small reed organ. Outside of these groupings are two recorders (flautini alla vigesima secunda), and possibly one or more citterns—unlisted by Monteverdi, but included in instructions relating to the end of act 4.

Instrumentally, the two worlds represented within the opera are distinctively portrayed. The pastoral world of the fields of Thrace is represented by the strings, harpsichords, harp, organs, recorders and chitarroni. The remaining instruments, mainly brass, are associated with the Underworld, though there is not an absolute distinction; strings appear on several occasions in the Hades scenes. Within this general ordering, specific instruments or combinations are used to accompany some of the main characters—Orpheus by harp and organ, shepherds by harpsichord and chitarrone, the Underworld gods by trombones and regal. All of these musical distinctions and characterisations were in accordance with the longstanding traditions of the Renaissance orchestra, of which the large L'Orfeo ensemble is typical.

Monteverdi instructs his players generally to "[play] the work as simply and correctly as possible, and not with many florid passages or runs". Those playing ornamentation instruments such as strings and flutes are advised to "play nobly, with much invention and variety", but are warned against overdoing it, whereby "nothing is heard but chaos and confusion, offensive to the listener". Since at no time are all the instruments played together, the number of players needed is less than the number of instruments. Harnoncourt indicates that in Monteverdi's day the numbers of players and singers together, and the small rooms in which performances were held, often meant that the audience barely numbered more than the performers.

Three of the instruments used in the original performance of L'Orfeo have had recent revivals: the cornetto (usually paired with sackbuts), the double harp (a multi-course harp with sharps and flats) and the regal (an organ with fractional-length reed pipes). Instrumental color was widely used in specific dramatic situations during the 17c: in particular the regal was associated with Hades.

== Roles ==
In his personaggi listed in the 1609 score, Monteverdi unaccountably omits La messaggera (the Messenger), and indicates that the final chorus of shepherds who perform the moresca (Moorish dance) at the opera's end are a separate group (che fecero la moresca nel fine). Little information is available about who sang the various roles in the first performance. A letter published at Mantua in 1612 records that the distinguished tenor and composer Francesco Rasi took part, and it is generally assumed that he sang the title role. Rasi could sing in both the tenor and bass ranges "with exquisite style ... and extraordinary feeling". The involvement in the premiere of a Florentine castrato, Giovanni Gualberto Magli, is confirmed by correspondence between the Gonzaga princes. Magli sang the prologue, Proserpina and possibly one other role, either La messaggera or Speranza. The musicologist and historian Hans Redlich mistakenly allocates Magli to the role of Orfeo.

A clue about who played Euridice is contained in a 1608 letter to Duke Vincenzo. It refers to "that little priest who performed the role of Euridice in the Most Serene Prince's Orfeo". This priest was possibly Padre Girolamo Bacchini, a castrato known to have had connections to the Mantuan court in the early 17th century. The Monteverdi scholar Tim Carter speculates that two prominent Mantuan tenors, Pandolfo Grande and Francesco Campagnola may have sung minor roles in the premiere.

There are solo parts for four shepherds and three spirits. Carter calculates that through the doubling of roles that the text allows, a total of ten singers—three sopranos, two altos, three tenors and two basses—is required for a performance, with the soloists (except Orfeo) also forming the chorus. Carter's suggested role-doublings include La musica with Euridice, Ninfa with Proserpina and La messaggera with Speranza.

Role	Voice type (Note: Monteverdi's 1609 score does not specify voice parts, but indicates the required ranges by clef. In the early productions the principal "high voice" parts were sung by castrati. Modern productions have generally allocated the parts to soprano, alto, tenor and bass singers. See Carter 2002, pp. 91–97, Glover 1986, pp. 146–148.)	Appearances	Notes
La Musica (Music)	mezzo-soprano castrato (en travesti)	Prologue	
Orfeo (Orpheus)	tenor or high baritone	Act 1, 2, 3, 4, 5	
Euridice (Eurydice)	mezzo-soprano castrato (en travesti)	Act 1, 4	
La messaggera (The Messenger)	mezzo-soprano castrato (en travesti)	Act 2	Named in the libretto as "Silvia"
La Speranza (Hope)	mezzo-soprano castrato (en travesti)	Act 3	
Caronte (Charon)	bass	Act 3	
Proserpina	mezzo-soprano castrato (en travesti)	Act 4	
Plutone (Pluto)	bass	Act 4	
Apollo	tenor	Act 5	
Ninfa (Nymph)	mezzo-soprano castrato (en travesti)	Act 1	
Eco (Echo)	tenor	Act 5	
Ninfe e pastori (Nymphs and shepherds)	mezzo-soprano castratos (en travesti), alto castratos (en travesti), tenors, basses	Act 1, 2, 5	Soloists: alto castrato (en travesti), two tenors
Spiriti infernali (Infernal spirits)	tenors, basses	Act 3, 4	Soloists: two tenors, one bass

== Synopsis ==
The action takes place in two contrasting locations: the fields of Thrace (acts 1, 2 and 5) and the Underworld (acts 3 and 4). An instrumental toccata (English: "tucket", meaning a flourish on trumpets) precedes the entrance of La musica, representing the "spirit of music", who sings a prologue of five stanzas of verse. After a gracious welcome to the audience she announces that she can, through sweet sounds, "calm every troubled heart". She sings a further paean to the power of music, before introducing the drama's main protagonist, Orfeo, who "held the wild beasts spellbound with his song". (Note: English translations quoted in the synopsis are from the version accompanying Nikolaus Harnoncourt's 1969 recording.)

=== Act 1 ===
After La musica's final request for silence, the curtain rises on act 1 to reveal a pastoral scene. Orfeo and Euridice enter together with a chorus of nymphs and shepherds, who act in the manner of a Greek chorus, commenting on the action both as a group and as individuals. A shepherd announces that this is the couple's wedding day; the chorus responds, first in a stately invocation ("Come, Hymen, O come") and then in a joyful dance ("Leave the mountains, leave the fountains"). Orfeo and Euridice sing of their love for each other before leaving with most of the group for the wedding ceremony in the temple. Those left on stage sing a brief chorus, commenting on how Orfeo used to be one "for whom sighs were food and weeping was drink" before love brought him to a state of sublime happiness.

=== Act 2 ===
Orfeo returns with the main chorus, and sings with them of the beauties of nature. Orfeo then muses on his former unhappiness, but proclaims: "After grief one is more content, after pain one is happier". The mood of contentment is abruptly ended when La messaggera enters, bringing the news that, while gathering flowers, Euridice has received a fatal snakebite. The chorus expresses its anguish: "Ah, bitter happening, ah, impious and cruel fate!", while the Messaggera castigates herself as the bearer of bad tidings ("For ever I will flee, and in a lonely cavern lead a life in keeping with my sorrow"). Orfeo, after venting his grief and incredulity ("Thou art dead, my life, and I am breathing?"), declares his intention to descend into the Underworld and persuade its ruler to allow Euridice to return to life. Otherwise, he says, "I shall remain with thee in the company of death". He departs, and the chorus resumes its lament.

=== Act 3 ===
Orfeo is guided by Speranza to the gates of Hades. Having pointed out the words inscribed on the gate ("Abandon all hope, ye who enter here"), (Note: The pun (Speranza means "hope") in this quotation from Inferno by Dante Alighieri can be considered, according to John Whenham, as a "learned witticism" on Striggio's part.) Speranza leaves. Orfeo is now confronted with the ferryman Caronte, who addresses Orfeo harshly and refuses to take him across the river Styx. Orfeo attempts to persuade Caronte by singing a flattering song to him ("Mighty spirit and powerful divinity"), and, although the ferryman is moved by his music ("Indeed thou charmest me, appeasing my heart"), he does not allow him to pass, claiming he is incapable of feeling pity. However, when Orfeo takes up his lyre and plays, Caronte is soothed into sleep. Seizing his chance, Orfeo steals the ferryman's boat and crosses the river, entering the Underworld while a chorus of spirits reflects that nature cannot defend herself against man: "He has tamed the sea with fragile wood, and disdained the rage of the winds."

=== Act 4 ===
In the Underworld, Proserpina, Queen of Hades, who has been deeply affected by Orfeo's singing, petitions King Plutone, her husband, for Euridice's release. Moved by her pleas, Plutone agrees on the condition that, as he leads Euridice towards the world, Orfeo must not look back. If he does, "a single glance will condemn him to eternal loss". Orfeo enters, leading Euridice and singing confidently that on that day he will rest on his wife's white bosom. But as he sings a note of doubt creeps in: "Who will assure me that she is following?". Perhaps, he thinks, Plutone, driven by envy, has imposed the condition through spite? Suddenly distracted by an off-stage commotion, Orfeo looks round; immediately, the image of Euridice begins to fade. She sings, despairingly: "Losest thou me through too much love?" and disappears. Orfeo attempts to follow her but is drawn away by an unseen force. The chorus of spirits sings that Orfeo, having overcome Hades, was in turn overcome by his passions.

=== Act 5 ===
Back in the fields of Thrace, Orfeo has a long soliloquy in which he laments his loss, praises Euridice's beauty and resolves that his heart will never again be pierced by Cupid's arrow. An off-stage echo repeats his final phrases. Suddenly, in a cloud, Apollo descends from the heavens and chastises him: "Why dost thou give thyself up as prey to rage and grief?" He invites Orfeo to leave the world and join him in the heavens, where he will recognise Euridice's likeness in the stars. Orfeo replies that it would be unworthy not to follow the counsel of such a wise father, and together they ascend. A shepherds' chorus concludes that "he who sows in suffering shall reap the fruit of every grace", before the opera ends with a vigorous moresca.

=== Original libretto ending ===
In Striggio's 1607 libretto, Orfeo's act 5 soliloquy is interrupted, not by Apollo's appearance but by a chorus of maenads or Bacchantes—wild, drunken women—who sing of the "divine fury" of their master, the god Bacchus. The cause of their wrath is Orfeo and his renunciation of women; he will not escape their heavenly anger, and the longer he evades them the more severe his fate will be. Orfeo leaves the scene and his destiny is left uncertain, as the Bacchantes devote themselves for the rest of the opera to wild singing and dancing in praise of Bacchus. The early music authority Claude Palisca believes that the two endings are not incompatible; Orfeo might evade the fury of the Bacchantes and be rescued by Apollo. However, this alternative ending in any case nearer to original classic myth, where the Bacchantes also appear, but it is made explicit that they torture him to his death, followed by reunion as a shade with Euridice but no apotheosis nor any interaction with Apollo.

== Reception and performance history ==
=== Premiere and early performances ===
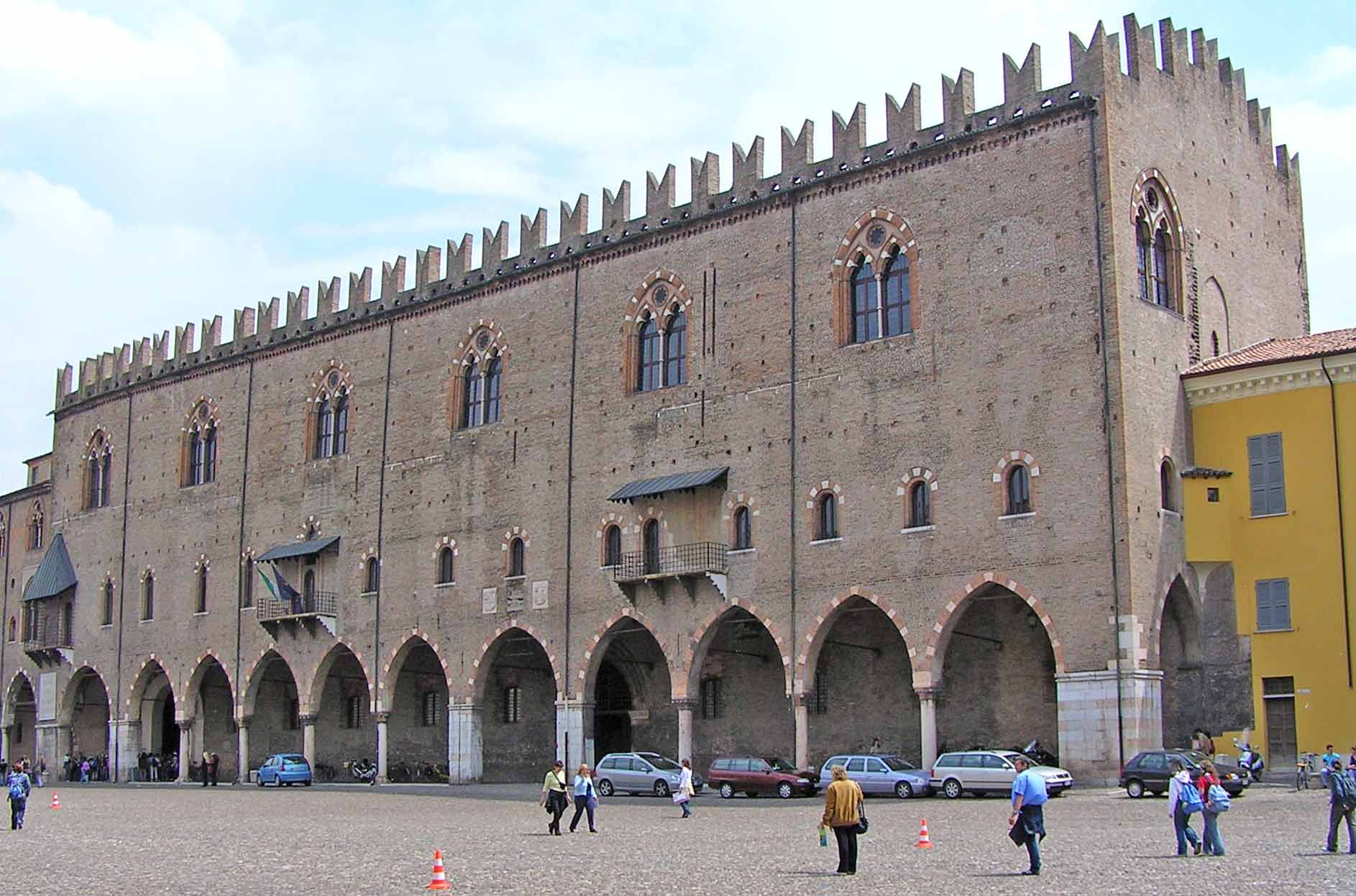
The Ducal Palace at Mantua, where L'Orfeo was premiered in 1607

The date for the first performance of L'Orfeo, 24 February 1607, is evidenced by two letters, both dated 23 February. In the first, Francesco Gonzaga informs his brother that the "musical play" will be performed tomorrow; it is clear from earlier correspondence that this refers to L'Orfeo. The second letter is from a Gonzaga court official, Carlo Magno, and gives more details: "Tomorrow evening the Most Serene Lord the Prince is to sponsor a [play] in a room in the apartments which the Most Serene Lady had the use of ...it should be most unusual, as all the actors are to sing their parts." The "Serene Lady" is Duke Vincenzo's widowed sister Margherita Gonzaga d'Este, who lived within the Ducal Palace. The room of the premiere cannot be identified with certainty; according to Ringer, it may have been the Galleria dei Fiumi, which has the dimensions to accommodate a stage and orchestra with space for a small audience.

There is no detailed account of the premiere, although Francesco wrote on 1 March that the work had "been to the great satisfaction of all who heard it", and had particularly pleased the Duke. The Mantuan court theologian and poet, Cherubino Ferrari wrote that: "Both poet and musician have depicted the inclinations of the heart so skilfully that it could not have been done better ... The music, observing due propriety, serves the poetry so well that nothing more beautiful is to be heard anywhere". After the premiere Duke Vincenzo ordered a second performance for 1 March; a third performance was planned to coincide with a proposed state visit to Mantua by the Duke of Savoy. Francesco wrote to the Duke of Tuscany on 8 March, asking if he could retain the services of the castrato Magli for a little longer. However, the visit was cancelled, as was the celebratory performance.

There are suggestions that in the years following the premiere, L'Orfeo may have been staged in Florence, Cremona, Milan and Turin, though firmer evidence suggests that the work attracted limited interest beyond the Mantuan court. Francesco may have mounted a production in Casale Monferrato, where he was governor, for the 1609–10 Carnival, and there are indications that the work was performed on several occasions in Salzburg between 1614 and 1619, under the direction of Francesco Rasi. Years later, during the first flourish of Venetian opera in 1637–43, Monteverdi chose to revive his second opera, L'Arianna there, but not L'Orfeo. There is some evidence of a performance shortly after Monteverdi's death in Geneva in 1643. Although according to Carter the work was still admired across Italy in the 1650s, it was subsequently forgotten, as largely was Monteverdi, until the revival of interest in his works in the late 19th century.

=== 20th-century revivals ===
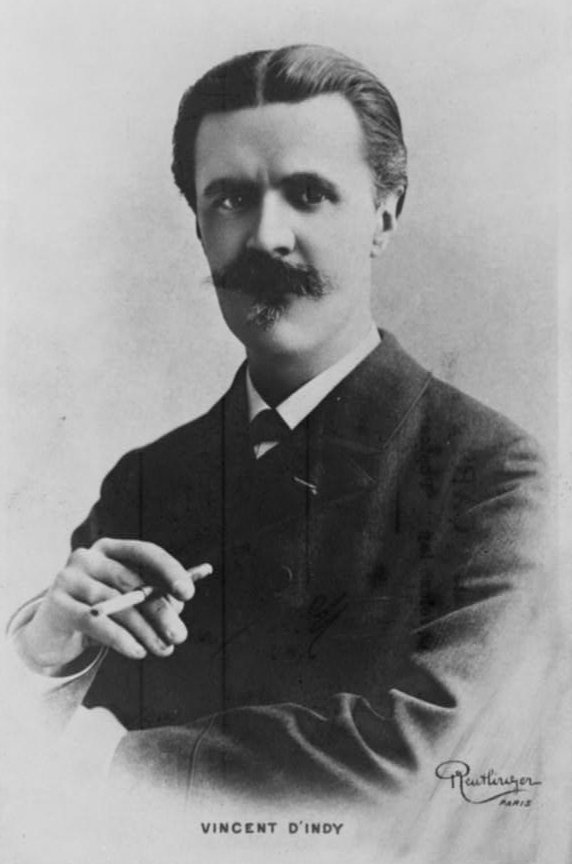
Vincent d'Indy, who oversaw the first 20th-century revival of L'Orfeo in 1904

After years of neglect, Monteverdi's music began to attract the interest of pioneer music historians in the late 18th and early 19th centuries, and from the second quarter of the 19th century onwards he is discussed increasingly in scholarly works. In 1881 a truncated version of the L'Orfeo score, intended for study rather than performance, was published in Berlin by Robert Eitner. In 1904 the composer Vincent d'Indy produced an edition in French, which comprised only act 2, a shortened act 3 and act 4. This edition was the basis of the first public performance of the work in two-and-a-half centuries, a concert performance at d'Indy's Schola Cantorum on 25 February 1904. (Note: There may also have been a concert performance of an excerpt at the Paris Conservatoire in 1832.) The distinguished writer Romain Rolland, who was present, commended d'Indy for bringing the opera to life and returning it "to the beauty it once had, freeing it from the clumsy restorations which have disfigured it"—presumably a reference to Eitner's edition. The d'Indy edition was also the basis of the first modern staged performance of the work, at the Théâtre Réjane, Paris, on 2 May 1911.

An edition of the score by the minor Italian composer Giacomo Orefice (Milan, 1909) received several concert performances in Italy and elsewhere before and after the First World War. This edition was the basis of the opera's United States debut, another concert performance at the New York Met in April 1912. The opera was introduced to London, in d'Indy's edition, when it was sung to piano accompaniment at the Institut Français on 8 March 1924. The first British staged performance, with only small cuts, was given by the Oxford University Operatic Society on 7 December 1925, using an edition prepared for the event by Jack Westrup. In the London Saturday Review, music critic Dyneley Hussey called the occasion "one of the most important events of recent years"; the production had "indicated at once Monteverdi's claim to rank among the great geniuses who have written dramatic music". Westrup's edition was revived in London at the Scala Theatre in December 1929, the same year in which the opera received its first US staged performance, at Smith College, Northampton, Massachusetts. The three Scala performances resulted in a financial disaster, and the opera was not seen again in Britain for 35 years.

Among a flurry of revivals after 1945 was Paul Hindemith's edition, a full period reconstruction of the work prepared in 1943, which was staged and recorded at the Vienna Festival in 1954. This performance had a great impact on the young Nikolaus Harnoncourt, and was hailed as a masterpiece of scholarship and integrity. The first staged New York performance, by the New York City Opera under Leopold Stokowski on 29 September 1960, saw the American operatic debut of Gérard Souzay, one of several baritones who have sung the role of Orfeo. The theatre was criticised by New York Times critic Harold C. Schonberg because, to accommodate a performance of Luigi Dallapiccola's contemporary opera Il prigioniero, about a third of L'Orfeo was cut. Schonberg wrote: "Even the biggest aria in the opera, 'Possente spirito', has a good-sized slash in the middle ... [L'Orfeo] is long enough, and important enough, not to mention beautiful enough, to have been the entire evening's opera."

By the latter part of the 20th century the opera was being shown all over the world. In 1965, Sadler's Wells, forerunner of English National Opera (ENO), staged the first of many ENO presentations which would continue into the 21st century. Among various celebrations marking the opera's 400th anniversary in 2007 were a semi-staged performance at the Teatro Bibiena in Mantua, a full-scale production by the English Bach Festival (EBF) at the Whitehall Banqueting House in London on 7 February, and an unconventional production by Glimmerglass Opera in Cooperstown, New York, conducted by Antony Walker and directed by Christopher Alden. On 6 May 2010 the BBC broadcast a performance of the opera from La Scala, Milan. Despite the reluctance of some major opera houses to stage L'Orfeo, (Note: For example, as of 2010 the opera remains unstaged at New York Met and the Royal Opera House.) it is a popular work with the leading Baroque ensembles. From 2008 to 2010, the French-based Les Arts Florissants, under its director William Christie, presented the Monteverdi trilogy of operas (L'Orfeo, Il ritorno d'Ulisse and L'incoronazione di Poppea) in a series of performances at the Teatro Real in Madrid.

== Music ==
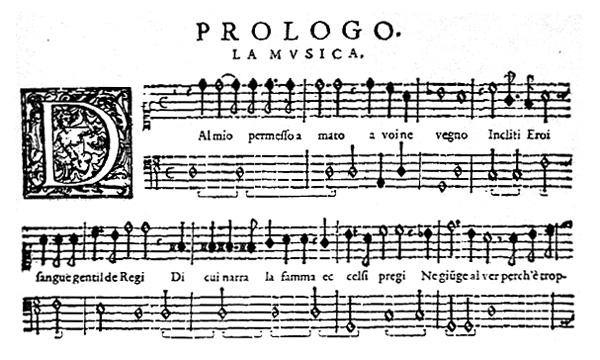
A page from the 1609 score of L'Orfeo

L'Orfeo is, in Redlich's analysis, the product of two musical epochs. It combines elements of the traditional madrigal style of the 16th century with those of the emerging Florentine mode, in particular the use of recitative and monodic singing as developed by the Camerata and their successors. In this new style, the text dominates the music; while sinfonias and instrumental ritornelli illustrate the action, the audience's attention is always drawn primarily to the words. The singers are required to do more than produce pleasant vocal sounds; they must represent their characters in depth and convey appropriate emotions.

Monterverdi's recitative style was influenced by Peri's, in Euridice, although in L'Orfeo recitative is less preponderant than was usual in dramatic music at this time. It accounts for less than a quarter of the first act's music, around a third of the second and third acts, and a little under half in the final two acts.

The importance of L'Orfeo is not that it was the first work of its kind, but that it was the first attempt to apply the full resources of the art of music, as then evolved, to the nascent genre of opera. In particular, Monteverdi made daring innovations in the use of polyphony, of which Palestrina had been the principal exponent. In L'Orfeo, Monteverdi extends the rules, beyond the conventions which polyphonic composers, faithful to Palestrina, had previously considered as sacrosanct. Monteverdi was not in the generally understood sense an orchestrator; Ringer finds that it is the element of instrumental improvisation that makes each performance of a Monteverdi opera a "unique experience, and separates his work from the later operatic canon".

"Toccata" from L'Orfeo
Live recording

The opera begins with a martial-sounding toccata for trumpets which is repeated twice. When played on period wind instruments the sound can be startling to modern audiences; Redlich calls it "shattering". Such flourishes were the standard signal for the commencement of performances at the Mantuan court; the opening chorus of Monteverdi's 1610 Vespers, also composed for Gonzaga's court, employs the same fanfare. The toccata acted as a salute to the Duke; according to Donington, if it had not been written, precedent would have required it to be improvised. As the brass sound of the toccata fades, it is replaced by the gentler tone of the strings ritornello which introduces La musica's prologue. The ritornello is repeated in shortened form between each of the prologue's five verses, and in full after the final verse. Its function within the opera as a whole is to represent the "power of music"; as such it is heard at the end of act 2, and again at the beginning of act 5, one of the earliest examples of an operatic leitmotiv. It is temporally structured as a palindrome and its form of strophic variations allows Monteverdi to carefully shape musical time for expressive and structural purposes in the context of seconda prattica.

After the prologue, act 1 follows in the form of a pastoral idyll. Two choruses, one solemn and one jovial are repeated in reverse order around the central love-song "Rosa del ciel" ("Rose of the heavens"), followed by the shepherds' songs of praise. The buoyant mood continues into act 2, with song and dance music influenced, according to Harnoncourt, by Monteverdi's experience of French music. The sudden entrance of La messaggera with the doleful news of Euridice's death, and the confusion and grief which follow, are musically reflected by harsh dissonances and the juxtaposition of keys. The music remains in this vein until the act ends with La musica's ritornello, a hint that the "power of music" may yet bring about a triumph over death. Monteverdi's instructions as the act concludes are that the violins, the organ and harpsichord become silent and that the music is taken up by the trombones, the cornetts and the regal, as the scene changes to the Underworld.

The centrepiece of act 3, perhaps of the entire opera, is Orfeo's extended aria "Possente spirto e formidabil nume" ("Mighty spirit and powerful divinity"), by which he attempts to persuade Caronte to allow him to enter Hades. Monteverdi's vocal embellishments and virtuoso accompaniment provide what Carter describes as "one of the most compelling visual and aural representations" in early opera. Instrumental colour is provided by a chitarrone, a pipe-organ, two violins, two cornetts and a double-harp. This array, according to music historian and analyst John Whenham, is intended to suggest that Orfeo is harnessing all the available forces of music to support his plea. In act 4 the impersonal coldness of the Underworld is broken by the warmth of Proserpina's singing on behalf of Orfeo, a warmth that is retained until the dramatic moment at which Orfeo "looks back". The cold sounds of the sinfonia from the beginning of act 3 then remind us that the Underworld is, after all, entirely devoid of human feeling. The brief final act, which sees Orfeo's rescue and metamorphosis, is framed by the final appearance of La musica's ritornello and the lively moresca that ends the opera. This dance, says Ringer, recalls the jigs danced at the end of Shakespeare's tragedies, and provides a means of bringing the audience back to their everyday world, "just as the toccata had led them into another realm some two hours before. The toccata and the moresca unite courtly reality with operatic illusion."

== Recording history ==
The first recording of L'Orfeo was issued in 1939, a freely adapted version of Monteverdi's music by Giacomo Benvenuti, given by the orchestra of La Scala Milan conducted by Ferrucio Calusio. In 1949, for the recording of the complete opera by the Berlin Radio Orchestra conducted by Helmut Koch, the new medium of long-playing records (LPs) was used. The advent of LP recordings was, as Harold C. Schonberg later wrote, an important factor in the postwar revival of interest in Renaissance and Baroque music, and from the mid-1950s recordings of L'Orfeo have been issued on many labels. The 1969 recording by Nikolaus Harnoncourt and the Vienna Concentus Musicus, using Harnoncourt's edition based on period instruments, was praised for "making Monteverdi's music sound something like the way he imagined". In 1981 Siegfried Heinrich, with the Early Music Studio of the Hesse Chamber Orchestra, recorded a version which re-created the original Striggio libretto ending, adding music from Monteverdi's 1616 ballet Tirsi e Clori for the Bacchante scenes. A few dozen commercial audio recordings have been released since 1939.

The first video recording was released in 1978, with Nikolaus Harnoncourt (conductor) and Jean-Pierre Ponnelle (director). Since then nine video recordings have been commercially released. See L'Orfeo discography.

== Editions ==
After the publication of the L'Orfeo score in 1609, the same publisher (Ricciardo Amadino of Venice) brought it out again in 1615. Facsimiles of these editions were printed in 1927 and 1972 respectively. Since Eitner's first "modern" edition of L'Orfeo in 1884, and d'Indy's performing edition 20 years later—both of which were abridged and adapted versions of the 1609 score—there have been many attempts to edit and present the work, not all of them published. Most of the editions that followed d'Indy up to the time of the Second World War were arrangements, usually heavily truncated, that provided a basis for performances in the modern opera idiom. Many of these were the work of composers, including Carl Orff (1923 and 1939) and Ottorino Respighi in 1935. Orff's 1923 score, using a German text, included some period instrumentation, an experiment he abandoned when producing his later version.

In the post-war period, editions have moved increasingly to reflect the performance conventions of Monteverdi's day. This tendency was initiated by two earlier editions, that of Jack Westrup used in the 1925 Oxford performances, and Gian Francesco Malipiero's 1930 complete edition which sticks closely to Monteverdi's 1609 original. After the war, Hindemith's attempted period reconstruction of the work was followed in 1955 by an edition from August Wenzinger that remained in use for many years. The next 30 years saw numerous editions, mostly prepared by scholar-performers rather than by composers, generally aiming towards authenticity if not always the complete re-creation of the original instrumentation. These included versions by Raymond Leppard (1965), Denis Stevens (1967), Nikolaus Harnoncourt (1969), Jane Glover (1975), Roger Norrington (1976) and John Eliot Gardiner. Only the composers Valentino Bucchi (1967), Bruno Maderna (1967) and Luciano Berio (1984) produced editions based on the convention of a large modern orchestra. In the 21st century editions continue to be produced, often for use in conjunction with a particular performance or recording.

== Notes and references ==
=== Sources ===
- Beat, Janet E. (1968). ""Monteverdi and the Opera Orchestra of his Time"". In Arnold, Denis; Fortune, Nigel (eds.). The Monteverdi Companion. London: Faber and Faber.
- Carter, Tim (2002). Monteverdi's Musical Theatre. New Haven, Connecticut: Yale University Press. ISBN 0-300-09676-3.
- Donington, Robert (1968). "Monteverdi's First Opera" in Arnold, Denis and Fortune, Nigel (eds): The Monteverdi Companion. London: Faber and Faber.
- Fenlon, Ian (1986a). "The Mantuan Orfeo" in Whenham, John (ed.): Claudio Monteverdi: Orfeo. Cambridge, England: Cambridge University Press. ISBN 0-521-24148-0.
- Fenlon, Ian (1986b). "Correspondence relating to the early Mantuan performances" in Whenham, John (ed.): Claudio Monteverdi: Orfeo. Cambridge, England: Cambridge University Press. ISBN 0-521-24148-0.
- Fortune, Nigel (1986). ""The rediscovery of Orfeo"". In Whenham, John (ed.). Claudio Monteverdi: Orfeo. Cambridge, England: Cambridge University Press. ISBN 0-521-24148-0.
- Fortune, Nigel; Whenham, John (1986). ""Modern editions and performances"". In Whenham, John (ed.). Claudio Monteverdi: Orfeo. Cambridge, England: Cambridge University Press. ISBN 0-521-24148-0.
- Glover, Jane (1986). "Solving the musical problem" in Whenham, John (ed.): Claudio Monteverdi: Orfeo. Cambridge, England: Cambridge University Press. ISBN 0-521-24148-0.
- Grout, Donald Jay (1971). A Short History of Opera. New York: Columbia University Press. ISBN 0-231-08978-3.
- Harnoncourt, Nikolaus (1969). "Claudio Monteverdi's L'Orfeo: An Introduction" (in notes accompanying TELDEC recording 8.35020 ZA). Hamburg: Teldec Schallplatten GmbH.
- Palisca, Claude V. (1981). Baroque Music. Englewood Cliffs, New Jersey: Prentice-Hall. ISBN 0-13-055947-4.
- Pirrotta, Nino (1984). Music and Culture in Italy from the Middle Ages to the Baroque. Cambridge, Massachusetts: Harvard University Press. ISBN 0-674-59108-9.
- Redlich, Hans (1952). Claudio Monteverdi: Life and Works. London: Oxford University Press.
- Ringer, Mark (2006). Opera's First Master: The Musical Dramas of Claudio Monteverdi. Newark, New Jersey: Amadeus Press. ISBN 1-57467-110-3.
- Robinson, Michael F. (1972). Opera before Mozart. London: Hutchinson & Co. ISBN 0-09-080421-X.
- Rolland, Romain (1986). "A review of Vincent d'Indy's performance (Paris 1904)" in Whenham, John (ed.): Claudio Monteverdi: Orfeo. Perkins, Wendy (tr.). Cambridge, England: Cambridge University Press. ISBN 0-521-24148-0.
- Sternfeld, F. W. (1986). "The Orpheus myth and the libretto of Orfeo". In Whenham, John (ed.). Claudio Monteverdi: Orfeo. Cambridge, England: Cambridge University Press. ISBN 0-521-24148-0.
- Whenham, John (1986). "Five acts, one action" in Claudio Monteverdi: Orfeo. London: Cambridge University Press. ISBN 0-521-24148-0.
