= Giovanni Gualberto Magli =

17th-century Italian castrato opera singer

Giovanni Gualberto Magli was an Italian castrato who had an active singing career during the first quarter of the 17th century. Born in Florence, he studied voice with Giulio Caccini before becoming a musician for the House of Medici on 23 August 1604. He participated in the world premiere of Claudio Monteverdi's L'Orfeo in 1607 at the court of Prince Francesco IV Gonzaga, Duke of Mantua, portraying the roles of La Musica and Proserpina and possibly one other part. The musicologist and historian Hans Redlich mistakenly allocates Magli to the role of Orfeo. In 1608 Magli sang for the wedding festivities of Cosimo II de' Medici, Grand Duke of Tuscany and Archduchess Maria Maddalena of Austria. In October 1611 he was granted two years paid leave by Antonio de' Medici to pursue further studies in Naples. He left Medici service in 1615 to join the musicians at the court of John Sigismund, Elector of Brandenburg. He remained there until September 1622. He was buried in Florence on 8 January 1625.

== Sources ==
- Fenlon, Ian (1986). "The Mantuan Orfeo". In Whenham, John (ed.). Claudio Monteverdi: Orfeo. London: Cambridge University Press. ISBN 9780521241489.
- Redlich, Hans (1952). Claudio Monteverdi: Life and Works. London: Oxford University Press.
