= Bacchini (surname) =

Bacchini and Bachini are Italian surnames. People with the names include:

- Benedetto Bacchini (1651–1721), Italian monk and man of letters
- Girolamo Bacchini (fl. 1580s–1590s), Italian castrato, composer, writer on music, and Roman Catholic priest
- John Bachini (fl. 1970s–2000s), English musician and television producer
- Jonathan Bachini (born 1975), Italian footballer
- Matteo Bachini (born 1995), Italian footballer
- Paolo Bacchini (born 1985), Italian figure skater
- Romolo Bacchini (1872–1938), Italian filmmaker, musician, painter and poet

== See also ==
- Bacchini, a tribe of hoverflies.
- Bachini, a village in India
