= Mullich =

Mullich is a surname. Notable people with the surname include:

- David Mullich (born 1957/1958), American game producer and designer
- Jon Mullich (born 1961), American actor, playwright, director, and Academy Award historian
