= Paolo Fabbri =

Paolo Fabbri may refer to:

- Paolo Fabbri (musicologist) (born 1948), Italian musicologist
- Paolo Fabbri (semiotician) (1939–2020), Italian semiotician
- Paolo Fabbri, character in L'isola di Montecristo played by Claudio Gora

== See also ==
- Via Paolo Fabbri 43, a 1976 album by Francesco Guccini
