= Girolamo Bacchini =

Italian opera singer

Giovanni Maria Bacchini (also known as Teodoro del Carmine and "Bacchino") was an Italian castrato, composer, writer on music, and Roman Catholic priest who flourished during the late 16th century and early 17th century.

== Life and career ==
Bacchini was a Carmelite friar who was highly active in church circles in Mantua from the late 1580s into the early part of the 17th century. During the 1580s he composed numerous masses for the Palatine church of Santa Barbara at the Ducal palace, Mantua which had been built by the then-reigning Duke of Mantua, Guglielmo Gonzaga. After Guglielmo's death in 1587, he continued to serve as a musician for the Mantuan Court and was active in Mantuan church circles up into the first few years of the 17th century.

In 1589 a book consisting of several of Bacchini's masses for 5 or 6 voices was published in Mantua. He was also the author of a treatise on music which is now lost. He became a frequent performer in entertainments for the court of Vincenzo Gonzaga, Duke of Mantua in the 1590s. In 1594 he traveled with the Duke to Regensburg where he performed for Philipp of Bavaria, the Bishop of Regensburg. In 1595 he accompanied the Duke on his first campaign against the Ottoman Empire in the southern Pannonian Plain; a trip which also included the company of composer Claudio Monteverdi and poet Giambattista Marino.

It is speculated that Bacchini sang the role of Euridice in the world premiere of Moneteverdi's L'Orfeo at the court of Prince Francesco Gonzaga of Mantua in 1607. This is based on a 1608 letter to Vincenzo Gonzaga, Duke of Mantua which refers to "that little priest who performed the role of Euridice in the Most Serene Prince's Orfeo". However, musicologist Tim Carter points out that by 1607 Bacchini had already left the service of the Mantuan Court and, while he may possibly have returned as a guest artist, it is plausible that another unknown individual portrayed the part.

== Sources ==
- Fenlon, Ian (1986). Whenham, John (ed.). "The Mantuan Orfeo" in Claudio Monteverdi: Orfeo. London: Cambridge University Press. ISBN 978-0-521-28477-6.
- Sternfeld, F.W. (1986). Whenham, John (ed.). "The Orpheus myth and the libretto of Orfeo" in Claudio Monteverdi: Orfeo. London: Cambridge University Press. ISBN 978-0-521-28477-6.
