= Giacomo Benvenuti (composer) =

Italian composer and musicologist (1885–1943)

Giacomo Benvenuti (16 March 1885, Toscolano – 20 January 1943, Barbarano-Salò) was an Italian composer and musicologist.

== Life and career ==
He was the son of organist Cristoforo Benvenuti and studied at the Liceo Musicale (now the Conservatorio Giovanni Battista Martini) in Bologna under Luigi Torchi (musicology) and Marco Enrico Bossi (organ). In 1919 his collection of songs for voice and piano accompaniment, Canti a una voce : con accompagnamento di pianoforte, was published in Bologna. In 1922 he published a collection of 17th-century art songs entitled 35 Arie di vari autori del secolo XVII. Composer Samuel Barber studied the works of Giulio Caccini, Andrea Falconieri, and other early Italian composers under his tutelage in Milan in 1933–1934. For the Teatro dell'Opera di Roma he adapted Claudio Monteverdi's L'Orfeo for a production which premiered on 27 December 1934. The adaptation was later used for the first recording of L'Orfeo in 1939, which included a performance by the orchestra of La Scala Milan under conductor Ferrucio Calusio.
