= Possente spirto =

"Possente spirto, e formidabil nume" ("Mighty spirit and formidable god") is a key aria from Act 3 of Claudio Monteverdi's opera L'Orfeo, where Orpheus attempts to persuade Charon to allow him to pass into Hades and find Euridice.

At the start of the Act, Hope (Speranza, sop.) has guided Orpheus to the banks of the Styx, where, at the sign 'Abandon all hope, ye who enter', she can go no further.

Orpheus' way is barred by Charon, who explains that no living body shall enter his boat. Orpheus (tenor) sings that he is no longer living, for, with his wife dead, he himself no longer has a heart (senza cor). Charon (bass-baritone) is initially unmoved, but when Orpheus continues singing, and then plays his lyre, Charon is lulled to sleep.

Orpheus crosses over the Styx in Charon's boat, singing Rendetemi il mio ben, tartarei Numi! (Give me back my love, O gods of Tartarus!). The Chorus of Spirits then sing Nulla impresa per uom si tenta invano, (No enterprise of man is undertaken in vain...) to close the third act.

This aria is one of the most important musical documents of early Italian Baroque performance practice. In the original published edition (1607), Monteverdi uniquely includes two separate versions for Orfeo to sing, one simple and one elaborately ornamented. This style of embellishing the otherwise simply notated musical line was presumably expected for much of the music of this time period.
