= Ferrucio Calusio =

Ferrucio Calusio (1889 or 1890 – 3 June 1983) was an Argentine conductor. He began his career in the 1920s at La Scala in Milan, Italy as an assistant conductor to Arturo Toscanini. In 1927 he returned to his native country to join the conducting staff of the Teatro Colón in Buenos Aires. He served as one of that house's main conductors in the Italian repertoire through 1960. He also worked as a guest conductor with several important opera houses during his career, including conducting several operas at La Scala in the 1930s and at the Metropolitan Opera (Cavalleria rusticana, Pagliacci, and Il trovatore) in 1940–1941. In 1939 he conducted the orchestra of La Scala for the first recording of Claudio Monteverdi's L'Orfeo. He died in Buenos Aires at the age of 93.
