= Paolo Fabbri (musicologist) =

Italian musicologist and academic

Paolo Fabbri, born 15 October 1948, is an Italian musicologist and academic. In 1989 he was awarded the Dent Medal. He is best known for his extensive publications on the life and works of Gioachino Rossini, and for a biography of composer Claudio Monteverdi which was first published in the Italian language in Turin in 1985 and later published by Cambridge University Press using an English language translation by Tim Carter in 1994. He is also the author of Il secolo cantante: Per una storia del libretto d'opera nel Seicento (Bologna, 1990). For many years he has been a professor of Music History and Musical Aesthetics at the University of Ferrara. He is the current director of the Fondazione Donizetti library in Bergamo.
