= Jon Mullich =

American actor and playwright (born 1961)

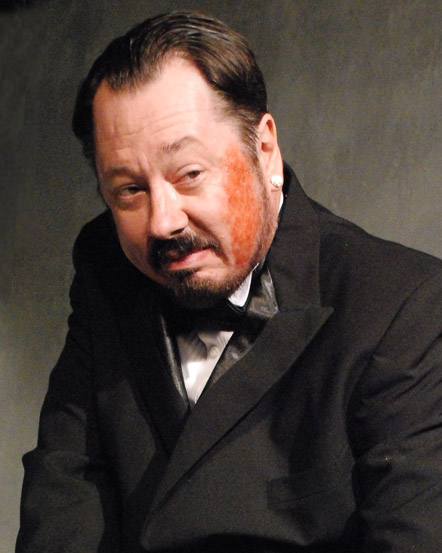
- Jon Mullich as Richard III
- Born: 1961 (age 64–65); Los Angeles, California, U.S.
- Education: California State University, Northridge
- Occupations: Actor, playwright, historian, director
- Website: madbeast.com

Jon Mullich (born 1961) is an American actor, playwright, director and Academy Award historian.

== Early life ==
Mullich was born in Los Angeles, California.

== Career ==
Mullich played Gloucester in Reza Abdoh's vision of King Lear and Abel Drugger in The Alchemist at the Globe Playhouse among other roles before achieving recognition for his performance in the title role of Mark Ringer's production of Hamlet. It was praised for its "touches of gallows humor and mocking fatalism", the first theatrical production produced under the Actors' Equity Association 99-seat theater plan.

The LA Weekly described Mullich's Angelo in Measure for Measure: "this staging of Shakespeare's tragicomic treatise of sexual politics shines on the merits of the marvelously austere, yet emotionally vulnerable, Jon Mullich". He also played Lord Grizzle in Dennis Gersten's production of The Author's Thumb (adapted from the works of Henry Fielding), Thomas Diaforus in The Imaginary Invalid, Demetrius in A Midsummer Night's Dream and Malvolio in Twelfth Night, as well as appearances on the television show Totally Hidden Video.

When he took on the title role in Shakespeare's Richard III in 2015, one critic wrote "Jon Mullich is one of the best 'Richards' we have seen, teetering a tight line between portraying madness, histrionics and unbridled ambition. It takes a studied actor to show the human side of Richard without giving in to the buffoonery of his folly and Mullich owns the character both body and soul."

Mullich's work as a playwright includes an adaptation of Carlo Goldoni's farce A Servant of Two Masters which transferred the action of the play to Prohibition-era Chicago. Mullich also played the role of Truffaldino Bottachio as a Brooklyn wise guy in the premiere production, a performance that Back Stage West said "keeps the audience roaring with laughter at his shameless mugging".

He also wrote The Special Award, a drama about D.W. Griffith which examines events surrounding the director's lifetime achievement Oscar at the 1936 Academy Award ceremony and the Academy of Motion Picture Arts and Sciences' controversial early role as a labor organization in Hollywood.

He writes a weekly humor blog titled "Jonny's Enemies List".

== U.S.S. Pinafore ==
Mullich directed and adapted U.S.S. Pinafore from H.M.S. Pinafore by Gilbert & Sullivan. It took the original operetta's depiction of social climbing on a Victorian sailing vessel and transferred it to an absurdist take on the universe of Star Trek. It included such non-G&S elements as a talking computer, a lizard man, and an alien probe, and also featured Gilbert & Sullivan songs from The Mikado and The Yeomen of the Guard.

Kerry O'Quinn, founder of Starlog and Fangoria magazines, wrote "It's rare that such a bold and original concept is so professionally executed." The Huffington Post added "I don't want to spoil any jokes or gags because they are so lovely and lively and fresh. Suffice to say you don't need to be a fan of both or either genres -- just someone who likes to laugh -- in order enjoy this silly, sexy romp." It was nominated for a 2011 Saturn Award for Best Small Theatre Production by the Academy of Science Fiction, Fantasy & Horror Films.

== See also ==
- List of American actors
- List of American playwrights
