= Mark Ringer =

American actor

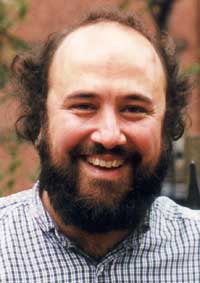
Mark Ringer

Mark Ringer (born December 8, 1959) is an American writer, theater and opera historian, director and actor. Ringer’s books include Electra and the Empty Urn: Metatheater and Role Playing in Sophocles, a critical analysis of theatrical self-awareness in the seven Sophoclean tragedies, Opera's First Master: The Musical Dramas of Claudio Monteverdi, which Alan Rich of the LA Weekly described as "an uncommonly well-told accounting of Monteverdi's operatic legacy",, Franz Schubert's Theatre of Song, and Bach's Operas of the Soul: A Listener's Guide to the Sacred Cantatas. Ringer's work as a director has concentrated on classical plays such as The Alchemist and The Puritan for R. Thad Taylor's Globe Playhouse and Hamlet with Jon Mullich in the title role. Ringer is married to director Barbara Bosch, for whom he played Falstaff in his own adaptation of the two parts of William Shakespeare's Henry IV as well as Polonius and the Gravedigger in The Heart of My Mystery: The Hamlet Project. His performances for other directors include Malvolio in Twelfth Night, Zeus in Iliad, Nick Bottom in A Midsummer Night's Dream, and Baptista in Taming of the Shrew. Ringer is a Professor of Theatre Arts and holds the title of Distinguished Chair at Marymount Manhattan College.

== Works ==
- Opera's First Master ISBN 1-57467-110-3
- Electra and the Empty Urn ISBN 0-8078-4697-X
- Franz Schubert's Theatre of Song ISBN 1-57467-176-6
- Euripides and the Boundaries of the Human ISBN 978-1498518437
- Bach's Operas of the Soul: A Listener's Guide to the Sacred Cantatas ISBN 978-1538135563
- Aeschylus, Character, and the Yoke of Necessity ISBN 978-1666939088
