= Hans Redlich =

Austrian composer

Hans Ferdinand Redlich (11 February 1903 – 27 November 1968) was an Austrian musicologist, writer, conductor and composer who, due to political disruption by the Nazi Party, lived and worked in Britain from 1939 until his death nearly thirty years later.

== Redlich's continental years ==
Redlich was born in Vienna, the son of Josef Redlich (1869-1936), then Professor of History at the University of Vienna. He studied piano privately with Paul Weingarten and harmony and counterpoint with Hugo Kauder. He was a student of Carl Orff in Munich after 1921. He was a university student in both cities and studied German literature and musicology. Redlich served as répétiteur for the Berlin-Charlottenburg city opera in 1924–1925 and as opera conductor for the Stadttheater Mainz from 1925 to 1929.

From 1929 until 1931, Redlich studied musicology at Frankfurt University where he completed a dissertation on stylistic changes in Claudio Monteverdi's madrigals. From then until 1937, Redlich resided in Mannheim as a composer and writer. His interest in Monteverdi led to his preparation of a performing edition of the 1610 Vespers, based on Gian Francesco Malipiero's pioneering collected edition of Monteverdi's works, published in 1932. Redlich's edition of the Vespers was used for the first full modern performance revival at Zurich in February 1935, and for subsequent performances in New York (1937), Switzerland (mid-1940s), Brussels (1946) and London (on 14 May 1946 at Westminster Central Hall).

Due to the political situation he was forced to move back to Vienna in 1937 and, two years later, emigrated to Britain, taking up British nationality in 1947.

== Life in Britain ==
The 30 years Redlich spent in Britain were perhaps the most fruitful of all. He was involved in the Morley College concerts during and after the war. On 21 May 1948 the first London performance of Monteverdi's L'incoronazione di Poppea, was given by the Morley College choir and orchestra in a concert performance, using an edition prepared by Redlich, who played harpsichord accompaniment, directed by Michael Tippett.

He lived for many years in Letchworth, and in 1941 founded the Letchworth Choral and Orchestral Society, which he led until 1955; at the same time he gave lectures for the Workers' Educational Association from 1941 to 1943 as well as for the Extra Mural Departments of the Universities of Cambridge and Birmingham from 1942 to 1955. One of his pupils while at Letchworth was the Greek composer Jani Christou.

His first full-time position since arriving in the UK some 15 years earlier came with his appointment as lecturer in music history at Edinburgh University in 1955, and in 1962 he became a professor of music at the University of Manchester (succeeding Humphrey Procter-Gregg), which awarded him an honorary Doctor of Music degree in 1967.

Redlich contributed a volume to Eric Blom's Master Musicians Series in 1955: Bruckner and Mahler was a ground-breaking work in English. In the introduction he tells us he met Gustav Mahler as a child and his father was a friend of Mahler. Later he knew members of Mahler's family and published, from 1919 onwards, several studies in German of Mahler and his music. His book on Alban Berg, published in 1957, was the first to appear in English, and contains lengthy chapters analysing Wozzeck and Lulu. In 1966 Redlich was a founding member and the first vice-president of the International Alban Berg Society of New York.

He was a major contributor to the New Oxford History of Music and the fifth edition of the Grove Dictionary of Music and Musicians, as well as English editor to Die Musik in Geschichte und Gegenwart, for which he wrote many of the entries on English composers. In 1953 he was a member of the editorial board for the Hallischen Händel-Ausgabe. He produced critical editions of Handel's Concerti Grossi, Op. 6, Water Music and Music for the Royal Fireworks (1962–1966), the first chance for English audiences to hear the works in their original scoring, rather than in the suites heavily orchestrated by Hamilton Harty. He also acted as the general editor of the Eulenburg miniature scores series.

Redlich married his first wife Elise Gerlach in 1930, and she came to the UK with him. She died in 1959 and he married again in 1961 to Erika Burger. Redlich died in Manchester, where he had been living at 1 Morville Road, after several heart attacks.

== Books by Hans Redlich ==
- Wagner opera series: Tristan and Isolde (1945); Lohengrin (1949); Parsifal (1951).
- Monteverdi: Life and Works, London: Oxford University Press, 1952 (a translation by Kathleen Dale of Monteverdi: Leben und Werk, 1949)
- Bruckner and Mahler, (Master Musicians Series), London: Dent, 1955 (revised 1963)
- Alban Berg, the Man and His Music by H.F. Redlich. London: John Calder, 1957
- New Oxford History of Music, Vol. IV ('The Age of Humanism'), 1968 (Chapter V/c and Chapter X)

== Archive ==
- The papers and scores of Hans Redlich are held at the University of Lancaster. His scores formed the foundation of the music collection; other items may be accessed through the Lancaster University Library.
- Royds, Graham. Catalogue of the Hans Ferdinand Redlich Collection of musical books and scores: (including material on the Second Viennese School). University of Lancaster Library (1976)
