= John Whenham =

English musicologist (died 2026)

John Whenham (July 1946 – 16 August 2026) was an English musicologist and academic who specialized in early Italian baroque music. He earned both a Bachelor of Music and a Master of Arts from the University of Nottingham, and a Doctor of Philosophy from the University of Oxford. He was a leading expert on the life and works of Claudio Monteverdi, and was the author of the books Duet and Dialogue in the Age of Monteverdi (Ann Arbor, Michigan: University Microfilms International, 1982) Monteverdi, 'Orfeo' (London: Cambridge University Press, 1986), Monteverdi, Vespers (1610) (Cambridge University Press, 1997), and The Cambridge Companion to Monteverdi (with Richard Wistreich, Cambridge University Press, 2007). For five years he was co-editor of the journal Music & Letters. He was head of the music department at the University of Birmingham from 2001 to 2011. Alongside his teaching and research, in the 1980s he founded Birmingham University Liturgical Choir (later the University Singers) and also, on his appointment as head of department, played a significant role in the planning, funding and construction of what was to become the Bramall Music Building.
