= Tim Carter (musicologist) =

Australian musicologist

- Born: 1954 (age 71–72); Sydney, Australia

Academic background
- Education: Durham University; University of Birmingham
- Thesis: Jacopo Peri (1561–1633): His Life and Works (1980)
- Doctoral advisor: Nigel Fortune

Academic work
- Discipline: Musicology
- Sub-discipline: Renaissance music Baroque music Opera; Musical theatre
- Institutions: University of Leicester; Lancaster University; Royal Holloway, University of London; University of North Carolina at Chapel Hill

Timothy Carter (born 1954) is an Australian musicologist specialising in late Renaissance and Baroque music, particularly Italian music and opera.

Carter is the David G. Frey Distinguished Professor Emeritus of Music at the University of North Carolina at Chapel Hill. His research has included studies of Claudio Monteverdi, Jacopo Peri, Mozart, Italian opera, and American musical theatre.

== Early life and education ==
Carter was born in Sydney, Australia, in 1954, and raised in England. He graduated from the University of Durham with a first-class degree in music in 1975 and then studied under Nigel Fortune at the University of Birmingham, where he completed his PhD in 1980.

== Career ==
Carter's early research focused principally on Italian music of the late Renaissance and early Baroque periods. He taught at the University of Leicester and Lancaster University before joining Royal Holloway, University of London, where he served as chair of the Department of Music. In 2001, he moved to the University of North Carolina at Chapel Hill as David G. Frey Distinguished Professor of Music and chair of the Department of Music. At North Carolina, he expanded his research interests to twentieth-century American musical theatre, including the works of Rodgers and Hammerstein.

Carter served as president of the Society for Seventeenth-Century Music from 2003 to 2006 and was joint editor of Music & Letters from 1992 to 1998.

In 2013, Carter received the H. Colin Slim Award and the Claude V. Palisca Award from the American Musicological Society, becoming the first scholar to receive both awards in the same year. The former recognised his article "Monteverdi, Early Opera and a Question of Genre: The Case of Andromeda (1620)", while the latter was awarded for his work on Kurt Weill's Johnny Johnson.

During 2015–16, Carter was a fellow at the National Humanities Center, where he worked on a project concerning political musical theatre in the United States during the 1930s.

== Selected publications ==
- Carter, Tim (1987). W. A. Mozart: Le nozze di Figaro. Cambridge Opera Handbooks. Cambridge: Cambridge University Press. ISBN 0-521-30267-6.
- ——— (1989). Jacopo Peri, 1561–1633: His Life and Works. Vol. 1–2. New York: Garland. ISBN 0-8240-2346-3.
- ——— (1992). Music in Late Renaissance & Early Baroque Italy. London: Batsford. ISBN 978-0-7134-6737-6.
- ——— (2002). Monteverdi's Musical Theatre. New Haven: Yale University Press. ISBN 978-0-300-09676-7.
- ——— (2007). Oklahoma!: The Making of an American Musical. New Haven: Yale University Press. ISBN 978-0-300-10619-0.
- ——— (2015). Understanding Italian Opera. New York: Oxford University Press. ISBN 978-0-19-024794-2.
- ——— (2017). Rodgers and Hammerstein's Carousel. Oxford Keynotes. New York: Oxford University Press. ISBN 978-0-19-069343-5.
- ——— (2024). Monteverdi's Voices: A Poetics of the Madrigal. New York: Oxford University Press. ISBN 978-0-19-775919-6.
- ——— (2025). Mozart: A Tale of Two Keys. New York: Oxford University Press. ISBN 978-0-19-780633-3.

=== As co-author ===
- with Goldthwaite, Richard A. (2013). Orpheus in the Marketplace: Jacopo Peri and the Economy of Late Renaissance Florence. Cambridge, Massachusetts: Harvard University Press. ISBN 978-0-674-72464-8.
- with Fantappiè, Francesca (2021). Staging Euridice: Theatre, Sets, and Music in Late Renaissance Florence. Cambridge: Cambridge University Press. ISBN 978-1-316-51540-2.
